= Origin of Wallace Fard Muhammad =

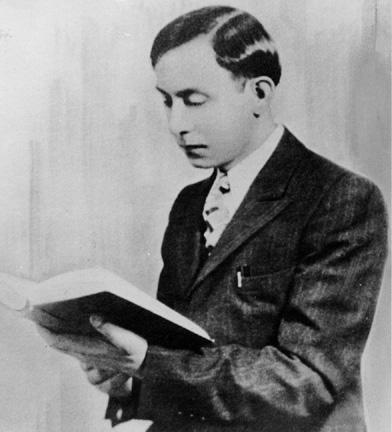
Official portrait of Wallace Fard Muhammad from the Nation of Islam

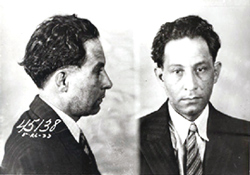
Fard's 1933 Detroit mugshot

Wallace Fard Muhammad, the founder of the new religious movement that came to be known as the Nation of Islam, first appeared in Detroit, United States, in 1930. Both his origin and fate are uncertain.

Nation of Islam tradition holds that Fard was born in Mecca, while scholars have considered a wide variety of possible origins and backgrounds. In the 1960s, the FBI identified Fard as "Wallie Dodd Ford", a Los Angeles restaurateur who had spent three years in prison in California for the sale of a narcotic; the Nation of Islam disputes the identification, while most scholars accept it.

Fard disappeared in 1934. Nation of Islam leader Elijah Muhammad maintained that Fard had been deported, while others speculated that Fard may have died by foul play or due to complications from his diabetes.

== Theories of origin ==
Fard was traditionally held by the Nation of Islam to be an Arab from Mecca. Many scholars argue that Fard may have been from South Asia (India, Pakistan, Afghanistan). Some claim he was a white man, perhaps from New Zealand. Others speculate he was a Turk. Less popular theories of origin suggest he may have been Syrian, Moroccan, Greek, Bosnian, Albanian, African-American, or Jewish.

=== South Asia ===
Karl Evanzz, in his book The Messenger, postulates that Fard was the son of a Muslim from modern-day Pakistan, then known as East India. He bases this theory on several indications:

1. Fard spent time at the Ahmadiyya Mosque, a movement prominent in Pakistan and used translations of the Quran from South Asian Muslims.
2. The name Fard is a common surname in Pakistan, as are other names that he bestowed upon his followers, such as Shabazz, Ghulam, and Kallatt.
3. Interviews with long-time Nation figures who met him or saw original photos of him, such as Ozier Muhammad, Rodnell Collins (nephew of Malcolm X) and Wilfred Little, indicate that Fard had Pakistani features.
4. Early teachings from Fard indicated a distrust and disdain for Hinduism.

The 2017 book Chameleon: The True Story of W.D. Fard by A. K. Arian studies the origin of the Nation of Islam founder. One theory postulated is that Fard was of Afghan heritage. The 2019 book Finding W.D. Fard: Unveiling the Identity of the Founder of the Nation of Islam investigates a variety of theories about Fard's ethnic and religious origins, writing: "The people who actually met him, and the scholars who have studied him, have suggested that he was variously an African American, an Arab from Syria, Lebanon, Algeria, Morocco or Saudi Arabia ... a Turk, an Afghan, an Indo-Pakistani ... a Greek ... In an attempt to determine the origins of W.D. Fard, most scholars have relied on his teachings as passed down, and perhaps modified, by Elijah Muhammad. Some have suggested that he was a member of the Moorish Science Temple of America or the Ahmadiyyah Movement. Others have suggested that he was a Druze or a Shiite." John Andrew Morrow suggests that a background of Ghulat or extremist Shia Islam best fits with what is known of Fard.

Morrow argues Fard most likely was connected to "the region of Afghanistan, Pakistan, and Balochistan".

== Fard before California ==
Efforts to trace the origins and life story of Fard have been extensive but have yielded only inconclusive fragmentary results, and not even his date of death is known; further complicating any efforts is the fact that only an inconclusive handful of pictures of Fard are known to exist, including four mugshots taken after various arrests and one being the official portrait by the Nation of Islam. Additionally, Fard is alleged to have used up to 58 different aliases during his life.

In the 1960s, authors Arna Bontemps and Jack Conroy speculated that Fard may have been an African-American from the U.S. South. (Note: For example, it has been suggested that Wallace Fard of Jasper, Texas, who is listed as "mulatto" in the 1910 census, might be connected to Wallace Fard Muhammad of 1930s Detroit.) Karl Evanzz of The Washington Post submitted a Freedom of Information Act request to the FBI in 1978 requesting its file on Fard. Evanzz based his account of Fard's life on the declassified portion of the FBI file that he received about a decade after his request. Evanzz detailed the experience of several other authors who also based their accounts of Fard's life on the FBI file.

Multiple scholars have suggested that Master Fard's teaching of the Tribe of Shabazz may have been tied to the Shrine of Lal Shahbaz Qalandar in Sehwan, Pakistan.

=== Immigration to the United States ===
Arian has asserted that W. D. Fard was the person known as Alam Khan or Khanialam Khan. A 1904 manifest stated that Johnges Khan, Rahim Ullah, Drabas Khan, Hamif Ulla, Khanialam Khan and Sher Khan, from British India, were traveling aboard the SS Tremont to join their brother in Tacoma. In 1907, a directory listed Jongie, Kaliaham, and Zendad Khan as tamale manufacturers who were living together at 36 McBroom Ave in Spokane. Jangger Khan died on August 6, 1910, in Butte, Montana, where he had been a tamale vendor. In 1911, Sher Khan of Portland applied for citizenship, reporting a birthplace in Balochistan. On February 23, 1917, press reported a court had denied Sher Khan's application for citizenship on the ground that his stated birthplace, Balochistan, was "not of the white race". Sher Khan's World War draft registration listed him as residing in Eugene, Oregon, working as a tamale maker. He listed his nearest relative as Fardes Khan of Balochistan, Afghanistan. In 1921, the marriage certificate of Joe Mobine Khan lists his birthplace as Afghanistan, his father as Madie Khan and his mother as Mary Gee. Fard was later a tamale vendor in Oregon.

However, in 2025, new research by Kevin Morris and Anton Batey shows that the immigrant Alam Khan or Khanialam Khan was not Fard, as he later took the name Khan Alley and died on November 19, 1958, in Lodi, California. Batey and Morris uncovered a manifest revealing that someone named Wallie Dad Khan, aged 18, travelled from Hong Kong to San Francisco in 1907 on the SS Coptic, and arrived on January 6 or 7, 1907. He was listed as an Indian, a Mohamedean, and from "Ghunzee". He was also planning to visit relatives named Gool Ahmed Khan and Najib Khan. Najib Khan, born around 1872, listed his father in 1912 as Akram Khan and birthplace as "Purzai Hazro Dist. Attock". On the same 1912 manifest was listed a Kadir Khan, who was planning to visit his relative or friend, "Wale Dad". In 1911 Kadir Khan also named his friend Wale Dad Khan. In 1909, a man named Sargand from "Sheenka, India" stated he was going to visit his friend Wali Dad at a tamale factory located on 61 Water Street in Portland, Oregon. Sargand lived with Roshin Din, who came to the United States to visit his relative, Fathe Din, the same man who Fard, under the name of Fred Dad, sued in 1910. In 1910 a man named Burdar Khan stated he was from Ghanzi, Afghanistan, his father was named Abdool Aziz, and that he would visit Wali Dad Khan at the tamale factory at 61 Water Street. Mohammed Alberkan, who was alongside Wallie Dad Khan in 1907, later stated he was planning to visit his brothers Najib and Gool Ahmed Khan.

=== Walihad, Salem tamale vendor ===
In September 1907, tamale man Walihad met Harvey H. Henline, who bought some tamales from Walihad, but refused to pay for them. When Walihad demanded the money, Henline allegedly struck him, leading to him being taken into custody for disorderly conduct. This charge was later dismissed.

=== Fred Walldad (Bilidad), Eugene tamale vendor ===
On March 11, 1908, Fred Bilidad, the hot tamale vendor, ordered a fine tamale wagon for around $150 (equivalent to $5,375 in 2025), which he expected to receive from Vancouver.

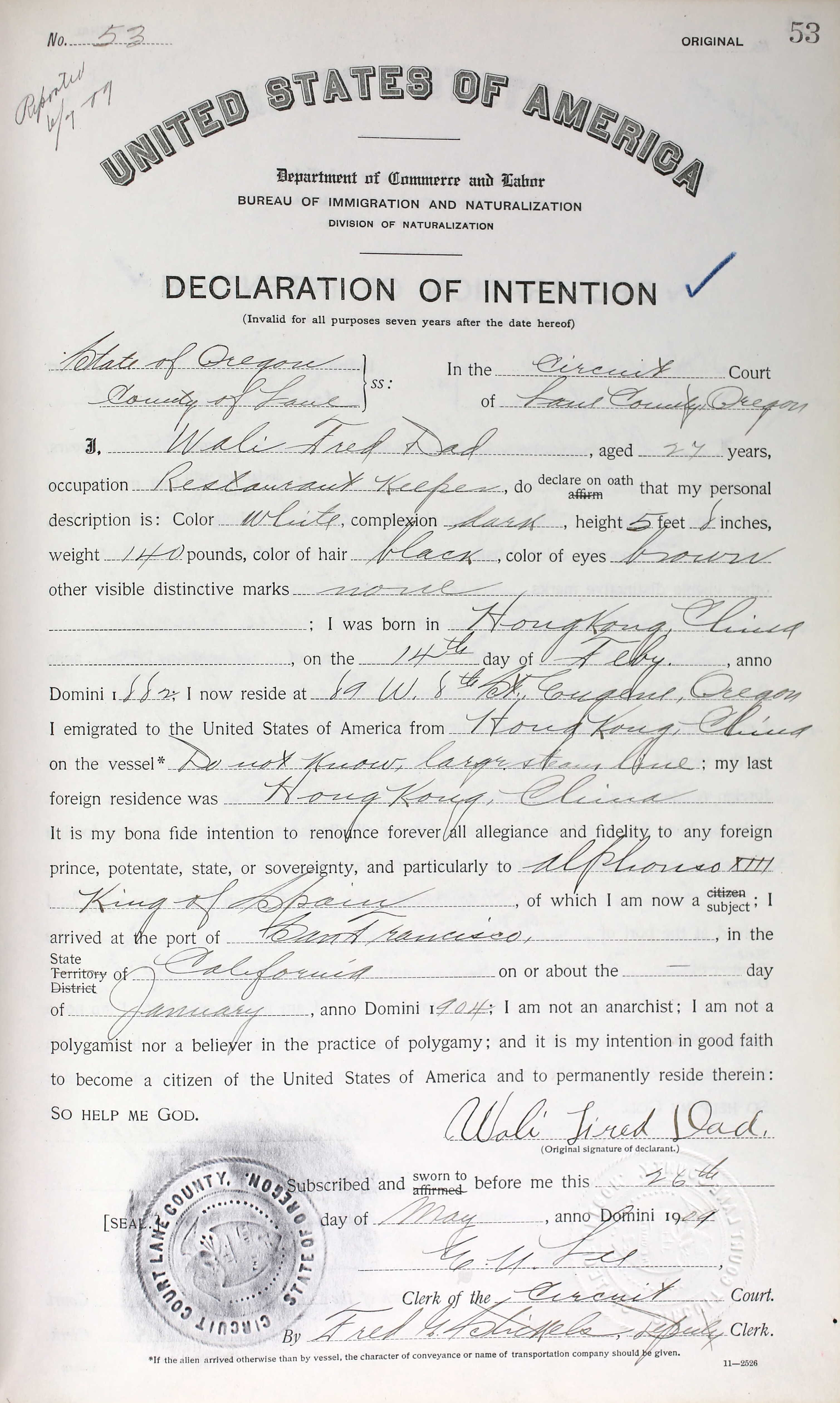
An immigration record dated May 26, 1909 for Wali Fred Dad, restaurateur operating in Eugene, Oregon.

On March 23, 1908, papers announced that Turkish tamale vendor Fred Walldad had received a small house on wheels. On September 8, 1908, Eugene newspapers announced a new lunchcart that would be opening adjacent to the cart owned by Fred the Turk. Four days later, press reported that Fred had been ordered to move his hot-tamale cart to a new location. By September 15, it was reported that Fred the Turk had to abandon his cart due to the order and was now operating out of the back of a cigar store. On September 18, "Fred the Greek", tamale vendor, was reported to have paid a license fee, and it was announced that his stand would resume operation at a new location.

In October, newspapers announced that Fred the Turk was traveling to Portland for a visit. On November 3, newspapers reported on a "Halloween prank" in which local boys took the wheels off Fred the Turk's tamale wagon and dropped it, breaking Fred's dishes and eggs, as well as injuring Fred himself; the wheel was stolen. On December 7, newspapers reported on Fred's petition to have his cart operating during the day as well as at night.

On February 3, 1909, newspapers reported that Fred the Turk had sold his lunchwagon and gone to Cottage Grove, Oregon, where he had leased a restaurant and lodging house.

On May 26, 1909, Wali Fred Dad, restaurateur of Eugene, applied for citizenship in the United States; he reported being a white man born in Hong Kong, China on February 14, 1882, who arrived in San Francisco in January 1904. In the document, he renounced allegiance to King Alphonso XIII of Spain. The next day, Eugene newspapers reported that Fred Mali Dad, a Spaniard, had filed citizenship papers.

In 1910, "Fred Conn", an Afghan, is listed in the US Census in Missoula, Montana, and a 1915 article noted that the tamale vendor "Walli Dad" lived in Billings, Montana, around 1910, indicating Dodd moved to Montana, for a short time.

=== Fred Dodd/Dadd, Salem tamale vendor ===
From the FBI's response to the Freedom of Information Act request, Evanzz claimed that Fard was Fred Dodd, an Oregonian tamale vendor. A 1911 directory lists Fred Dadd as a tamale vendor in Salem, Oregon.

A 1912 directory lists him as living with a person named "Ana".

On July 28, 1912, newspapers reported that a house occupied by lunchwagon operator Fred Dadd had caught fire.

On August 9, 1912, newspapers reported on Fred Dadd, local tamale vendor and naturalized American originally from New Zealand, attending his first baseball game. On April 8, 1913, the city council of Salem reported unfavorably on Dodd's request to sell fruit without acquiring an additional license. On April 29, Dodd penned an announcement in the newspaper, complaining about police harassment for fruit sales. In June, it was reported that Dodd's complaint of police harassment would be investigated by the police committee. After the committee reported and the report was adopted, the mayor instructed the chief of police to allow Dodd to sell his wares.

In September 1913, Dodd filed a criminal complaint alleging that Frank Day had embezzled funds from him; Day was fined $25 (equivalent to $814 in 2025) and given a suspended sentence.

On March 5, 1914, Dodd was arrested for allegedly inducing Laura E. Swanson to leave her spouse for him; he was released on bond for $1,000 (equivalent to $32,143 in 2025). A March 23 report cited Dodd's charge as "assaulting a married woman". On April 21, a jury acquitted Dodd. The Capital Journal explained the verdict by saying "It was brought out in the cross examination of the complaining witness that there was another person in the house at the time of the alleged assault and that she did not cry for help as a person in her circumstances would be aroused."

On April 20, 1914 (the day before his acquittal), Dodd married Pearl Allen in Multnomah County, Oregon. However, by August 30, newspapers reported on divorce proceedings between the two. On November 14, 1914, Fred Dodd was arrested for larceny after allegedly stealing from his wife Pearl, whom he was suing for divorce. Their divorce was announced on December 27. Pearl gave birth to a son the following year. A 2024 DNA test may suggest that this son was not biologically descended from Dodd.

On November 22, 1915, the Statesman Journal announced that Dodd planned a vacation to California and "all the big eastern cities", noting that it was his "first vacation in six years". The newspaper described him as "the genial Turkish lad" and mentioned that Fred Dodd "has a lot of friends around The Statesman office". His first stop was in San Francisco, with plans to travel to Los Angeles, San Diego, New Orleans, New York, and Chicago, among others. On December 19, 1915, it was reported that Fred Dodd's night lunchwagon had been purchased at an attachment sale to satisfy a judgment of $132.07 (equivalent to $4,203 in 2025) held against Fred by a resident of Billings, Montana.

== Wallie Dodd Ford, Los Angeles restaurateur ==
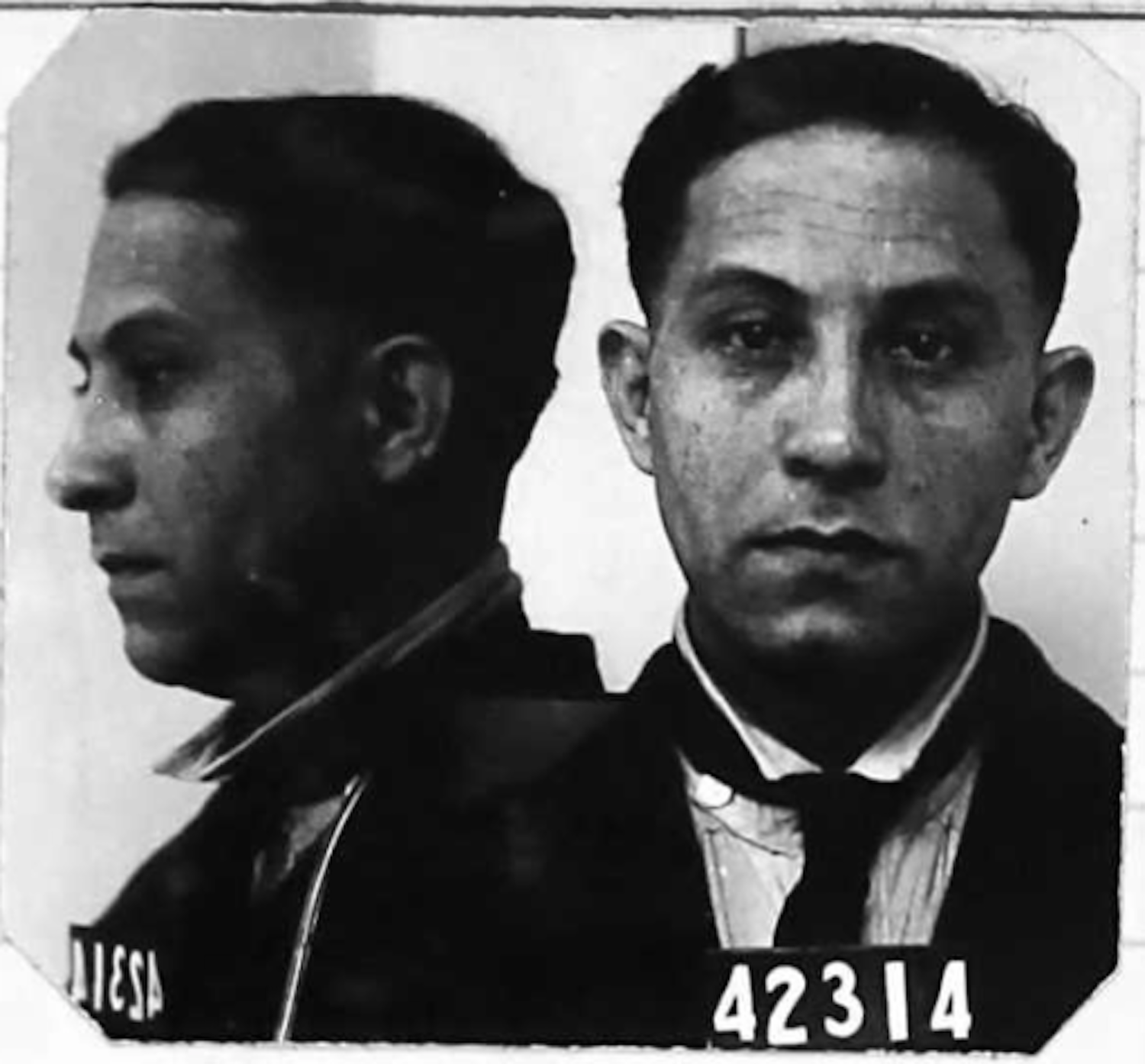
Wallie Dodd Ford mugshot in 1926

Dodd moved to Los Angeles, using the name Wallie Dodd Ford. A World War I draft registration card for Wallie Dodd Fard from 1917 indicated that he was living in Los Angeles, unmarried, as a restaurant owner, and reported that he was born in Shinka, Afghanistan, on February 26, 1893. He further reported that he was a resident alien and citizen of Afghanistan. He was described as being of medium height and build with brown eyes and black hair. On the draft card, "Ford" is written in parentheses in a different hand. At the bottom of the card, he signed his name as "Wallie Dodd Ford".

Ford was arrested by Los Angeles police on November 17, 1918, on a charge of assault with a deadly weapon.

As of 1920, Ford was still living in Los Angeles as 26-year-old Wallie D. Ford, with his 25-year-old wife, Hazel E. Ford. In the 1920 United States census, his race was reported as white, his occupation as a proprietor of a restaurant, and his place of birth as New Zealand. He provided no known place of birth for his parents nor his date of immigration.

A marriage certificate dated June 5, 1924, was issued to Wallie Dodd Ford and Carmen Trevino (or Treviño) in Santa Ana, California. Ford reported that he was a cook, age 26, born in Oregon and living in Los Angeles. Trevino was a 22-year-old native of Mexico also living in Los Angeles. Both provided their race as "Spanish"; Ford claimed that his parents, "Zaradodd" and "Babbjie", were natives of Madrid, Spain.

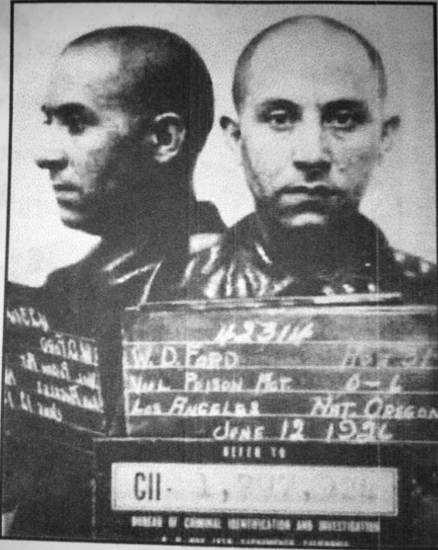
Wallie D. Ford at San Quentin on June 12, 1926.

Ford was arrested again on January 20, 1926, for violation of the California Woolwine Possession Act, and on February 15, 1926, for violation of the State Poison Act. After this second arrest, a Spanish-language paper in Los Angeles described him as a "street politician". Ford was sentenced to six months to six years at San Quentin State Prison on June 12, 1926. According to San Quentin records, Wallie D. Ford was born in Portland, Oregon, on February 25, 1891, the white son of Zared and Beatrice Ford, who were both born in Hawaii. Ford was paroled from San Quentin on May 27, 1929.

In 1934, after Fard Muhammad had departed Detroit, Wallie Ford visited Hazel Barton, the mother of his child, in Los Angeles; she recalled him only eating one meal per day as part of his new lifestyle. Ford gave her self-threading needles in a box from the Marcellene Chemical Company; Knight notes the company sold hair straightener.

The Nation of Islam contests the claim that Wallace Fard Muhammad and Wallie Dodd Ford were the same person.

== Potential link to Moorish Science Temple of America ==
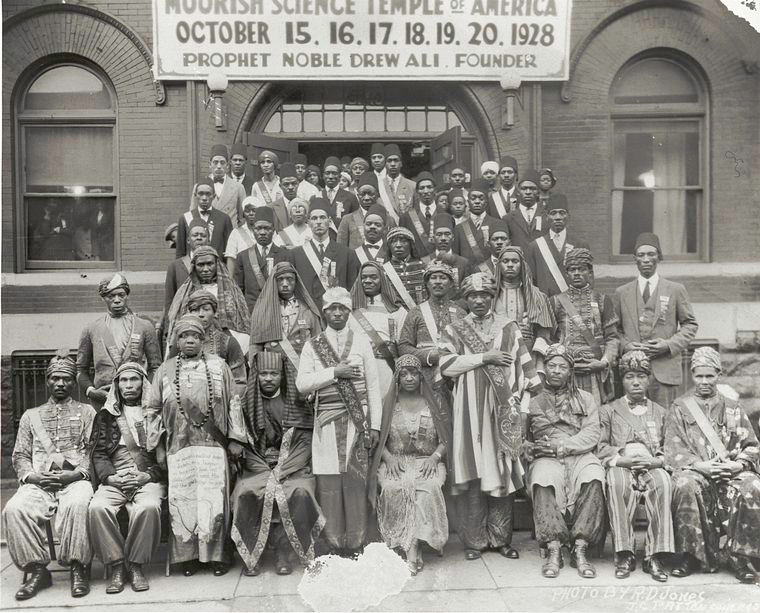
1928 convention of the Moorish Science Temple of America, held in Chicago

In addition to his assertion that Fard was Ford, Evanzz also said that Fard was once a member of the Moorish Science Temple of America, citing as a primary source the 1945 publication by Arna Bontemps and Jack Conroy titled They Seek A City. Authors have also cited E. U. Essien-Udom for this proposition as well. In his 1962 book Black Nationalism: The Search for an Identity, Essien-Udom wrote:

Noble Drew Ali was shot and stabbed in his offices at the Unity Club in Chicago on the night of March 15, 1929. … He was eventually released on bond, but a few weeks later, he died under mysterious circumstances. Some people claim that he died from injuries inflicted by the police while he was in jail. Others, however, suggest that he was killed by [Sheik Claude] Greene's partisans. For some time, one W. D. Fard assumed leadership of the Moorish movement. According to Bontemps and Conroy, Fard claimed that he was the reincarnation of Noble Drew Ali. By 1930 a permanent split developed in the movement. One faction, the Moors, remains faithful to Noble Drew Ali, and the other, which is now led by Elijah Muhammad, remains faithful to Prophet Fard (Master Wallace Fard Muhammad). However, Minister Malcolm X and other leaders of the Nation of Islam have emphatically denied any past connection whatsoever of Elijah Muhammad, Master Wallace Fard Muhammad, or their movement with Nobel Drew Ali's Moorish American Science Temple.

On the question of a connection between the Nation of Islam and the Moorish Science Temple of America, Beynon wrote:

Awakened already to a consciousness of race discrimination, these migrants from the South came into contact with militant movements among northern Negroes. Practically none of them had been in the North prior to the collapse of the Marcus Garvey movement. A few of them had come under the influence of the Moorish-American cult which succeeded it. The effect of both these movements upon the future members of the Nation of Islam was largely indirect. Garvey taught the Negroes that their homeland was Ethiopia. The Noble Drew Ali, the prophet of the Moorish-Americans, proclaimed that these people were 'descendants of Morrocans [Moroccans]'.

Beynon further wrote: "The prophet's message was characterized by his ability to utilize to the fullest measure the environment of his followers. Their physical and economic difficulties alike were used to illustrate the new teaching. Similarly, biblical prophecies and the teachings of Marcus Garvey and Noble Drew Ali were cited as foretelling the coming of the new prophet." Bowen rejects claims that Fard was a member of the MSTA as unsubstantiated.

== FBI's public claims about Fard ==
A declassified Federal Bureau of Investigation (FBI) memorandum dated May 16, 1957, states: "From a review of instant file it does not appear that there has been a concerted effort to locate and fully identify W. D. Fard. In as much as Elijah Muhammad recognizes W.D. Fard as being Allah (God) and claims that Fard is the source of all of his teachings, it is suggested that an exhaustive effort be made to fully identify and locate W. D. Fard and/or members of his family." The FBI took note of the article written by Erdmann Doane Beynon, and it conducted a search for Fard using various aliases including the name "Ford". On October 17, 1957, the FBI located and interviewed Hazel Barton-Ford, Wallie Ford's common-law wife, with whom he had a son named Wallace Dodd Ford, born on September 1, 1920. This son, later also known as Wallace Max Ford, died in 1942. He was serving for the United States Coast Guard, during World War II, at the time of his death. Barton-Ford gave a description of Wallie Ford, and described him as a Caucasian New Zealander. The FBI's search for Fard was officially closed the following year on April 15, 1958. Immigration records did not match any of his aliases. His true identity remains unknown, but there is strong evidence that the Nation of Islam founder Wallace D. Fard was the same man as Wallace Dodd Ford, an inmate in San Quentin Prison. According to Patrick D. Bowen, a PhD candidate at the University of Denver's Iliff School of Theology, fingerprints and photographs taken from San Quentin Prison matched those of Fard taken during the 1930s in Detroit; furthermore, in San Quentin he almost certainly came in contact with African American Muslim preachers and converts also incarcerated there.

On August 15, 1959, the FBI sent a story to the Chicago New Crusader newspaper, stating that Fard was a "Turkish-born Nazi agent who worked for Hitler in World War II". According to the FBI story, Fard was a "Muslim from Turkey who had come to the United States in the early 1900s. He had met Muhammad in prison … where the two men plotted a confidence game in which followers were charged a fee to become Muslims."

After the story was published, Elijah Muhammad and Malcolm X subsequently charged black media outlets, which reprinted the accusation in large numbers, with running the story without requesting a response from the Nation of Islam.

According to the FBI, Fard was linked to the Pacific Movement of the Eastern World, a pro-Japanese movement of African Americans which promoted the idea that the Empire of Japan was the champion of all non-white peoples, and to senior members of the Black Dragon Society, such as Satokata Takahashi and Ashima Takis. The FBI charged that Takahashi had been an influential presence in the Nation of Islam. He spoke as a guest at the NOI temples in Detroit and Chicago. A February 19, 1963, FBI memorandum states: "In connection with efforts to disrupt and curb growth of the NOI, extensive research has been conducted into various files maintained by this office. Among the files reviewed was that of Wallace Dodd Ford." Five months later, in July 1963, the FBI told the Los Angeles Evening Herald-Examiner that Fard was actually Wallace Dodd Ford. The paper published the story in an article titled "Black Muslim Founder Exposed As White." An FBI memorandum dated August 1963 states that the FBI had not been able to verify his birthdate or birthplace, and "he was last heard from in 1934."

== Records purportedly related to Wallace Fard Muhammad ==
Source	Name	Reported Place of Birth	Reported Date of Birth	Comments
1906 passenger list	Wallie Dad Khan	India	Age 18 (c. 1888)	A "Mohammedan", i.e., Muslim. Last residence in Kabul. Able to read and write. Had two relatives or friends, Nageeb and Gool Ahmed Khan.
1909 naturalization	Wali Fred Dad	Hong Kong	Feb 14, 1882	Claimed to be "Subject of Alphonso xiii King of Spain" and had arrived in San Francisco via Hong Kong in January 1904. Was living in Eugene, Oregon. Nation of Islam teaches that Fard's father was named Alphonso.
1910 census	Fred Conn	Afghanistan	Age 25 (c. 1885)	Mother and father also from Afghanistan. Immigrated in 1904, naturalized citizen. Spoke Afghan and was a tamale maker, supposedly not able to read or write.
April 20, 1914 Marriage Certificate to Pearl Allen	Fred Dodd	Europe	Age 23 (c. 1891)	Allen was a Native American teenager, Fred Dodd identified as a salesman who was born in Europe along with both his parents. Marriage in Portland, Multnomah County, Oregon.
1917 draft card	Wallie Dodd Fard	Shinka, Afghanistan	Feb 26, 1893	Restaurant owner in Los Angeles.
1920 census	Wallie D. Ford	New Zealand	Age 26 (c. 1894)	Living in Los Angeles.
1920 birth certificate of child with Hazel	Wallace Dodd Ford	New Zealand	Age 26 (c. 1894)	Father identifies as white.
1924 marriage certificate to Carmen Trevino	Wallie Dodd Ford	Native of Oregon	Age 26 (c. 1898)	Claimed his parents "Zaradodd Ford" and "Babbjie" were natives of Madrid, Spain.
1926 prison records	Wallie D. Ford	Portland, Oregon	February 25, 1891 Age 31 (c. 1895)	Claimed his parents were Zared and Beatrice Ford of Hawaii, and that Zared operated Ford Bottling Works in Honolulu.
1930 census	William D. Fard	Oregon	Age 32 (c. 1898)	Claimed father from Argentina, mother from Oregon. Listed occupation is salesman in clothing industry. Listed as veteran of World War I.
NOI tradition	Master Fard Muhammad	Mecca	February 26, 1877	Son of a black father and white mother. Father named Alphonso and termed the Mahdi, mother named Bibi Ji (Baby Gee). Alphonso was also the name of the monarch renounced by Wali Fred Dad in his 1909 naturalization.

== Bibliography ==
- Arian, A.K. (2017). Chameleon: The True Story of W.D. Fard. Xis Books. ISBN 978-0977911257.
- Batey, Anton; Morris, Kevin (2025). W.D. Fard's First Footsteps in America: The Trail in Oregon. Independently published. ISBN 9798280341470.
- Beynon, Erdmann Doane (May 1, 1938). "The Voodoo Cult among Negro migrants in Detroit". American Journal of Sociology. 43 (6): 894–907. doi:10.1086/217872. JSTOR 2768686. S2CID 144039917.
- Bontemps, Arna; Conroy, Jack (1945). "Beloved and scattered millions". They Seek a City. Doubleday, Doran and Company. ASIN B0007E2JSU. OCLC 1444797.
- Bowen, Patrick D. (2017). "W.D. Fard". A History of Conversion to Islam in the United States, Volume 2: The African American Islamic Renaissance, 1920–1975. Boston: Brill. pp. 240–276. doi:10.1163/9789004354371_008. ISBN 9789004354371.
- Essien-Udom, E.U. (1995). Black Nationalism: the Search for an Identity. Chicago, Illinois, United States: University of Chicago Press. ISBN 9780226218533.
- Evanzz, Karl (2011) [1999]. The Messenger: The Rise and Fall of Elijah Muhammad (3 ed.). New York City, New York, United States: Knopf Doubleday. ISBN 9780307805201 – via Google Books.
- Gibson, Dawn-Marie (2012). A History of the Nation of Islam: Race, Islam, and the Quest for Freedom. Praeger. ISBN 978-0-313-39807-0.
- Hakim, Nasir (1996). The True History of Master Fard Muhammad. Secretaries MEMPS Ministries. ISBN 1-884855-78-4.
- Morrow, John Andrew (2019). Finding W.D. Fard: Unveiling the Identity of the Founder of the Nation of Islam. Newcastle upon Tyne, England, United Kingdom: Cambridge Scholars Publishing. ISBN 9781527524897 – via Google Books.
- Morrow, John Andrew; Muhammad, Bilal (2025-08-15). W. D. Fard: The Man, Myth, and Mystery Behind the Nation of Islam. Washington: Academica Press. ISBN 978-1-68053-388-0.
- Muhammad, Elijah (1965). Message to the Blackman in America. Muhammad's Temple No 2. ISBN 978-1-929594-01-6.
- Muhammad, Fard (1993). The Supreme Wisdom Lessons by Master Fard Muhammad: to His Servant, The Honorable Elijah Muhammad for The Lost-Found Nation of Islam in North America (PDF). CreateSpace Independent Publishing Platform. ISBN 978-1442165403.
