= Phoenicia International Festival of the Voice =

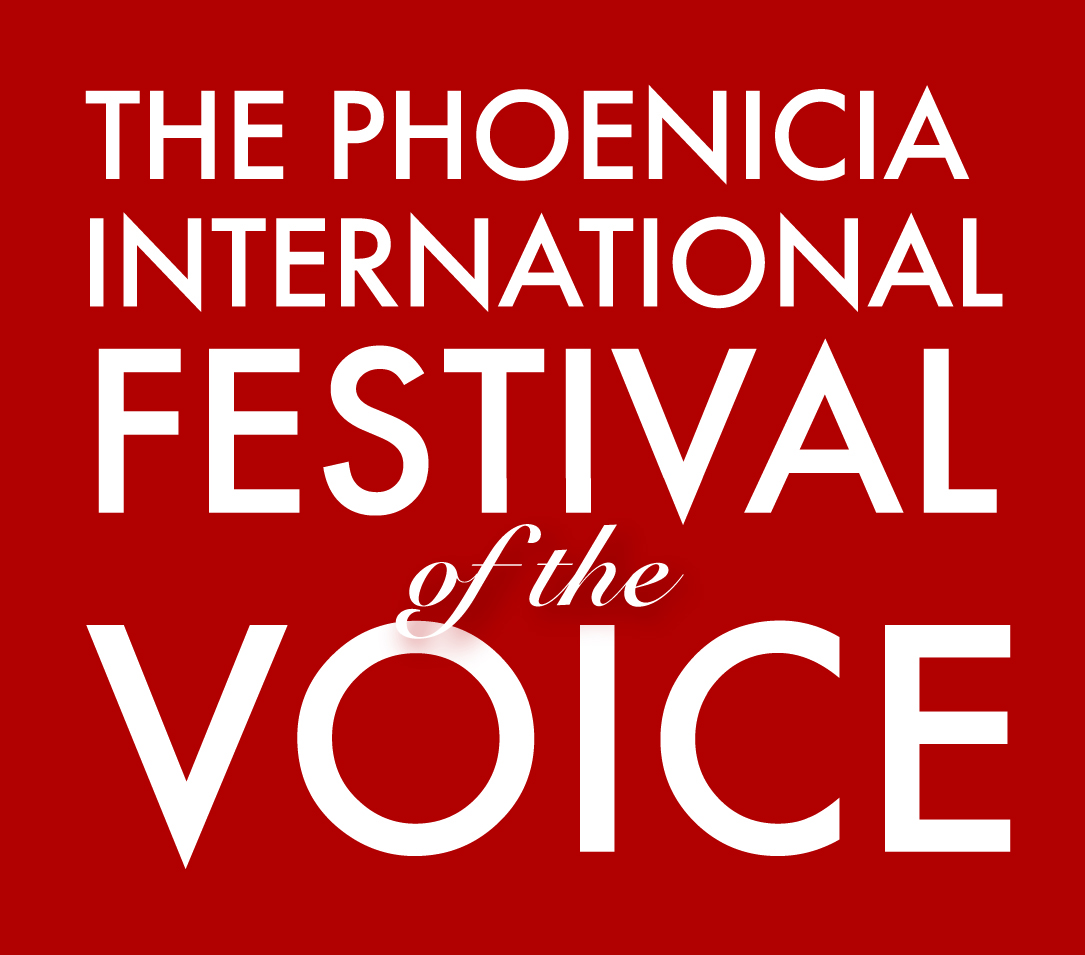
Official logo created in 2011

The Phoenicia International Festival of the Voice is an annual festival of vocal music held in Phoenicia, New York during the first week of August. The Festival was founded in 2010 and includes a variety of vocal music performances including opera, gospel music, world music, and musical theatre. In 2012 the Ulster County Regional Chamber of Commerce awarded the festival "Best Cultural Event of the year". Its Mission: Elevate the human spirit and enhance community through the power of voice and music. The Phoenicia International Festival of the Voice is a program of The Phoenicia Festival of The Voice Foundation.

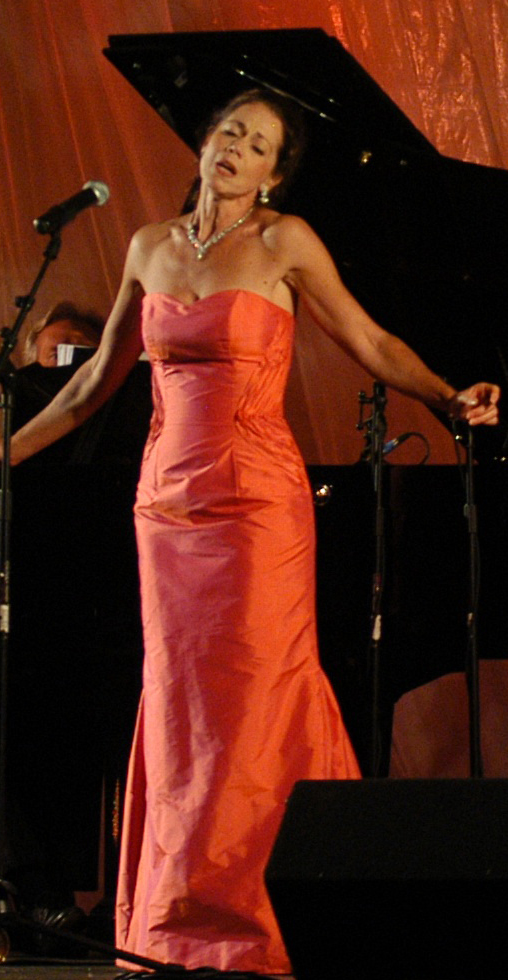
Elizabeth Futral performing at the 2010 festival

== History ==
=== 2010 ===
The festival grew out of a one-off concert in 2009, "Opera under the Stars", to raise money for a children's playground in Phoenicia, a small hamlet in the Catskills. The concert was organized and performed by opera singers who live in Phoenicia—baritone Kerry Henderson, mezzo-soprano Maria Todaro and baritone Louis Otey. The success of the concert led to the first official festival the following year, a three-day event featuring performances by Elizabeth Futral and the Native American flutist Joseph Firecrow.

=== 2011 ===
The festival expanded to four days and offered 22 events attracting over 4,000 people to Phoenicia. Highlights included Mozart's Don Giovanni with a full orchestra conducted by Steven White starting baritones Kerry Henderson and Louis Otey, the Voices of Distinction Gala starring soprano Lauren Flanigan, and performances by gospel singer Rozz Morehead and Arabic oud master Simon Shaheen.

=== 2012 ===
In 2012, the festival attracted over 5,000 people. Festival highlights included a performance of Madama Butterfly, starring Yunah Lee and Richard Troxell, and a gala titled "Voice of Distinction: Broadway", featuring established Broadway professionals as well as newcomers. The festival closed with a presentation of Peter Schickele's 12 Months, a concerto for piano and choir, narrated by the composer and featuring Justin Kolb and Barry Banks.

=== 2013 ===
The Voices of Distinction Gala celebrated the bicentennial of Richard Wagner and featured Jeanne Michele Charbonet, Victoria Livengood, Alfred Walker, Eduardo Villa, Babette Hierholzer and Jurgen Apell. The festival's centerpiece was Verdi's Rigoletto. The opera, selected to honor the bicentennial of Verdi's birth, was conducted by Steven White with guest artists Barry Banks, Nancy Allen Lundy and Louis Otey. Other performances included a cantorial concert by Cantor Jack Mendelson of Westchester County's Temple Israel; Terrence McNally's Master Class, featuring Irene Glezos; Two's Company.. Three's a Crowd, a piano / orator collaboration concert with Carey Harrison and Justin Kolb; Spirit of Sephardad, featuring Gerard Edery. The festival concluded with Verdi's Requiem, conducted by David Wroe and featuring soloists Rosa D'Imperio, Maria Todaro, Stephan Kirchgraber and Eduardo Villa.

Other features of the 2013 festival included a first-time offering of a vocal workshop available to the public, a gospel celebration concert, lectures, story telling for children and adults, and a master class for young singers.

=== 2014 ===
Voices of Distinction: Baroque with Brian Asawa, Barber of Seville with Lucas Meachem, Maria Todaro directed by Beth Greenberg, El Amor Brujo by Manuel de Falla, La Misa Criolla, Jose Todaro and his "Mediterranean Fiesta", The Seven Favorite Maladie of Ludwig van Beethoven by Carey Harrison with Justin Kolb, Gospel, Festival Orchestra and choir directed by David Wroe and Elizabeth Scott.

=== 2015 ===
Voices of Distinction: Red, White and Blues with Sheila Jordon, Jack DeJohnette, EliseTestone, Maria-Helena De Oliveira, David Bankston, Jose Todaro, Emily Drennan, introducing Lucia Legnini young local artist, under the baton of David Wroe with the Phoenicia International Festival of the Voice Chorus. Festival, S.Temperley's play Souvenir, The Medium by Menotti with Metropolitan opera star Victoria Linvengood, the premiere of Opera Do Not Go Gentle - The Last Days of Dylan and Caitlin by Robert Manno with Emilly Pulley, Philip Cutlip stage directed by Sam Helfrich with Lucas Meachem, Of Mice And Men, Opera by Carlisle Floyd with Malcolm MacKenzie, Michael R.Hendrick, Aaron Blake, Nancy Allen Lundy, American Classics: with Lauren Flanigan, Bradley Smoak, Maria Todaro, Keith Phares; music of Ricky Ian Gordon, Jake Heggie, Peter Schickele, and the premiere of MASQUE: The Tempest by Robert Cucinotta. The Cambridge Chamber singers: Music in the Time of Shakespeare and Cervantes, Barbershop Voices of Gotham, Down to The Roots: Inuit, Native American and Hawaiian singing art, Gospel with Ralphine Childs, Sacred Harp: Shape Notes Workshop for All, Lectures and Masterclasses, The Little Night Music by Stephen Sondheim with Ron Raines, Susan Powell, Rosaling Elias, Shelby Dangerfield, Darik Knutsen, Sarah Heltzel under the baton of Gerald Steichen.

=== 2016 ===
The Bard and The British Isles, Opening Gala: rock The Beatles with the Paul Green Rock Academy featuring young local artist such as Diggy Lessard, son of Stefan Lessard, Kiss me Kate Stage direction: Lee Roy Reams, conductor: Gerald Steichen, Susan Powell, Richard White, Jennifer DiDominici, John Viscardi, Anthony Laciura, David Bankston, Sarah Stipe, Andrew Hoben, Thomas Pasatieri's Three Shakespearean Monologues with Lauren Flanigan, Jamilyn Manning-White, Douglas Martin, Enoch Arden with Narrator, Carey Harrison, son of Rex Harrison and Pianist Justin Kolb, Hamlet For Once and For All by Carey Harrison, A Spirited Journey on Land and Sea with Sing Out! CT young Voices Choral Group created by Alecia Evans, World Premiere: Muse Of Fire written and directed by local young playwright Brandon Cobalt with New Genesis Productions' most experienced young actors, Otello by Verdi under the baton of David Wroe, stage direction Beth Greenberg, Chorus Master David Mayfield, Limmie Pulliam, Eleni Calenos, Daniel Sutin, Aaron Blake, Bradley Smoak, Lindsay Ammann FofV Chorus and Orchestra, Sacred Harp: Shape Notes Workshop for All, Lectures and Masterclasses, grand finale was a Festiva Celtic Celebration with Ann Cragn Og, Joy Dunlop, Doimnic Mac Giolla Bhride, Noeleen Ni Cholla, Siobhan Butler, James Ruff, D'amby Project.

=== 2017 ===
Three days, 21 events, 6,000 attendees

A French Affair: Opening Gala with Lucas Meachem, Irina Meachem, Lauren Flanigan, voice impersonator Olivier Laurent, Mireille Asselin, David Mayfield. Les Trois Mousquetaires, World Premiere. Music by Mitchell Bach, Libretto by Maria Todaro with Kyle Albertson, John Viscardi, Joseph Brent, Jason Slayden, Louis Otey, Oswaldo Irahetra, Sarah Heltzel, Joan-Marie Peitscher, Megan Weston, Robert Balonek. Music direction: Michael Fennelly. La Boheme with conductor David Wroe, stage director Maria Todaro, Chorus Master David Mayfield, John Osborn (first 'Rodolfo), Richard Bernstein, Lynette Tapia, Lucas Meachem, Kevin Glavin, Daniel Scofield, Mireille Asselin, FofV Chorus and Orchestra The Spiritual Side of Duke : a Gospel/ Jazz concert starring John Lumpkin

=== 2018 ===
Three days, 23 events, 7,000 attendees

Sirens of Gospel featuring Jazz Star Damien Sneed and The Levites. Voices of The Sirens featuring women a cappella group: Lady Parts Carmen opera by Bizet with conductor David Wroe, stage director Maria Todaro, Chorus Master Michael Fennelly, Ginger Costa-Jackson, Adam Diegel, Kyle Alberston, Myriam Costa-Jackson, Matthew Curran, Isai Jess Munoz, Brian James Meyer FofV Chorus and Orchestra Bleeker Street, Playwright Eric Grant. Stage Direction Philip Mansfield. La Cambiale di Matrimonio, opera by Rossini, stage direction Beth Greenberg, Music Direction: David Mayfield Masterclasses with former Metropolitan Opera tenor Richard Leech Beauties of Broadway Starring Marissa McGowan, Music Direction David Wroe FofV Orchestra, Piano: Douglas Jay Martin

=== 2019 ===
3 days, 15 performances. 7000 attendees

10 Year Gala Celebration starring Morris Robinson, Barry Banks, Louis Otey, Anthony Laciura, Maria Todaro, Kyle Albertson, Toby Newman Banks, Michelle Jennings, Nancy Allen Lundy- featuring excerpts from many past Festival of the Voice productions- Conducted by David Wroe with pianists Douglas Martin and David Mayfield. Lady Parts (female acappella quartet) "Music of the Abolition Movement" Souvenir (by Stephen Temperley) with Bob Stillman as 'Cosme McMoon' and Liz McCartney as 'Florence Foster Jenkins'- Temperley appeared and made a speech before each show. 'Music of the African Diaspora' featuring pianist Justin Kolb and narrator Carey Harrison. 'Excerpts from Treemonisha'- With music reimagined and restructured by Houston Grand Opera composer-in-residence, Damien Sneed- Conductor/Arranger/Pianist; Brandie Sutton - Treemonisha; Morris Robinson - Ned; Norman Shankle - Remus; Geraldine McMillan - Monisha; Daniel Rich - Zodzetrick; Parson Alltalk - Luddud; Edward Washington-Cephus/Andy; Arcia Marie Stokes- Lucy 'Elisir d'Amore' (Donizetti)- reimagined and set in a West African village by stage director, Maria Todaro, with all African-American cast and chorus. Jasmine Habersham - Adina; Orson van Gay II - Nemorino; Rodney Nelman - Dr. Dulcamara; Leroy Davis - Sgt. Belcore; Jordan Taylor -Giannetta; David Wroe, Conductor; Maria Todaro- stage director; David Mayfield - Chorus Master and Rehearsal Pianist; Sylvestre K. Akakpo Adzaku - Drummer; Mamoudou Konater -Dancer; Pia Monique Murray - Dancer; Phoenicia Festival of the Voice Orchestra — Featuring All African-American Chorus, Chickens, Goats. 'Jesus Christ Superstar' A celebration of the original 1970 double album, performed by the incredible Master Program students of Paul Green Rock Academy Closeing Gala Celebrating the talent-rich Catskills- Loren Daniels and Exchange featuring : Loren Daniels; Robert Warren; Harvey Boyer and his children's chorus; The Phoenicia International Festival of the Voice Chorus and The Woodstock Rock Academy.

=== 2020 ===
The Phoenicia Int. Festival of the Voice led the way on multiple levels for the performing arts during the Covid-19 pandemic. After 10 years of offering a three-day summertime potpourri of opera, master classes, plays, lectures, and vocal performances of every kind in the small hamlet of Phoenicia, executive director, Maria Todaro and her team were forced by the pandemic to find a new way to fulfill their mission of showing how the power of the human voice can inspire, empower, heal, and uplift all who hear it. For safety reasons, the festival was moved to a former IBM parking lot in Kingston, NY where it presented Puccini's masterpiece 'Tosca' : A live, drive-in opera performance with internationally renowned singers, full orchestra, ‘volumetric video,’ and complete Covid safety—the first such performance anywhere in the United States. How does one turn a war-horse of an opera that takes place in 1800 into contemporary entertainment whose performers remain “distanced” yet believable? Answer: With space-age staging endowing the villain with super-powers; that way, love and lust, terror and triumph can all be expressed fully from a distance—especially when enhanced by a segment of virtual reality, not to mention by the Festival’s signature: great voices wowing the audience with their beauty and expressiveness.

Maria Todaro conceived 'Tosca' with new and novel technical innovations, all beautifully coordinated by the Festival’s production manager, Dan Jobbins: a whole new sound system designed to cut out any delays in the sound reaching all parts of the expansive parking lot, plus the car radio sync by Mike Seddon’s team at Live Sound Inc., video for the volumetric virtual bit by Phosphor, Mixed Space Studios and Evercoast—the altered-reality portion broadcast on the Jumbotrons by Springboard Team and James Sapione, camera director.

The original cast was to be Joyce Elkhoury as 'Tosca', Dimitri Pittas as 'Cavaradossi' and Kyle Albertson as 'Scarpia'. Due to travel and covid restrictions, 'Tosca' was sung by veteran Elizabeth Blancke-Biggs and 'Cavaradossi' by rising young star, Jonathan Tetelman. Spoletta was Edward Washington, Paul Grosvenor did double duty as 'Angelotti' and 'Sciarrone' and Timothy Lafontaine was the 'Sacristan'. The Festival orchestra was conducted by French star, Audrey Saint-Gil.

Besides presenting the 1st US Drive-in Live performance in the nation, Todaro and the Festival of the Voice launched a whole new path for opera borrowing the vocabulary of video games. In order to create jobs for artists, the Phoenicia Festival of the Voice migrated to Naples, Fl. in the winter to present concerts in the form of 'salon recitals' with major artists such as Morris Robinson, Adam Diegel, Elizabeth Caballero, Jasmine Habersham, Kyle Albertson and Richard Troxell.

== Advisory board ==
Members of the Advisory Board of the Festival of the Voice include Roberto Alagna, Deborah Voigt, Frederica von Stade, Leon Botstein, Peter Schickele, Robert Cucinotta, Ira Siff and as of 2014, Georges Prêtre.
