= Rastafari in Africa =

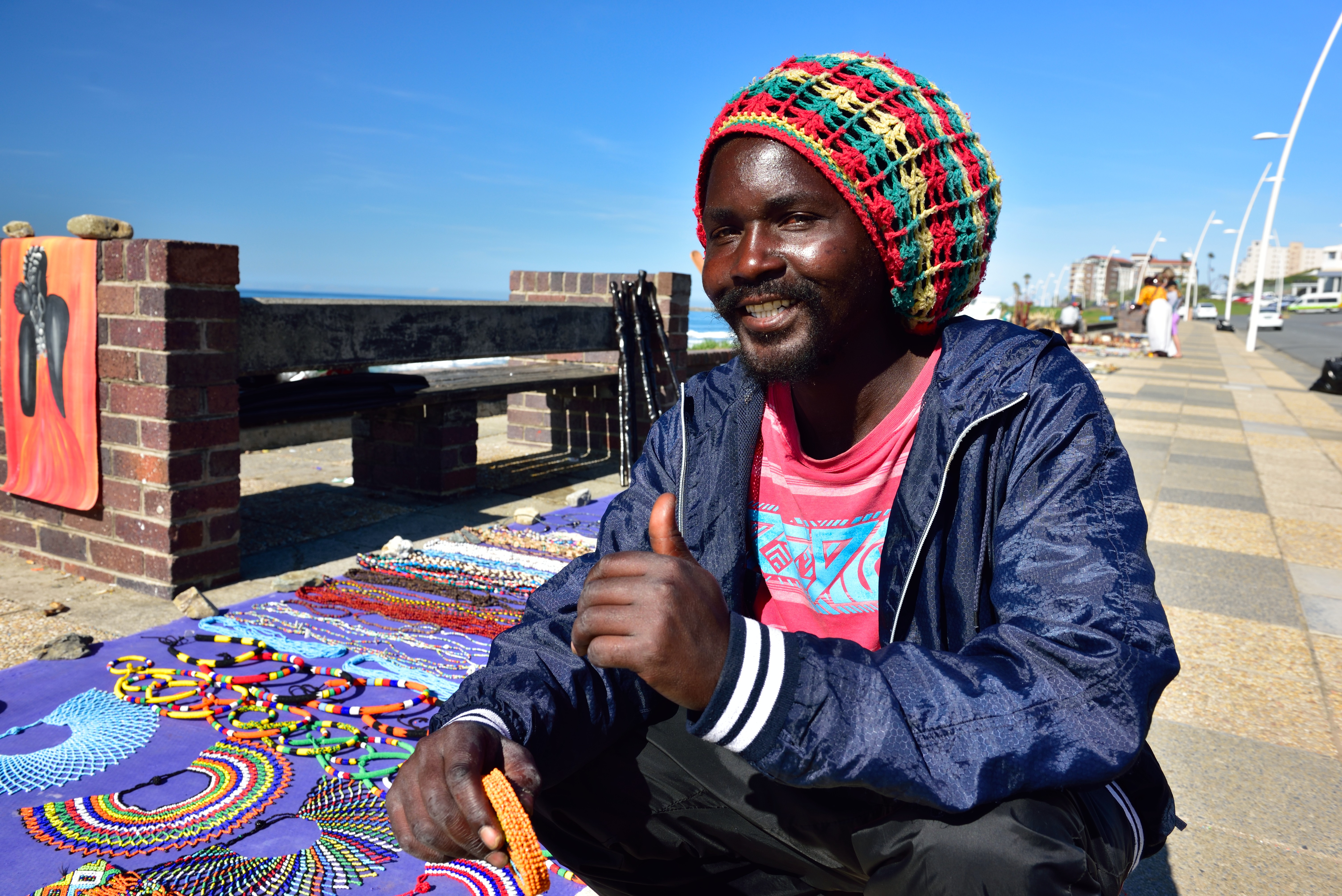
A Rasta street vendor in South Africa's Eastern Cape

Rastafari, a religion that emerged in Jamaica during the 1930s, promoted an Afrocentric ideology. In particular, it draws on Ethiopianism in according Ethiopia a particularly important place in its worldview.

Since at least the 1960s, Rastafari has established a presence in Africa itself. This partly arose from Jamaican Rastas moving to Africa, but alternatively involved Africans converting to the religion.

== West Africa ==
Some Rastas in the African diaspora have followed through with their beliefs about resettlement in Africa, with Ghana and Nigeria being particularly favoured. In West Africa, Rastafari has spread largely through the popularity of reggae, gaining a larger presence in Anglophone areas than their Francophone counterparts.

Caribbean Rastas arrived in Ghana during the 1960s, encouraged by its first post-independence president, Kwame Nkrumah, while some native Ghanaians also converted to the religion. The largest congregation of Rastas has been in southern parts of Ghana, around Accra, Tema, and the Cape Coast, although Rasta communities also exist in the Muslim-majority area of northern Ghana. Middleton suggests that Rasta migrants' dreadlocks resembled the hairstyles of the native fetish priests, which may have assisted the presentation of these Rastas as having authentic African roots in Ghanaian society. Ghanaian Rastas have also complained of social ostracism and prosecution for cannabis possession, while non-Rastas in Ghana often consider them to be "drop-outs", "too Western", and "not African enough".

A smaller number of Rastas are found in Muslim-majority countries of West Africa, such as Gambia and Senegal. One West African group that wear dreadlocks are the Baye Faal, a Mouride sect in Senegambia, some of whose practitioners have started calling themselves "Rastas" in reference to their visual similarity to Rastafari. The popularity of dreadlocks and marijuana among the Baye Faal may have been spread in large part through access to Rasta-influenced reggae in the 1970s. A small community of Rastas also appeared in Burkina Faso.

== East Africa ==
In the 1960s, a Rasta settlement was established in Shashamane, Ethiopia, on land made available by Haile Selassie's Ethiopian World Federation. The community faced many problems; 500 acres were confiscated by the Marxist government of Mengistu Haile Mariam. There were also conflicts with local Ethiopians, who largely regarded the incoming Rastas, and their Ethiopian-born children, as foreigners. The Shashamane community peaked at a population of 2,000, although subsequently declined to around 200.

By the early 1990s, a Rasta community existed in Nairobi, Kenya, whose approach to the religion was informed both by reggae and by traditional Kikuyu religion. Rastafari groups have also appeared in Zimbabwe, Malawi and in South Africa; in 2008, there were at least 12,000 Rastas in the country. At an African Union/Caribbean Diaspora conference in South Africa in 2005, a statement was released characterising Rastafari as a force for integration of Africa and the African diaspora.
