= Hierholzer =

Hierholzer is a surname. Notable people with the surname include:

- Babette Hierholzer (born 1957), German-born American pianist
- Carl Hierholzer (1840–1871), German mathematician
