= Pacific Movement of the Eastern World =

1930s North American based pro-Japanese movement of African Americans

The Pacific Movement of the Eastern World (PMEW) was a 1930s North American based pro-Japanese movement of African Americans which promoted the idea that Japan was the champion of all non-white peoples.

The Japanese ultra-nationalist Black Dragon Society was an influence upon the PMEW. The Black Dragon Society was a paramilitary organization, with close ties to Japan, which viewed the United States as Japan's enemy in World War II. The organization was frequently taken advantage of by one of its founders, Ashima Takis, who ultimately was arrested for embezzling funds from the group.

== Origins ==
The Pacific Movement of the Eastern World was founded in Chicago around 1932 by Satokata Takahashi. Takahashi reportedly recruited Ashima Takis and his Chinese companion, Moy Liang, into the leadership of the organization. The organization preached worldwide unity of colored races under the leadership of Japan. When its president Ashima Takis moved to St. Louis in 1933, membership took off.

Takis soon associated himself with Burt Cornish and Walter Lee Peeples of the United Negro Improvement Association (UNIA) and claimed that the New York City branch of the organisation was affiliated with Japan. Cornish and Peeples soon set up a (PMEW) branch in St. Louis with the help of Moy Liang, an immaculately dressed Chinese man with a patrician demeanor.

Adopting a banner composed of black, yellow and brown, the organization began to grow in the poor African American community in Missouri. FBI reports claimed that there were four Japanese men agitating in the area at that time. The frequent open air meetings were marked by anti-white sentiments, particularly regarding the historical use of African Americans in wars by the United States, followed by refusing to let them share in the spoils of war.

The PMEW gained membership as a result of the personality of Ashima Takis, who pretended to have a thick Japanese accent, and his promises of a color-blind utopia in Japan.

== Front organization for Ashima Takis ==
Ashima Takis, who also used the pseudonyms Policarpio Manansala and Itakake Koo, president of the PMEW and one of the founders of the organization, made numerous false statements during his tenure. In order to raise black membership he spoke in a thick Japanese accent. His partner Cornish said Takis was actually quite fluent but spoke with an accent because "Your people wouldn't believe me if I spoke too well." Takis also raised membership by downplaying racism in Japan, "promising his Negro audience that if they moved to Japan they would be treated as equals, have jobs at better pay than they could get here, and could even marry Japanese women." Ashima Takis lied to his audience about the size of the organization, stating that the group that formed in Saint Louis was "the one thousandth organized in this country, and that outside of this city there were 165,000 members."

Membership was not free. For those wanting to go to Japan, a membership in 1933 cost $5.50 ($74 in 2005 inflation-adjusted dollars ). For those not wanting to go to Japan, membership was $1.00 ($13.00 in 2005 inflation-adjusted dollars ). Cornish stated that more than 100 people joined the PMEW in hopes of moving to Japan and several thousand joined at the lower price.

Ashima Takis also posed as a physician and a faith healer. Cornish stated Takis claimed he was a doctor but he was not licensed to practice in the United States, although he apparently studied medicine at a university. Cornish also states that Ashima held himself out to be a faith healer to the Negro people and that many regarded themselves as cured of various ailments after Takis laid hands on them.

When Japan invaded Manchuria in China, Takis fell out with the PMEW and his Chinese compatriot Liang. He eventually moved to New York, where he helped form the Ethiopian Pacific Movement.

In December 1939, Takis returned to St Louis and the PMEW. He was welcomed back but insisted he be referred to by the pseudonym Mimo de Guzman. Takis joined in various attempts to prepare for a Japanese invasion by gathering a small arsenal. However, Takis fled after he was reported to the police for embezzling money from the PMEW. Ashima Takis was not taken into custody until two years later. In 1942, he was sentenced to three years in prison for forgery.

== Political goals ==
A new member was initiated into the pseudo-masonic organization, which had a handshake and password. The organisation drew membership from the Communist Party of America, and some white people avoided Carr Park, a frequent St. Louis venue, on account of the atmosphere.

Meetings featured talks on such issues as The Struggle of the darker races of the World, Why the Filipinos Want Freedom and China, Old and New. At various times, they had schemes for African Americans to relocate to Japan, Brazil, and Africa. In the early days, over 100 people paid $5.50 to be put on a list of emigrants to Japan, with several thousand paying $1 for general membership. According to the investigating Federal attorney, Harry C Blanton, members were already picking out which farms they would take over following a Japanese invasion.

The organization was heavily influenced by Marcus Garvey's UNIA, adopting the motto: "Sow no evil to reap the good-Asia for the Asiatics, Africa for the Africans". The general stated aims were:

1 Universal brotherhood and peace.
2 Promotion of understanding and friendship of all peoples of the world.
3 Preservation and protection of the legal rights of the oppressed races.
4 Self-determination of every race.
5 Reforms through constitutional methods.
6 Preservation of the territorial integrity and political independence of every country.
7 Cultivation of the spirit of love for the ancestral homes of dark peoples.
8 Encouragement for the return of those peoples who find no opportunity for development in the United States, and the establishment of a government of their own in the land of their fathers.

The PMEW endorsed Senator Edward P. Costigan's anti-lynching legislation, but rejected the Communist Party USA's efforts to unionize workers in the nut-processing industry. Supporters were also advised to place a purple cloth in their windows in the event of Japanese invasion.

== Organizing ==
Takis and Cornish soon formed a breakaway organization, the Original Independent Benevolent Afro-Pacific Movement of the World (OIBAPMW) after being ousted from the PMEW leadership by Peeples and Takahashi. They set up operating in the Kansas City area, and sometimes posed as PMEW representatives. In preparation for the future war of racial salvation, they called on African Americans to train in modern warfare, and offered a subscription to a "colored aviation school". They also offered opportunities for African-Americans to homestead in Japan. Takis fell out with Peeples and went to organize in the Indianapolis, Cincinnati, Dayton and Pittsburgh before moving to the New York City - New Jersey area. Here, he came into contact with the Black Hebrew organization, the House of Israel, co-founding the Ethiopian Pacific Movement with Robert O. Jordan, of Harlem.

Back in Missouri, sharecroppers were facing increasing numbers of evictions following the Agricultural Adjustment Act of 1933. With George Cruz, a Filipino, the rival organizations offered salvation arising from a successful Japanese invasion, and continued to organize in Steele, Caruthersville, Wardell, Hermondale, Bragg City, Pascola in Pemiscot County; New Madrid and Portageville in New Madrid County, Sikeston (Scott County); Charleston (Mississippi County) and Cape Girardeau (Cape Girardeau County). John Macwhite claimed to have addressed a meeting of 2,500 cotton pickers during this period.

== Repression ==
Cruz and his wife were arrested in Blytheville, Arkansas, in August 1934, but were quickly released. Shortly after this, four PMEW members were arrested and put on trial in Steele, Missouri, following disquiet by African American preachers and white cotton planters. While the defenders pleaded innocence, blaming the OIBAPM for any unrest, the prosecutor was openly racist, suggesting that the four had no business to be driving around in a high powered Chrysler car. The four were sentenced to one year in jail. Before sentencing, however, the judge and constable, stepped outside to allow a mob of two hundred white spectators to invade the building and beat the defendants. Their lawyer fled to Cape Girardeau, ninety miles away. The NAACP provided lawyers in St. Louis, who filed a case of Habeas corpus. The case was heard before the Missouri Supreme Court in Jefferson City, which quashed the sentences saying that no legal trial had taken place.

== More rivalry ==
Following the Italian invasion of Ethiopia in October 1935, the Ethiopian World Federation (EWF) spread from its home in New York City through the St Louis region drawing away many PMEW members. However, many of these returned following dissension in the EWF ranks. David Erwin, the new president, clarified that "The colors of the Pacific Movement include the Black, Yellow, Red and Brown races, which would naturally accept Indians, Chinese, Japanese, Australians or any division of mankind less than White as members; while the Ethiopian Federation calls for Blacks only." Japan was declared the champion of all "dark and colored races".

== World War II ==
The movement moved from St. Louis to East St. Louis, Illinois in 1940 and with the FBI requesting a grand jury investigation for espionage in 1942.

During the war, one white member and four black members of the Ethiopian Pacific Movement, including Leonard Jordan, were prosecuted for sedition and seditious conspiracy, for conspiring create a pro-Japanese element in Harlem and create a "world empire for the dark races." The white member, Joseph Hartrey, pleaded guilty, while the others, Jordan, James Henry Thornhill, Lester Eugene Holmes, and Reverend Ralph Gene Best were found guilty at trial, by a jury which included three blacks. U.S. District Judge Clarence G. Galston sentenced Jordan to 10 years in prison plus a $10,000 fine, Thornhill to 8 years in prison, Holmes to 7 years in prison, and Reverend Best to four years in prison, and Hartrey to six years in prison. Galston noted that the collections at weekly meetings were far too small to support Jordan, indicating that he'd received funds from the Japanese government. He said that if there was proof of the conspiracy making ground, he "would have unhesitatingly imposed the maximum sentence, 40 years."

== See also ==
- Peace Movement of Ethiopia
