= Essien =

Essien is a surname of independent Efik/Ibibio and Akan origin. In Efik and Ibibio, the “esien” was traditionally the gathering place of families and villagers. People born in such a place, or simply outside the house, were named Essien, and this became a payronymic. In Akan cultures, it is an Anglicised form of the traditional name for the sixth-born son, Esia.

== Notable people with the name ==
- E. U. Essien-Udom (1928–2002), Nigerian professor
- Emmanuel Essien, Nigerian politician
- Essiën Bassey (born 2006), Ghanaian footballer
- Kweku Essien (born 1984), Ghanaian footballer, currently playing for Eleven Wise
- Loick Essien (born 1990), British musician
- Michael Essien (born 1982), Ghanaian former footballer, currently coaching FC Nordsjælland.
- Nduese Essien (born 1944), Nigerian politician
- Okon Flo Essien (born 1981), Nigerian footballer, currently playing for Đồng Tâm Long An F.C.

== See also ==
- Essien Udim, a local government area of Nigeria
