= Mittie Maude Lena Gordon =

American Black nationalist (1889–1961)

- Born: Mittie Maude Lena Nelson; August 2, 1889; Webster Parish, Louisiana, U.S.
- Died: June 16, 1961 (aged 71)
- Occupation: Activist

Mittie Maude Lena Gordon (née Nelson, August 2, 1889 – June 16, 1961) was an American black nationalist who established the Peace Movement of Ethiopia. The organization advocated for black emigration to West Africa in response to racial discrimination and white supremacy.

== Early life ==
Gordon was born Mittie Maude Lena Nelson in Webster Parish, Louisiana. Dismayed at the poor educational and job prospects in Louisiana, Gordon's family moved to Hope, Arkansas, when she was a child, where she grew up with her nine siblings. Her father, the son of former slaves and a minister in the Colored Methodist Episcopal Church (CME), discovered that the schools were no better for black students in Arkansas and decided to homeschool his children himself. Through her father, she learned about the Pan-Africanist ideas of Bishop Henry McNeal Turner, who advocated that American former slaves should resettle in Africa, and American Blacks shared a common struggle with people of color from all over the world. Gordon continued to espouse both of these ideas through her life.

In 1900, at 14 years old, Gordon married Robert Holt, a bricklayer who was 30 years her senior. The reason behind the arrangement of this marriage is unknown; however, there has been speculation that it was due to an economic need. Holt died in 1906, and to financially support her family, Gordon began to work as a dressmaker.

== Career ==
Gordon relocated from the south to East St. Louis, Illinois, in the mid-1910s to seek better job opportunities. In 1917, she and her family were caught in the East St. Louis riots in which white mobs killed dozens of Black people. Her son, 10-year-old John Sullivan, was beaten during the riots and died several months later due to his injuries. This traumatic event formed one of the many racial violence cases that she witnessed during her life. Following her son's death, Gordon moved to Chicago, where she met her second husband, William Gordon, in 1920. It is not known how the couple met, but they both attended meetings at the Universal Negro Improvement Association (UNIA) near their home. At these meetings, Gordon expanded her knowledge of Marcus Garvey’s message about African self-reliance and nationhood.

Gordon adopted an active role as a member of the UNIA and was promoted through the ranks quickly. After a couple of years, she was assigned the 'Lady President' position of the Chicago's local UNIA group. This position consisted of supervising the women's division, although with restricted authority. The lady president reported to the male president, who often amended the women's reports and had the final word when making decisions. Gordon's role in the organisation ended when she was a delegate to the 1929 UNIA convention in Jamaica—two years after Garvey was deported—where she experienced male opposition towards her authority.

In 1927, she opened a small restaurant on State Street in Chicago's predominantly black South Side with her husband, which sold a few delicatessen and take-away products. By 1932, it had developed into a full restaurant, but economic pressures from the Depression forced it to close in 1934. Gorgon created a group that used her restaurant as a base for political and ideological discussion, this group eventually formed into the Peace Movement of Ethiopia, which she founded in December 1932 in Chicago. She led the organisation through her active involvement in planning and facilitating the meetings. The movement advocated for repatriating African Americans to Liberia because it would be cheaper to establish African Americans in West Africa than to provide them welfare in America. Her Peace Movement sent a petition with over 400,000 signatures to President Roosevelt in 1933. The petition was diverted to the State Department, and from there it was diverted to the Division of Western European Affairs, where it stagnated.

Due to her affiliation with Japanese politicians and Japanese members of the Pacific Movement of the Eastern World, as well as the Black Dragon Society in the early 1940s, the Federal Bureau of Investigation put her under surveillance. In October 1942, she was arrested for sedition and seditious conspiracy after making statements praising Japan, which an enemy nation of the United States during World War II. Among Gordon's statements were:

- That on December 7, 1941, one billion Black people struck for freedom
- That the Japanese were going to redeem the Negroes from the white men in this country
- That the spoils of the United States would be equally divided among Hitler and the Japanese
- That it is impossible for America and Britain to win this war
- That great numbers of American ships were being sunk by U-boats, whose crews are glad to see these ships leave the shore with full cargoes
- That the United States government was claiming to have sunk more ships than they really had

In 1943, Gordon was found guilty and sentenced to two years in prison. The FBI also arrested her husband and two other Peace Movement of Ethiopia authorities, who were all charged with the crimes of conspiracy and sedition.

=== Relationship with white supremacists ===
Gordon was keen to pass the Greater Liberia Bill to "advance black emigration to Liberia." This bill proposed buying land in Africa from England and France and situating African Americans there who would be emigrating from the United States. These immigrants would also be given land grants and financial help to encourage them to move to Liberia. To achieve her goal, Gordon had to forge relationships with white supremacists in positions of power. Earnest Sevier Cox was one of these figures and, despite being on the opposite side of the political spectrum, he supported Gordon's goal and the bill in general. Their motivations were vastly different: Cox wanted the deportation of African Americans from the US because he saw them as inferior, whereas Gordon wanted improved social conditions for her fellow Black people. Cox's interest in the bill led to Gordon contacting him by letter and persuading him to help support her cause. In the end, Cox was unable to get the bill passed. Still, he did manage to get the Virginia General Assembly to pass a resolution that urged US Congress to give federal assistance to African Americans who wanted to migrate.

Upon realizing that Cox alone would not be able to help her achieve her goal, Gordon turned to another white supremacist who was in an even higher position of authority: US senator Theodore G. Bilbo who, like Cox, wanted African Americans to be deported or be racially segregated in America. Bilbo had been a proponent of the idea of deportation before the Greater Liberia bill's existence and was, therefore, the perfect 'ally' for Gordon. She even referred to Bilbo as 'Moses' who led her and her organisation, the Peace Movement of Ethiopia, through the senate. However, she only did this to encourage him to pass the legislation that she so desperately wanted. When it became apparent in the senate that the Greater Liberia bill was unpopular and was criticised for its logistical problems, Gordon and Bilbo's relationship deteriorated quickly. Following the failure of the Greater Liberia bill, Gordon went on a tirade in the media, lambasting Bilbo and white America in general. She criticised the nation for its racial injustices and highlighted that white people would one day pay for their forefather's sins in the form of an African American President.

== Death ==
Gordon died of heart failure on June 16, 1961, at 71 years old. However, her death certificate stated that she was ten years younger than her actual age when she died, because her third husband, Moses Gibson, was unable to provide a few key details about her life. Another reason was that in the city of her birth, she was registered as unknown.

Gordon's nephew (the son of her older brother Clarence Allen Nelson) was the musician John Lewis Nelson. Her grandnephew, John Lewis Nelson's son, was the musician Prince.
