= Sally Stapleton =

American journalist

Sally Stapleton (born November 23, 1957) is an American photojournalist.

== Early life ==
Stapleton was born in Kennett, Missouri. Her father was the publisher of the local newspaper, the Daily Dunklin Democrat. Stapleton is a member of Delta Delta Delta sorority, initiated at Delta Xi chapter, University of Missouri in 1977. She was a 2002 Fulbright Scholar.

== Career ==
For over ten years she worked for the Associated Press, resigning in December 2003 from the position of executive photo editor. She was responsible for leading the teams of photographers that covered Princess Diana's funeral, the September 11 attacks, the 1994 Rwandan genocide and the 1998 United States embassy bombings. For the latter two events, she led a team of AP photojournalists who won a Pulitzer prize for their work.

In 2008, Stapleton assumed the role of Assistant Managing Editor overseeing online, photo and graphics operations for The Day newspaper in New London, Connecticut. In 2010, Stapleton was named managing editor for online and photography at The Day. She joined the Pittsburgh Post-Gazette in October 2016 and eight months later was named managing editor. The staff of the Post-Gazette won the 2019 Pulitzer Prize for Breaking News Reporting for its coverage of the Pittsburgh synagogue shooting which killed 11.
