= Louis Otey =

American baritone singer (born 1954)

Louis Otey (born 22 November 1954) is an American baritone singer born in South Dakota. He performed at the Royal Opera House Covent Garden, Metropolitan Opera, San Francisco Opera and other major international companies.

He is notable for his performances in operas by Gian Carlo Menotti: he has performed in The Consul in the Teatro Verdi in Trieste, Italy, and at the Edinburgh Festival, the role of Donato in Maria Golovin for the Greek National Opera and the Spoleto Festival USA, three male roles in La Loca for the Spoleto Festival, Abdul in The Last Savage, and Martín Zapater in the world premiere of Goya at the Kennedy Center.

Otey is co-founder and Artistic Director of the Phoenicia International Festival of the Voice.
