= Bragg City, Missouri =

- City
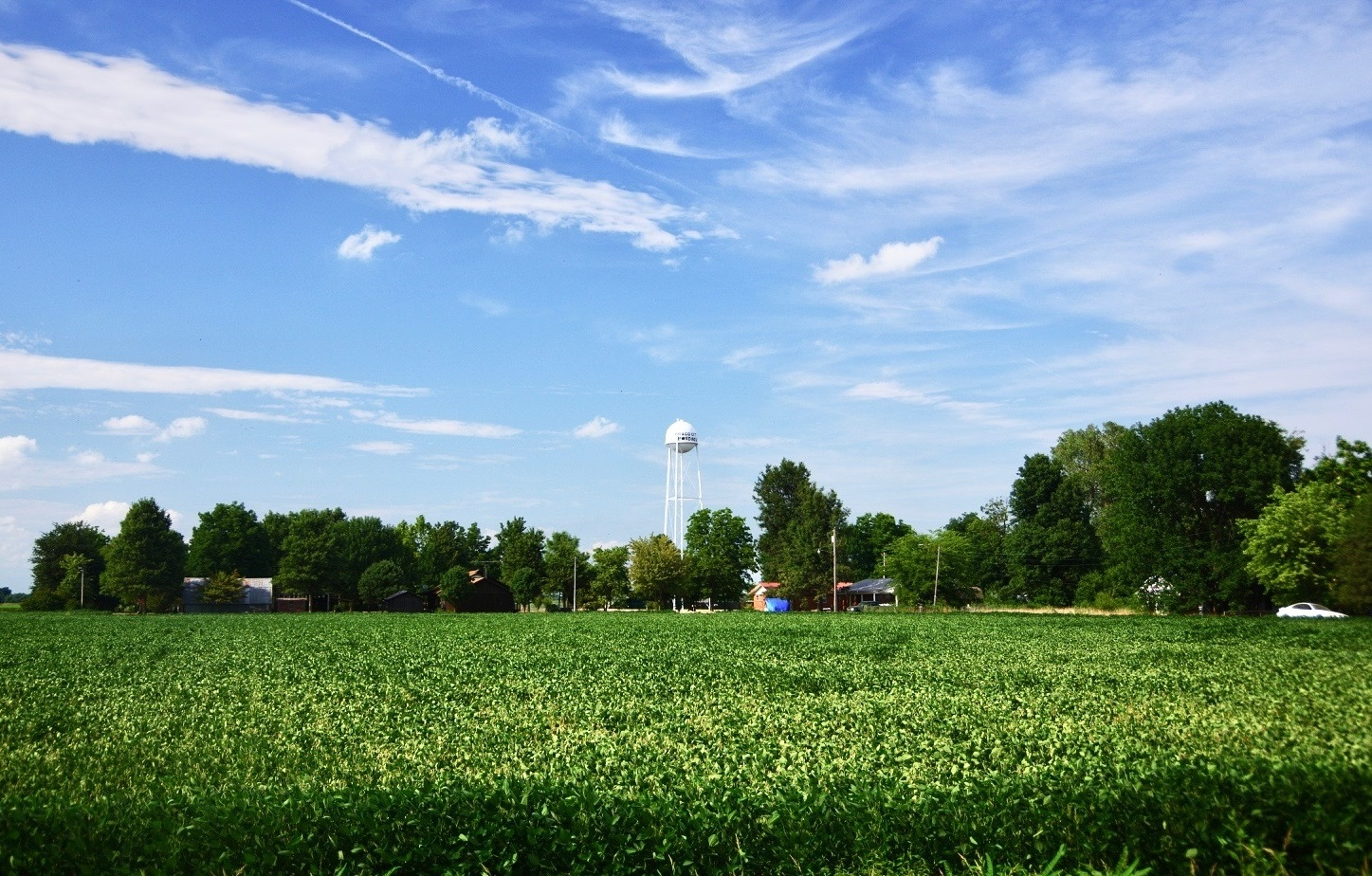
- Bragg City

- Location of Bragg City, Missouri
- Coordinates: 36°16′05″N 89°54′41″W
- Country: United States
- State: Missouri
- County: Pemiscot

Area
  - Total: 0.20 sq mi (0.53 km^{2})
  - Land: 0.20 sq mi (0.53 km^{2})
  - Water: 0 sq mi (0.00 km^{2})
- Elevation: 259 ft (79 m)

Population (2020)
  - Total: 72
  - Density: 352.3/sq mi (136.04/km^{2})
- Time zone: UTC-6 (Central (CST))
  - Summer (DST): UTC-5 (CDT)
- ZIP code: 63827
- Area code: 573
- FIPS code: 29-07876
- GNIS feature ID: 2396600

Bragg City is a city in Pemiscot County, Missouri, United States. The population was 72 at the 2020 census.

== History ==
Bragg City was originally named Owl City, and under the latter name was laid out in 1894 when the railroad was extended to that point. Another early variant name was "Clayroot". A post office called Clayroot was established in 1911, and the name was changed to Bragg City in 1917. The present name honors W. G. Bragg, the original owner of the site.

== Geography ==
Bragg City is situated in western Pemiscot County, northeast of Kennett. State Route K traverses Bragg City, connecting it with Pascola to the east. State Route A runs through the northwestern part of Bragg City, connecting it with Wardell to the northeast and U.S. Route 412 to the southwest.

According to the United States Census Bureau, the city has a total area of 0.20 square miles (0.52 km^{2}), all land.

== Demographics ==
Historical population
Census	Pop.	Note	%±
1920	402		—
1930	205		−49.0%
1940	318		55.1%
1950	294		−7.5%
1960	274		−6.8%
1970	210		−23.4%
1980	200		−4.8%
1990	117		−41.5%
2000	189		61.5%
2010	149		−21.2%
2020	72		−51.7%
U.S. Decennial Census

=== 2010 census ===
At the 2010 census, there were 149 people, 53 households, and 32 families living in the city. The population density was 745.0 per square mile (287.6/km^{2}). There were 61 housing units at an average density of 305.0 per square mile (117.8/km^{2}). The racial makeup of the city was 87.92% White, 4.03% Black or African American, 2.01% Native American, 3.36% Asian, and 2.68% from two or more races. Hispanic or Latino of any race were 0.67% of the population.

There were 53 households, of which 35.8% had children under the age of 18 living with them, 35.8% were married couples living together, 17.0% had a female householder with no husband present, 7.5% had a male householder with no wife present, and 39.6% were non-families. 35.8% of all households were made up of individuals, and 11.4% had someone living alone who was 65 years of age or older. The average household size was 2.81 and the average family size was 3.59.

The median age was 35.8 years. 32.2% of residents were under the age of 18; 4.8% were between the ages of 18 and 24; 26.2% were from 25 to 44; 24.8% were from 45 to 64; and 12.1% were 65 years of age or older. The gender makeup of the city was 51.0% male and 49.0% female.

=== 2000 census ===
At the 2000 census, there were 189 people, 69 households and 56 families living in the town. The population density was 923.5 inhabitants per square mile (356.6/km^{2}). There were 76 housing units at an average density of 371.3 per square mile (143.4/km^{2}). The racial makeup of the town was 91.01% White, 5.29% African American, 1.06% Native American, 0.53% from other races, and 2.12% from two or more races. Hispanic or Latino of any race were 3.70% of the population.

There were 69 households, of which 42.0% had children under the age of 18 living with them, 55.1% were married couples living together, 17.4% had a female householder with no husband present, and 17.4% were non-families. 17.4% of all households were made up of individuals, and 10.1% had someone living alone who was 65 years of age or older. The average household size was 2.74 and the average family size was 3.00.

28.6% of the population were under the age of 18, 10.1% from 18 to 24, 32.8% from 25 to 44, 15.3% from 45 to 64, and 13.2% who were 65 years of age or older. The median age was 34 years. For every 100 females there were 103.2 males. For every 100 females age 18 and over, there were 98.5 males.

The median household income was $26,042 and the median family income was $26,042. Males had a median income of $28,750 females $17,917. The per capita income was $12,214. About 20.5% of families and 18.8% of the population were below the poverty line, including 27.7% of those under the age of eighteen and 15.8% of those 65 or over.

== Education ==
It is in Kennett School District 39.

Three Rivers College's service area includes Pemiscot County.
