= Kennett Sound Studios =

Missouri Recording Studio

Coordinates: 36°13′31″N 90°03′43″W

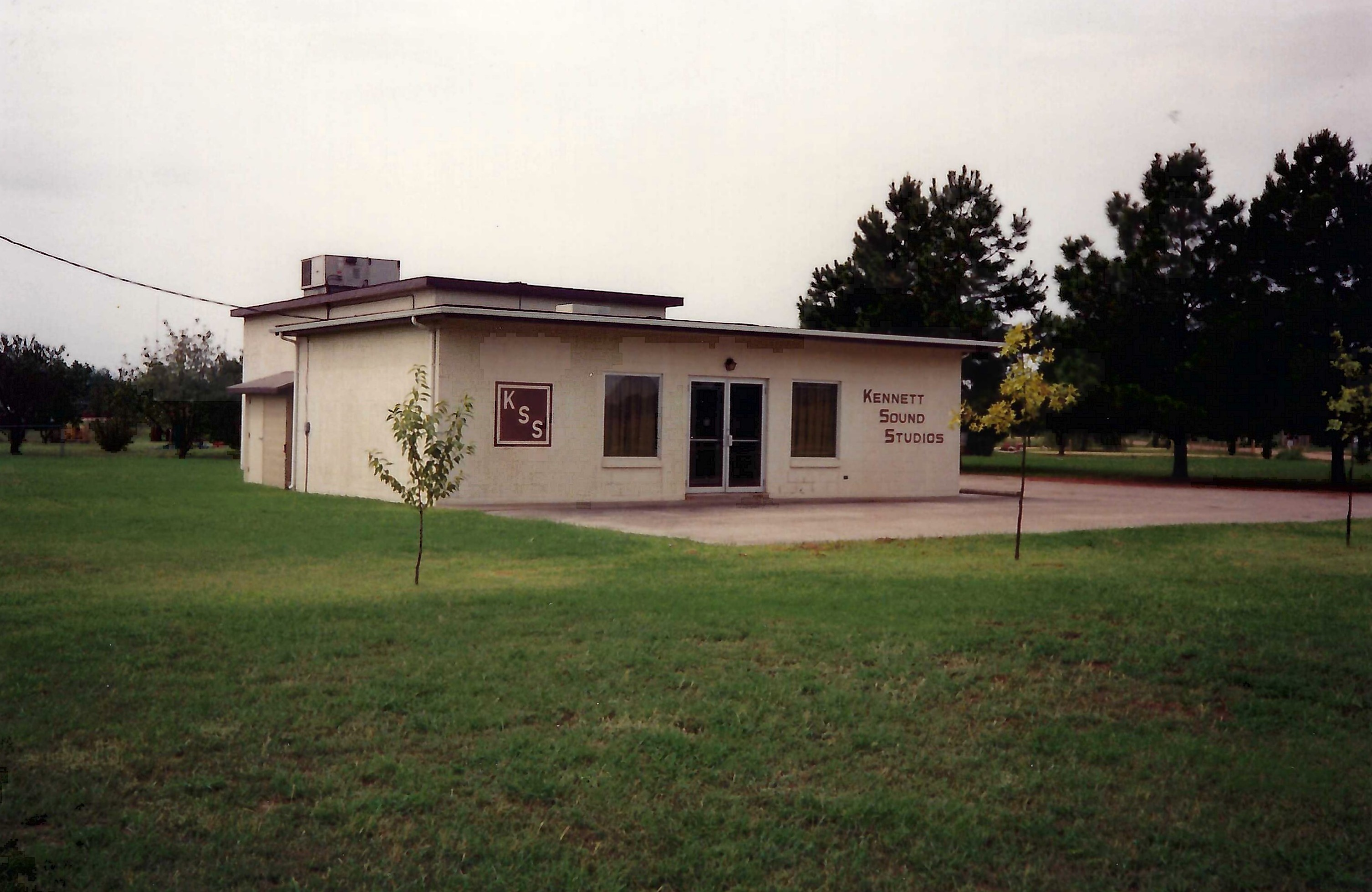
- Kennett Sound Studios in 1971
- Founded: 1967
- Founder: Joe Keene
- Genre: Gospel, Rock
- Country of origin: United States
- Location: Kennett, Missouri, U.S.

Kennett Sound Studios (KSS) was a music recording studio located in Kennett, Missouri. Hundreds of artists from 11 states and five foreign countries journeyed to the Missouri Bootheel to record country, gospel (Black and Southern), and rock music at KSS. Such artists include nationally and internationally known Sheryl Crow, Stephen Ackles, Veda Brown, Narvel Felts, David Nail, Billy Lee Riley, John Wesley Ryles, Trent Tomlinson, and others.

In 1967, KSS was founded and operated by recording engineer, producer, disc jockey, record producer, songwriter, and Missouri musician Joe Eugene Keene. By 1971 it was incorporated with businessmen Kent Sexton and Fred Rigdon joining Keene to expand the recording facilities. The studio building was completed in November of 1971 at 2000 South Bypass.

KSS closed in 1997 when the building was sold and a historical marker was erected in 2022 at the original site.
