= Ethiopianism =

Ethiopianism may refer to:

- Ethiopian studies, the western academic study of Ethiopian history and culture
- The Ethiopian movement, a social movement that began in Southern Africa in the late 19th and early 20th century
- The Ethiopian nationalism, political parlance of civic nationalism in Ethiopia
- Peace Movement of Ethiopia, back-to-Africa organization
- Ethiopian World Federation, intergovernmental organization
