= Kennett School District 39 =

School district in Missouri, U.S.

Address
- 510 College Avenue Kennett, Missouri, 63857; United States

District information
- Type: Public
- Grades: PreK–12
- NCES District ID: 2916500

Students and staff
- Students: 1,985
- Teachers: 141.87
- Staff: 110.39
- Student–teacher ratio: 13.99

Other information
- Website: www.kennett.k12.mo.us

Kennett School District #39 is a school district headquartered in Kennett, Missouri.

The district, partly in Dunklin County, covers the majority of the municipality of Kennett. The district extends into Pemiscot County, where it includes Bragg City.

== Schools ==
- Kennett High School
- Kennett Middle School
- Masterson Elementary School
- South Elementary School
- Early Childhood Center
- Kennett Career & Technology Center
