= North Wardell, Missouri =

Former village in Pemiscot County, Missouri, United States

- Former village
- Location of North Wardell, Missouri
- Coordinates: 36°21′34″N 89°48′58″W
- Country: United States
- State: Missouri
- County: Pemiscot

Area
  - Total: 0.077 sq mi (0.2 km^{2})
  - Land: 0.077 sq mi (0.2 km^{2})
  - Water: 0 sq mi (0.0 km^{2})
- Elevation: 272 ft (83 m)

Population (2000)
  - Total: 170
  - Density: 1,784/sq mi (688.8/km^{2})
- Time zone: UTC-6 (Central (CST))
  - Summer (DST): UTC-5 (CDT)
- FIPS code: 29-53354
- GNIS feature ID: 0723505

North Wardell was a village in Pemiscot County, Missouri, United States. The population was 170 at the 2000 census.

== History ==
North Wardell was annexed by Wardell in 2007.

== Geography ==
According to the United States Census Bureau, the village has a total area of 0.1 square mile (0.3 km^{2}), all land.

== Demographics ==
As of the census of 2000, there were 170 people, 67 households, and 45 families residing in the village. The population density was 1,784.0 inhabitants per square mile (688.8/km^{2}). There were 79 housing units at an average density of 829.0 per square mile (320.1/km^{2}). The racial makeup of the village was 98.82% White and 1.18% Native American.

There were 67 households, out of which 34.3% had children under the age of 18 living with them, 53.7% were married couples living together, 11.9% had a female householder with no husband present, and 32.8% were non-families. 32.8% of all households were made up of individuals, and 22.4% had someone living alone who was 65 years of age or older. The average household size was 2.54 and the average family size was 3.24.

In the village, the population was spread out, with 27.6% under the age of 18, 11.2% from 18 to 24, 26.5% from 25 to 44, 18.8% from 45 to 64, and 15.9% who were 65 years of age or older. The median age was 31 years. For every 100 females, there were 93.2 males. For every 100 females age 18 and over, there were 92.2 males.

The median income for a household in the village was $27,692, and the median income for a family was $29,861. Males had a median income of $28,750 versus $22,500 for females. The per capita income for the village was $13,172. About 8.6% of families and 16.4% of the population were below the poverty line, including 28.6% of those under the age of eighteen and 17.2% of those 65 or over.

== See also ==
- List of cities in Missouri
