= Peace Movement of Ethiopia =

The Peace Movement of Ethiopia was an African-American organization based in Chicago, Illinois. It was active in the 1930s and 1940s, and promoted the repatriation of African Americans to the African continent, especially Liberia. They were affiliated with the Black Dragon Society.

== History ==
The organization was founded in December 1932 in Chicago, Illinois. They met at 4653 South State Street. In the 1930s and 1940s, it had more than 300,000 members.

Its founder and president was Mittie Maud Gordon. She was a former member of the Universal Negro Improvement Association and African Communities League, and a supporter of Marcus Garvey.

The organization advocated the repatriation of African-Americans to Africa. As early as 1933, they petitioned President Franklin D. Roosevelt to repatriate them, arguing that the cost would be lesser than the "charity" they received in the United States to survive. A year later, in 1934, they started working with Methodist preacher Earnest Sevier Cox, the author of White America, also a proponent of repatriation, and Senator Theodore Bilbo. In 1938, two members of the organization, David Logan and Joseph Rockmore, went to Liberia for a month. There, they met Thomas J. R. Faulkner of the People's Party, who had run for President (and lost) in 1927. They also contacted Edwin Barclay, who served as the 18th President of Liberia from 1930 until 1944. However, he responded that he did not think the United States government would pay for their journey. In order to make it harder for them to emigrate, he added that they must be worth at least US$1,000 upon arriving in Liberia.

The organization supported Senator Bilbo's Greater Liberia Bill of 1939. The organization's President Gordon called him their "Great White Father" for his sponsor of the bill. After Senator's death in 1947, with the Universal African National Movement, another pro-repatriation African-American organization based in New York City, they asked Senators Strom Thurmond, John C. Stennis of Mississippi and Richard Russell, Jr. of Georgia to propose pro-colonization bills. They declined, retorting that some of their constituents, who were still plantation owners, needed the workforce, and the bill would contradict their belief in states's rights, as it would require federal funding for the journey.

== Black Dragon Society ==
The Peace Movement of Ethiopia was considered by the FBI to be an "unwitting front" for the Black Dragon Society. Most of the PME's funds came from the Japanese consuls general in New York and San Francisco. By 1938, the PME was supposedly being run by Satokata Takahashi.

== Seditious activity ==
In 1942, Gordon, president general of the Peace Movement of Ethiopia was jailed along with other religious leaders. The raid, which occurred in October 1942, also included members of two other pro-Japanese African-American organizations: the Brotherhood of Liberty for the Black Man of America and the Temple of Islam. It also included members from the World Wide Friends of Africa. Gordon said she had four million followers, and they were all taught that they are citizens of Liberia, and therefore are not subject to Selective Service.

When the organization dissolved, many members joined the Nation of Islam, another African-American organization.

== See also ==
- Pacific Movement of the Eastern World
