= Pearl Sherrod =

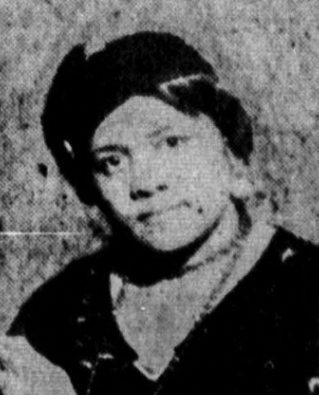
- Sherrod in 1934
- Born: Pearl T. Barnett; 1896; Alabama, U.S.
- Died: Unknown
- Occupation: Activist
- Spouses: James Sherrod (divorced); Satokata Takahashi (m. 1934)

Pearl T. Sherrod (born Pearl T. Barnett; 1896 – year of death unknown), was an African American activist known for her advocacy for Black and Asian solidarity during the 1930s. Her involvement in Detroit-based organizations such as Nation of Islam (NOI) and The Development of our Own (TDOO) shaped her interest in promoting Black internationalist feminism through social justice work. She served as a leader of TDOO and was a journalist for the Detroit Tribune, advocating for civil rights, challenging racial inequality, and providing a voice for marginalized communities. Sherrod's landmark address at the 1937 Pan-Pacific Women’s Association conference highlighted racial violence in the United States and called for global Afro-Asian alliances against oppression.

== Early life ==
Born in 1896 in Alabama, Pearl T. Barnett spent the majority of her adolescence in West Virginia. While records are scarce, it appears Sherrod only attended school through the fourth grade. She married James Sherrod, a man from Georgia, at the age of 15. The couple had three children: Vernell Sarah Sherrod, born in 1910; Emerson Sherrod, born in 1913; and Jimmilee Sherrod, born in 1914. Based on census records, Sherrod worked as a laundress during the 1920s in Clarksburg, Virginia. Sherrod and two of her children moved to Detroit, Michigan, between the years of 1927 and 1929. Their move coincided with the Great Migration, in which Black families moved to the North and Midwest in search of better job opportunities. In Detroit, Sherrod continued her career as a laundress. By the late 1920s, Sherrod and her husband separated, and she became a single parent, taking full custody of her two sons.

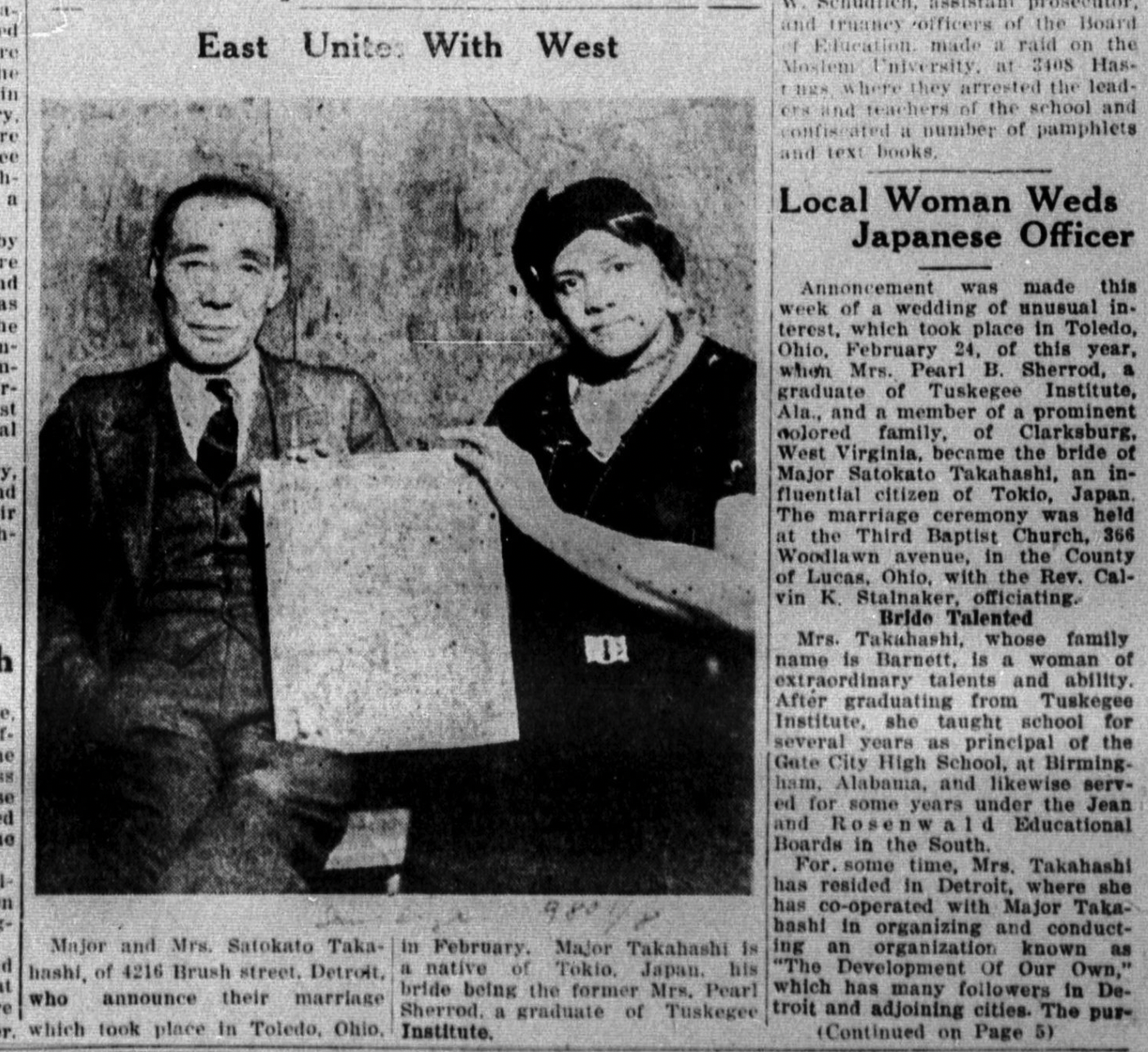
Clipping of Detroit's Tribune Independent newspaper featuring Pearl T. Sherrod and Satokata Takahashi's marriage.

Sherrod’s experiences while living in Detroit played a pivotal role in the formation of her interest in Black internationalist feminism and activism. In the 1930s, she became involved with the Nation of Islam (NOI) when its founder, Wallace D. Fard, began spreading his teachings in the Black community of Detroit. Fard encouraged a unique form of Islam and urged followers to reject the traditional classifications of race, an idea that later influenced Sherrod’s beliefs on the necessity of racial unity in the third world. Sherrod joined the NOI because she believed the organization could improve her and her family’s social conditions. After the NOI was taken over by Elijah Muhammad, who took more patriarchal stances on organizational leadership, Sherrod left the group.

On February 24, 1934, Sherrod remarried to Satokata Takahashi, a Japanese immigrant. Takahashi was an activist who worked in Black communities to further Afro-Asian solidarity. Their interracial marriage has been speculated to be partly political to give Takahashi’s activist career increased reputability.

== Activism ==
=== Development of Our Own ===
After her stint in the Nation of Islam, Pearl Sherrod became involved in The Development of Our Own (TDOO), a Detroit-based organization whose stated mission consisted of furthering Black and Asian unity. Founded by George Grimes, TDOO advanced the solidarity of working-class men and women of color under the acknowledgement of their shared experiences of racial and economic oppression, which the group attributed to western imperialism. The leadership of TDOO was taken over by Satokata Takahashi, Sherrod’s husband, who continued to push pro-Japanese sentiment in largely Black neighborhoods. Takahashi was supportive of female involvement in TDOO and recognized the necessity of their work as secretaries, organizers, and recruiters. The organization experienced rapid growth in this time. Sherrod held a leadership position in the TDOO, a rarity for Black women during the time period. After Takahashi was deported to Japan in April 1934 for immigration violations, Sherrod took over TDOO. Sherrod continued the organization’s work, but with a greater emphasis on Black internationalist feminism, in which she viewed Afro-Asian solidarity as a fundamental component. Sherrod saw the collective uplifting of minorities in third-world nations throughout Asia, Africa, and Latin America as an integral method of fighting what she deemed the dominant White social order. She spoke out against White supremacy in the United States and promoted racial unity through a column in the Detroit Tribune Independent. In her writing, she took a special interest in fighting against lynchings and false accusations of African American men. Sherrod encouraged increasing Black female leadership in TDOO. As part of her activism, Sherrod wrote letters to other Black activists, including Mittie Maude Lena Gordon, throughout the Midwest in order to strengthen the ties of TDOO, although the success of this campaign is unclear.

=== Pan-Pacific Women's Association (PPWA) ===
Sherrod attended the 1937 Pan-Pacific Women’s Association conference held in Vancouver, British Columbia, and was the first African American woman to speak at a PPWA meeting. The Pan-Pacific Women’s Association (PPWA) was an international women’s organization founded in Honolulu in 1930. The group promoted cross-cultural exchange primarily between different Asian ethnicities, hosting conferences around the world. Sherrod was not originally scheduled to serve as a public speaker at the conference, but was given the opportunity to deliver an address after her arrival. Her speech denounced the proliferation of global White supremacy and shed light on the challenges faced by individuals of African descent in the United States and across the African diaspora, highlighting their plight and advocating for greater awareness and support. In particular, Sherrod spoke out against the recent lynching of a Black man in the American South. Sherrod urged the global White community to grant constitutional rights to those of darker racial groups, appealing for equitable treatment and recognition of their fundamental rights. Her objective was to build Afro-Asian alliances and work towards dismantling the oppression of people of color, regardless of their ethnic differences.

She stated:

"Now I am appealing to you international women, to let us join hand and heart together and find the cause of the broken peace which is injustice and discrimination, and let us kill the germ of it... There can never be peace on the Pacific or Atlantic until justice is given to all mankind”.

According to historical records, Sherrod exaggerated the scope and impact of The Development of Our Own (TDOO) at the conference. This amplification aimed to bolster her credibility among the female activists of the PPWA. For instance, she portrayed TDOO as being spearheaded by Black women, although the leadership roles were almost exclusively held by men, with the sole exception being a female recording secretary. Additionally, Sherrod omitted any reference to her husband, Takahashi, positioning herself as one of the founders of TDOO, although she was not involved in the founding of the organization. Likewise, she claimed that the number of members was as high as 230,000, but existing records indicate that the actual number was around 10,000.

Nevertheless, prior to her involvement, none of the thirty official U.S. representatives at the 1937 conference were Black, and previous conferences had not addressed African American concerns, so her participation marked a notable change in PPWA’s objectives. She used her presence to raise awareness of the South’s racial violence against Black communities.

== Later life ==
Sherrod’s personal life was turbulent in later years, marked by a public argument with her husband concerning organization leadership and her subsequent dismissal from her leadership role in TDOO. Although Sherrod continued to advocate for Japan's military and political triumph, which she viewed as a means of achieving liberty for Black Americans, in 1945 she took a step back from public activism. After severing ties with her husband and TDOO, Sherrod returned to a more private life in Detroit with her youngest son, Emerson Sherrod. In a 1940 census, Pearl Sherrod reported being widowed and unemployed, only receiving financial assistance from her second son, Jimmilee, who was employed as a WPA construction worker. Her last recorded appearance indicated that she spent most of her retirement in Idlewild, Michigan. Her date of death is unknown.
