= Wardell, Missouri =

City in Pemiscot County, Missouri, United States

- City
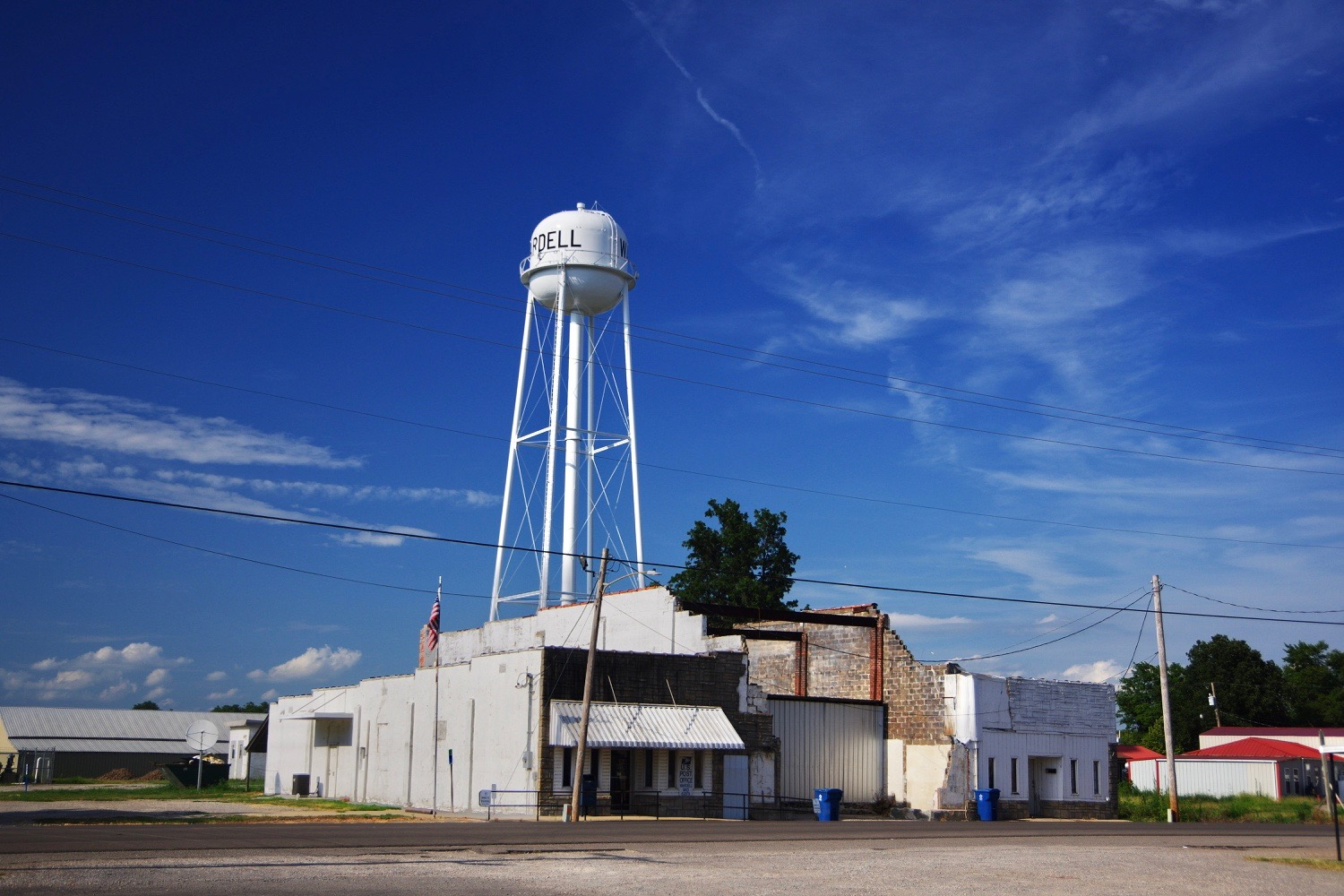
- Wardell Post Office and water tower, July 2018

- Location of Wardell, Missouri
- Coordinates: 36°21′14″N 89°49′01″W
- Country: United States
- State: Missouri
- County: Pemiscot

Area
  - Total: 0.29 sq mi (0.74 km^{2})
  - Land: 0.28 sq mi (0.73 km^{2})
  - Water: 0.0039 sq mi (0.01 km^{2})
- Elevation: 269 ft (82 m)

Population (2020)
  - Total: 310
  - Density: 1,097.5/sq mi (423.75/km^{2})
- Time zone: UTC-6 (Central (CST))
  - Summer (DST): UTC-5 (CDT)
- ZIP code: 63879
- Area code: 573
- FIPS code: 29-76966
- GNIS feature ID: 2397722

Wardell is a city in Pemiscot County, Missouri, United States. The population was 310 at the 2020 census.

== History ==
A post office called Wardell has been in operation since 1902. The community's name is derived from the last name of R. L. Warren, an early citizen, and a dell near the original town site. In 2007 the city of Wardell annexed the former village of North Wardell.

== Geography ==
The city lies in northern Pemiscot County at the intersection of State Route A and State Route B. The former road connects Wardell with Bragg City to the southwest and Interstate 55 to the east, while the latter road connects Wardell with Homestown and Pascola to the south. Little River flows through the city.

According to the United States Census Bureau, the city has a total area of 0.28 square miles (0.73 km^{2}), all land.

== Demographics ==
Historical population
Census	Pop.	Note	%±
1930	272		—
1940	430		58.1%
1950	454		5.6%
1960	331		−27.1%
1970	275		−16.9%
1980	299		8.7%
1990	325		8.7%
2000	278		−14.5%
2010	427		53.6%
2020	310		−27.4%
U.S. Decennial Census

=== 2010 census ===
As of the census of 2010, there were 427 people, 172 households, and 123 families living in the city. The population density was 1,525.0 inhabitants per square mile (588.8/km^{2}). There were 195 housing units at an average density of 696.4 per square mile (268.9/km^{2}). The racial makeup of the city was 95.32% White, 3.51% Black or African American, 0.23% Native American, and 0.94% from two or more races. Hispanic or Latino of any race were 0.70% of the population.

There were 172 households, of which 37.8% had children under the age of 18 living with them, 42.4% were married couples living together, 20.9% had a female householder with no husband present, 8.1% had a male householder with no wife present, and 28.5% were non-families. 27.9% of all households were made up of individuals, and 11.1% had someone living alone who was 65 years of age or older. The average household size was 2.48 and the average family size was 2.97.

The median age in the city was 37.6 years. 27.9% of residents were under the age of 18; 8.4% were between the ages of 18 and 24; 23.7% were from 25 to 44; 25.6% were from 45 to 64; and 14.5% were 65 years of age or older. The gender makeup of the city was 48.9% male and 51.1% female.

=== 2000 census ===
As of the census of 2000, there were 278 people, 110 households, and 77 families living in the town. The population density was 1,423.3 inhabitants per square mile (549.5/km^{2}). There were 119 housing units at an average density of 609.3 per square mile (235.3/km^{2}). The racial makeup of the town was 93.53% White, 4.32% African American, 2.16% from other races. Hispanic or Latino of any race were 2.16% of the population.

There were 110 households, out of which 33.6% had children under the age of 18 living with them, 48.2% were married couples living together, 18.2% had a female householder with no husband present, and 29.1% were non-families. 26.4% of all households were made up of individuals, and 15.5% had someone living alone who was 65 years of age or older. The average household size was 2.53 and the average family size was 3.01.

In the town the population was spread out, with 27.3% under the age of 18, 11.2% from 18 to 24, 21.9% from 25 to 44, 24.5% from 45 to 64, and 15.1% who were 65 years of age or older. The median age was 37 years. For every 100 females there were 90.4 males. For every 100 females age 18 and over, there were 82.0 males.

The median income for a household in the town was $20,208, and the median income for a family was $25,357. Males had a median income of $27,083 versus $15,000 for females. The per capita income for the town was $9,829. About 14.3% of families and 22.0% of the population were below the poverty line, including 29.8% of those under the age of eighteen and 20.5% of those 65 or over.

== Education ==
It is in the North Pemiscot County R-I School District.

Three Rivers College's service area includes Pemiscot County.

== Notable people ==
- Bill Burlison, politician
- Jeff Stone, professional baseball player
