= Kennett, Missouri =

City in Missouri, U.S.

- City
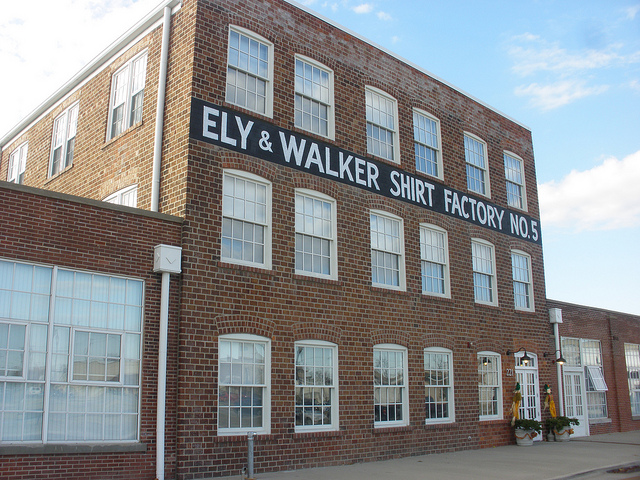
- Ely & Walker Shirt Factory 5 on Main Street

- Location of Kennett, Missouri
- Coordinates: 36°14′25″N 90°02′53″W
- Country: United States
- State: Missouri
- County: Dunklin

Government
  - Mayor: Jake Crafton

Area
  - Total: 7.00 sq mi (18.14 km^{2})
  - Land: 7.00 sq mi (18.14 km^{2})
  - Water: 0.0039 sq mi (0.01 km^{2})
- Elevation: 272 ft (83 m)

Population (2020)
  - Total: 10,515
  - Density: 1,501.7/sq mi (579.82/km^{2})
- Time zone: UTC-6 (Central (CST))
  - Summer (DST): UTC-5 (CDT)
- ZIP code: 63857
- Area code: 573
- FIPS code: 29-38306
- GNIS feature ID: 2395508
- Website: cityofkennettmo.com

Kennett is a city in and the county seat of Dunklin County, Missouri, United States. The city is located in the southeast corner (or "Bootheel") of Missouri, 4 miles (6.4 km) east of Arkansas and 20 miles (32 km) from the Mississippi River. It had a population of 10,515 at the 2020 census. Kennett is the largest city in the Bootheel, a mostly agricultural area.

== History ==
Settlers built log cabins in the area in the first half of the 19th century, naming their settlement Chilletecaux in honor of a Delaware Indian chief who lived there. The town was renamed Butler in the late 1840s. Due to mail delivery problems because of other jurisdictions named the same, the settlement was renamed Kennett, in honor of the mayor of the city of St. Louis, Luther M. Kennett.

In the 1890s, a railroad reached the area, stimulating growth in the town. In that same period, the state began construction of a massive drainage program in the St. Francis River basin, which was floodplain and wetlands. In the 20th century, after timber clearing, the area was developed for cultivation of cotton and other commodity crops.

On March 15, 2025, an EF2 tornado hit the city at EF1 strength, damaging several homes, businesses, a motel, and wooden power poles and snapping trees.

In May 2025, Kennett was in national news for local reactions to deportation in the second presidency of Donald Trump when a legal resident of twenty years, Carol Mayorga, was detained by ICE.

== Demographics ==
Historical population
Census	Pop.	Note	%±
1880	171		—
1890	302		76.6%
1900	1,509		399.7%
1910	3,033		101.0%
1920	3,622		19.4%
1930	4,128		14.0%
1940	6,335		53.5%
1950	8,685		37.1%
1960	9,098		4.8%
1970	10,090		10.9%
1980	10,145		0.5%
1990	10,941		7.8%
2000	11,260		2.9%
2010	10,932		−2.9%
2020	10,515		−3.8%
U.S. Decennial Census

The Kennett Micropolitan Statistical Area consists of Dunklin County.

=== 2020 census ===
As of the 2020 census, Kennett had a population of 10,515, with 4,233 households and 2,662 families. The population density was 1,502.1 per square mile (579.7/km^{2}).

98.4% of residents lived in urban areas, while 1.6% lived in rural areas.

There were 4,793 housing units, of which 11.7% were vacant. The homeowner vacancy rate was 3.0% and the rental vacancy rate was 8.1%.

Of the 4,233 households, 30.8% had children under the age of 18 living in them. Of all households, 35.2% were married-couple households, 19.9% were households with a male householder and no spouse or partner present, and 37.4% were households with a female householder and no spouse or partner present. About 34.0% of all households were made up of individuals, and 14.3% had someone living alone who was 65 years of age or older. The average household size was 2.2 and the average family size was 2.8.

The median age was 38.7 years. 26.3% of residents were under the age of 18 and 18.6% were 65 years of age or older. For every 100 females, there were 90.3 males, and for every 100 females age 18 and over, there were 85.3 males.

Racial composition as of the 2020 census
Race	Number	Percent
White	7,494	71.3%
Black or African American	1,941	18.5%
American Indian and Alaska Native	21	0.2%
Asian	63	0.6%
Native Hawaiian and Other Pacific Islander	1	0.0%
Some other race	274	2.6%
Two or more races	721	6.9%
Hispanic or Latino (of any race)	611	5.8%

=== Income and poverty ===
The 2016–2020 5-year American Community Survey estimates show that the median household income was $40,857 (with a margin of error of +/- $9,064) and the median family income was $55,915 (+/- $4,916). Males had a median income of $33,403 (+/- $12,178) versus $22,135 (+/- $2,919) for females. The median income for those above 16 years old was $25,639 (+/- $2,302). Approximately, 12.4% of families and 23.0% of the population were below the poverty line, including 31.1% of those under the age of 18 and 8.8% of those ages 65 or over.

As of 2000 the median household income was $26,088 and the median family income was $34,167. Males had a median income of $29,958 versus $18,770 for females. The per capita income for the city was $14,397. Living below the poverty line were 26.1% of the population and 20.5% of families. Those living below the poverty line were 37.5% of those under the age of 18 and 24.0% of those 65 and older.

=== 2010 census ===
As of the census of 2010, there were 10,932 people, 4,377 households, and 2,849 families residing in the city. The population density was 1,570.7 inhabitants per square mile (606.5/km^{2}). There were 4,863 housing units at an average density of 698.7 per square mile (269.8/km^{2}). The racial makeup of the city was 80.1% White, 16.2% African American, 0.2% Native American, 0.6% Asian, 0.1% Pacific Islander, 1.3% from other races, and 1.7% from two or more races. Hispanic or Latino of any race were 3.5% of the population.

There were 4,377 households, of which 32.6% had children under the age of 18 living with them, 42.5% were married couples living together, 18.1% had a female householder with no husband present, 4.5% had a male householder with no wife present, and 34.9% were non-families. 30.2% of all households were made up of individuals, and 12.4% had someone living alone who was 65 years of age or older. The average household size was 2.41 and the average family size was 2.95.

The median age in the city was 38.4 years. 25.5% of residents were under the age of 18; 8.8% were between the ages of 18 and 24; 23.7% were from 25 to 44; 25.5% were from 45 to 64; and 16.5% were 65 years of age or older. The gender makeup of the city was 47.1% male and 52.9% female.

== Geography ==
Kennett is located at 36°14′25″N 90°02′53″W (36.2403403, -90.0480886). According to the United States Census Bureau, the city has a total area of 6.96 square miles (18.03 km^{2}), all land.

As part of the southern extremity of Missouri, Kennett has a humid subtropical climate (Köppen climate classification Cfa) with cool winters and hot, humid summers, ample precipitation through much of the year, and is part of USDA Plant Hardiness Zone 7b. The monthly daily average temperature ranges from 35.3 °F (1.8 °C) in January to 80.7 °F (27.1 °C) in July. On average, there are 4.9 days annually with 100 °F (38 °C)+ highs, 63 days of 90 °F (32 °C)+ highs, 9.4 days where the temperature does not rise above freezing, and 4.8 days with 10 °F (−12 °C) or lower minima.

=== Climate ===
Climate data for Kennett, Missouri
Month	Jan	Feb	Mar	Apr	May	Jun	Jul	Aug	Sep	Oct	Nov	Dec	Year
Mean daily maximum °F (°C)	44.9 (7.2)	50.2 (10.1)	60.4 (15.8)	71.3 (21.8)	80.1 (26.7)	88.9 (31.6)	91.6 (33.1)	91.5 (33.1)	84.5 (29.2)	73.6 (23.1)	59.9 (15.5)	47.5 (8.6)	70.4 (21.3)
Mean daily minimum °F (°C)	25.8 (−3.4)	29.5 (−1.4)	37.9 (3.3)	47.9 (8.8)	57.8 (14.3)	66.5 (19.2)	69.8 (21.0)	67.7 (19.8)	59.1 (15.1)	47.1 (8.4)	38.3 (3.5)	28.9 (−1.7)	48.0 (8.9)
Average precipitation inches (mm)	3.67 (93)	4.04 (103)	4.54 (115)	4.87 (124)	5.49 (139)	3.53 (90)	3.57 (91)	2.32 (59)	3.32 (84)	4.49 (114)	4.40 (112)	4.90 (124)	49.14 (1,248)
Average snowfall inches (cm)	3.1 (7.9)	2.7 (6.9)	.5 (1.3)	0 (0)	0 (0)	0 (0)	0 (0)	0 (0)	0 (0)	0 (0)	trace	.9 (2.3)	7.2 (18)
Average precipitation days (≥ 0.01 in)	7.5	8.3	9.1	9.2	9.7	7.4	7.0	5.4	6.5	7.4	8.4	8.6	94.5
Average snowy days (≥ 0.1 in)	.9	1.5	.1	0	0	0	0	0	0	0	0	.6	3.1
Source: NOAA

== Government ==
Kennett is located in Missouri's 8th congressional district in southeastern Missouri and is the county seat of Dunklin County, Missouri.

The city of Kennett is governed by a city council with 10 elected city council members with the mayor acting as the presiding officer.

Mayor	Took office	Left office	Additional information
Theophilus Robb			c. 1917–1918
Paul Caruthers Jones (1901–1981)	1933	1935	U.S. Representative, Missouri senator, Missouri state representative
John Warren Karsten (1887–1964)	c. 1943	1951	
Lee A. Pickard Sr. (1892–1974)	1951	1951	
John Warren Karsten (1887–1964)	1952	1952	(He previously served as mayor.)
Lee A. Pickard Sr. (1892–1974)	1953	1954	(He previously served as mayor.)
Arthur Oscar Billington (1911–1985)	1955	1963	
Sol Astrachan (1929–2022)	1963	1971	Born in the Free City of Danzig. He was responsible for paving the streets and implementing zoning ordinances.
Harry E. Goddard (1907–1980)	1971	1975	
John Warren Karsten Jr. (1922–1994)	1975	c. 1991	He served in the U.S. Army Air Corps during World War II.
Charles B. Brown (1940–2020)	c. 1991	c. 1999	
Donald Parker			c. 2005–2006
Roger Wheeler Sr.			c. 2008–2011
Jake Crafton	2011	2015	He previously served as a councilman for 4 years.
Bob Hancock	2015	2019	He previously served as mayor pro-tem and councilman.
Chancellor P. Wayne, DC	2019	2023	Chiropractor
Jake Crafton	2023		(He previously served as mayor.)

== Education ==
Kennett School District 39 covers the majority of the municipality. The Kennett district operates six public schools in Kennett. The pre-school is called Kennett Early Learning Center. The elementary schools are South Elementary School and H. Byron Masterson Elementary School. The other schools are Kennett Middle School, Kennett High School, and Kennett Career and Technical Center. Kennett High School's baseball team won the class 4 state championship in 2021.

Small sections of Kennett extend into Holcomb R-III School District and Senath-Hornersville C-8 School District.

Kennett Christian Academy is a co-ed, private school affiliated with the First United Pentecostal Church that opened in 1979 and offers elementary through high school classes.

Kennett is home to two higher education branch institutions. Southeast Missouri State University at Kennett is a branch of the Cape Girardeau main campus and Three Rivers College (Missouri) is a branch of the Poplar Bluff main campus.

Kennett has a public library, the Dunklin County Library.

== Media ==
The Delta Dunklin Democrat serves as the area's local newspaper.

== Transportation ==
Kennett Memorial Airport is a city-owned, public-use airport located one nautical mile (1.85 km) southeast of the central business district of Kennett.

== Notable people ==
- Frank Bare Sr., Hall of Fame gymnastics administrator
- Sheryl Crow, Grammy-winning singer/songwriter
- John M. Dalton, former Missouri governor
- Gene Handley, professional baseball player
- Will Johnson, singer/songwriter and member of band Monsters of Folk
- Paul C. Jones, former congressman from Missouri
- Dan Landrum, hammered dulcimer player who tours with Yanni
- Fred Lasswell, cartoonist of Barney Google and Snuffy Smith
- Kennett Sound Studios, recording studio founded by Joe Keene
- David Nail, country music recording artist
- Limmie Pulliam, opera singer
- Gib Singleton, sculptor, Fulbright Scholar
- Sally Stapleton, Pulitzer-winning photojournalist
- Jeff Stone, former left fielder for the Philadelphia Phillies
- Trent Tomlinson, country singer
- Orville Zimmerman, United States Representative for Missouri's 10th congressional district, was a member of Kennett's board of education, 1928–1936

== See also ==
- List of municipalities in Missouri
