= Pascola, Missouri =

- Village
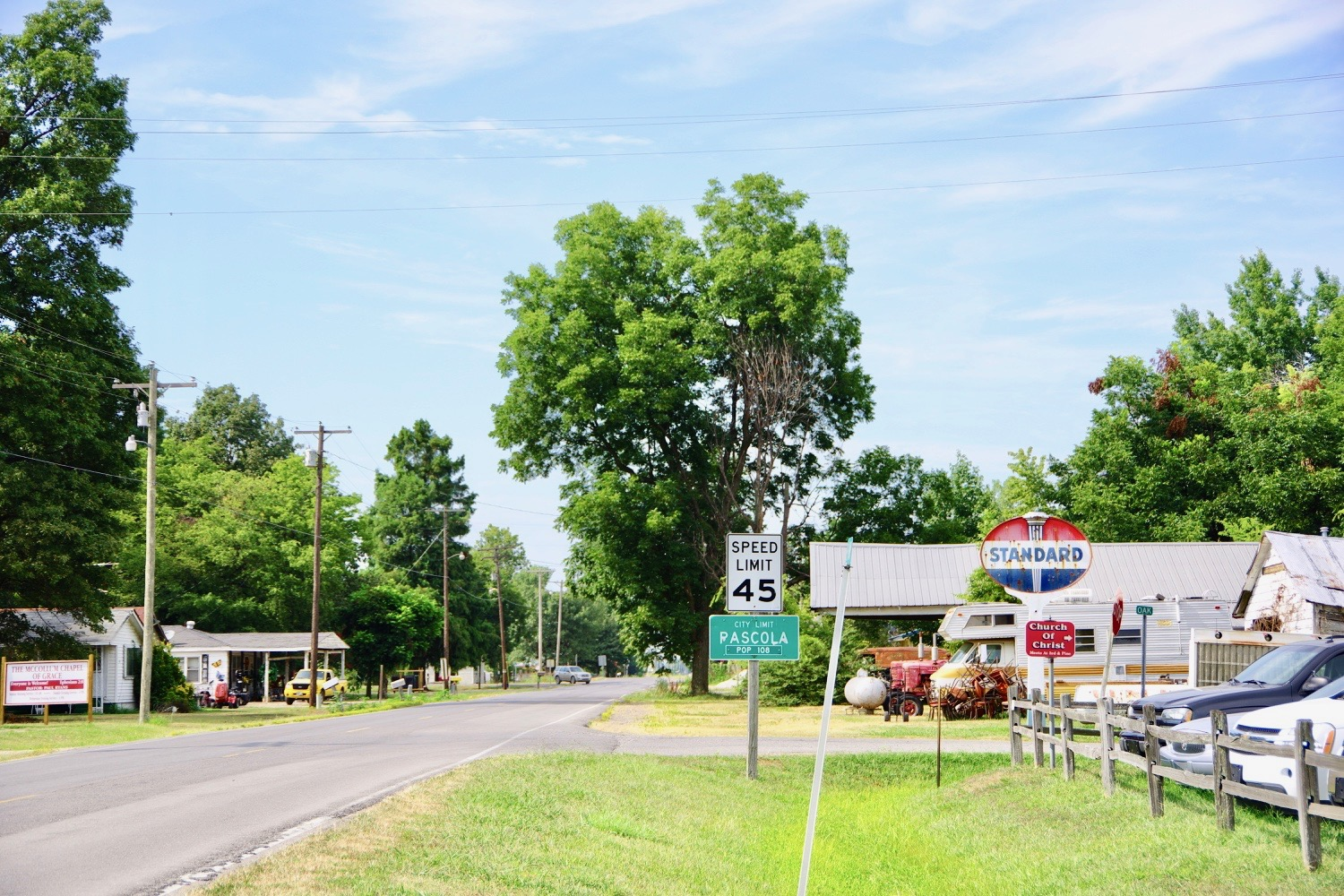
- State Highway B entering Pascola

- Location of Pascola, Missouri
- Coordinates: 36°16′02″N 89°49′33″W
- Country: United States
- State: Missouri
- County: Pemiscot

Area
  - Total: 0.16 sq mi (0.41 km^{2})
  - Land: 0.16 sq mi (0.41 km^{2})
  - Water: 0 sq mi (0.00 km^{2})
- Elevation: 266 ft (81 m)

Population (2020)
  - Total: 87
  - Density: 544/sq mi (210.2/km^{2})
- Time zone: UTC-6 (Central (CST))
  - Summer (DST): UTC-5 (CDT)
- ZIP code: 63871
- Area code: 573
- FIPS code: 29-56432
- GNIS feature ID: 2399629

Pascola is a village in Pemiscot County, Missouri, United States. The population was 87 at the 2020 census.

== History ==
Pascola was platted in 1894 when the railroad was extended to that point. It is unclear why the name "Pascola" was applied to this community. The Pascola post office closed in 1992.

== Geography ==
Pascola lies northwest of Hayti at the intersection of State Route B and County State Route K. The former road connects Pascola to Homestown and Wardell to the north and U.S. Route 412 to the south, and the latter connects the village with Bragg City to the west.

According to the United States Census Bureau, the village has a total area of 0.16 square miles (0.41 km^{2}), all land.

== Demographics ==
Historical population
Census	Pop.	Note	%±
1920	441		—
1930	262		−40.6%
1940	345		31.7%
1950	242		−29.9%
1960	228		−5.8%
1970	180		−21.1%
1980	211		17.2%
1990	120		−43.1%
2000	138		15.0%
2010	108		−21.7%
2020	87		−19.4%
U.S. Decennial Census

=== 2010 census ===
As of the census of 2010, there were 108 people, 48 households, and 26 families living in the village. The population density was 675.0 inhabitants per square mile (260.6/km^{2}). There were 55 housing units at an average density of 343.8 per square mile (132.7/km^{2}). The racial makeup of the village was 97.22% White, 0.93% from other races, and 1.85% from two or more races. Hispanic or Latino of any race were 0.93% of the population.

There were 48 households, of which 25.0% had children under the age of 18 living with them, 35.4% were married couples living together, 12.5% had a female householder with no husband present, 6.3% had a male householder with no wife present, and 45.8% were non-families. 29.2% of all households were made up of individuals, and 14.6% had someone living alone who was 65 years of age or older. The average household size was 2.25 and the average family size was 2.69.

The median age in the village was 43 years. 17.6% of residents were under the age of 18; 9.3% were between the ages of 18 and 24; 26% were from 25 to 44; 27.8% were from 45 to 64; and 19.4% were 65 years of age or older. The gender makeup of the village was 45.4% male and 54.6% female.

=== 2000 census ===
As of the census of 2000, there were 138 people, 60 households, and 37 families living in the village. The population density was 576.3 inhabitants per square mile (222.5/km^{2}). There were 66 housing units at an average density of 275.6 per square mile (106.4/km^{2}). The racial makeup of the village was 97.83% White, and 2.17% from two or more races. Hispanic or Latino of any race were 0.72% of the population.

There were 60 households, out of which 21.7% had children under the age of 18 living with them, 46.7% were married couples living together, 8.3% had a female householder with no husband present, and 38.3% were non-families. 30.0% of all households were made up of individuals, and 11.7% had someone living alone who was 65 years of age or older. The average household size was 2.30 and the average family size was 2.84.

In the village, the population was spread out, with 20.3% under the age of 18, 6.5% from 18 to 24, 29.7% from 25 to 44, 21.0% from 45 to 64, and 22.5% who were 65 years of age or older. The median age was 42 years. For every 100 females, there were 109.1 males. For every 100 females age 18 and over, there were 103.7 males.

The median income for a household in the village was $18,438, and the median income for a family was $19,792. Males had a median income of $18,250 versus $21,875 for females. The per capita income for the village was $14,229. There were 12.1% of families and 22.8% of the population living below the poverty line, including none under 18 and 26.3% of those over 64.

== Education ==
It is in the North Pemiscot County R-I School District.

Three Rivers College's service area includes Pemiscot County.
