= Limmie Pulliam =

American tenor (1976–2026)

- Born: January 10, 1976; Kennett, Missouri, U.S.
- Died: May 19, 2026 (aged 50)
- Occupation: Opera singer (tenor)

Limmie Demetrus Pulliam (January 10, 1976 – May 19, 2026) was an American tenor. He was known for his powerful voice and in overcoming an industry bias against his weight.

== Early life ==
Pulliam was born in Kennett, Missouri on January 10, 1976, to Limmie D. Pulliam Sr. and Virgie Mae Pulliam as the youngest in a family of ten children. Pulliam excelled in athletics in his youth, and sang in church. In middle school, his imitation of Stevie Wonder caught the attention of the choir director, who introduced him to opera. Pulliam graduated from Oberlin College in 1998.

== Career ==
Pulliam would often receive phone calls praising his voice, but demanding he lose weight as a condition for getting auditions. Frustrated, he quit singing in his early 20s, instead taking on jobs as a debt collector and security guard. In 2007, at the age of 31, he was working as an organizer in Missouri for Barack Obama's 2008 presidential campaign. After last-minute scheduling changes, he was asked to sing the national anthem, which he did during several events "at the lowest key he could". He noticed how his voice had changed after his hiatus from singing, and it encouraged him to return to opera five years later at the age of 36, taking part in a vocal competition organized by the National Opera Association. He sang at the Metropolitan Opera for the first time in December 2022, and at Carnegie Hall on January 20, 2023.

== Death ==
Pulliam died on May 19, 2026, at the age of 50. He was survived by his mother, four sisters and four brothers.

== Discography ==
=== Studio albums ===
Title	Album details
Witness	Released: September 13, 2023; Label: Self-released (Pulliam Music Group); Format: CD, digital download, streaming
