= E. U. Essien-Udom =

Nigerian-born American academic (1928–2002)

Professor Essien Udosen Essien-Udom (October 25, 1928 – May 27, 2002) was a Nigerian-American academic. He was born in Ikot Osong, Eastern Provinces, Nigeria (now Akwa Ibom State), the first son of Timothy and Adiaha Essien. He was educated in the local primary school and Holy Family College, Abak, Eastern Nigeria; Oberlin College, Oberlin, Ohio (1951–55); and the University of Chicago (1955–61).

He was a primary school teacher (1949) and later interpreter for the Eastern Provinces of Nigeria (1949–51) before receiving a Fulbright Travel Grant for undergraduate study in the United States. On completion of his studies in political science and international relations, he taught and held administrative offices in various universities: teaching assistant and research associate, Harvard University, Cambridge, Massachusetts (1960–62); visiting lecturer, University of Vermont, Burlington, Vermont (summer 1962); assistant professor, Brown University, Providence, Rhode Island, (fall 1962); lecturer/senior lecturer, University of Ibadan, where he became professor (1965–88), head of department (1965–72), and dean of the Faculty of the Social Sciences (1966–68); Cadbury Visiting Professorial Fellow, University of Birmingham Center for West African Studies, Birmingham, UK (1972–73); founding vice chancellor, University of Maiduguri, Borno State, Nigeria (1975–79); visiting professor and head of department; dean, Faculty of Social Sciences and Director of the Center for Development Studies; and member of the Governing Council, all of the University of Cross River State, Uyo, Nigeria (1984–86).

With a political perspective inspired by Garveyism and Pan-Africanism, Essien-Udom (dubbed the "black power professor" by University of Ibadan students) was intensely public spirited and committed to institution building. He was involved in public service outside the university: executive secretary (1957/58) and then president (1960/61), All African Students Union of the Americas; leader of a delegation to the Pan-African Student Conference in London, 1960; non-resident tutor, Dunstan Hall, Harvard University; Master of Independence Hall, University of Ibadan (1967–72); University of Ibadan representative to the West African Examinations Council (1963–65) assistant and chief examiner in Government GCE examination (1966–69); and external examiner to universities in Nigeria and Ghana. He was Secretary to the Military government and Head of Service, South Eastern State, Nigeria (1973–75); member and chairman, National Universities Commission, Nigeria (1986–92).

He is the author of Black Nationalism: a Search for Identity in America and many journal articles and conference papers; co-editor with Amy Jacques Garvey, More Philosophy and Opinions of Marcus Garvey; general editor of the Frank Cass Africana Modern Library Series and the Ibadan University Press Political and Administrative Studies Series.

The University of Maiduguri awarded him an honorary Doctor of Letters (D. Litt.) for his service in 1986.

He is survived by his wife, Ruby; his son Nkeruwem; his brother Ikpong; his sisters Arit, Enoh and Ester; and a host of nephews, nieces, and other relatives.
