= Satokata Takahashi =

Founder of the Pacific Movement of the Eastern World

Naka Nakane
- 中根中
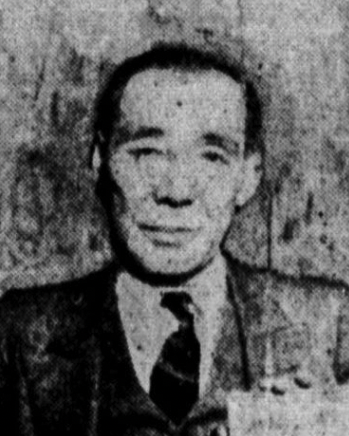
- Nakane in 1934
- Born: 1870; Kitsuki, Empire of Japan
- Died: March 2, 1954 (aged 83–84); Detroit, Michigan
- Other names: Satokata Takahashi; Satokata Takahashiin; Taka Ashe
- Education: Kwansei Gakuin University
- Organization(s): Black Dragon Society, Nation of Islam, Society for the Development of Our Own, Pacific Movement of the Eastern World
- Spouses: Annie Craddock (m. 1910) Pearl Sherrod (m. 1934)
- Partner: Cheaber McIntyre
- Children: At least 7

Naka Nakane (中根中, Nakane Naka; 1870–1954), a.k.a. Satokata Takahashi, was a Japanese-born businessman who became known as a pro-Japanese agitator among Midwestern African-Americans in the 1930s and early 1940s.

Nakane was born to a well-off family in Kitsuki and set out to become a Methodist pastor, but immigrated to Canada in 1903 following personal and professional setbacks. Settling in Moose Jaw, he raised a family, opened multiple businesses, and became an occasional advocate for Japanese Canadian rights. He moved to Tacoma, Washington in 1921 and disappeared in 1926, only to reemerge under a new name in Detroit in the early 1930s, where he became an agitator and activist in the city's black community.

Affiliated with the Black Dragon Society, he worked with leaders of the Nation of Islam and other black organizations to promote Japan as an ally of the black cause in the United States. He also founded and exercised influence over several pro-Japanese organizations, including the Pacific Movement of the Eastern World, and married black activist Pearl Sherrod. Nakane's activities attracted FBI scrutiny; he was deported in 1934 and arrested in 1939 after returning to Detroit. Following internment during World War II, he died in Detroit in 1954.

== Early life and career ==
Takahashi was born Naka Nakane in Kitsuki, Empire of Japan in 1870. He was a member of a prosperous former Samurai family, and was educated by American Methodist missionary Samuel Wainright in his youth. He attended Kwansei Gakuin University as a member of its inaugural class, and initially was a pastor, founding a church in his hometown. However, possibly due to sexual impropriety, he was expelled from the parish he founded, and became an English teacher at a junior high school. An affair with a local woman which bore two children may have contributed to his decision to immigrate to Canada in 1903.

After arriving in Victoria, he moved to Moose Jaw, then the largest city in Saskatchewan, and joined its burgeoning East Asian community. He became a naturalized British subject and married an English woman, Annie Craddock, in Saint John in 1910. They had four children while living in Canada. Nakane was listed as proprietor of Moose Jaw's Carlton Cafe in 1912 and La Hale Lodge in 1918.

In 1912, the Saskatchewan Legislature voted to forbid “any Japanese, Chinaman or other Oriental person” from employing white women. Prior to the passage of the bill, Nakane wrote a letter to Saskatchewan Attorney General William Turgeon stating that the bill's passage "would be a great dishonour to our nation in general”. Nakane's complaints to the Saskatchewan and Japanese governments are believed to have contributed to a meeting between Turgeon and Japanese consul to Vancouver, Chonosuke Yada, in turn ensuring the exemption of Japanese businessmen from the law in 1913.

In 1921, Nakane moved to Tacoma, Washington, where his brother had lived since 1911. In Tacoma, he worked as a life insurance agent and had another child with Annie. He abruptly fled in 1926, leaving behind his family and massive debts.

== Pro-Japanese activism ==
Nakane reemerged in Detroit six years after his disappearance from Tacoma under the name Satokata Takahashi. He described himself as a former Major of the Imperial Japanese Army. Nakane began making speaking appearances at black churches, writing articles in black papers, and eventually became affiliated with the Nation of Islam. He had, probably after his disappearance from Tacoma, become affiliated with the Black Dragon Society, and the society channeled financial aid to Black Muslim groups in the US through him.

He was close with early NOI member Abdul Muhammad after his arrival in Detroit, even living with him for a few weeks. He also spoke at United Negro Improvement Association (UNIA) meetings across the Midwest, sometimes posing as a Japanese consul. At one of these meetings, he met Policarpio Manansala, a.k.a. Mimo de Guzman, a Filipino immigrant who would begin a close association with Nakane. Nakane helped found the Pacific Movement of the Eastern World (PMEW) in Chicago in 1932, and The Development of Our Own (TDOO) in Detroit in 1933. Both organizations, dedicated to black-Asian unity, would eventually generate several front organizations, although their membership and mission would remain the same.

TDOO would grow to include thousands of members, mostly African Americans but including members of the small Filipino and East Asian diaspora in the Midwest. The "Five Guiding Principles" of the group were "Freedom, Justice, Equality, Liberty, and Honour." He married activist Pearl Sherrod in Toledo in February 1934, and the pair would collaborate as leaders in TDOO. While Nakane would remain instrumental in the running of TDOO and the PMEW, he would more closely manage TDOO in Detroit and the Midwest as Manansala and others attempted to expand the PMEW nationwide. TDOO would hew more closely to the "Moorish" ideology exemplified by the UNIA.

Nakane's activism in TDOO attracted the attention of the FBI, and he was deported to Japan in 1934, only to return to Canada soon after with money he claimed he had made from the sale of properties in Ōita Prefecture. For the next five years, Nakane ran TDOO from Canada with Sherrod's help. Eventually, following disputes with Sherrod, he fired her and returned to Detroit. There, he would live away from Sherrod and start an affair with a married black woman, Cheaber McIntyre. McIntyre would later claim that Takahashi reestablished his ties with the NOI at this time, even writing speeches for Elijah Muhammad. He would also reassert his involvement in the PMEW.

== Arrest, internment, and later life ==
Nakane and McIntyre were arrested by federal agents in 1939. Upon this arrest, authorities ascertained his actual identity. Having been charged with illegal entry and attempted bribery of federal officers, Nakane was fined $4,500 and sentenced to three years in federal prison.

In the early 1940s, Selective Service registrars noticed African Americans in Chicago, Detroit, and several other large cities were refusing to register under religious grounds and described themselves as Muslim. They also were not seeking an exemption as conscientious objectors. This provoked a federal reaction: in 1942, the FBI raided several Black Muslim organizations after a lengthy infiltration campaign, arresting many activists including Elijah Muhammad and Policarpo Manansala. The FBI uncovered Nakane's myriad connections with the black organizations, and arranged to keep him jailed. Interviews with Black Muslim leaders confirmed their suspicions; Elijah Muhammad claimed that he and Takahashi discussed the NOI and that Takahashi approved of his teachings, even describing him as a friend. NOI propaganda, such as a poster entitled "Calling the Four Winds", was personally designed by Nakane and McIntyre. Federal authorities eventually linked his agitation to the 1943 Detroit race riot.

Policarpo Manansala's testimony may have contributed to an overblown perception of Nakane's activism in the US. He alleged that Nakane had introduced himself to Manansala as a spy sent by Tanaka Giichi, erstwhile Prime Minister of Japan. However, no evidence has been uncovered that Nakane ever worked as an agent of the Japanese government, although his ties to (but not membership in) the Black Dragon Society are widely accepted.

Nakane was interned at FCI Leavenworth, and later, as the elderly Nakane's health failed, at the Medical Center for Federal Prisoners in Springfield, Missouri. He spent time in several Japanese Internment Camps and was paroled from Crystal City Internment Camp in 1946. He lived with Pearl Sherrod in Detroit until his death, according to the FBI, on March 2, 1954. His place of burial is unknown.
