= Babette Hierholzer =

German American pianist

Babette Hierholzer (born March 27, 1957, in Freiburg im Breisgau) is a German American pianist.

== Biography ==
Hierholzer started playing the piano at the age of five, and received her first lessons with Elisabeth Dounias-Sindermann and Wolfgang Saschowa in Berlin. At the age of eleven she made her debut at the Berlin Philharmonic Hall with Mozart's Piano Concerto KV 488. Her other teachers included Herbert Stessin, Lili Kraus, Claude Frank, Paul Badura-Skoda, Maria Tipo and Bruno Leonardo Gelber. Herbert von Karajan for whom she auditioned, invited her spontaneously to concerts with the Berlin Philharmonic Orchestra with conductors Klaus Tennstedt, Sir Colin Davis, Leopold Hager, Semyon Bychkov. Babette Hierholzer performed extensively in Europe, North and South America and Africa. Her artistic activities focused especially on the works of Robert and Clara Schumann. She played both: Clara Schumann's Piano Concerto in A minor, Op. 7 and the lesser-known concerto movement in F Minor (1847). She published Clara Wieck's 'Quatre Polonaises pour le pianoforte' op. 1 for Ries & Erler, Berlin. In 1983, Ms. Hierholzer performed the soundtrack and double/stand-in role for Clara Schumann, played by Nastassja Kinski, in Peter Schamoni’s Schumann movie 'Spring Symphony’.

In the early 1990s Hierholzer moved to the United States, where she continued her career.

In addition to her solo commitments she founded the Duo Lontano together with pianist Jürgen Appell in 2004. The two artists can look back on years of successful concertizing on extended tours to Italy, Germany, Venezuela, Mexico, Russia, Poland, and the USA. Their engagements have included an invitation to Caracas, Venezuela, to perform Mozarts 'Concerto for two pianos and orchestra in E-flat-Major' with the Orquesta Juvenil Simón Bolívar conducted by Gustavo Dudamel. In March 2016 Duo Lontano was invited to Havana, Cuba, to perform in addition to several four-hand piano recitals 'The Carnival of Animals' by Camille Saint-Saëns for two pianos and orchestra with the Orquesta Sinfónica Nacional de Cuba under Enrique Pérez Mesa. Recent concert highlights have included appearances in Würzburg (Germany), Las Palmas de Gran Canaria (Spain), White Plains (USA), and Petrópolis (Brazil). In January 2019 they gave their debut in China. Duo Lontano recorded for GENUIN Classics at the Gewandhaus in Leipzig (Germany). The first was a CD with original four-hand works, comprising the famous 'Octet' and the 'Hebrides Ouverture' by Felix Mendelssohn. A recording with works by Schubert was released early 2019. A CD with music from Latin America is in preparation.

Babette Hierholzer is the artistic director of the German Forum, Inc. in New York since 2005, an organization that has made it its mission to invite young performers from the German speaking World for debut concerts to New York. In 2014 The German Forum celebrated its 10th anniversary with a concert at the Bruno Walter Auditorium (Lincoln Center). The German Forum has presented more than 100 young instrumentalists and singers.

Since 2015, Babette Hierholzer is the new artistic director of the RCMS, Rhinebeck Chamber Music Society, in Rhinebeck, N.Y.

Babette Hierholzer is a Steinway & Sons Artist.

Babette Hierholzer lives with her husband and dog in Upstate New York.

== Recordings ==
- Hommage à Watteau: Couperin, Debussy, Schumann Marus/EMI Electrola 1985
- Robert Schumann: Exercises, Wieck-Variations f-minor, Sonata g-minor op. 22, Carnaval op. 9 Marus/EMI Electrola 1986/87
- W.A. Mozart: Piano works Marus/EMI Electrola 1989
- Franz Schubert: Sonata B-flat-major D 960 Marus/EMI Electrola 1994
- Kinderszenen with works by Robert Schumann, Clara Wieck, Alfredo Casella etc., Marus/Deutschlandradio 1997
- Domenico Scarlatti: Sonatas. Vol. I-III, Marus/EMI Electrola 1985/1991 (Vol. I and II), Marus/DeutschlandRadio Berlin 2000 (Vol. III)
- J. S. Bach: Transcriptions for piano GENUIN/Deutschlandradio Kultur 2003/2007
- Ferdinand Ries: Works for cello and piano (with Nancy Green), JRI Recordings 2005
- W. A. Mozart: Piano concerto KV 488 (with Berlin Philharmonic, conductor: Klaus Tennstedt), Testament Recordings 2010
- Felix Mendelssohn Bartholdy: Works for piano four hands (Duo Lontano), GENUIN 2015
- Schubert: Works for piano four hands (Duo Lontano), GENUIN 2019
