= Continental rōnin =

Japanese adventurers in mainland Asia

Continental rōnin (Japanese: 大陸浪人, romanized: tairiku rōnin, also translated continental adventurers) were Japanese adventurers who roamed a region centred on China from the beginning of the Meiji era to the end of World War II, engaging in various political, paramilitary and criminal activities such as espionage, banditry, and smuggling. The range of their activities was not limited to China proper, but also included Siberia, Manchuria, the Korean Peninsula, and Southeast Asia, largely overlapping with areas that were later invaded by the Japanese Army.

Continental rōnin played a large role in East Asia as agents of Japanese imperialism, causing incidents like the assassination of Queen Min, participating in conflicts such as the Siberian intervention and China's Warlord era, and laying the groundwork for the puppet state Manchukuo. Their motives and backgrounds varied, with some being ultranationalists who sought to extend Japanese influence in Asia, and others being mercenaries, ex-samurai, ideologues, opportunists, seekers of adventure or fortune, or (like Kohinata Hakurō) simply victims of circumstance. They were called rōnin because they were not part of an overarching organisation, but likened themselves to the historical rōnin and shishi.

== History ==
The first continental rōnin were Japanese merchants and disaffected ex-samurai who moved to Korea and China soon after the Seikanron theory first proposed a military invasion of mainland Asia. They quickly gained attention for their involvement in the political turmoil that marked the final years of Joseon, such as the Kapsin Coup. This group was then followed by young men who had been children or unborn during the Bakumatsu and Meiji Restoration, and thus missed the opportunity to take part in founding modern Japan. Some of them were former samurai who felt alienated after the Freedom and People's Rights Movement, the failure of the Shizoku rebellions, and the establishment of the new Meiji government led to the privileges of the samurai class being abolished. Resenting the Westernization of Japan, they embraced nationalism and Pan-Asianism and rushed into China and Korea, hoping to participate in the expansion of Japanese power into the mainland.

Using Japanese businesses in port cities as a base, these men gathered information on the local customs, politics and economy, while collaborating with nationalist secret societies in Japan like the Gen'yōsha and Black Dragon Society. In particular, Gen'yōsha founder Tōyama Mitsuru was known as one of the "two great leaders of continental rōnin" (alongside future prime minister Inukai Tsuyoshi) for his support towards them. The Japanese government, military, and businesses aligned with them like the South Manchuria Railway also began supporting a growing number of people they considered shinatsū: Japanese people with valuable expertise on the Chinese language, culture and local complexities. This financial support shaped the allegiances of later continental rōnin.

During wars like the First Sino-Japanese War and Russo-Japanese War, these shinatsū actively collaborated with the Imperial Japanese Army as interpreters, spies, saboteurs, and in special operations. As Japan's Continental Policy solidified through these wars, continental rōnin gradually became restricted to these roles. Rather than resisting this trend, they actively took part in it, seeking to assert their own relevance by steering the government, military, and public opinion towards a more hardline foreign policy.

China's divided state following the 1911 Revolution gave a new purpose to continental rōnin in Japan's Continental Policy, and led to a revival of the phenomenon. However, as China's military cliques collapsed or united and the ROC consolidated its power, the continental rōnin were unable to stand against it. The Mukden incident and Second Sino-Japanese War once again revived the phenomenon, but following Japan's defeat in World War II and the end of its foreign expansion policy, the continental rōnin essentially went extinct.

== People considered continental rōnin ==
- Oka Rokumon
- Konoe Atsumaro
- Futabatei Shimei
- Adachi Kenzō
- Kawashima Naniwa
- Tōten Miyazaki
- Ryōhei Uchida
- Chū Kudō
- Masahiko Amakasu
- Date Junnosuke
- Kohinata Hakurō
- Yoshio Kodama
- Ujitoshi Konomi

== Gallery ==
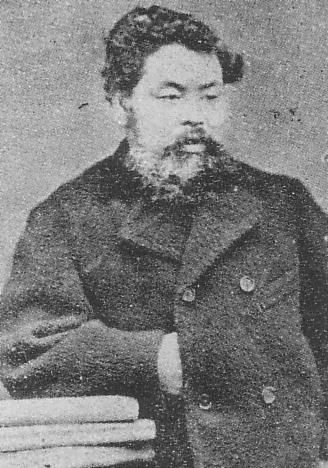
Kishida Ginko

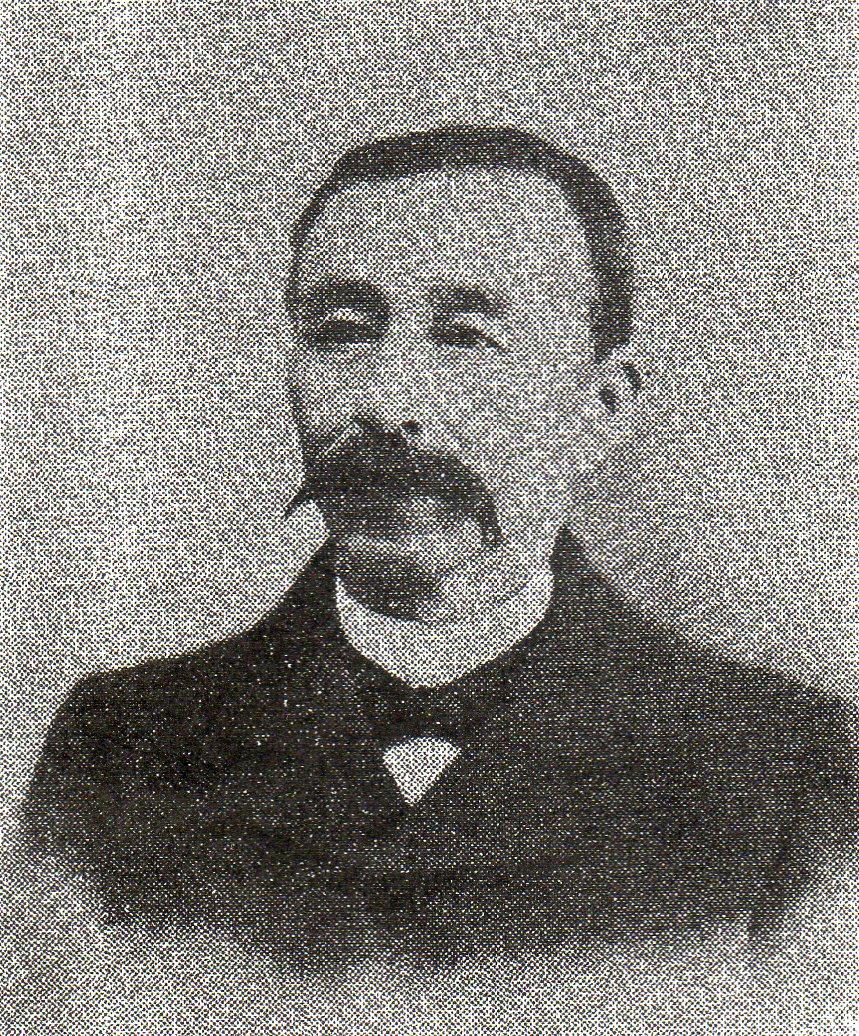
Sone Toshitora

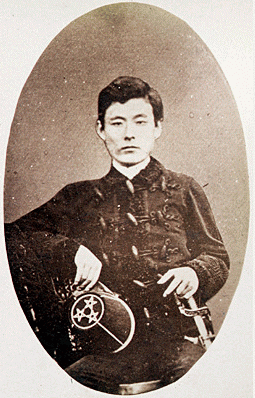
Okamoto Ryūnosuke

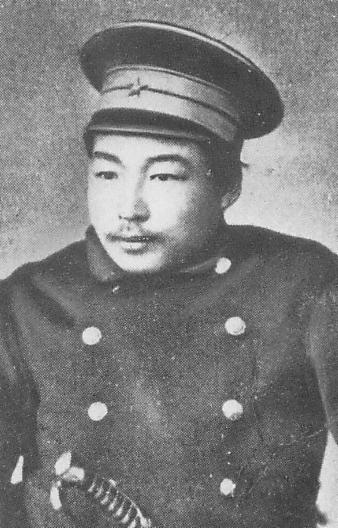
Arao Sei

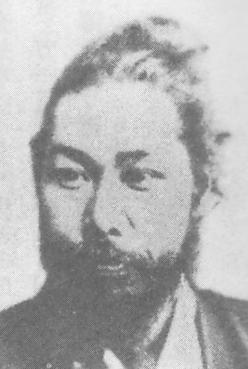
Miyazaki Tōten

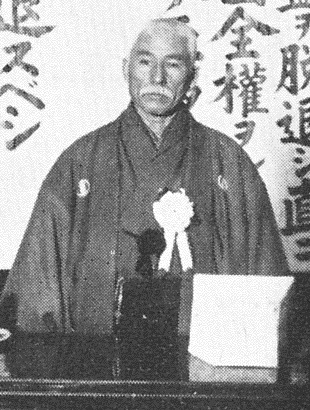
Uchida Ryōhei

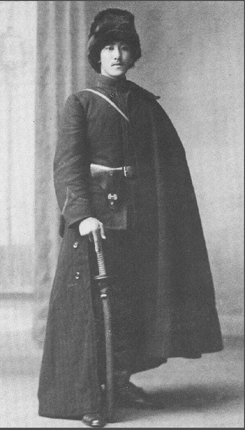
Date Junnosuke

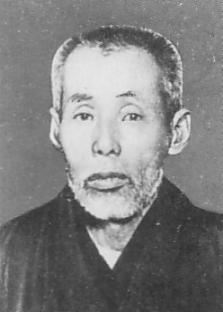
Gondō Seikyō

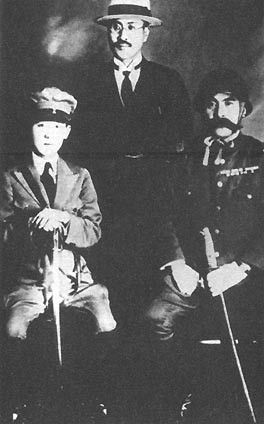
Kawashima Naniwa

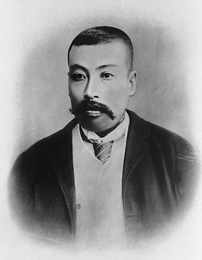
Yokokawa Shōzō

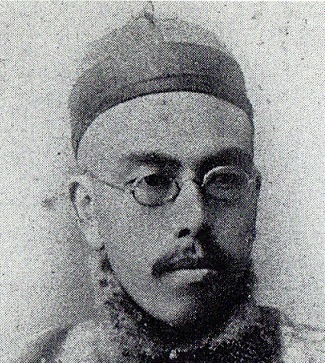
Yamada Yoshimasa
