= History of India–Japan relations =

The history of relations between the Republic of India and Japan has involved many cultural exchanges since ancient times. The two nations have been guided by common cultural traditions, including the shared heritage of Buddhism.

== Ancient era ==
=== Prehistoric contacts ===
Yayoi tombs have yielded hundreds and in some cases thousands of Indo-Pacific tube drawn glass beads originating from India and South East Asia dating from Early Yayoi (300–200 BCE), middle Yayoi (200–0 BCE) and late Yayoi (0–250 CE) indicating existence of Indian Ocean maritime contacts between Japan and South and South East Asia.

=== Historic contacts ===
India's earliest documented direct contact with Japan was with the Todai-ji Temple in Nara, where the consecration or eye-opening of the towering statue of Lord Buddha was performed by an Indian monk, Bodhisena, in 752 AD.

=== Hinduism in Japan ===
Hinduism and Shintoism incorporate animism within their core belief systems. Shintoism is theorised to have evolved from pre-historic shamanistic practices that were also found across North East Asia and may have been the most primitive intrinsic form of spiritual belief system held by humans throughout the world. Chinese dynastic histories mention the importance of designated shamans among early religious practices in Japan but not Korea. Shintoism is often thought of as having derived from the earliest animistic practices of the ancestors of Japan, the earliest type of belief system found across humanity, with strong influences from China and India in latter millennia, and "early shintoism" shares some similarities with other indigenous belief systems found in tribal communities.

In my opinion, if all our rich and educated men once go and see Japan, their eyes will be opened.

— Swami Vivekananda, The Complete Works of Swami Vivekananda/Volume 5/Conversations and Dialogues/VI – X Shri Priya Nath Sinha

Though Hinduism is a little-practiced religion in Japan, it has still had a significant, but indirect role in the formation of Japanese culture through Buddhism. One indication of this is the Japanese "Seven Gods of Fortune", of which four originated as Hindu deities: Benzaitensama (Sarasvati), Bishamon (Vaiśravaṇa or Kubera), Daikokuten (Mahākāla/Shiva), and Kichijōten (Lakshmi). Along with Benzaitennyo/Sarasvati and Kisshoutennyo/Laxmi and completing the nipponisation of the three Hindu Tridevi goddesses, the Hindu goddess Mahakali is nipponised as the Japanese goddess Daikokutennyo (大黒天女), though she is only counted among Japan's Seven Luck Deities when she is regarded as the feminine manifestation of her male counterpart Daikokuten (大黒天). Benzaiten arrived in Japan during the 6th through 8th centuries, mainly via the Chinese language translations of the Sutra of Golden Light (金光明経), which has a section devoted to her. She is also mentioned in the Lotus Sutra. In Japan, the lokapālas take the Buddhist form of the Four Heavenly Kings (四天王). The Sutra of Golden Light became one of the most important sutras in Japan because of its fundamental message, which teaches that the Four Heavenly Kings protect the ruler who governs his country in the proper manner. The Hindu god of death, Yama, is known in his Buddhist form as Enma. Garuda, the mount (vahana) of Vishnu, is known as the Karura (迦楼羅), an enormous, fire-breathing creature in Japan. It has the body of a human and the face or beak of an eagle. Tennin originated from the apsaras. The Hindu Ganesha (see Kangiten) is displayed more than Buddha in a temple in Futako Tamagawa, Tokyo. Other examples of Hindu influence on Japan include the belief of "six schools" or "six doctrines" as well as use of Yoga and pagodas. Many of the facets of Hindu culture which have influenced Japan have also influenced Chinese culture. People have written books on the worship of Hindu gods in Japan. Even today, it is claimed Japan encourages a deeper study of Hindu gods.

=== Buddhism ===
Buddhism has been practised in Japan since its official introduction in 552 CE according to the Nihon Shoki from Baekje, Korea by Buddhist monks. Buddhism has had a major influence on the development of Japanese society and remains an influential aspect of the culture to this day. Japanese Buddhism is originally derived from the Chinese cannon, with influences from the Tibetan cannon and Pali cannon.

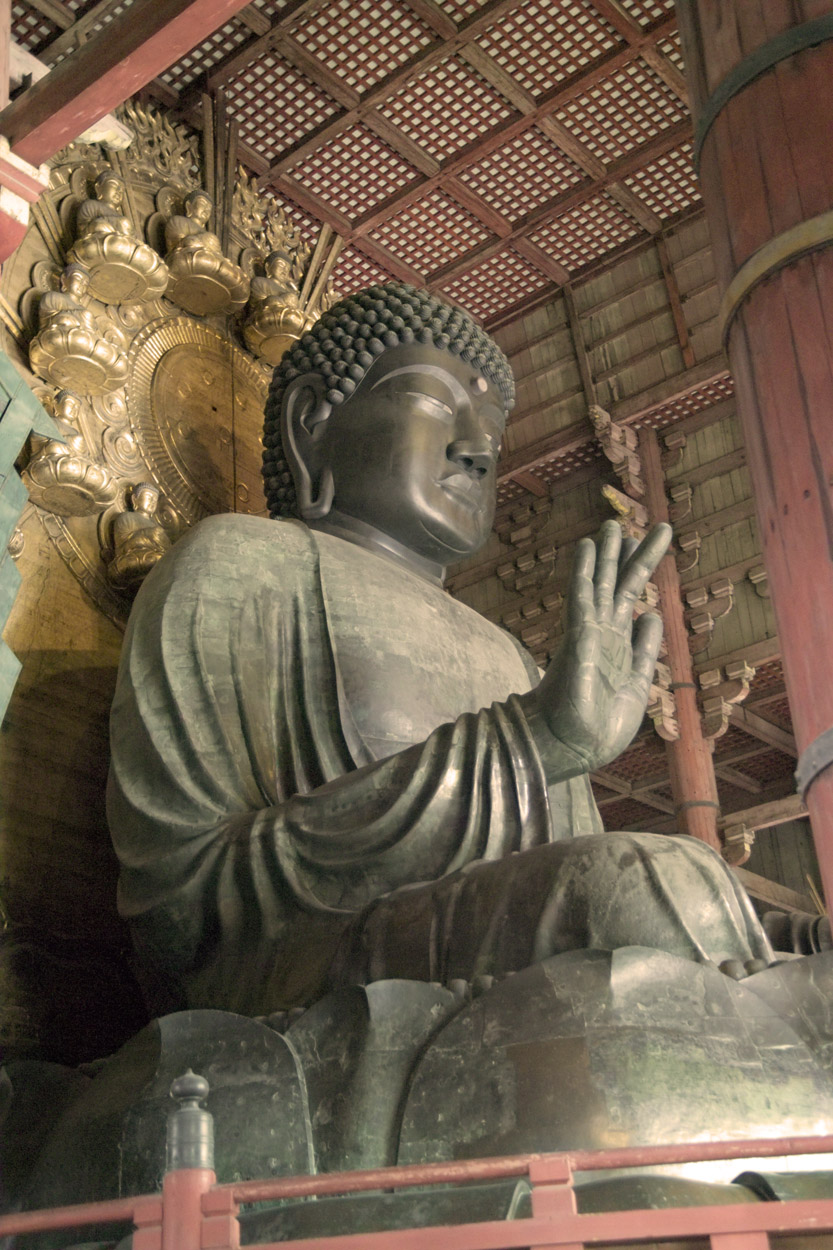
Great Buddha (Vairocana) Tōdai-ji temple, Japan.

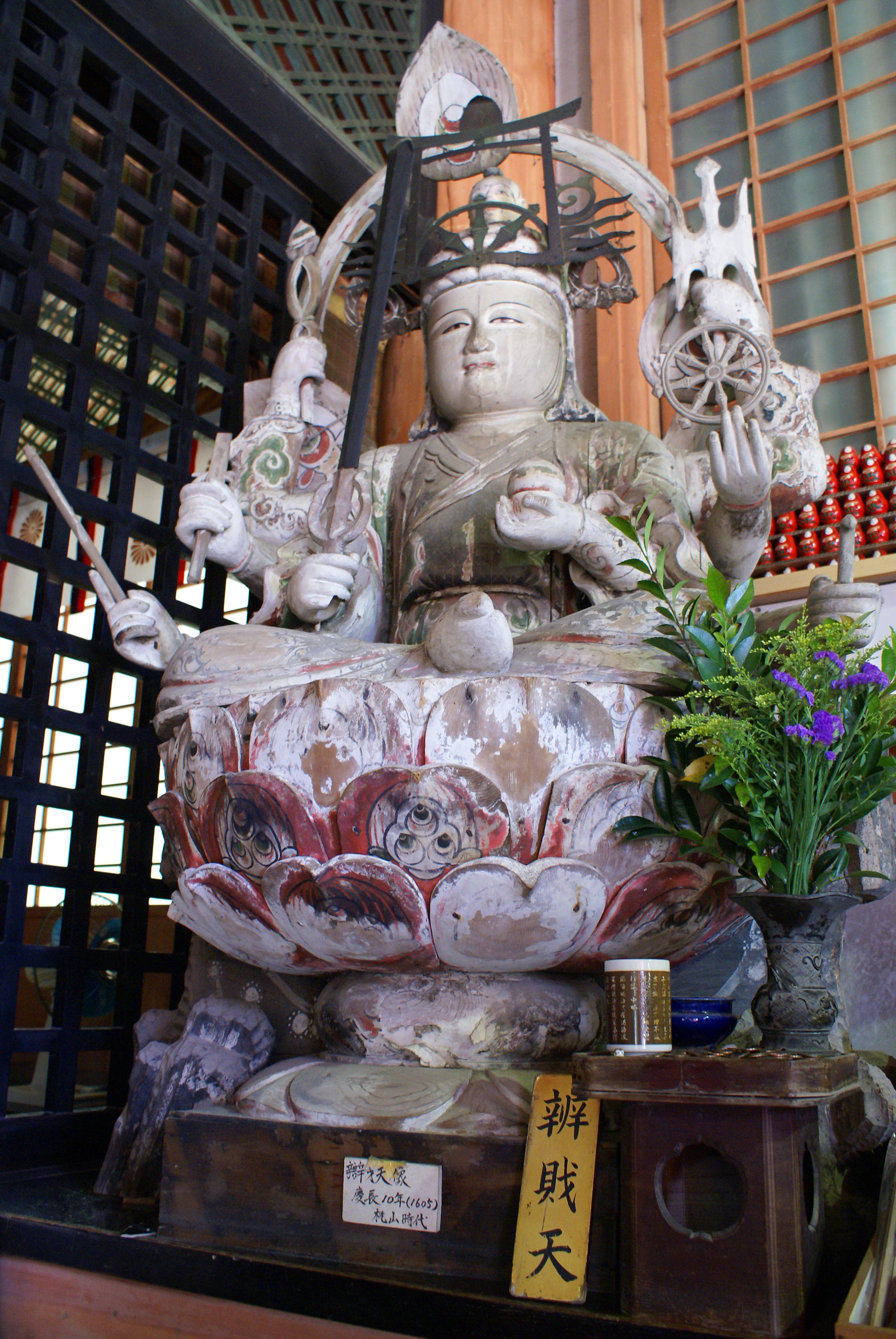
Benzaiten, one of the Seven Gods of Fortune in Japan, evolved from the Hindu deity Saraswati.

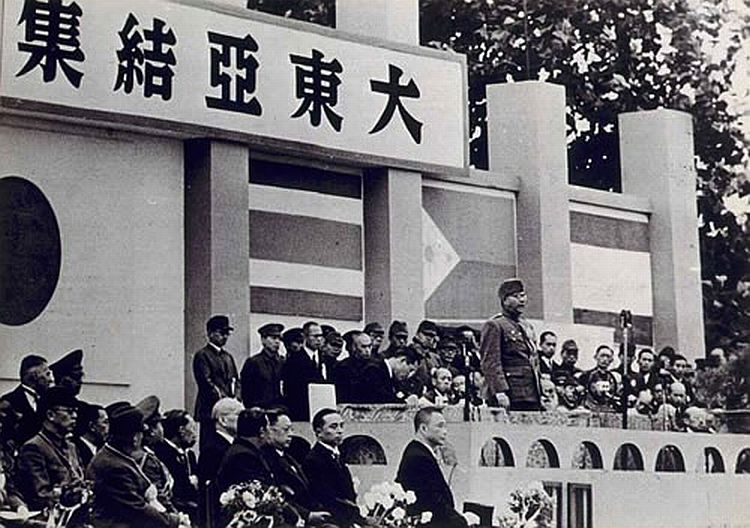
Subhas Chandra Bose addressing a rally in Tokyo, 1943.

Cultural exchanges between India and Japan began early in the 6th century with the introduction of Buddhism to Japan from India. The Indian monk Bodhisena arrived in Japan in 736 to spread Buddhism and performed eye-opening of the Great Buddha built-in Tōdai-ji, and would remain in Japan until his death in 760. Buddhism and the intrinsically linked Indian culture had a great impact on Japanese culture, still felt today, and resulted in a natural sense of amiability between the two nations.

As a result of the link of Buddhism between India and Japan, monks and scholars often embarked on voyages between the two nations. Ancient records from the now-destroyed library at Nalanda University in India describe scholars and pupils who attended the school from Japan. One of the most famous Japanese travellers to the Indian subcontinent was Tenjiku Tokubei (1612–1692), whose nickname was derived from the Japanese name for India.

The cultural exchanges between the two countries created many parallels in their folklore. Modern popular culture based upon this folklore, such as works of fantasy fiction in manga and anime, sometimes bear references to common deities (deva), demons (asura) and philosophical concepts. The Indian goddess Saraswati for example, is known as Benzaiten in Japan. Brahma, known as 'Bonten', and Yama, known as 'Enma', are also part of the traditional Japanese Buddhist pantheon. In addition to the common Buddhist influence on the two societies, Shintoism, being an animist religion, is similar to the animist strands of Hinduism, in contrast to the religions present in the rest of the world, which are monotheistic. Sanskrit, a classical language used in Buddhism and Hinduism, is still used by some ancient Chinese priests who immigrated to Japan, and the Siddhaṃ script is still written to this day, despite having passed out of usage in India. It is also thought that the distinctive torii gateways at temples in Japan, may be related to the torana gateways used in Indian temples.

In the 16th century, Japan established political contact with Portuguese colonies in India. The Japanese initially assumed that the Portuguese were from India and that Christianity was a new "Indian faith". These mistaken assumptions were due to the Indian city of Goa being a central base for the Portuguese East India Company and also due to a significant portion of the crew on Portuguese ships being Indian Christians. Throughout the 16th and 17th centuries, Indian lascar seamen frequently visited Japan as crew members aboard Portuguese ships, and later aboard East India Company merchantmen in the 18th and 19th centuries.

During the anti-Christian persecutions in 1596, many Japanese Christians fled to the Portuguese colony of Goa in India. By the early 17th century, there was a community of Japanese traders in Goa in addition to Japanese slaves brought by Portuguese ships from Japan.

Relations between the two nations have continued since then, but direct political exchange began only in the Meiji era (1868–1912), when Japan embarked on the process of modernisation. Japan-India Association was founded in 1903. Further cultural exchange occurred during the mid-late 20th century through Asian cinema, with Indian cinema and Japanese cinema both experiencing a "golden age" during the 1950s and 1960s. Indian films by Satyajit Ray, Guru Dutt were influential in Japan, while Japanese films by Akira Kurosawa, Yasujirō Ozu and Takashi Shimizu have likewise been influential in India.

== Indian Independence Movement ==
In 1899 Tokyo Imperial University set up a chair in Sanskrit and Pali, with a further chair in Comparative religion being set up in 1903. In this environment, a number of Indian students came to Japan in the early twentieth century, founding the Oriental Youngmen's Association in 1900.

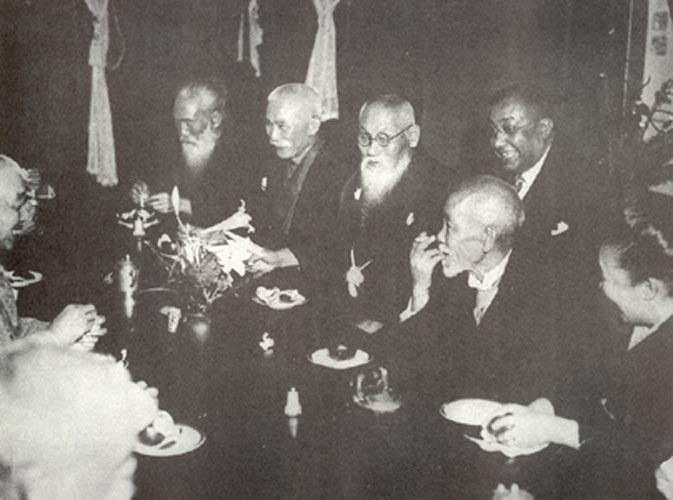
A dinner party given to Rash Behari Bose (the second from the right) in his honour by his close Japanese friends, Mitsuru Tōyama, a Pan-Asianism leader (center, behind the table), and Tsuyoshi Inukai, future Japanese prime minister (to the right of Tōyama). 1915.

The flags of India and Japan.

Sureshchandra Bandopadhyay, Manmatha Nath Ghosh and Hariprobha Takeda were among the earliest Indians who visited Japan and wrote on their experiences there. Correspondences between distinguished individuals from both nations had a noticeable increase in volume during this period; historical documents show a friendship between Japanese thinker Okakura Tenshin and Indian writer Rabindranath Tagore, Okakura Tenshin and Bengali poet Priyamvada Devi. Govindrao N. Potdar established an organisation called the Indo-Japanese Association in 1904 with the help of a Japanese friend Mr. Sakurai, which was dedicated for helping the Indian expatriates migrating to Japan.

As India was then a British colony, Indo-Japanese relations were boosted by the Anglo-Japanese Alliance. However, other emerging movements would strengthen relations between the two nations. Pan-Asian ideals and the Indian independence movement saw India and Japan grow closer, reaching their apogee during the Second World War. Relations between Britain and Japan had started to deteriorate since the end of the Anglo-Japanese Alliance on 17 August 1923 due to American pressure. Many Indian independence activists escaped to Japan, including activist Rash Behari Bose which furthered Indo-Japanese relations. Future Japanese prime minister Tsuyoshi Inukai, pan-Asianist Mitsuru Tōyama and other Japanese individuals supported the Indian independence movement. A. M. Nair, a student from India, became an independence movement activist. Nair supported INA leader Subhas Chandra Bose during the Second World War. Japan started the Pacific phase of the Second World War by attacking British, Dutch, and American possessions in Asia. The Japanese eventually aimed to capture the British colony of Burma, establishing an alliance with the Indian National Army, an Indian nationalist organisation which adopted the "an enemy of our enemy is our friend" attitude, a legacy that is still controversial today given the war crimes committed by Imperial Japan and its allies.

== Before World War II ==
In 1934, the "Indo-Japanese Trade Agreement of 1934" was signed in Delhi on 5 January 1934 and went effective on 12 July 1934.

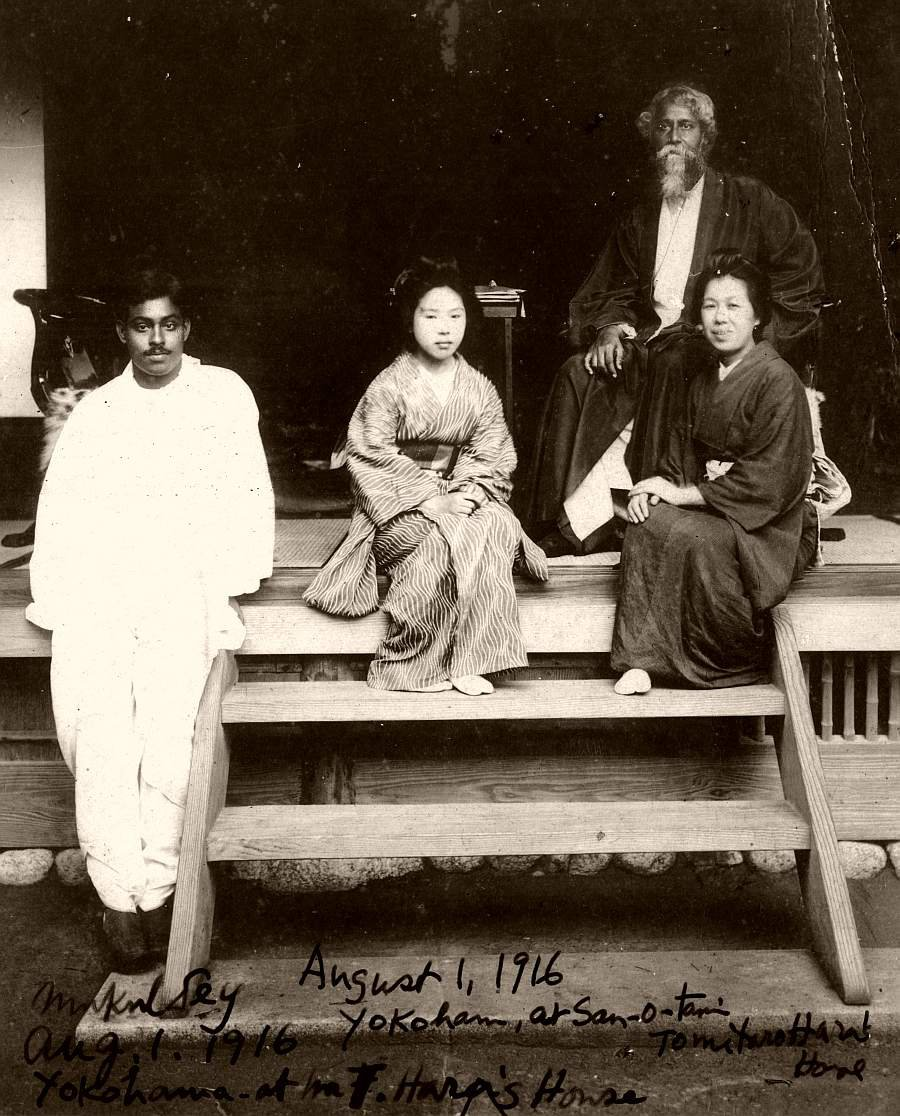
Nobel Laurate Rabindranath Tagore and Mukul Dey with 'Kiyo-san' and another Japanese lady at Tomitaro Hara's Sankei-en in Yokohama, Japan.

This was renewed in 1937 for another 3 years.

== During World War II ==
Since India was an informal empire ruled directly by the Crown when the Second World War broke out, it was deemed to have entered the war on the side of the Allies. Over 2 million Indians participated in the war; many served in combat against the Japanese who briefly occupied British Burma and reached the Indian border. Some 67,000 Indian soldiers were captured by the Japanese when Singapore surrendered in 1942, many of whom later became part of the Japanese-sponsored Indian National Army (INA). In 1944–45, combined British and Indian forces defeated the Japanese in a series of battles in Burma and the INA disintegrated.

=== Indian National Army ===
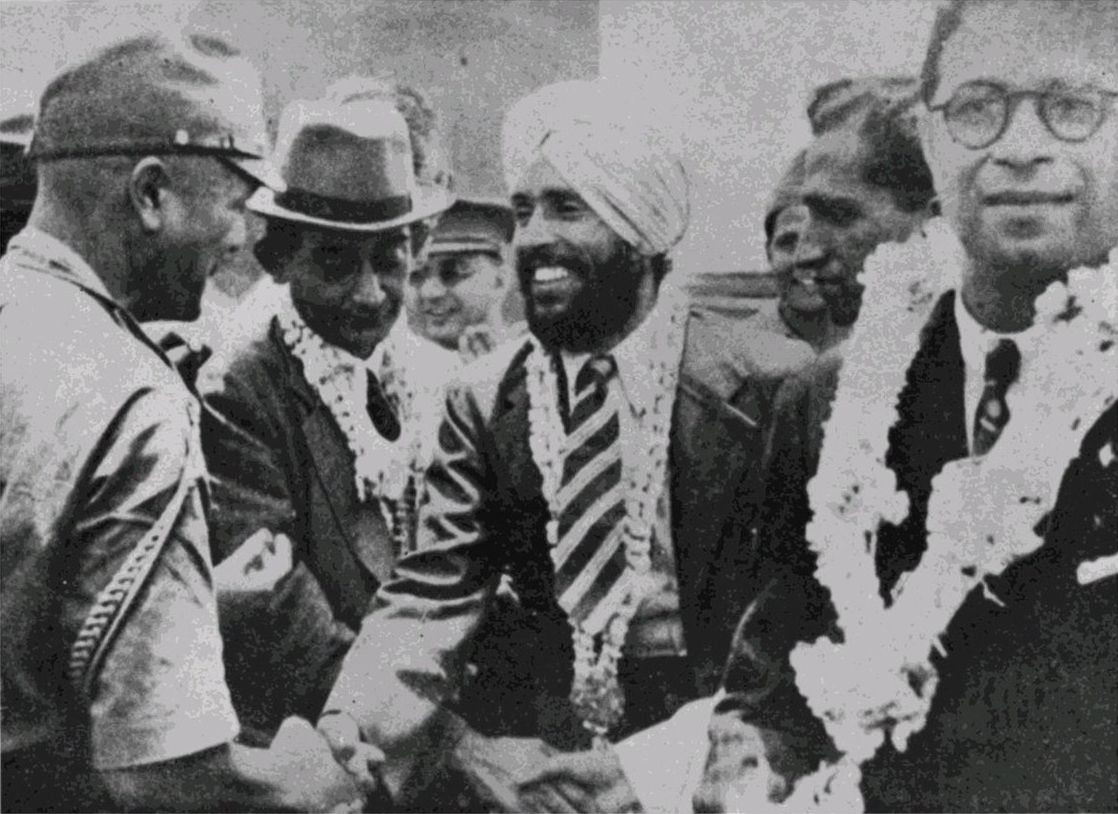
Major Iwaichi Fujiwara of Japan greets Captain Mohan Singh of the First Indian National Army, April 1942.

Subhas Chandra Bose, who led the Azad Hind, a nationalist movement which aimed to end British rule in India through military means, used Japanese sponsorship to form the Azad Hind Fauj or Indian National Army (INA). The INA was composed mainly of former prisoners of war from the Indian Army who had been captured by the Japanese after the fall of Singapore. They joined primarily because of the very harsh, often fatal conditions in Japanese POW camps. The INA also recruited volunteers from Indian expatriates in Southeast Asia. Bose was eager for the INA to participate in any invasion of India and persuaded several Japanese that a victory such as Mutaguchi anticipated would lead to the collapse of British rule in India. The idea that their western boundary would be controlled by a more friendly government was attractive to the Japanese. Japan never expected India to be part of its Greater East Asia Co-Prosperity Sphere.

The Japanese government built, supported, and controlled the Indian National Army and the Indian Independence League. Japanese forces included INA units in many battles, most notably at the U Go Offensive at Manipur. The offensive culminated in the Battles of Imphal and Kohima where the Japanese forces were pushed back and the INA lost cohesion.

== After the Second World War ==
When India became independent in 1947, India and Japan were officially enemy states in the aftermath of the war. The government of India refused to attend the San Francisco peace conference, where the peace treaty between Japan and the western Allied powers was concluded, instead a separate Japanese-Indian peace treaty was concluded on June 9, 1952.
