= Uchimaru Deguchi =

Japanese religious leader, Oomoto religion (1903 – 1973)

- Born: Isao Saga; January 15, 1903; Ōzu, Ehime, Japan
- Died: May 6, 1973 (aged 70); Kameoka, Kyoto, Japan
- Occupations: assistant to the spiritual leader of Oomoto, president of Oomoto
- Spouse: Yaeno Deguchi

Uchimaru Deguchi (出口宇知麿/出口宇知丸) (January 15, 1903 – May 6, 1973), also known as Isao Deguchi (出口伊佐男), was an assistant to the spiritual leader of the Japanese new religious organization Oomoto and its president. He was the adopted son of Onisaburo Deguchi, who was one of the founders of Oomoto.

== Early life ==
He was born on January 15, 1903, in Ōzu, Ehime Prefecture, as the eldest son of Kamekichi and Shinayo Saga. His original name of Uchimaru Deguchi is Isao Saga (佐賀伊佐男). He lost his father at the age of seven. Through a female acquaintance named Mon Sasaki, Shinayo joined Oomoto. Following her, Isao began worshipping the Oomoto's god at a household Shinto altar. Although Isao excelled academically, his family could not afford to send him for higher education. He received a scholarship funded by a local businessman and enrolled in Yawatahama Commercial School (present-day, Yawatahama High School).

== Joining Oomoto ==
During his summer vacation in August 1918, Isao was accompanied by Sasaki on a visit to the Oomoto's headquarters in Ayabe, Kyoto Prefecture. There, he met Onisaburo Deguchi and his wife, Sumi Deguchi, the second spiritual leader of Oomoto. Sasaki offered Onisaburo the opportunity for Isao to serve Oomoto. Isao was moved when Onisaburo accepted the offer on the spot and told him to return to Ayabe as soon as possible. In October, with Shinayo's understanding and support, Isao left school, moved to Ayabe, and began working in Oomoto's publishing department alongside about ten other followers. At that time, the department had only one treadle printing machine and published one biweekly magazine and one monthly journal. He exchanged greetings with Nao Deguchi, the foundress of Oomoto, on several occasions before her death on November 6, 1918.

In 1919, the printing facility was expanded, and by March 1920, the number of followers working in the publishing department had increased to twenty-seven. By the end of that year, in addition to periodicals, Oomoto published a large number of books, including the Oomoto Shin'yu, one of the Oomoto scriptures. Due to overwork, Isao's eyesight had deteriorated so severely that he took a month off at the officer's recommendation.

On February 12, 1921, the Kyoto Police Department mobilized approximately 130 officers under the instruction of Prosecutor General Kiichirō Hiranuma and raided Oomoto. Onisaburo was arrested and charged with lèse majesté and violation of the Newspaper Law. This incident is known as the First Oomoto Incident. The police ransacked the Oomoto's headquarters, searching in vain for evidence of sedition and revolution. Isao, who was eighteen years old at the time, later recalled the Incident, and stated that although rumors of a crackdown had been circulating for some time, he was still astonished to see armed police officers storm in. He was impressed by the calm attitude of the followers, in contrast to the bustle of the police. Thinking that his mother must be worried, Isao sent her a letter explaining that the Incident had never shaken his faith or caused him to distrust the teachings of Oomoto. After being detained for 126 days, Onisaburo was released from prison in June.

In April 1922, Onisaburo selected Isao to be his attendant because of his quiet, meticulous personality and fervent faith.

== Adoption into the Deguchi Family (1922) ==
In October 1922 (though one source states it was January 31, 1924.), Isao was adopted into the Deguchi family and was given the name Uchimaru(宇知丸).

On February 3, 1924, at the age of twenty-two, Uchimaru married sixteen-year-old Yaeno Deguchi, the third daughter of Onisaburo. Ten days later, Onisaburo escaped Japan with three followers, including Morihei Ueshiba (who would later found Aikido), and went on an expedition to Mongolia. He did not notify Oomoto's executives of the plan of this expedition, and entrusted Uchimaru with a document entitled "Nishiki no miyage". In this document, Onisaburo appointed Uchimaru with absolute authority within Oomoto, alongside Sumi and Naohi Deguchi, who had been appointed the third spiritual leader of Oomoto in 1910. He also appointed Uchimaru as an assistant to Sumi and Naohi, and his successor in divine duties. Onisaburo also declared, in the form of a divine revelation, that Uchimaru was his real son spiritually. In Mongolia, Onisaburo was captured by the local warlord Zhang Zuolin and nearly executed. He was rescued by the Japanese consulate and returned to Japan in July.

== Managing Affairs in Oomoto-Affiliated Organizations ==
In 1923, Onisaburo adopted Esperanto with the aim of utilizing it to develop Oomoto’s cosmopolitanism. In June, for the purpose of promoting Esperanto, an association Esperanto Fukyū-kai (Esperanto Propaganda Asocio) was founded, with Uchimaru becoming its president. Fukyū-kai published a journal “La Verda Mondo", and established more than one hundred branches. A pamphlet introducing Oomoto was published in Esperanto and sent to Esperanto-related associations and individuals in forty-eight countries. These associations published articles about Oomoto in their journals, which made Oomoto well-known in the West through Esperantists.

In June 1925, an association Jinrui Aizen-kai (Universal Love and Brotherhood Association; U.L.B.A.) was founded, with Uchimaru becoming its president. Its main doctrines included that "the world is one, and mankind are naturally brethren." and its founding principles stressed that members should "resolve to realize the ideal of world peace, based on a comprehension of the common origin of religions and on universal love and brotherhood." In Manchuria, U.L.B.A. provided charitable relief to refugees, together with the Red Swastika Society. In order to gain permission to obtain land and build a headquarters, Uchimaru lobbied executives at the South Manchuria Railway. By 1935, U.L.B.A. established 962 domestic and 279 overseas branches. It also published the monthly journal Jinrui Aizen Shimbun, with Uchimaru becoming its president. In March 1934, circulation reached one million copies.

On February 1, 1928, the wedding of Naohi and Hidemaru Deguchi was held. Uchimaru took this opportunity to resign from his position as an assistant to the spiritual leader.

In November 1931, in light of the Mukden incident, the Oomoto headquarters announced that situation was one of emergency. And Shōwa Seinen-kai (the Shōwa Young Men's Association), a group which had been formed by young Oomoto followers in various regions, was reorganized into a unified, nationwide association to unite young people's passion in the face of emergency and to immediately carry out the instructions of its president Onisaburo (and Uchimaru became his assistant.) In 1932, Seinen-kai instituted uniforms for its members and conducted basic training for group activities, taking care to avoid a military style. It also conducted a campaign to raise awareness of air defense by publishing pamphlets and holding the exhibitions throughout the country.

On July 22, 1934, an association Shōwa Shinsei-kai (The Shōwa Sacred Association) was founded. Onisaburo became its president, and Uchimaru and a right-wing leader Ryōhei Uchida became its vice presidents. Shinsei-kai became widely known to the public through its campaigns calling for the abolition of the Washington Naval Treaty, and denouncing "Emperor as Organ Theory", the political theory holding that national sovereign power rested with the state and not with the emperor, who exercised power only in his capacity as the highest organ of the state under a constitutional structure. Along with the movement to enhance Kōdō (the Imperial Way), Shinsei-kai devoted its best efforts to the movement to relieve rural areas. Uchimaru, Uchida and Tōyama Mitsuru became advisors to the farmers' union founded by the Oomoto followers in Tottori Prefecture, and Shinsei-kai's regional headquarters launched a signature campaign advocating for rural relief and the postponement of loan repayments. Uchimaru also worked to popularize "the Aizen-style upland rice cultivation method", a unique method that included crop rotation between upland rice and wheat, replanting of mulberry fields, and utilization of wastelands.

The authorities considered the rapid growth of Shinsei-kai to be dangerous, and decided to portray Oomoto as a "conspiracy group plotting to change the national polity" and to destroy it through the second crackdown.

=== The Second Oomoto Incident (1935) ===
On December 6, 1935, just before the Second Oomoto Incident, Ikki Kita, the mastermind behind the February 26 Incident, secretly met with Onisaburo at Oomoto's headquarters. He revealed his coup plan and demanded 250,000 yen in funding. Onisaburo dismissed the demand, saying that God had told him not to give money to kill people. When Kita forced Onisaburo to choose between the funds and his life, Onisaburo told him to wait four or five days, and promised to offer Uchimaru as a hostage.

That evening, as Uchimaru was preparing to take an overnight train to Tokyo, a familiar reporter from the Mainichi Shimbun visited him on urgent business. The reporter told Uchimaru that the authorities were taking suspicious actions against Oomoto, and asked if he knew anything about it. Uchimaru told the reporter he did not know anything and took the train. The next day, upon arriving in Tokyo, he was warned to beware of rogues plotting to abduct him for ransom. Therefore, when he was woken up by a prosecutor and some police officers burst into Shinsei-kai's headquarters in Yotsuya at 4:30 a.m. on December 8, he assumed that they were the abductors. Uchimaru was arrested, and taken to Kyoto the next day. On the way, he suspected that the arrest was due to the criticism of Prime Minister Keisuke Okada, which had been published in the Jinrui Aizen Shimbun.

During the police interrogation, Uchimaru was forced to make a false confession. Regarding torture, in addition to some slaps in the face that he revealed officially in the petition, it is said that deep needle marks were found on the fingernails of both his hands when he was released from prison. During the preparatory procedure, Uchimaru explained the circumstances of the interrogation, and explained why the pretrial transcript was inconsistent with the facts. At the first trial, he gave a serious explanation of the Oomoto doctrines and movements, as if he were representing the entire sect. Legal experts such as prosecutors and clerks later recalled being impressed by Uchimaru's intelligence, strong faith, liveliness, and courtesy during the second trial.

In a prison cell, except when sleeping, Uchimaru always sat upright and read books. He later told to his son, Yasuaki Deguchi, that he was really grateful to be able to study to his heart's content. He considered his life in prison to be a training from god, and was determined to test his endurance. Therefore, when he was struck by a whitlow, he refused anesthesia and remained calm during the operation, surprising the doctors. He was released twice briefly: once to visit his wife Yaeno, when she had acute pneumonia, and once to attend the funeral of his birth mother, Shinayo.

On February 29, 1940, the first trial convicted Uchimaru guilty of violating the Peace Preservation Law and sentenced him to fifteen years of penal servitude. On July 31, 1942, the second trial found him not guilty. On August 7, six years and eight months after his arrest, Uchimaru was released on bail along with Onisaburo and Sumi.

== Restart of Oomoto (1946) ==
On February 14, 1946, Oomoto restarted as Aizen-en, and Uchimaru was appointed chairman. In July, Onisaburo and Sumi embarked on a pilgrimage to Wakayama Prefecture, accompanied by Uchimaru. During this pilgrimage, which was Onisaburo's final one, he told about Oomoto's past and future to Uchimaru. On January 19, 1947, Onisaburo died at the age of seventy-six. In his funeral address, Uchimaru stated that Onisaburo had lived his life as the redeemer, and after completely establishing the foundation for divine works in this world, he returned to the divine world to fulfill divine works there.

From 1947 to 1951, Uchimaru toured nearly every major city in Japan, delivering a lecture titled "The Establishment of New Japan and Aizen-en." Aizen-en was renamed to Oomoto Aizen-en on October 29, 1949, and then to Oomoto on April 1, 1952, with Uchimaru appointed as its president. In April 1958, he resigned and was succeeded by Eiji Deguchi.

=== Commitment to the World Federalist Movement ===
On December 8, 1949, U.L.B.A. was relaunched, with Uchimaru appointed as its chairman. (In August 1959, he resigned as chairman, succeeded by Eiji Deguchi, and became its honorary chairman.)

He participated in the Peoples' World Constituent Assembly, which took place in Geneva from December 30, 1950 to January 5, 1951, as one of seventeen participants from Japan. He was surprised to be welcomed by many Esperantists who were already familiar with Oomoto through their Esperanto activities. Before returning to Japan on February 3, 1951, he visited Italy, France, Belgium, Germany, the United Kingdom, and the United States, exchanging opinions with pacifists, federalists and Oomoto followers. On January 2, he met with Pope Pius XII at the Vatican and presented him with a pamphlet about the Jinrui Aizen movement.

The preparatory committee for the First Asian Conference For the World Federation was organized with Yukio Ozaki as chairman and Toyohiko Kagawa and Ryūtarō Takahashi as vice chairmen. Uchimaru was appointed to one of the members of the management board alongside Hanako Muraoka and Byakuren Miyazaki (Byakuren Yanagiwara). The Conference took place in Hiroshima City, from November 3 to 6, 1952, with attendees included Nobel Peace Prize laureate John Boyd Orr from the United Kingdom; Radhabinod Pal from India; Tunku Abdul Rahman from Malaysia; and Son Sann from Cambodia. The Second Asian Conference took place in Tokyo from November 1 to 5, 1954. Uchimaru announced the Conference's declaration and resolution. The Third Asian Conference took place in Kyoto City from October 18 to 21, 1957. Uchimaru was appointed chairman of the preparatory committee, and alongside Kagawa, became the driving force behind the Conference.

On February 22, 1959, Uchimaru became vice president of Sekai Renpō Kensetsu Dōmei (present-day, World Federalist Movement of Japan), which president was Sumi Yukawa. On August 30, 1963, he became a member of the Executive Committee of the World Association of World Federalists, which appointed Hideki Yukawa president from 1961, and was succeeded by Norman Cousins in 1965. As head of the Japanese delegation, he attended the 12th Congress of the World Association of World Federalists, which took place in San Francisco from June 20 to 26, 1965.

=== Interactions with other religious organizations ===
On January 30, 1952, Uchimaru was appointed one of fifteen members (including Shinobu Orikuchi) of the Religious Juridical Persons Council, an advisory body to the Minister of Education.

On November 1, 1952, he was appointed as a councilor of the International Moslem Association.

Uchimaru served on the Preparatory Committee for the Conference of World Religionists, an international conference of religionists that took place in Tokyo from August 1 to 4, 1955. The Conference adopted resolutions banning atomic and hydrogen bombs and establishing an international organization for religious cooperation. Oomoto was enthusiastic about the Conference and called for further conferences to be held in Kameoka and Ayabe after the main Conference in Tokyo.

In July 1956, he visited Vietnam at the invitation of the Caodaist Missionary Church, an organization of Caodaism whose ties with Oomoto had been suspended due to the Second Oomoto Incident. He attended a ceremony celebrating the completion of their headquarters in Da Nang, a memorial service for martyrs, and meetings with representatives of various religious organizations. On his way home, he visited the headquarters of the Red Swastika Society in Hong Kong.

On January 25, 1962, Japan Red Swastika Society was founded, with Uchimaru appointed honorary chairman.

== Death ==
On May 6, 1973, Uchimaru died of cancer at his home in Kameoka, at the age of seventy.

Naohi Deguchi composed tanka poems in memory of her deceased brother-in-law. In them, she reflected on how few people truly knew about Uchimaru, who lived a life of Aizen (divine love), and she praised him for setting a great example of how to die.

On the day Uchimaru died, Sumi Yukawa attended a board meeting of Sekai Renpō Kensetsu Dōmei, which in April he had informed her and his husband Hideki Yukawa in the hospital that he would not be able to attend. In her memoir, Sumi wrote that, when she heard he had died at 6 p.m., just after the meeting had ended, she could not help but feel that he had protected her from his deathbed.

== Sources ==
- (in Japanese)『松のひびき-出口うちまるを偲びて-』"Matsu no Hibiki -Deguchi Uchimaru wo Shinobite-" Edited by Yasuaki Deguchi, Printed by Tenseisha and Published on May 6, 1974.
- (in Japanese)『南予の群像』"Nanyo no Gunzō" Published by Shin Ehime on April 10, 1966.
- (in Japanese)『人事興信録 第24版・下』"Jinji Kōshinroku the 24th Edition Vol.2" Published by Jinji Kōshinsho on March 14, 1968.
- (in Japanese)『最後の特高警察』"Saigo no Tokkō Keisatu" Written by Matsuo Dōgin, Published by Shirakawa Shoin on February 1, 1973.
- (in Japanese)『大本七十年史 上巻』"Oomoto Nanajūnen-shi: Jōkan" Edited by Oomoto Nanajūnen-shi Hensan-kai, Published by Oomoto, a religion corporation on February 4, 1964.
- (in Japanese)『近代民衆宗教史の研究 増訂版』"Kindai Minshū Shūkyō-shi no Kenkyū Zōtei-ban" Written by Shigeyoshi Murakami, Published by Hōzōkan on November 10, 1963.
- "Prophet Motive: Deguchi Onisaburō, Oomoto, and the Rise of New Religions in Imperial Japan" Written by Nancy K. Stalker, Published by University of Hawaiʻi Press, ISBN 978-0-8248-3226-1.
- (in Japanese)『京都百年』"Kyoto Hyakunen" Edited by Hideo Matsumura, Published by The Mainichi Newspapers on October 25, 1968.
- (in Japanese)『出口なお王仁三郎の予言・確言』"Deguchi Nao Onisaburo no Yogen Kakugen" Written by Yasuaki Deguchi, Published by Miizusha on March 20, 2005, ISBN 4-900441-72-4 C0014.
- (in Japanese)『第三次大本事件の真相』"Daisanji Oomoto Jiken no Shinsō" Written by Ryū Towada, Published by Jiyū Kokuminsha on June 20, 1986. ISBN 4-426-60003-0 C0036.
- (in Japanese)『評伝 出口王仁三郎』"Hyōden Deguchi Onisaburo" Written by Shigeyoshi Murakami, Published by Sanseido on August 15, 1978.
- (in Japanese)『エスペラント運動史年表』"Esperanto Undōshi Nenpyō" Edited by Japana Esperanto-Instituto, Published by Japana Esperanto-Instituto on October 20, 1932.
- "THE GREAT ONISABURO DEGUCHI" Written by Kyotaro Deguchi, Published by Oomoto Foundation in 1973.
- (in Japanese)『大本七十年史 下巻』"Oomoto Nanajūnen-shi: Gekan" Edited by Oomoto Nanajūnen-shi Hensan-kai, Published by Oomoto, a religion corporation on August 7, 1967.
- (in Japanese)『歴史とアイデンティティ』"Rekishi to Identity" Written by Akira Kurihara, Published by Shinyōsha on October 1, 1982.
- (in Japanese)『日本史研究 第七五号』"Nihonshi Kenkyu (Journal of Japanese History): The Military Fascism and the Oomoto Sect" Written by Fujio Maeshima, Published by Nihonshi Kenkyukai (The Japanese Society of Historical Studies) on November 20, 1964.
- (in Japanese)『写真図説 民衆の宗教・大本』"Shashin Zusetsu Minshū no Shūkyō Oomoto" Supervised by Eiji Deguchi, Published by Gakutōsha on April 8, 1970.
- (in Japanese)『日本政治裁判史録 昭和・後』"Nihon Seiji Saiban Shiroku: Shōwa Kō" Edited by Sakae Wagatsuma, Published by Daiichi Hōki Shuppan on November 10, 1970.
- (in Japanese)『世界連邦運動二十年史』"Sekai Renpō Nijūnen-shi" Edited by Sekai Renpō Kensetsu Dōmei, Published by Sekai Renpō Kensetsu Dōmei on May 1, 1969.
- (in Japanese)『世界連邦その思想と運動』"Sekai Renpō Sono Shisō to Undō" Written by Masaaki Tanaka, Published by Heibonsha on November 1, 1974.
- (in Japanese)『時事年鑑 昭和34年版』"Jiji Almanac 1959" Edited by Yūzō Ikeda, Published by Jiji Press, Ltd. on October 1, 1958.
- (in Japanese)『日本会社録 第7版』"Nihon Kaisharoku: the 7th Edition" Published by Kojunsha Shuppan-kyoku on June 20, 1970.
- (in Japanese)『世界平和への歩み』"Sekai Heiwa eno Ayumi" Published by Japanese Youth Association For World Federation on September 25, 1965.
- (in Japanese)『北国年鑑 昭和二十八年版』"Hokkoku Nenkan: Shōwa 28-nen Edition" Published by Hokkoku Shimbunsha on November 20, 1952.
- (in Japanese)『日本宗教大鑑』"Nihon Shūkyō Taikan" Edited by Ryūen Yamanaka, Published by Buddhistsha on September 23, 1973.
- (in Japanese)『日本探検』"Nippon Tanken" Written by Tadao Umesao, Published by Kodansha on September 10, 2014. ISBN 978-4-06-292254-8.
- (in Japanese)『苦楽の園』"Kuraku no Sono" Written by Sumi Yukawa, Published by Kodansha on November 28, 1976.
