= Kohinata Hakurō =

Japanese bandit

Kohinata Hakurō 小日向白朗
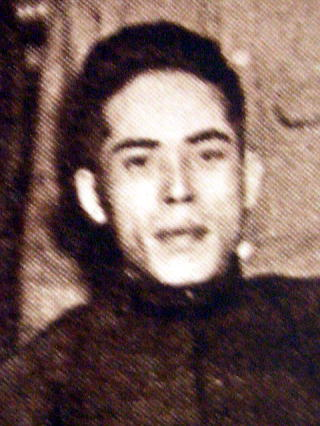
- Kohinata Hakurō in 1932
- Born: Kohinata Takematsu 小日向健松; January 31st, 1900; Sanjō, Niigata Prefecture
- Died: January 5th, 1982 (Aged 81); Shinjuku, Tokyo
- Other names: Shang Xudong, Shao Rixiang (Chinese pseudonyms)
- Occupation(s): Mounted bandit Continental rōnin

Kohinata Hakurō (Japanese: 小日向白朗, Hiragana: こひなた はくろう; January 31, 1900 - January 5, 1982), born Kohinata Takematsu (Chinese pseudonyms include Xiang Lang, Shang Xudong, and Shao Rixiang), courtesy name Senzan Koji, was a notorious Japanese mounted bandit in China. He was commonly called "The Little White Dragon" by Chinese locals of the areas he was active in.

== Life ==
=== Early life ===
Kohinata Hakurō was born in Sanjō, Niigata Prefecture. Early in his life, he admired general Fukushima Yasumasa, who in 1892 rode on horseback by himself from Berlin to Vladivostok, crossing two continents. At the age of 17, Kohinata had the choice to go to China, Tibet, and Germany for an investigation, so he chose to go to China. He joined the Gen'yousha (Dark Ocean Society) led by nationalist Toyama Mitsuru. During his time in China, he was thought highly of by Banzai Rihachirō of the Kwantung Army, and he worked hard to learn the Chinese language and archery. Banzai, who was engaged in espionage at the time, regarded Kohinata as a close disciple.

At the age of 20, Kohinata was to head to Ulan Bator in Mongolia, but he was attacked and captured by mounted bandits. He claimed his father's surname was Shao, and that he was a half-Chinese and half-Japanese person trying to find his father. The head of the bandits, Yang Qingshan, recruited him into the band, saving his life. Kohinata was given the name Shao Rixiang.

=== North Chinese bandit ===
After joining the band, Kohinata became proficient in fighting, and gradually gained fame as he participated in battles. After Yang Qingshan's death, Kohinata took up this position as head of the mounted bandits in Northern China. Once, Kohinata was arrested in Jianping County, Rehe Province, and sentenced to death, but he was aided and broken out by soldiers of the Changkya Khutukhtu, with whom he had developed a good relationship with.

Later, Kohinata went to Wuliangguan, the "Holy Land" of mounted bandits. He studied the old Chinese martial arts tactics of the Taoist Wudang faction and Quanzhen Way. His master, Ge Yuetan, gave him the name Shang Xudong, as well as a Browning pistol decorated with a dragon and the Big Dipper constellation. Due to this, he was called the "Gun Against Evil - the Little White Dragon", which led to the use of his popular nickname, the Little White Dragon.

=== Military activities ===
Kohinata was taken under the wing of Zhang Zongchang, general of the Fengtian clique and subordinate to Zhang Zuolin, and participated in the Second Zhili-Fengtian War. However, after the Huanggutun Incident in 1928, Kohinata started conspiring against the Fengtian clique in secret, but he failed and was expelled.

In 1924, Ōmoto leaders Onisaburo Deguchi and Morihei Ueshiba headed to Inner Mongolia on the invitation of mounted bandit Lu Zhankui. However, they were attacked by Zhang Zuolin and captured. Kohinata, having heard of this, went around, eventually confirming they were Japanese, leading to Zhang Zuolin releasing them.

In 1935, Kohinata, on the orders of the Kwantung Army, joined the Green Gang in Tianjin. He became a senior leader of the "Tong" group in the gang, and pushed for the autonomy of the Five Northern Provinces of China. During World War II, Kohinata was ordered to pursue his activities in Shanghai.

After Japan's surrender in 1945, Kohinata was found in a villa in Qianzhou, Wuxi, Jiangsu Province by the National Government, and arrested for the crime of treason (hanjian). However, it was confirmed that he was not of Chinese but of Japanese nationality. Therefore, he could not be prosecuted for treason, and so he was released, going back to Japan.

Kohinata later served as an advisor to the intelligence agency of the Ikeda cabinet. He died in Shinjuku, Tokyo in 1982.

== In popular culture ==
- Many adventure series were serialized about Kohinata in the 1920s in Shōnen Kurabu and Nihon no Shōnen.
- "馬賊戦記 - 小日向白朗蘇るヒーロー" (2005) and "馬賊 - 中国仁侠の自衛組織" (1974) are stories based on the adventures of Kohinata.
- "Ookami no Seiza" (1985, published in Shōnen Jump) and "龙" (1991 - 2006, published in Big Comic Original monthly) are manga that feature Kohinata. The former's author, Mitsuteru Yokoyama, had consulted Kohinata, who was alive during its production.
