= Mounted bandits =

Horse-riding bandits in early 20th-century Manchuria

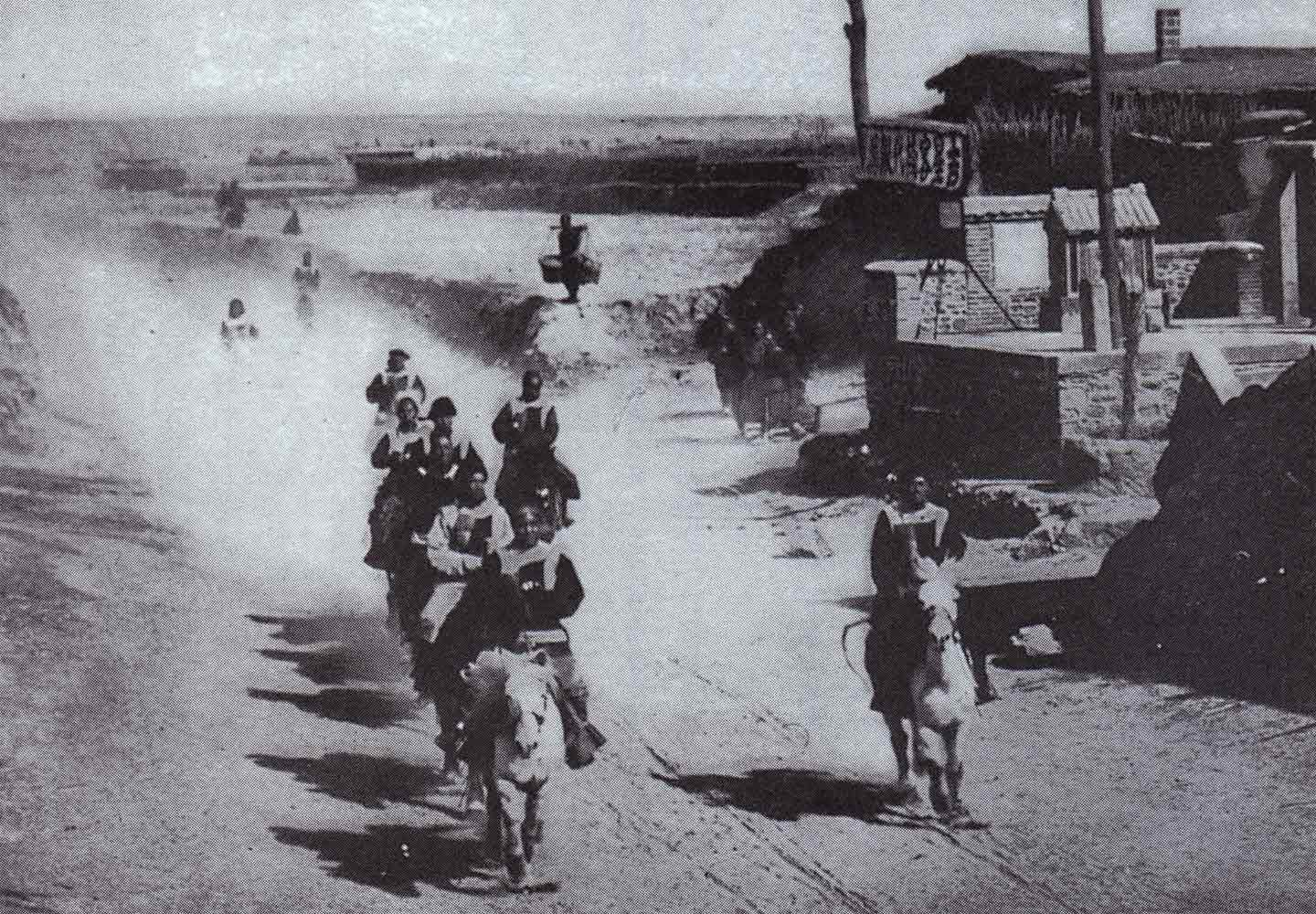
Mounted bandits during the Battle of Mukden

A mounted bandit (Chinese: 馬賊, romanized: mǎzéi, Japanese: 馬賊, romanized: bazoku) is a bandit who uses horseback for mobility. The term is particularly used for mounted bandits who were active in Manchuria and its surrounding region from the end of the Qing Dynasty to the Manchukuo period.

== History ==
Despite their strong association with banditry, the mounted bandits originated with guerrilla activities by vigilante self-defence organisations. With the decline of the Qing Dynasty, public safety worsened, and Manchuria became infested with thieves. The locals formed self-defence organisations to counter this. But after the 1911 Revolution, as the chaos in Manchuria intensified, the more powerful vigilantes went beyond their original goal of self-defence and began acting as bandits themselves.

The mounted bandits valued horsemanship and sharpshooting skills. Members of the same gang generally belonged to the same clan or ancestral home, although they were sometimes joined by foreigners such as Koreans, White Russians, and Japanese continental ronin.

In theory, mounted bandits followed a code of conduct like the youxia in Water Margin, for example forbidding rape and abuse. There were cases of charitable deeds by mounted bandits, like giving to the poor or building roads and bridges. However, in practice the majority of them were not disciplined.

Cliques quickly developed among them to pursue common goals. However, due to the changing goals of mounted bandits and the powers surrounding them, their alliances were always short-lived. Zhang Zuolin and Ma Zhanshan are famous examples of mounted bandits who became warlords despite the repeated failures of peaceful transition of power in China, by taking charge of military matters for the ruling party. Since China did not have conscription at the time, the ruling powers employed mounted bandits as regular soldiers, and leaders of mounted bandits sometimes gave themselves self-styled governmental titles or military ranks. In the early days of the Fengtian clique, most of its generals were mounted bandits.

Mounted bandits were used by several major powers that wanted to expand their influence in the region. During the Russo-Japanese War, both the Russian and the Japanese Empires paid bandits to harass, spy on and sabotage enemy troops. Later, the Soviets also used them to consolidate their rule of Outer Mongolia. As the Kwantung Army strengthened their rule in Manchuria, the mounted bandits increasingly came into conflict with the Japanese and engaged in anti-Japanese attacks all over Manchuria. However, some collaborated with the Japanese army, which financed them to stop the spread of communism into Inner Mongolia and to encourage separatism in Manchuria.

During China's Warlord era, it was common for warlords to call their enemies "bandits", and their actions against them "bandit extermination". Japanese propaganda also used the mounted bandits, and the need to suppress them, to justify their military presence in Korea and China. The stereotypes associated with mounted bandits in East Asia partly derive from this propaganda. The Korean Independence Army was portrayed by Japanese propaganda as a mounted bandit gang, although that classification is disputed by South Korean historians. Some historians believe that the Hunchun incident, which the Japanese used as a pretext for the Gando Massacre, was in fact staged by Japanese-aligned mounted bandits.

After the collapse of Manchukuo in 1945, the mounted bandit system collapsed too. In the civil war between the Kuomintang and the Chinese Communist Party (the second phase of the Chinese Civil War), the mounted bandits joined either camp and dispersed, eventually being assimilated into the army.

== Notable mounted bandits ==
- Zhang Zuolin
- Zhang Jinghui
- Kohinata Hakurō
- Date Junnosuke
- Ma Zhanshan
- Harada Sanosuke. Although he died in 1868, there is a legend that he in fact survived, escaped Japan and became a mounted bandit, reappearing as an old man in 1907.

== See also ==
- Honghuzi
- Shanlin
- Continental ronin
