= Ryohei Uchida =

Ryōhei Uchida may refer to:

- Ryōhei Uchida (内田 良平, 1873 – 1937), Japanese ultranationalist political activist
- Ryōhei Uchida (actor) (内田 良平, 1924 – 1984), Japanese actor
