= Kohinata =

Kohinata (written: 小日向) is a Japanese surname. Notable people with the surname include:

- Fumiyo Kohinata (小日向 文世, born 1954), Japanese actor
- Kohinata Hakurō (小日向 白朗, 1900–1982), Japanese bandit
- Kazuki Kohinata (小日向 一輝, born 1994), Japanese swimmer
- Shie Kohinata (小日向 しえ, born 1979), Japanese actress, television personality and singer

== Fictional characters ==
- Hayami Kohinata (小日向 はやみ), a character in the visual novel H2O: Footprints in the Sand
- Kanade Kohinata (小日向 かなで), a character in the video game series La Corda d'Oro
- Mangetsu Kohinata (小日向 満月), protagonist of the anime series Granbelm
- Miku Kohinata, a character in the anime Senki Zesshou Symphogear

== See also ==
- Kohinata, Tokyo, a neighbourhood in the Bunkyō ward of Tokyo, Japan
- Hinata
