= Date Junnosuke =

Japanese bandit

- 伊達 順之助 (Japanese) 張宗援 (Chinese)
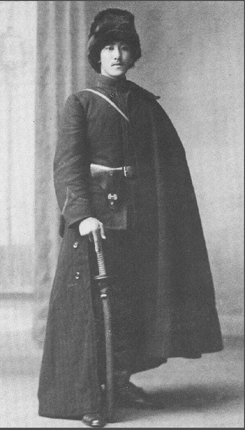
- Date in a Korean border guard uniform, 1921
- Born: January 6, 1892; Sendai, Empire of Japan
- Died: September 9, 1948 (aged 56); Tilanqiao Prison, Shanghai, Republic of China
- Cause of death: Execution by shooting
- Occupations: Mounted bandit Continental rōnin
- Movement: Manchu-Mongol Independence Movement, Shandong Autonomy Movement
- Status: Executed
- Conviction: War crimes
- Penalty: Death

Date Junnosuke (伊達 順之助; DAH-tay; January 6, 1892 – September 9, 1948) (Chinese: 伊達順之助; pinyin: Yīdá Shùnzhīzhù), also known by his adopted Chinese name Zhang Zongyuan (Note: In this Chinese name, the family name is Zhang.) (Chinese: 張宗援; pinyin: Zhāng Zōngyuán; Wade–Giles: Chang^{1} Tsung^{1}-yüan^{2}), was a Japanese mounted bandit and continental rōnin active in early 20th century China. He was a part of the Manchu-Mongol Independence Movement and the Shandong Autonomy Movement. He was a descendant of Date Masamune and a member of the Date clan.

== Early life ==
Date Junnosuke was born to a Kazoku family, descended from the Daimyō of the Sendai Domain, the Date clan. His grandfather, Date Munenari, was a former daimyo and government minister in the early Meiji period. His father, Baron Date Muneatsu, was former governor of the Sendai Domain. He went to several schools, including Azabu Junior High School, Keio Junior High School, Gakushuin, and Rikkyo Junior High School.

Date was known for not being a well-behaved youth. As a student in Rikkyo Junior High School, on May 13, 1909, an argument with delinquent youths in Akashichō, Tokyo, escalated to the point where Date pulled out his gun and shot them, killing them. On October 15, 1909, the Tokyo District Court sentenced him to 12 years in prison. The sentence was shortened to 6 years after an appeal ruling in June 1910, at the request of the Date family lawyers. Detective Saburo Iwai's investigation of the victim's behavior helped the Date family lawyers' defence that he was acting in self-defence. The Supreme Court of Judicature of Japan gave him probation and released him.

He finally graduated from Kaijo High School in 1914 and was accepted into Waseda University to study at the Faculty of Literature. However, he later dropped out.

== Political activities ==
In 1916, Kawashima Naniwa and Prince Shanqi created the Second Manchu-Mongol Independence Movement, which Date joined. He traveled to China, where he became a continental ronin. The movement failed.

Date was good friends with Ikki Kita, Shumei Okawa, and Onisaburo Deguchi. He participated in a 1916 plot to assassinate Zhang Zuolin and a 1919 plot to assassinate Yamagata Aritomo.

In 1919, Date came under the Governor-General of Korea, Saitō Makoto. He traveled to Korea and became the chief of the border guard in Uiju County. In 1923, he raided a base of armed Koreans.

In 1929, he made a pact of brotherhood with Fengtian clique warlord Zhang Zongchang, leading to Date renaming himself Zhang Zongyuan and trying to integrate into Chinese society, changing his nationality to Chinese in 1931. He commanded the Kenkoku Dainigun. On July 27, 1935, Date tried to support a coup in Beijing, but failed.

== Second Sino-Japanese War ==
He was a firm believer in the autonomy or independence of the Manchu, Mongol, and Lu (Han Chinese people from Shandong) peoples. He led 4,000 troops from Manchuria to Shandong in 1937, using his connections to transfer himself to Shandong. He took over Jinan and used it as his headquarters as the "King" of Shandong. He advised many bandit units in the Jehol campaign. He created the Shandong Autonomy Allied Army in 1938 under the orders of General Terauchi Hisaichi. In late January 1939, he led a massacre in Ye County (today known as Laizhou), killing around 400 people. This was known as the Yexian (Ye County) Incident, and led to the dissolution of Date's unit in 1940. In 1945, Date tried to organize a unit called the Zhang Zongyuan Unit, but his attempt was unsuccessful and the unit failed quickly.

After the surrender of Japan at the end of World War II, Date was arrested for war crimes. He was held in the Qingdao Detention Center and moved to the Shanghai Temporary War Criminal Detention Center. He was sentenced to death, and Date was moved to Shanghai Prison, where he was executed by firing squad on September 9, 1948.
