= Chū Kudō =

Japanese adventurer and military officer in Manchukuo (1882–1965)

- 工藤忠
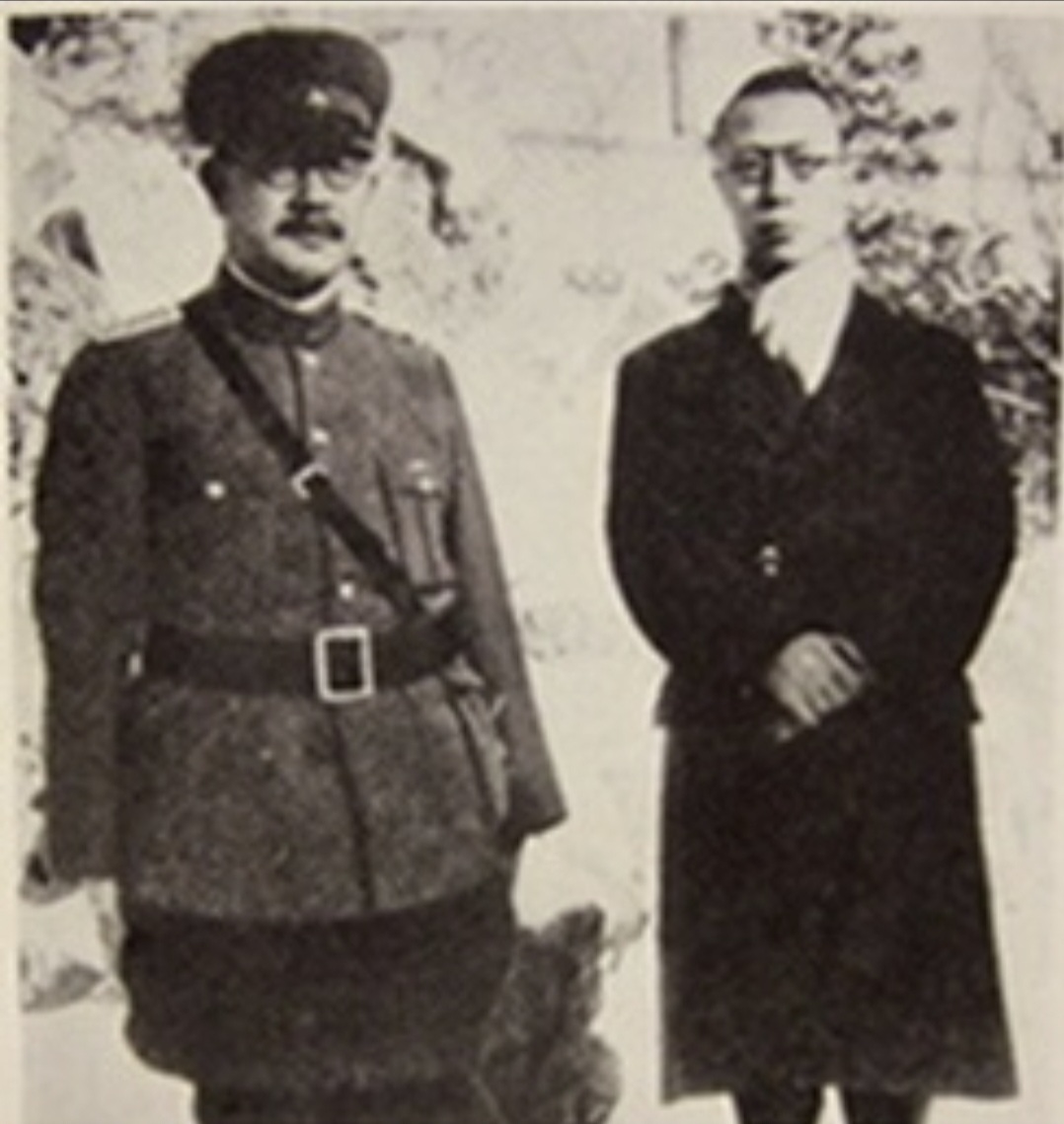
- Kudō (left) with Emperor Puyi
- Born: December 10, 1882; Itayanagi, Kitatsugaru, Aomori
- Died: December 18, 1965 (aged 83)
- Military career
- Allegiance: Manchukuo
- Branch: Manchukuo Imperial Army
- Service years: 1932–1945
- Rank: Lieutenant General

Chū Kudō (工藤忠, Kudō Chū; December 10, 1882 – December 18, 1965), real name Tetsusaburō Kudō (工藤鉄三郎, Kudō Tetsusaburō), was a Japanese continental rōnin and Lieutenant General in the Manchukuo Imperial Army. He served as aide-de-camp and chief of the bodyguard of Emperor Puyi.

== Background ==
Kudō was born in Itayanagi, Kitatsugaru, Aomori as the third son of the wealthy farmer Bun'emon Obata. He had an interest in continental issues, and after graduating from Kinjō Gakuen High School left Japan. After dropping out of a vocational school in 1903, he threw himself into revolutionary movements occurring in China. In his autobiographies, he gave many fanciful accounts of his early life in China, including episodes where he claimed to have walked across the frozen Strait of Tartary in order to join bandits in northern China and to attempt to blow up a warlord operated railway.

Even though he did not have any official military standing, through his contacts with Japanese spymaster Kenji Doihara and Yoshiko Kawashima he entered the Manchukuo Imperial Army as a Lieutenant General in 1932 and served as Chamberlain and Aide-de-camp to the Emperor of Manchukuo. Feeling that a Chinese name would be more appropriate for work in China, Tetsusaburō Kudō consulted with the Manchurian emperor Puyi and received the name Chū (忠).

Always willing to help others from Aomori, his home in Xinjing (present day Changchun) was known as a "rōnin house". In 1942, he held secret meetings with Fumimaro Konoe and others in the upper levels of the Japanese government who hoped to bring a quick end to the Second Sino-Japanese War and an armistice with Kuomintang.

As a high level military officer and imperial official, Kudō always accompanied Puyi and offered advice. While Puyi had the title of emperor, he was only a puppet of the Japanese Kwantung Army. However, the emperor highly trusted Kudō, and in his memoirs "The First Half of My Life" (我的前半生) wrote: "He would always speak at my side. He even expressed to me secret discontent with the Kwantung Army. One time when the color of my tea seemed odd, I was about to have it tested thinking that someone had poisoned it. Kudō took the tea cup and drank it all at once. After I had become Chief Executive, he was the only Japanese to call me 'His Majesty the Emperor', and when he was displeased with the tyrannical Kwantung Army, he told me that he believed that I could restore the name of the Qing dynasty. The loyalty that he displayed would certainly not have paled even to the most model retainers, so gave him the name Chū [Loyal] and treated him like family. He wept with great emotion, and swore to always be loyal until his death."

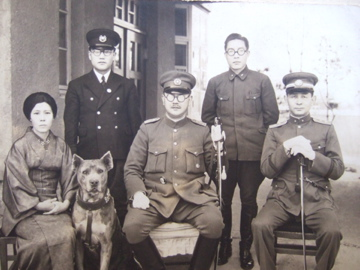
Kudō (seated) with family

On July 26, 2007, Kudō's house where he was raised was opened as a place of historical records. It contains, among many things, clothing of the time and pictures with the Manchukuo emperor.

== Additional References (Japanese) ==
- Akinaga, Yoshirō, Kuroi Rakujitsu. 1965.
- Kudō, Chū, Kōtei Fugi Watashi wa Nihon o Uragitta ka. 1952.
- Kudō, Chū, Kōtei Fugi wa Nani o Kangaeteita ka. 1956.
- Kudō, Tetsuo, Kudō Chū no Shōgai Tairiku ni Inochi o Kaketa Otoko, 1990.
