= Ryōhei Uchida =

Japanese ultra-nationalist, Pan-Asianist, and martial artist

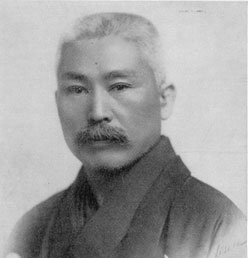
Ryōhei Uchida

Ryōhei Uchida (内田 良平, Uchida Ryōhei; 11 February 1873 – 26 July 1937) was a Japanese ultranationalist political activist, martial artist, and continental rōnin active in the pre-war Empire of Japan.

== Biography ==
Uchida was born in Fukuoka prefecture. He was the son of Shinto Muso-ryu practitioner Uchida Ryōgorō, and from an early age was interested in many forms of Japanese traditional martial arts, including kyūdō, kendo, judo and sumo. In 1893 he entered the Russian language school of the Tōhō Kyōkai and in 1897, made a trip to Siberia.

As a youth, Uchida joined the Genyosha nationalist group, and soon became the leading disciple of its founder, Toyama Mitsuru. The Genyosha was active in raising funds and agitating for a more aggressive foreign policy towards the Asian mainland. When the Donghak Rebellion began in Korea in 1894, he went to Korea to help the rebels.

After his return to Japan, in 1901, he founded the Black Dragon Society, an ultranationalist society which advocated a strong foreign policy towards Russia and Japanese expansionism towards Korea and Manchuria. In 1903, he joined the Tairo Doshikai, a political group advocating war against Russia. Viewing Russia as the primary threat to Japan, he wrote and published a large volume of anti-Russian propaganda, visited Vladivostok to gather intelligence on Russian activities in Asia, and vigorously advocated Japanese expansion into the Amur River Basin as a buffer against Russian aggression. Upon the conclusion of the Russo-Japanese War, Uchida was a leading figure in fomenting violent protests in Tokyo against the Treaty of Portsmouth ending the war, which Uchida felt offered inadequate concessions to Japan.

With Russia having been defeated, Uchida turned his attention towards advocating the annexation of Korea. In 1906, he obtained a position on the staff of Japanese Governor-General of Korea Itō Hirobumi, and used this position to foment unrest and agitate for the full annexation of Korea In 1907, Uchida was one of the sponsors of the pro-Japanese Iljinhoe political party in Korea, and in part thanks to Uchida's efforts, annexation was ultimately achieved in 1910.

As part of the pan-Asianist policies of many in circles around the Black Dragon Society, he was part of an 'Islam Circle' in Meiji politics favouring closer relations with the Islamic world in the 1930s.

During the 1920s and 1930s, Uchida was active in attacking liberalism in Japanese society and politics. He was arrested in 1925 on suspicion of planning the assassination of Japanese Prime Minister Katō Takaaki and the Emperor of Japan, but was acquitted the following year. In 1931, he founded the Greater Japan Production Party (大日本生産党) and became its president, and in 1932, he was rumored to have been one of the masterminds behind the League of Blood Incident. Also in 1932, Uchida would express lamentation towards the Japanese policy towards Korea and China, stating that the two were being mistreated due to the influence of Western utilitarianism overtaking the Yamato spirit.

In 1934, he became the Vice President of the Showa Shinseikai, a national savings-promotion movement closely associated with the Ōmotokyō religious movement.

Uchida died on July 26, 1937.
