= Ujitoshi Konomi =

Japanese sport shooter

Personal information
- Born: 16 December 1912 Fukuoka, Japan
- Died: 5 March 1980 (aged 67) Tokyo, Japan

Sport
- Sport: Sports shooting

Ujitoshi Konomi (16 December 1912 – 5 March 1980) was a Japanese sport shooter who competed in the 1956 Summer Olympics.

Hip hop artist UZI is Konomi's grandson.
