= Black Dragon Society =

Ultranationalist paramilitary group in Japan

- Predecessor: Gen'yōsha
- Formation: 1901; 125 years ago
- Founder: Uchida Ryohei
- Founded at: Japan
- Type: Political
- Location(s): Ethiopia, Turkey, Morocco, throughout Southeast Asia, South America, Europe, and the United States.

Japanese name
- Kanji: 黒龍会
- Hiragana: こくりゅうかい
Transcriptions
- Romanization: Kokuryūkai

The Black Dragon Society (Kyūjitai; 黑龍會; Shinjitai: 黒竜会, Kokuryūkai), or the Amur River Society, was a prominent paramilitary, ultranationalist group in Japan.

== History ==
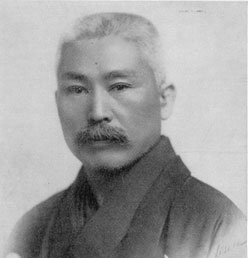
Ryōhei Uchida, founder of the Black Dragon Society

The Kokuryūkai was founded in 1901 by martial artist Uchida Ryohei as a successor to his mentor Mitsuru Tōyama's Gen'yōsha. Its name is derived from the translation of the Amur River, which is called Heilongjiang or "Black Dragon River" in Chinese (黑龍江), read as Kokuryū-kō in Japanese. Its public goal was to support efforts to keep the Russian Empire north of the Amur River and out of East Asia.

The Kokuryūkai initially made strenuous efforts to distance itself from the criminal elements of its predecessor, the Gen'yōsha. As a result, its membership included cabinet ministers and high-ranking military officers as well as professional intelligence operatives. However, as time passed, it found the use of criminal activities to be a convenient means to an end for many of its operations.

The Society published a journal, the Kokuryū Kaiho (Amur Bulletin) and operated an espionage training school, from which it dispatched agents to gather intelligence on Russian activities in Russia, Manchuria, Korea and China. Ikki Kita was sent to China as a special member of the organization. It also pressured Japanese politicians to adopt a strong foreign policy. The Kokuryūkai also supported Pan-Asianism, and lent financial support to revolutionaries such as Sun Yat-sen and Emilio Aguinaldo.

During the Russo-Japanese War, annexation of Korea and Siberian Intervention, the Imperial Japanese Army made use of the Kokuryūkai network for espionage, sabotage and assassination. They organized Manchurian guerrillas against the Russians from the Chinese warlords and bandit chieftains in the region, the most important being Marshal Zhang Zuolin. The Black Dragons waged a very successful psychological warfare campaign in conjunction with the Japanese military, spreading disinformation and propaganda throughout the region. They also acted as interpreters for the Japanese army.

The Kokuryūkai assisted the Japanese spy, Colonel Motojiro Akashi. Akashi, who was not directly a member of the Black Dragons, ran successful operations in China, Manchuria, Siberia and established contacts throughout the Muslim world. These contacts in Central Asia were maintained through World War II. The Black Dragons also formed close contact and even alliances with Buddhist sects throughout Asia.

During the 1920s and 1930s, the Kokuryūkai evolved into more of a mainstream political organization, and publicly attacked liberal and leftist thought. Although it never had more than several dozen members at any one time during this period, the close ties of its membership to leading members of the government, military and powerful business leaders gave it a power and influence far greater than most other ultranationalist groups. In 1924, retired naval captain Yutaro Yano and his associates within the Black Dragon Society invited Oomoto leader Onisaburo Deguchi on a journey to Mongolia. Onisaburo led a group of Oomoto disciples, including Aikido founder Morihei Ueshiba.

Initially directed only against Russia, in the 1930s, the Kokuryūkai expanded its activities around the world, and stationed agents in such diverse places as Ethiopia, Turkey, Morocco, throughout Southeast Asia and South America, as well as Europe and the United States.

The Kokuryūkai was officially disbanded by order of the American Occupation authorities in 1946. According to Brian Daizen Victoria's book, Zen War Stories, the Black Dragon Society was reconstituted in 1961 by Ōmori Sōgen as the Black Dragon Club (Kokuryū-Kurabu) with the aim to "succeed to the spirit of the [prewar] Black Dragon Society and promote the [Shōwa] restoration." According to Victoria, the Kokuryū-Kurabu never attracted more than 150 members.

== Activities in the United States ==
The Ethiopian Pacific Movement and the Peace Movement of Ethiopia (both African-American black nationalist organizations) claimed they were affiliated with the Black Dragon Society.

Mittie Maude Lena Gordon, who led the Peace Movement of Ethiopia, claimed to be personally affiliated with the Kokuryūkai.

On March 27, 1942, FBI agents arrested members of the Black Dragon Society in the San Joaquin Valley, California.

In the Manzanar Internment Camp, a small group of pro-Imperial Japanese flew Black Dragon flags and intimidated other Japanese inmates.

== In popular culture ==
A fictionalized version of the Black Dragon Society "featured in much of American popular culture". It appeared in Master Comics starting with issue 21, first published by Fawcett Comics on December 10, 1941. Initially displayed as an external threat, the Black Dragon Society was given elements of a fifth column after the attack on Pearl Harbor, which reflected the fear of subversion of American society by Japanese-Americans. In DC's All Star Comics from 1942 the Society functioned as an opponent of the Justice Society of America and were likewise presented as an example of "alleged Japanese American perfidy".

Fictionalized portrayals of the Black Dragon Society also appear in the CBS television series Hawaii Five-O and Raven, where they are a ninja clan operating in Hawaii, and in the action film Bloodsport, in which the organization stages a secret martial arts tournament called the Kumite.

== See also ==
- Fifth column
- Kinoaki Matsuo
- G-Men vs. the Black Dragon (1943)
- Kōtarō Yoshida
- Secret society
