= Oka Rokumon =

Japanese sinologist (1833–1914)

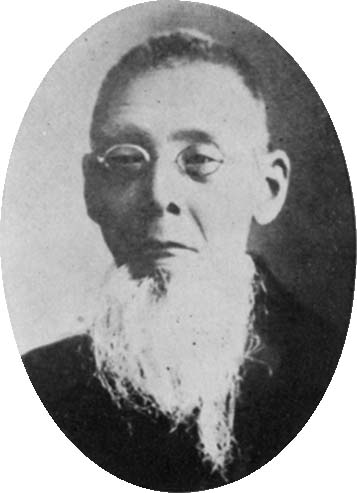
Oka Rokumon

Oka Rokumon (岡 鹿門; 12 December 1833 – 18 February 1914) was a Japanese sinologist (kangakusha) of the late Edo and Meiji periods.

== Biography ==
Oka Rokumon was born on the second day of the eleventh month of Tenpō 4 according to the traditional Japanese calendar (12 December 1833 in the Gregorian calendar). He was born into a buke family in Sendai Domain.

While he was still young he moved to Edo and studied at the Shōhei-kō, an educational institute under the auspices of the shogunate. He eventually became the director (舎長) of the institution. While a student there, he developed close friendships with several of his classmates, notably Shigeno Yasutsugu, Matsumoto Keidō, Matsubayashi Hanzan and Nanma Tsunanori.

In late 1861, he travelled to Kinki, and while there, to help Keidō (who was not receiving a government salary), planned with Hanzan to establish a school in Osaka. They called the school Sōshōkō-juku (双松岡塾), literally "Two Matsus and Oka School". The school became a meeting place for various figures associated with the sonnō-jōi movement, attracting negative attention from the authorities, and Oka was forced to shut the school down after less than a year.

He was at this time ordered by his superiors in Sendai to perform reconnaissance work in Kyoto (the seat of the emperor and a hotbed of restorationist rebels). During the Boshin War, he opposed the union of the domains of Mutsu and Dewa provinces, drawing the ire of the government, and was imprisoned. Following the Meiji Restoration, he served in various government positions.

After retiring early, he devoted himself to writing. In 1884 he visited China, writing a travel diary recounting his experiences, Kankō kiyū (観光記遊).

He died on 18 February 1914. His grave is in Yūtenji in Meguro, Tokyo.

== Names ==
Rokumon was his art name. His original given name was Tenshaku (天爵), and his courtesy name was Shibun (子文). He went by the name Keisuke (啓助) for a time, and changed his name to Senjin (千仭) and his courtesy name to Shin'i (振衣) at various times.

== Works cited ==
- Andō, Kikuji (1983). "Oka Rokumon". Nihon Koten Bungaku Daijiten 日本古典文学大辞典 (in Japanese). Vol. 1. Tokyo: Iwanami Shoten. pp. 468–469. OCLC 11917421.
