= Oriental Youngmen's Association =

The Oriental Youngmen's Association was founded in Japan in 1900 to facilitate the cultivation of friendship among Japanese, Indian, and other Asian students studying in Japan. It was an early expression of Pan-Asianism.
