= Tōyama Mitsuru =

Japanese activist (1855–1944)

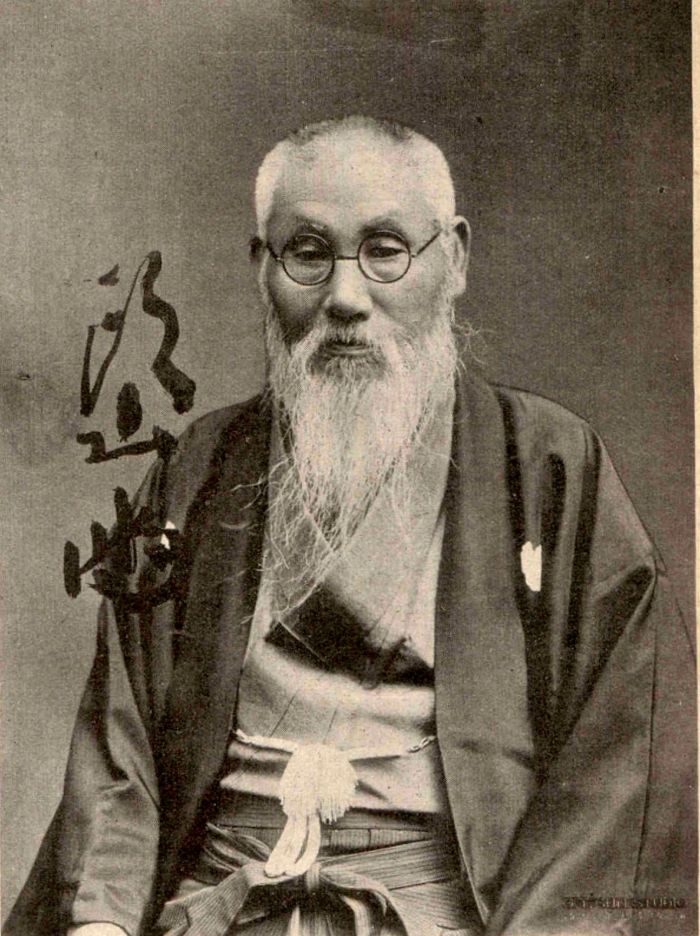
Toyama in 1938

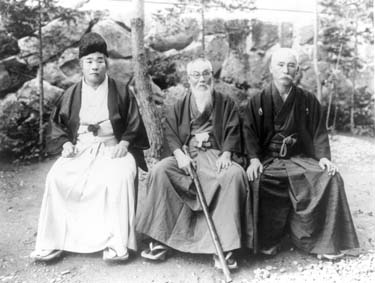
Onisaburo Deguchi, Tōyama Mitsuru & Uchida Ryohei

Tōyama Mitsuru (頭山 満; 27 May 1855 – 5 October 1944) was a Japanese ultranationalist activist who founded the secret societies Genyosha (Black Ocean Society) and Kokuryukai (Black Dragon Society). Tōyama was an anti-communist and a strong proponent of Pan-Asianism.

== Early life ==
Tōyama was born to a poor samurai family in Fukuoka City in Kyūshū. In his youth, he fought in the Saga Rebellion of 1874.

In 1881, Tōyama became one of the founders of the Genyosha, a secret society whose agenda was to agitate for Japanese military expansion and conquest of the Asian continent. The society attracted disaffected ex-samurai, and also figures involved in organized crime to assist in its campaigns of violence and assassination against left-wing politicians. In 1889, Tōyama and the Genyosha were implicated in the attempted assassination of foreign minister Ōkuma Shigenobu.

== Covert government cooperation ==
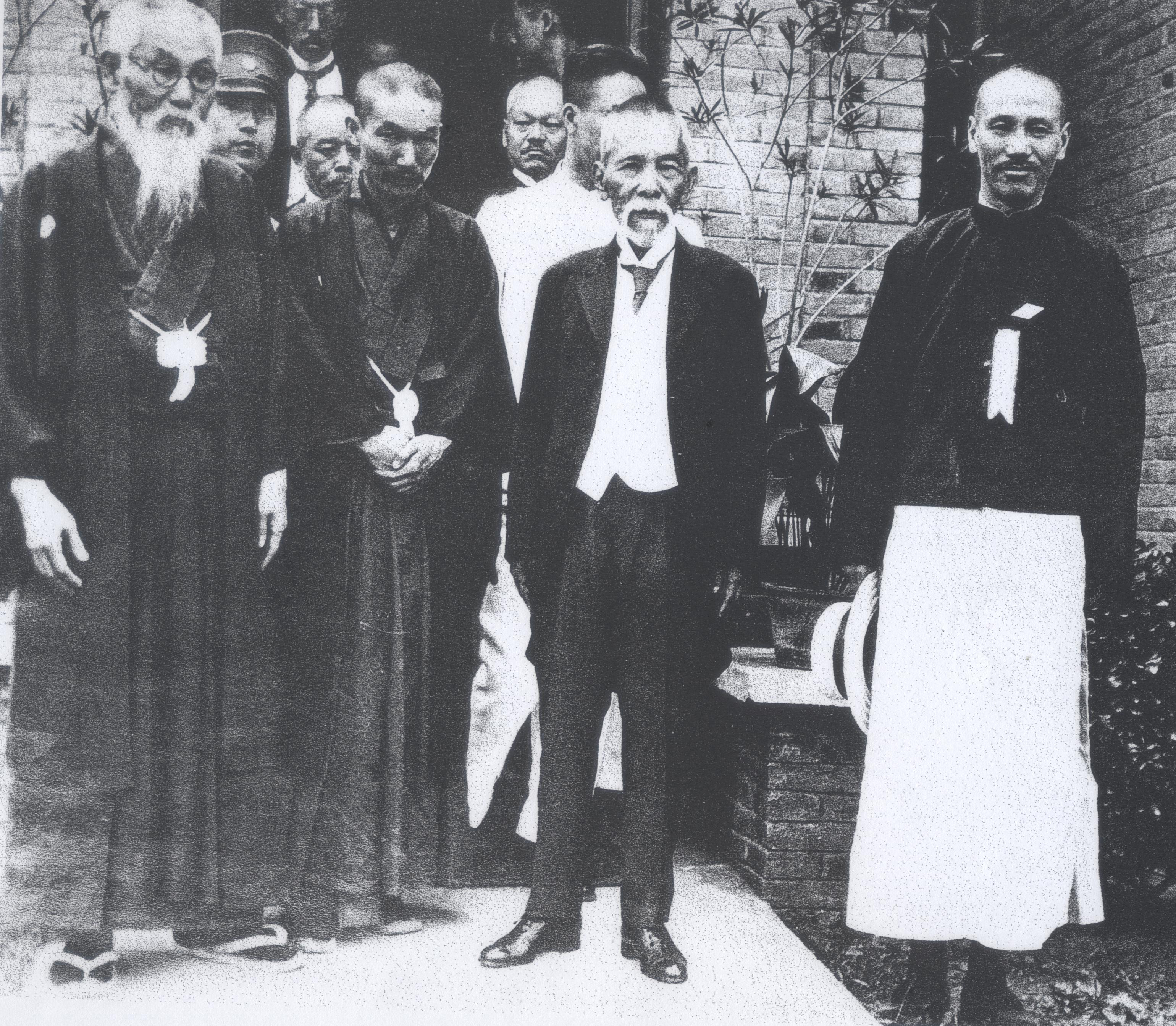
Tōyama (left) with his friends, future Prime Minister Tsuyoshi Inukai (center), future generalissimo of Republic of China Chiang Kai-shek, commander-in-chief of the NRA (right), and others in 1927 when National Revolutionary Army launched Northern Expedition,Chiang Kai-shek required Tōyama and his friend in Japanese government give support to National Revolutionary Army.

Tōyama was both a founder and one-time head of the Black Dragon Society.

Immediately prior to the start of the First Sino-Japanese War, Tōyama organized the Tenyukyo, a secret society and paramilitary force that operated in Korea prior to the arrival of the Imperial Japanese Army, making detailed topographic maps, scouting out Chinese and Korean military installations and deployment, and arranging for logistic support. Along with Genyosha operatives in Korea and Manchuria, the Tenyukyo provided interpreters and guides to the regular Japanese army after their invasion.

Tōyama was a strong supporter of Japanese control over Manchuria and joined forces with the anti-Russian Tairo Doshikai movement in 1903. He also supported the Chinese republican revolutionaries against the Qing dynasty and gave considerable support to Sun Yat-sen. When the 1911 Revolution occurred, he went to China in person as an advisor and to personally oversee Genyosha activities and to provide assistance to Sun Yat-sen.

Following the 1911 Revolution, Tōyama officially retired, and apparently refused to play an active role in the Black Dragon Society (Kokuryu-Kai) that he helped create as a successor to the Genyosha. He remained an influential behind-the-scenes figure in Japanese politics during the following years.

== Influence in nationalist Japan ==
In the 1930s, he was considered as a superpatriot by a large section of the Japanese public, including the military. In 1932, after the assassination of several "liberal" political figures and following rumors that then Premier Saito and others were to be assassinated in turn, the government had Tōyama's house raided and searched, and his son arrested - leading to a momentary pacification of the situation.

== Legacy ==
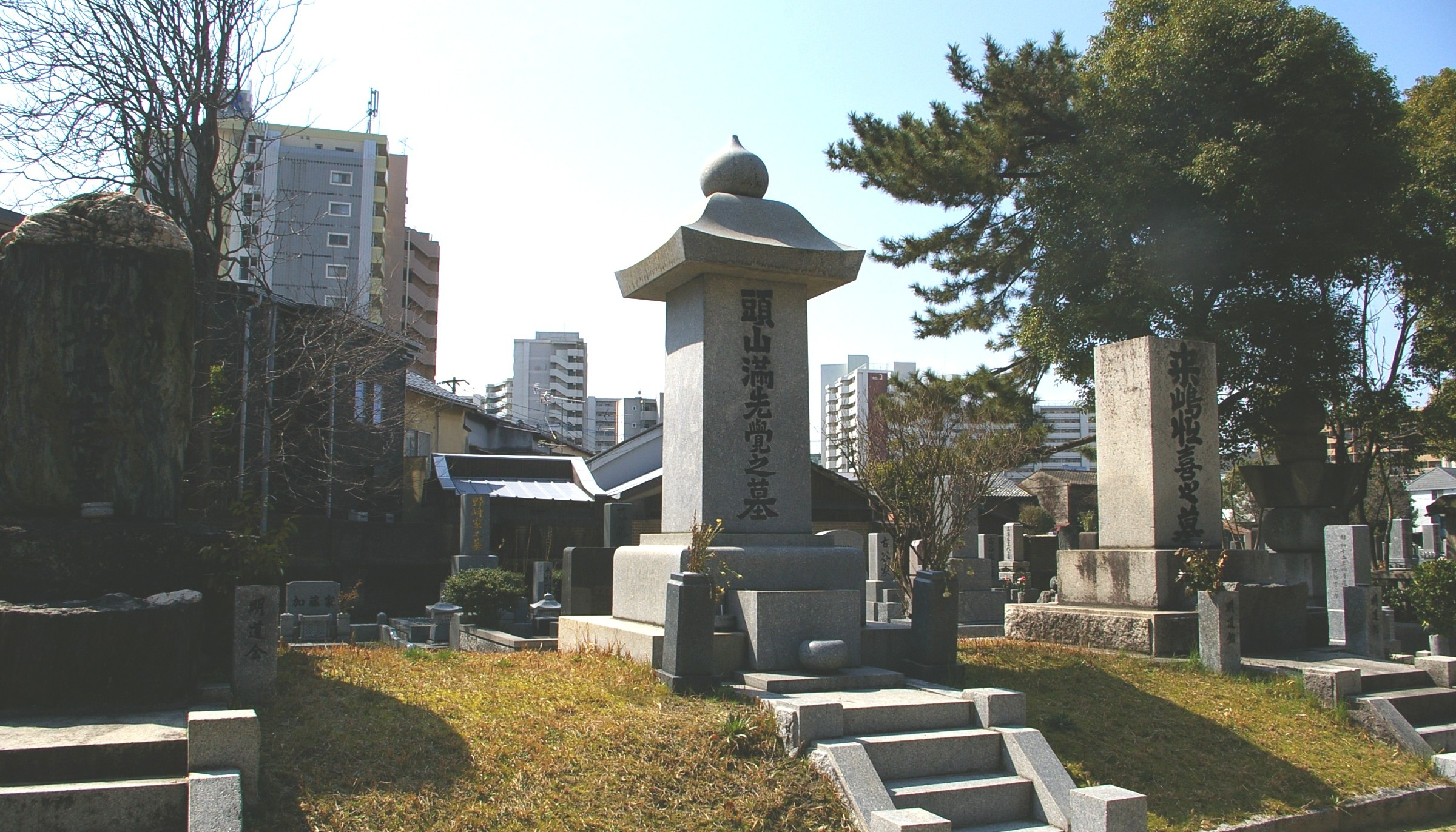
Grave of Toyama Mitsuru in Fukuoka

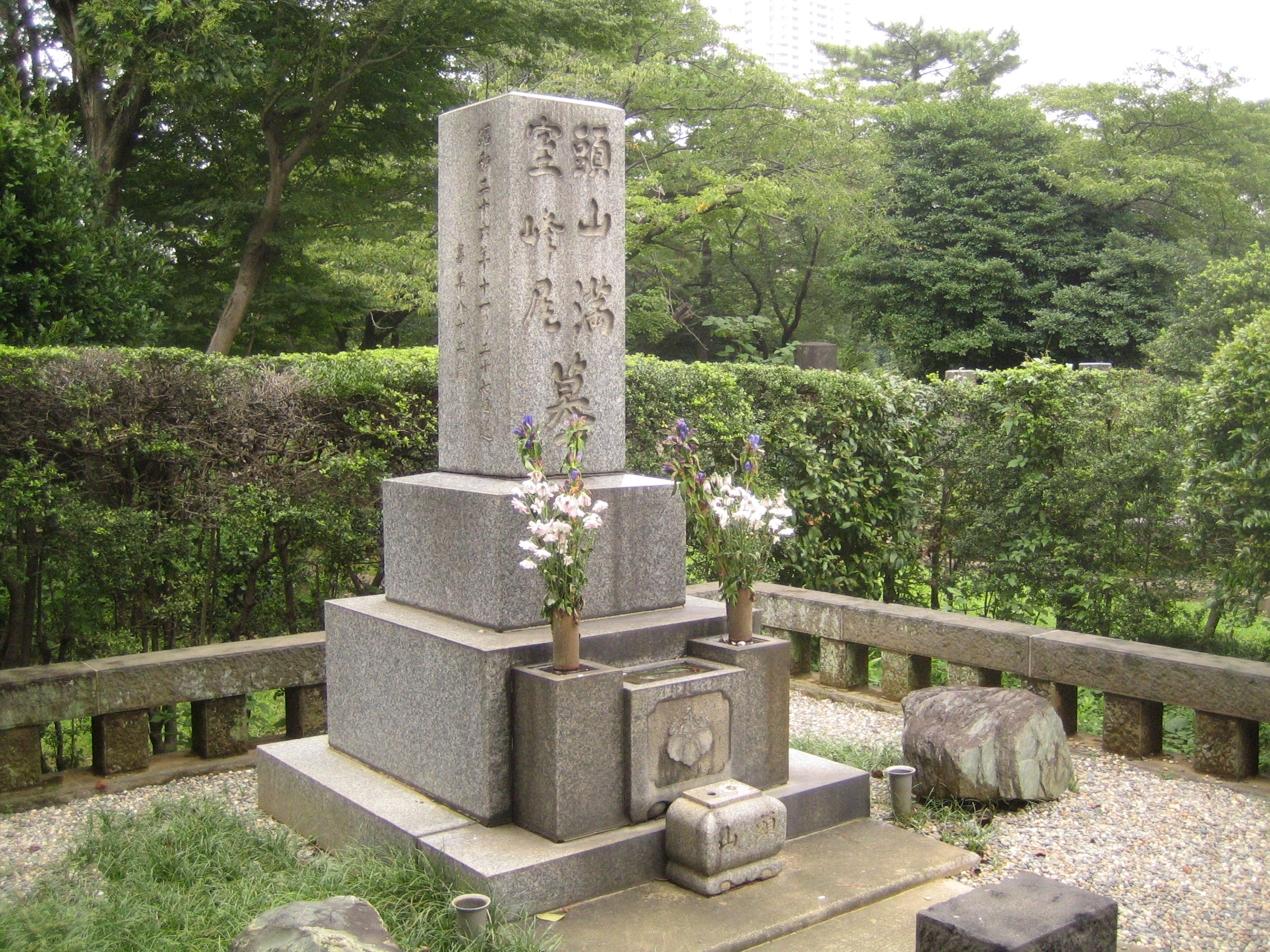
Grave of Toyama Mitsuru and his wife in Tokyo

Although Tōyama remained a private citizen all his life, he was known as the "Shadow Shogun," "Spymaster," and "The Boss of Bosses," because of his tremendous covert influence on the nationalist politics and the yakuza crime syndicates. He also wrote an influential book on the "Three Shu" (Katsu Kaishū, Takahashi Deishū, and Yamaoka Tesshū). Despite his ultranationalism, Tōyama was paradoxically on good terms with Onisaburo Deguchi, Japan's most fervent pacifist. Tōyama was a charismatic, complex, and controversial figure in his lifetime, and remains so to this day.

He died in 1944 at his summer home on Gotemba, Shizuoka Prefecture, at the base of Mount Fuji.

Radio Tokyo announced that funeral services lasting more than three hours were held for him in Tokyo.

== See also ==
- Black Dragon Society

== Sources ==
- Obituary; Oct 6, 1944, The New York Times p. 23
- Joseph C. Grew, Ten years in Japan p. 69 ASIN: B0006ER51M
