= Gen'yōsha =

Influential Pan-Asianist group and secret society active in the Empire of Japan

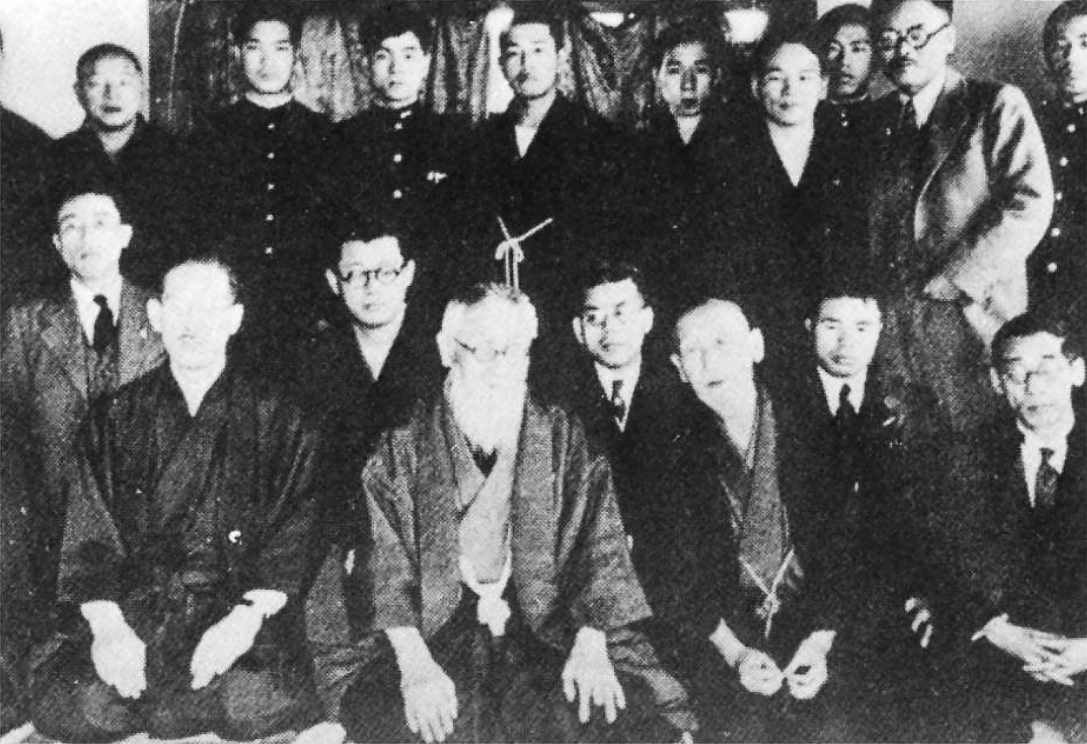
Tōyama Mitsuru (center) and Yoshio Kodama (first row, second from right) among a meeting of the Dark/Black Ocean Society (Gen'yosha), 1929

The Dark/Black Ocean Society (Japanese: 玄洋社, Hepburn: Gen'yōsha) was an influential Pan-Asianist group and secret society active in the Empire of Japan.

== Foundation as the Koyōsha ==
Founded as the Koyōsha by Hiraoka Kotarō (1851–1906), a wealthy ex-samurai and mine-owner, with mining interests in Manchuria, Tōyama Mitsuru, and other former samurai of the Fukuoka Domain, it agitated for a return to the old feudal Japanese order with special privileges and government stipends for the samurai class.^{:215} The Koyōsha participated in the various ex-samurai uprisings in Kyūshū against the early Meiji government, but after the suppression of the Satsuma Rebellion in 1877, it abandoned its original goals, joined the pro-democracy Freedom and People's Rights Movement, and formed a political organization to agitate for a national parliament instead.

== Foundation as the Gen'yōsha ==
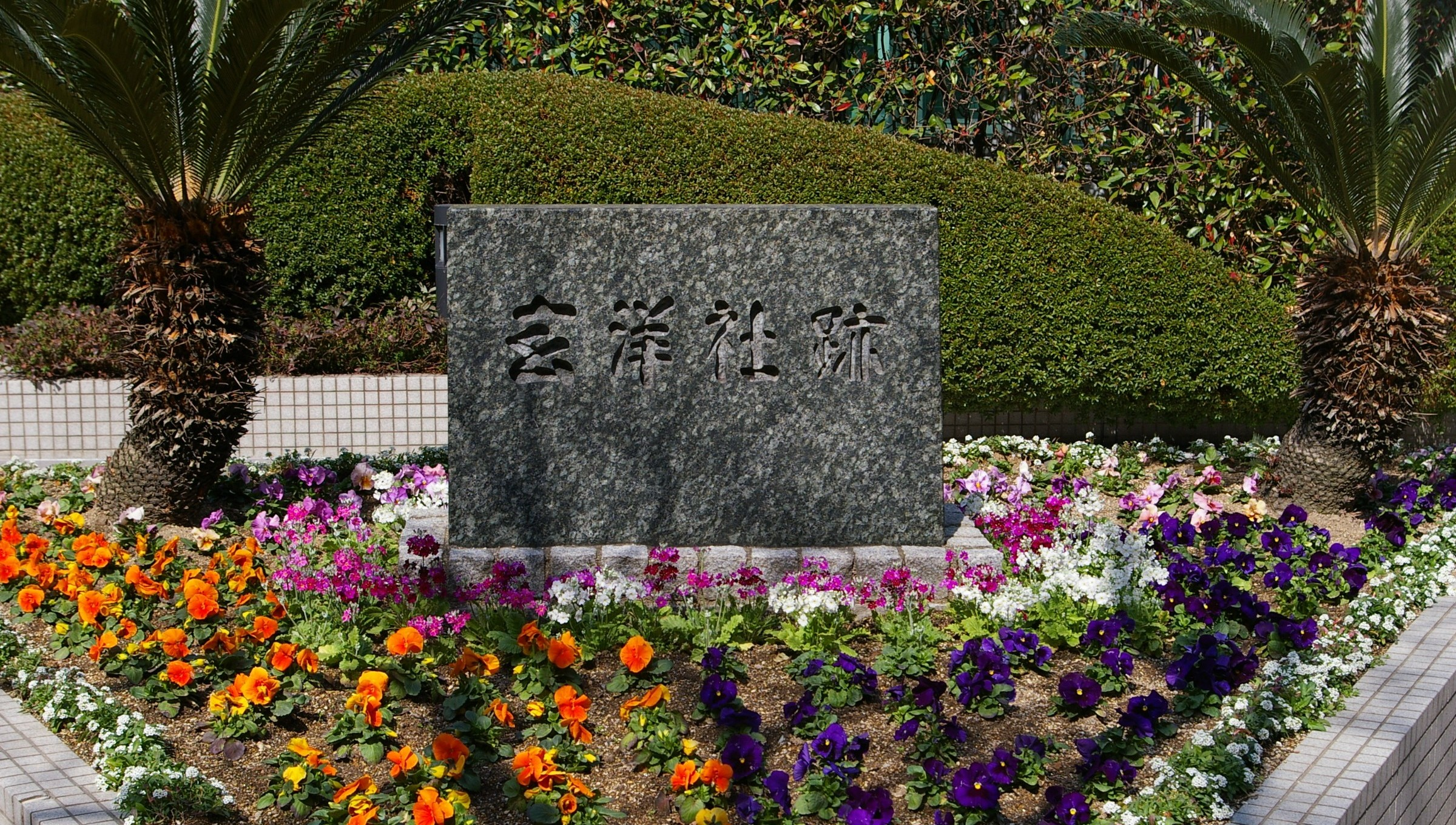
A Gen'yōsha memorial

In 1881, the Koyōsha changed its direction again. The February 1881 founding charter of the Gen'yōsha described its ideals as (1) respect the imperial house (2) love your home region and (3) firmly defend and protect the people's rights. However, its true agenda was to agitate for Japanese military expansion and conquest of the Asian continent. The true agenda was reflected in its new name of Gen'yōsha, taken after the Genkainada strait which separates Japan from Korea.

The tactics which the Gen'yōsha was prepared to use to achieve its goals were also far from peaceful. It began as a terrorist organization, and although it continued to recruit disaffected ex-samurai, it also attracted figures involved in organized crime to assist in its campaigns of violence and assassination against foreigners and liberal politicians.^{:217}

The Gen'yōsha was a major force in the Freedom and People's Rights Movement. During the 1885 Osaka incident, the Gen'yōsha and several other Freedom and People's Rights Movement groups simultaneously attempted to overthrow the Meiji oligarchs in uprisings inside Japan, China, and Korea.

In 1889, the Gen'yōsha strongly criticized the unequal treaty revision plan drafted by foreign minister Ōkuma Shigenobu. Gen'yōsha militant Kurushima Tsuneki attempted to kill Ōkuma by throwing a bomb under his carriage. After the bomb detonated, and apparently believing he had succeeded, Kurushima bowed and killed himself by stabbing himself twice in the neck. Ōkuma survived, and his left leg was amputated at the hip following two operations.

In the election of 1892, the Gen'yōsha mounted a campaign of intimidation and violence with the tacit support of the Matsukata administration to influence the outcome of the election.

One of the primary targets of the Gen'yōsha were the many Chinese secret societies, some of which were very hostile to Japan. However, the Chinese secret societies had a shared goal with the Gen'yōsha in wanting the overthrow of the Qing dynasty. In 1881, Mitsuru Tōyama sent over 100 men into China to gather information and to infiltrate these secret societies. One of the first and most detailed histories of the secret societies was written by Gen'yōsha member Hiraya Amane, who assisted in the establishment of the Gen'yōsha's Chinese headquarters in Hangzhou.

The Gen'yōsha not only provided funds and weapons to the secret societies, but also arranged for refuge in Japan for leaders targeted by the Qing government. The Gen'yosha established a large network of brothels across China (and later throughout Southeast Asia) to provide meeting locations, and also to gather information. In addition to being a profitable side-business, the brothels provided opportunities to gather useful information for the later blackmail or subversion of patrons. However, although blackmail and bribery were often resorted to, more often information was obtained by employing prostitutes highly skilled in extracting information from their clients. The Gen'yōsha even established a training school for such agents in Sapporo in Hokkaidō.

Another sphere of Gen'yōsha activity was Korea. The Gen'yōsha established a task force to prepare detailed topographical survey maps of Korea in secret, in anticipation of a future Japanese invasion. The Gen'yōsha also actively supported the Donghak Peasant Movement, knowing that the uprising was likely to draw China and Japan into a war. The assassination of Queen Min of Korea in 1895 is believed to have been conducted by Gen'yosha members, at the instigation of the Japanese Minister in Seoul, Miura Gorō.

Originally ignored by the Japanese military, during the First Sino-Japanese War and Russo-Japanese War, both the Imperial Japanese Army and Imperial Japanese Navy found the Gen'yōsha's extensive intelligence gathering network throughout East Asia to be invaluable. The Gen'yōsha network was also useful for the military in conducting sabotage activities behind enemy lines.

After the annexation of Korea in 1910, the Gen'yōsha continued to support efforts towards Pan-Asianism. Domestically, it formed a political party called the Dai Nippon Seisantō ("Greater Japan Production Party") to combat the influence of communism and socialism in worker trade unions.

Towards its later years, the Gen'yōsha was far removed from its origins as a secret society, but had evolved almost to the mainstream of Japanese politics. A number of cabinet ministers and members of the Japanese Diet were known members, and mainstream political leaders, such as Hirota Kōki and Nakano Seigō emerged from its ranks. It continued to exert considerable influence on the politics and foreign policy of Japan until the end of World War II.

The Gen'yōsha was disbanded by the American authorities during the Occupation of Japan.

== Nationalism ==
The primary English-language text on the Gen'yōsha presents the group as ultranationalistic. Academic Mark W. Driscoll writes that even that text recognizes that the Gen'yōsha did not want Emperor Meiji's power to expand and in 1881 the organization's position was simply that the imperial household should be respected. Writing in 1935, Yumeno Kyūsaku stated that the early Gen'yōsha was not nationalistic.

The Gen'yōsha was considered to be an ultranationalist group by General Headquarters in the International Military Tribunal for the Far East.

== Legacy ==
The Gen'yōsha was the forerunner of a number of organizations which inherited and developed its ideology. It also set the stage for the post-World War II ties between right-wing politicians and yakuza organized crime syndicates.

Although modern yakuza share many of Gen'yōsha's political and social philosophies, and although many of Gen'yōsha's members were drawn from yakuza ranks, the Gen'yōsha was primarily a political organization that often used criminal means to attain its goals, and was not a yakuza group itself, as some authors have claimed.

== In popular fiction ==
Part of its role in Korean history (and its methods for gathering information) is fictionalised in the 2018 South Korean TV series, Mr Sunshine.

== See also ==
- Black Dragon Society
- Cherry Blossom Society
- Proto-fascism

== Bibliography ==
- Min, Anchee (2003). The Last Empress. Boston: Houghton Mifflin. ISBN 0618531467.
- Gordon, Andrew (2003). A Modern History of Japan: From Tokugawa Times to the Present. Oxford: Oxford University Press. ISBN 0195110617.
- Jacob, Frank (2012). Die Thule-Gesellschaft und die Kokuryûkai: Geheimgesellschaften im global-historischen Vergleich. Würzburg: Königshausen & Neumann. ISBN 978-3826049095.
- Victor, George (2005). The Pearl Harbor Myth, Rethinking the Unthinkable. Lincoln, Nebraska: Potomac Books. ISBN 1597970425.
- Crowdey, George (2006). The Enemy Within, A History of Espionage. Oxford: Osprey Publishing. ISBN 1841769339.
