= Pan-Asianism =

Ideology that promotes Asian unity

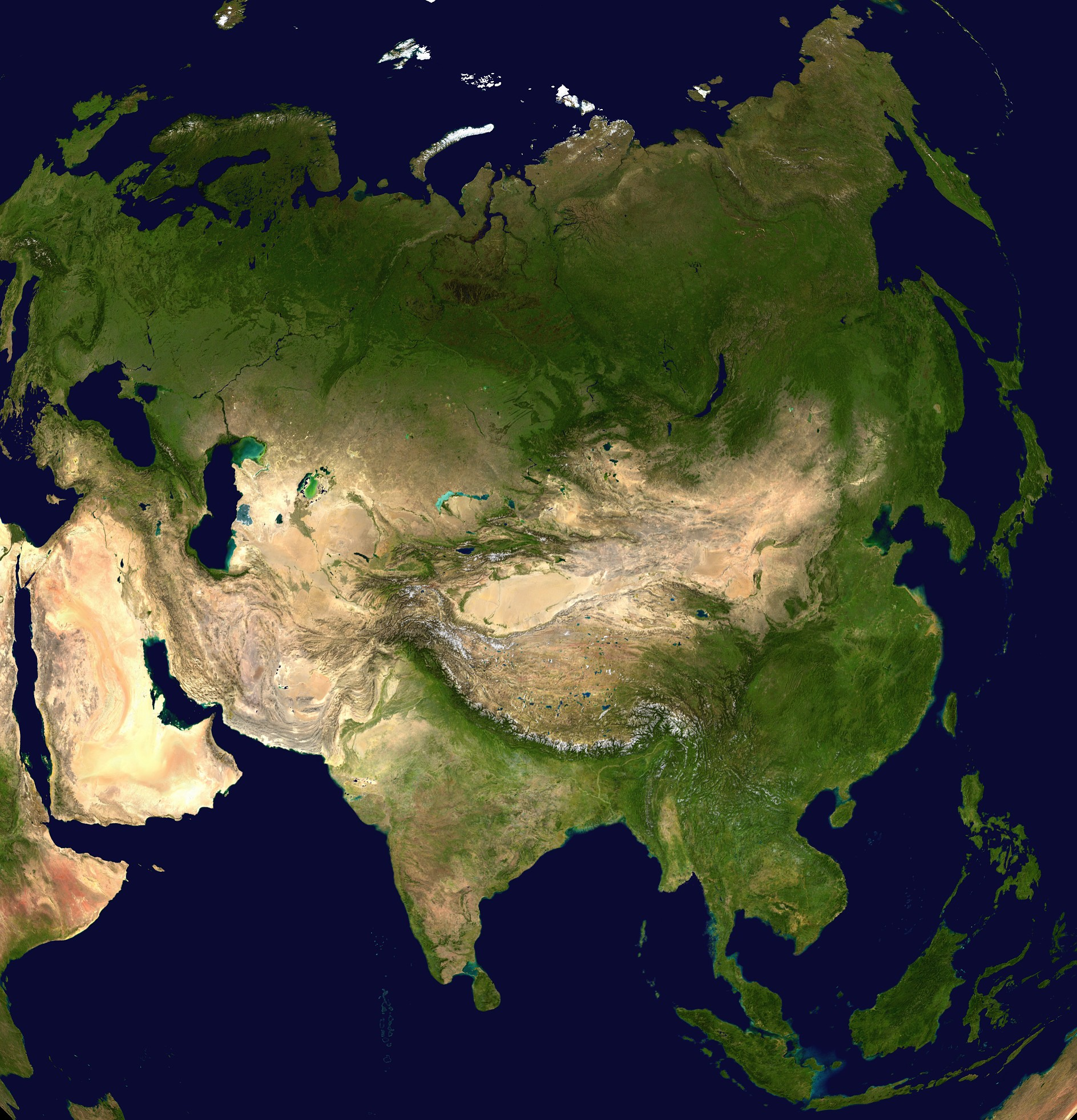
Satellite photograph of Asia in orthographic projection.

Pan-Asianism (also known as Asianism or Greater Asianism) is an ideology and movement aimed at creating a political and economic unity among Asian peoples. Various theories and movements of Pan-Asianism have been proposed, particularly from East, South and Southeast Asia. The threats of Western imperialism and colonialism prompted deliberation on the definition of Asia, which developed into the ideology and movement of Pan-Asianism.

The concept of Asianism in Japan and China has changed during the early 20th century from a foreign-imposed and negatively received, to a self-referential and embraced concept, according to historian Torsten Weber.

== Japanese Pan-Asianism ==
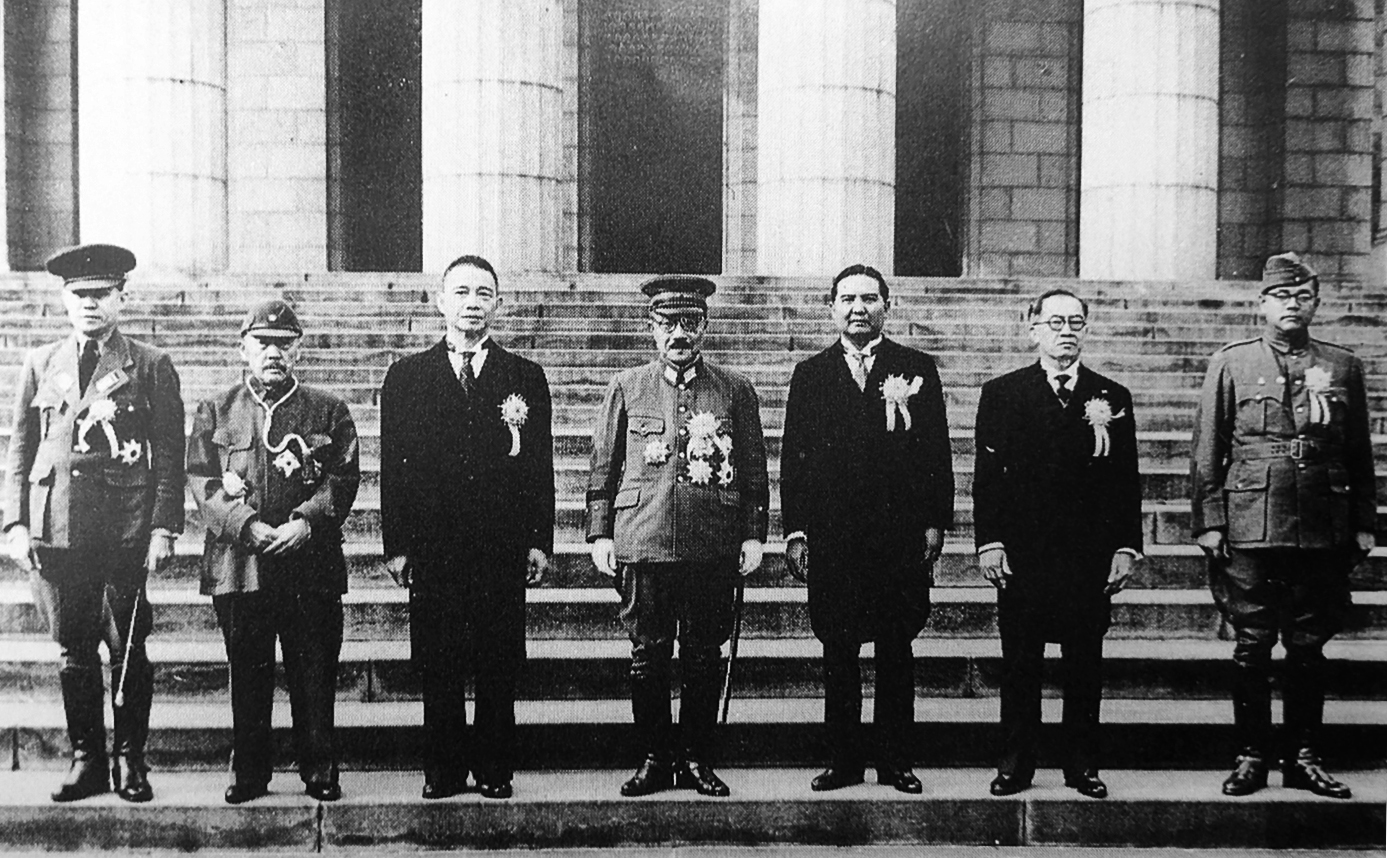
Greater East Asia Conference in November 1943, the participants were (L–R): Ba Maw, representative of Burma, Zhang Jinghui, representative of Manchukuo, Wang Jingwei, representative of China, Hideki Tōjō, representative of Japan, Wan Waithayakon, representative of Thailand, José P. Laurel, representative of the Philippines, Subhas Chandra Bose, representative of India

Japanese Pan-Asianism includes East Asia, Southeast Asia, South Asia, and Oceania.

The concept of a unified Asia under Japanese leadership had its roots dating back to the 16th century. For example, Toyotomi Hideyoshi proposed to make China, Korea, and Japan into "one". Moreover, Hideyoshi had further planned to expand into India, the Philippines, and other islands in the Pacific.

Originally, Japanese Pan-Asianism believed that Asians shared a common heritage and must therefore collaborate in defeating their Western colonial masters. However, Japanese Asianism mostly focused on East Asian territories, with occasional references to South East Asia and West Asia.

The first lasting pan-Asianist organisation started in Japan. In 1877, inspired by Ōkubo Toshimichi's promise to Chinese statesman Li Hongzhang to promote Chinese-language schools in Japan as a channel of mutual understanding, a Pan-Asianist body was established in Japan known as Shin'akai (Promoting Asia Society), followed by the more successful Kōakai (Raising Asia Society) in 1880. Both focused on the promotion of mutual understanding through providing language education, setting up schools in Japan for teaching Chinese and Korean languages, as well as branches in Korean and Chinese cities. China's envoys to Japan and Korean reformers held membership, and even two diplomats from the Ottoman Empire. The Society used Classical Chinese as the common language of East Asian Pan-Asianists. Japanese Pan-Asianism before 1895 was characterized by an egalitarian view on relations between China, Korea and Japan; in order to avoid the accusation that Japan sought to 'lead' Asia, the Kōakai changed its name to the "Asia Association."

Pan-Asianist ideologues included Tokichi Tarui (1850–1922) who argued for equal Japan-Korea unionization for cooperative defence against the European powers, and Kentaro Oi (1843–1922) who attempted to push social reforms in Korea and establish a constitutional government in Japan. Pan-Asian thought in Japan was further popularized following the defeat of Russia in the Russo-Japanese War (1904–1905). This sparked interest from Indian poets Rabindranath Tagore and Sri Aurobindo and Chinese politician Sun Yat-sen.

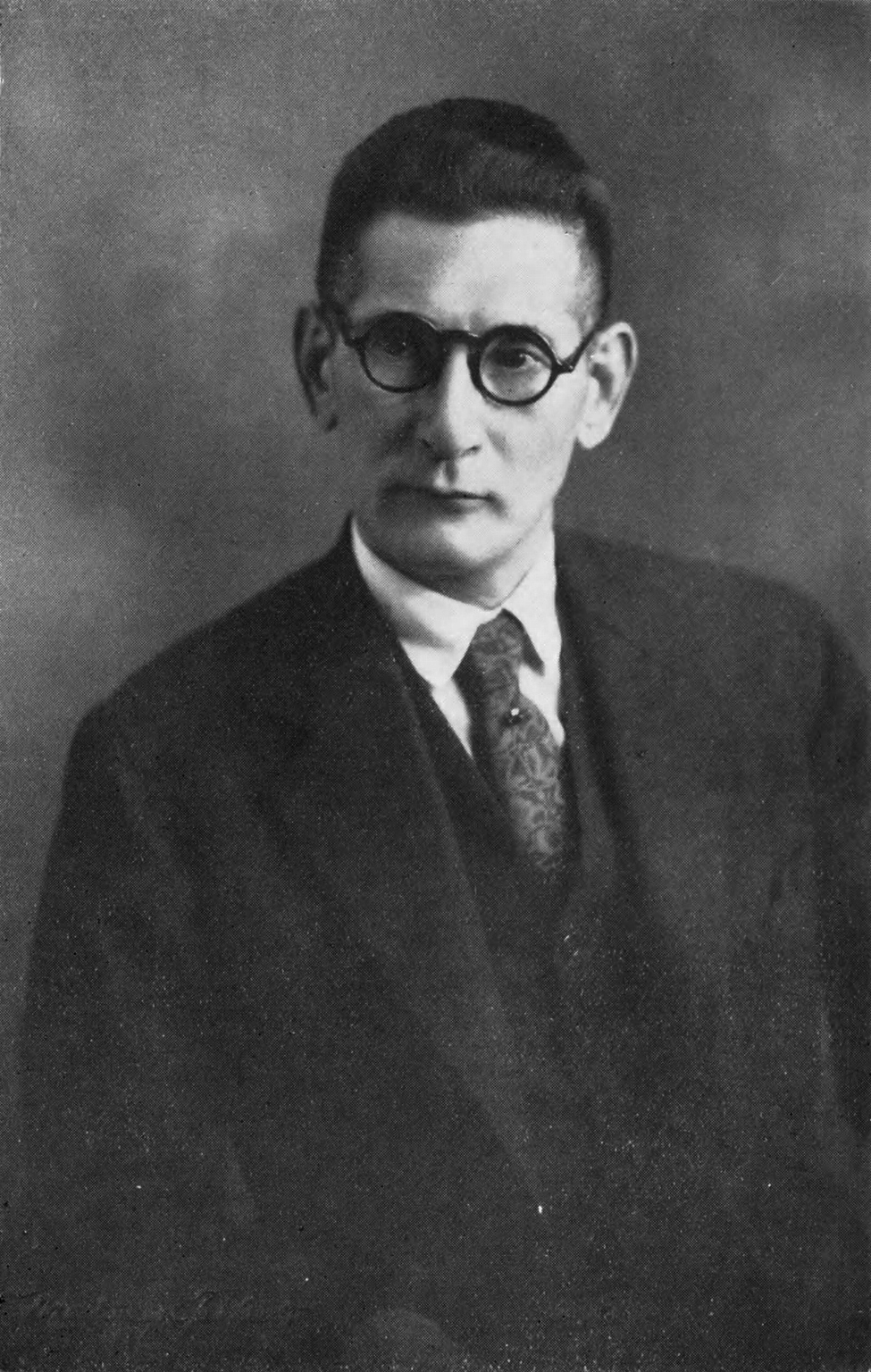
Japanese Pan-Asian writer Shūmei Ōkawa

The growing official interest in broader Asian concerns was shown in the establishment of facilities for Indian Studies. In 1899, Tokyo Imperial University set up a chair in Sanskrit and Kawi, with a further chair in comparative religion being set up in 1903. In this environment, a number of Indian students came to Japan in the early twentieth century, founding the Oriental Youngmen's Association in 1900. Their anti-British political activity caused consternation to the Indian Government, following a report in the London Spectator.

Okakura Kakuzō, a scholar and art critic, also praised the superiority of Asian values upon Japanese victory of the Russo-Japanese War:

The Himalayas divide, only to accentuate, two mighty civilisations, the Chinese with its communism of Confucius, and the Indian with its individualism of the Vedas. But not even the snowy barriers can interrupt for one moment that broad expanse of love for the Ultimate and Universal, which is the common thought-inheritance of every Asiatic race, enabling them to produce all the great religions of the world, and distinguishing them from those maritime peoples of the Mediterranean and the Baltic, who love to dwell on the Particular, and to search out the means, not the end, of life.

In this, Kakuzō was utilising the Japanese concept of sangoku, which existed in Japanese culture before the concept of Asia became popularised. Sangoku literally means the "three countries": Honshu (the largest island of Japan), Kara (China) and Tenjiku (India).

However, Japanese Pan-Asianism evolved into a more nationalist ideology that prioritized Japan's interests. This was evident by the growth of secret societies such as Black Ocean Society and the Black Dragon Society, which committed criminal activities to ensure the success of Japanese expansionism. Exceptionally, Ryōhei Uchida (1874–1937), who was a member of the Black Dragon Society, was a Japan-Korea unionist and supported Filipino and Chinese revolutions. In addition, Asian territories were seen as reservoirs of economic resources and outlets for the Emperor's "glory" to be displayed. These were evident in government policies such as the Hakkō ichiu and Greater East Asia Co-Prosperity Sphere agendas. Even Kakuzō was critical of Japan's expansionism after the Russo-Japanese War, viewing it as no different than Western expansionism. He expected other Asians to call them "embodiments of the White Disaster".

Historian Torsten Weber compares these contradictions to the Monroe Doctrine, which opposed European imperialism to foster the unimpeded growth of American imperialism.

Japanese pan-Asianism had strong connections to pan-Islamist circles in a mutual anti-Western frame work from the early 20th century, with the Japanese being seen as key force against Western imperialism after the Russo-Japanese War. Key figures in this include Russian Tatar Abdürreshid Ibrahim and Japanese figures like Hasan Hatano Uho. It included advocacy groups and papers, such as the Agia Gikai.

== Chinese Pan-Asianism ==
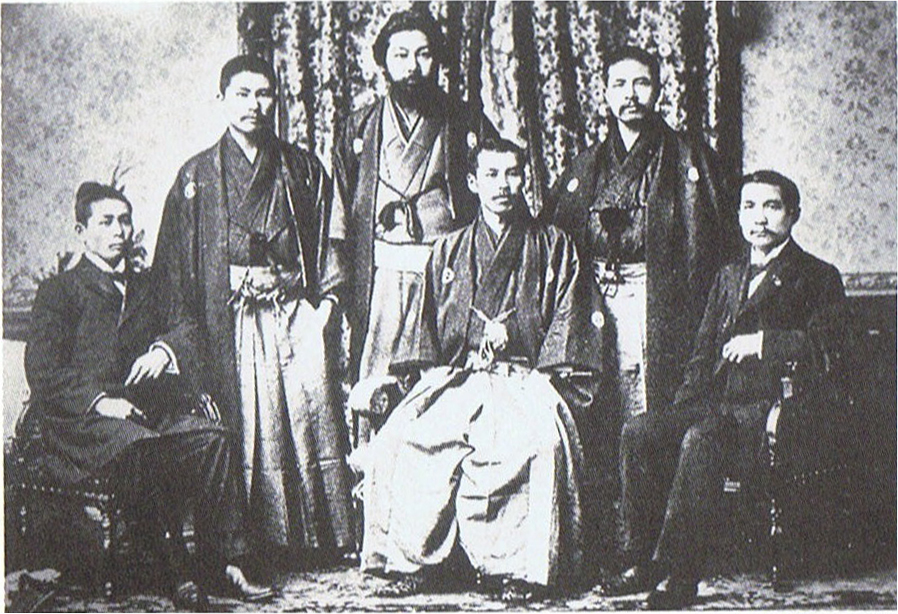
Sun Yat-sen with friends in Japan, 1897. Sun had close relations with numerous Japanese pan-Asianists throughout his life.

First president of the Republic of China Sun Yat-sen was a proponent of Pan-Asianism. He said that Asia was the "cradle of the world's oldest civilisation" and that "even the ancient civilisations of the West, of Greece and Rome, had their origins on Asiatic soil." He thought that it was only in recent times that Asians "gradually degenerated and become weak." Sun Yat-sen considered Japan and China to be both members of the "Yellow race" and equally threatened from imperialists, and urged Japan to assist China in repealing the Unequal Treaties. In the Russo-Japanese War, Sun had interpreted the Japanese victory as a victory for Asians; as early as 1913, he had attempted to form a pan-Asian alliance with Japanese Prime Minister Katsura Tarō to counter Anglo-Saxon and French imperialism, which he considered to be the principal threats in the world. For Sun, "Pan-Asianism is based on the principle of the Rule of Right, and justifies the avenging of wrongs done to others." He advocated overthrowing the Western "Rule of Might" and "seeking a civilisation of peace and equality and the emancipation of all races." Sun, despite his consistent praise of Japan as a cultural partner, questioned whether they would follow the path of exploitation like Western powers in the future in his final years.

From a Chinese perspective, Japanese Pan-Asianism was interpreted as a competing ideology to Sinocentrism as well as rationalization of Japanese imperialism (cf. Twenty-One Demands). Li Dazhao, for example, contended that Japanese Pan-Asianism amounted to an Asian Monroe Doctrine based on Japanese imperialism and aggression. Li advocated for a Pan-Asianism based on national self-determination and resistance to Japan. As part of Chinese advocacy of Pan-Asianism, a Chinese delegate to the League of Nations proposed that the League's central Council should have at least one representative from Asia; the League incorporated this idea into a 1922 rule requiring that nonpermanent members of the central Council be selected with due consideration for the geographical divisions of the world and ethnic and cultural factors.

Nonetheless, Chinese Pan-Asianism emerged and was equally as self-centered as its Japanese counterpart. Its success was limited by China's political instability and weak international status.

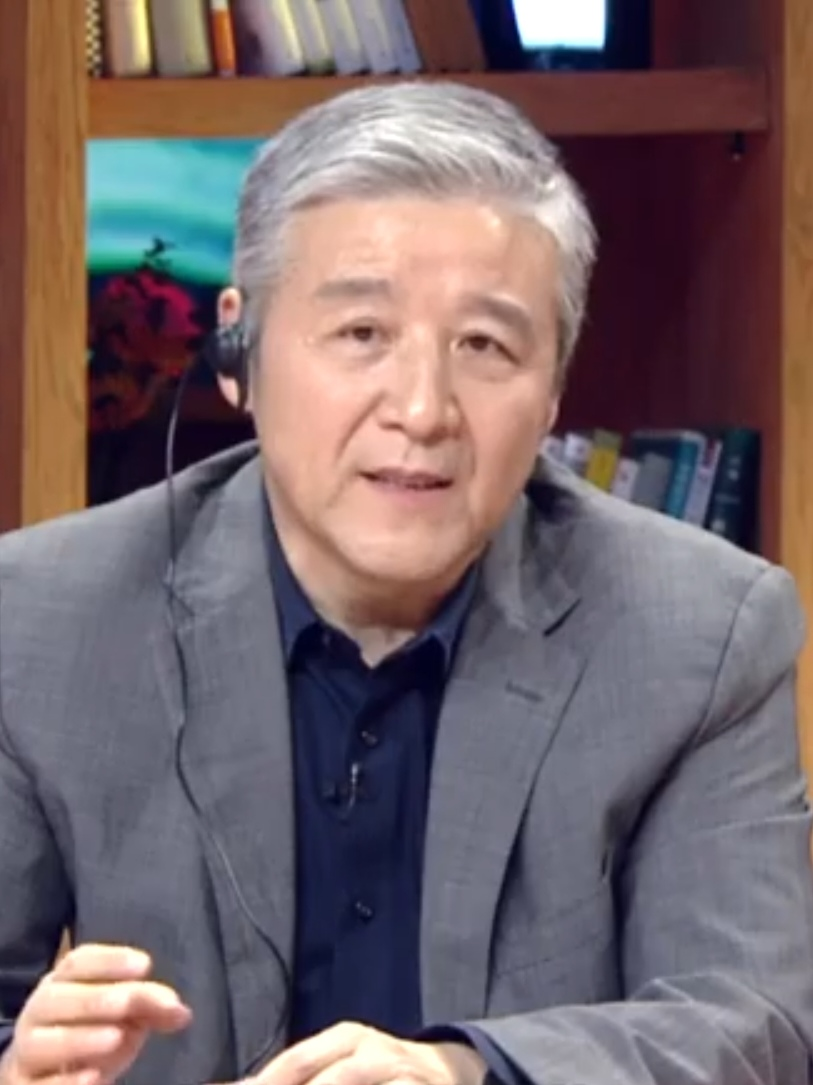
Chinese Pan-Asian thinker Wang Hui

Since the 2000s, Chinese scholars have a more nuanced view of Pan-Asianism, especially those of the Japanese variety. Historian Wang Ping proposed an evaluation system based on chronology: co-operative Classical Asianism (until 1898), expansive Greater Asianism (until 1928), and the invasive Japanese ‘Greater East Asia Co-Prosperity Sphere’ (until 1945).

Slovenian philosopher Slavoj Žižek stated that China has been following pan-Asianism for over a century. He regarded Chinese thinker Wang Hui as the main promoter of a communist pan-Asianism. Wang Hui advocated that if social democracy is grounded in Asian civilizational traditions, it renders it possible to avoid the Western type of multi-party democracy and enact a social order with much stronger people's participation.

== Indian Pan-Asianism ==
Ties between British India and Japan were pursued by some as a way of pushing against British rule, with revolutionaries such as Subhas Chandra Bose meeting with Japanese leaders, though British intelligence services sought to limit these interactions.

The 1951 founding of the Asian Games, now the second-largest sporting event behind the Olympic Games, was partially inspired by a newly independent India's vision for Asian solidarity and the emergence of the post-colonial world order. However, Indian pan-Asianism faded away after the fallout of the 1962 India-China War.

== Turkish Pan-Asianism ==
Pan-Asianism in Turkey has not yet been fully explored, it is not known how many people hold this ideology and how widespread it is. However, Turks who supported Japan in the Second World War and have the Pan-Asianism ideology use a redesigned Turkish flag based on Japan's flag in the Second World War.

== Pan-Asianism and Asian values ==
The idea of "Asian values" is somewhat of a resurgence of Pan-Asianism. One foremost enthusiast of the idea was the former Prime Minister of Singapore, Lee Kuan Yew. In India, Ram Manohar Lohia dreamed of a united socialist Asia. A number of other Asian political leaders from Sun Yat-sen in the 1910s and 20s to Mahathir Mohamad in the 1990s similarly argue that the political models and ideologies of Europe lack values and concepts found in Asian societies and philosophies.

== See also ==
- Afro-Asia
  - Bandung Conference (1955)
- Asiacentrism
- ASEAN (1967 to the present)
  - History of ASEAN
- Asia Cooperation Dialogue
- Asia Council
- Asian Development Bank
- Asian Infrastructure Investment Bank
- Asian Monetary Fund
- Asian Relations Conference
- Belt and Road Initiative
- East Asian Community
- Fusao Hayashi
- Greater East Asia Conference
- Greater East Asia Co-Prosperity Sphere
- Greater Europe, a similar movement in Europe
- Iwane Matsui
- Pan-Asianists
- Pan-Europeanism
- Pan-nationalism
- Regional Comprehensive Economic Partnership
- Shumei Okawa
- South Asian Association for Regional Cooperation

== Bibliography ==
- Saaler, Sven and J. Victor Koschmann, eds., Pan-Asianism in Modern Japanese History: Colonialism, Regionalism and Borders. London and New York: Routledge, 2007. ISBN 0-415-37216-X
- Saaler, Sven and C.W.A. Szpilman, eds., Pan-Asianism: A Documentary History, Rowman & Littlefield, 2011. two volumes (1850–1920, 1920–present).ISBN 978-1-4422-0596-3 (vol. 1), ISBN 978-1-4422-0599-4 (vol. 2)
- Szpilman, Christopher W. A. (2017). "Japan and Asia". In Saaler, Sven (ed.). Routledge Handbook of Modern Japanese History. pp. 25–46. doi:10.4324/9781315746678-3. ISBN 978-1-315-74667-8.
- Turnbull, Stephen (2008), The Samurai Invasion of Korea 1592–98, Osprey Publishing Ltd, ISBN 9781846032547, OCLC 244583893
