= Kanokogi Kazunobu =

Japanese philosopher (1884–1949)

- 鹿子木員信
- Born: 3 November 1884
- Died: 23 December 1949 (aged 65)
- Citizenship: Japanese
- Education: Union Theological Seminary; University of Jena
- Occupation: Author
- Notable work: Der Geist Japans
- Spouse: Cornelia Zieliński
- Children: Takehiko Kanagoki

Kanokogi Kazunobu (鹿子木員信, 1884–1949) was a Japanese professor, philosopher, mountaineer and author. Although less well known than Ikki Kita, Kanokogi has been referred to on several occasions as "the pioneer of Japanese totalitarianism."

After training as a naval engineer, he saw combat in the Russo-Japanese War; after converting to Christianity he resigned his commission and travelled to the United States to study theology at Union Theological Seminary and philosophy at Columbia University.

He received his doctorate (supervised by Rudolf Eucken) while studying in Germany at the University of Jena. After returning to Japan in 1912 he taught at Keio University, Tokyo Imperial University and Kyushu Imperial University. Kanokogi became involved in the Pan-Asianism movement, which led to him travelling to India. He was arrested by the British in Calcutta, and deported to Singapore, where he was imprisoned briefly. Following this incident, he began advocating for Indian independence.

Kanokogi was a nationalist who emphasised the importance of the Imperial family in Japanese history. One of his principal works was Der Geist Japans ("The Spirit of Japan"), which was derived from a collection of lectures he gave in Germany arguing against Chinese influences on Japanese history. He was a member of the Yūzonsha society.

After the war, he was held at Sugamo Prison as a Class-A war criminal. He was released in 1946 on medical grounds because he was diagnosed with terminal pulmonary tuberculosis, and died three years later from this condition.
