= Kokutairon and Pure Socialism =

Treatise written by Ikki Kita

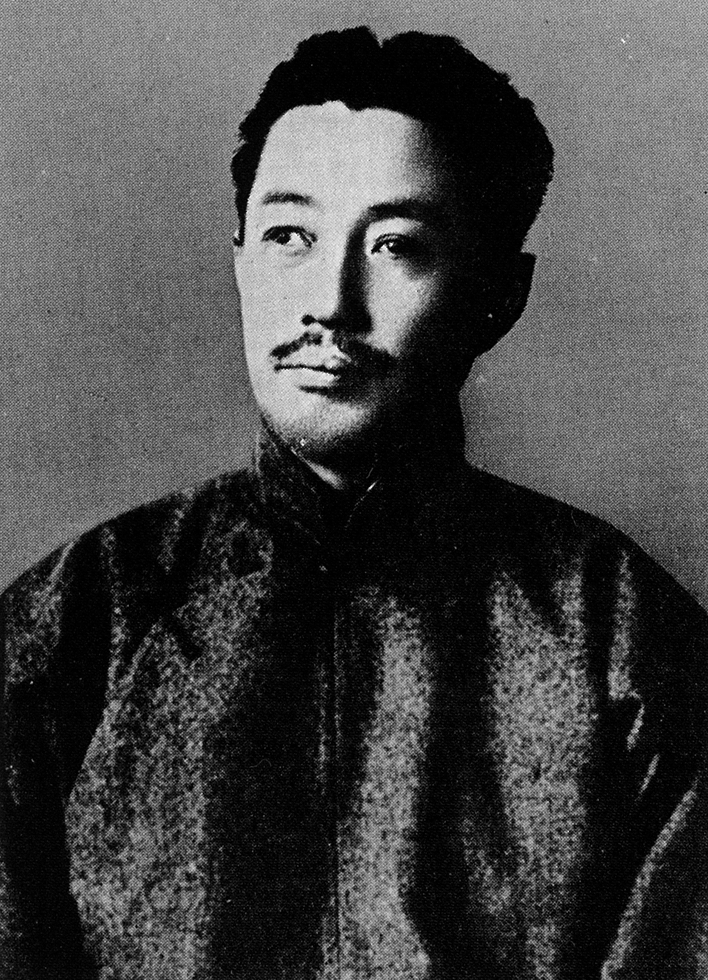
Ikki Kita

Kokutairon and Pure Socialism (1906), otherwise known as The Theory of Japan's National Polity and Pure Socialism (国体論及び純正社会主義), is a treatise written by Ikki Kita in critique of the government of Meiji Japan. Kita was a notable Japanese political intellectual in the late 19th century and early 20th century. His political views, commonly aligned with the ideology of Shōwa nationalism, reflect the widespread Japanese reaction against Meiji government and kokutairon (国体論) ideology on which their society was based.

== Historical background ==
In September 1905, Kita returned to Tokyo (from his home city of Sado) at the time of the Hibiya Riots, which protested the Treaty of Portsmouth. The treaty marked an end to the Russo-Japanese War and was externally negotiated by US President Theodore Roosevelt. It contained beneficial terms for Japan's imperialist policies. There was now an international recognition that Japan had influence and control over parts of Russian-dominated China and Korea. Yet activist groups considered these terms a humiliating failure and thus rioted. While Kita agreed with the protesters' aim to secure Japan's increased international prestige, he disagreed with their values in the Kokutai; which Kita believed "was a tool in the hands of the genro." It was in these circumstances that Kita wrote his first book, Kokutairon and Pure Socialism.

George Wilson summarises this context: "Kita wrote his first book against a background of widespread popular discontent over the outcome of the Russo-Japanese War." The riots marked a rise in violent political uprisings in Japan, a trend that favoured Kita and his radical political ideology.

Kokutairon was Kita's first politically inspired book and therefore reflects his early political views and alignments. Danny Orbach contends the book reflects Kita's "socialist, secular and rational phase." According to Oliviero Frattolillo, Kita was personally motivated to writing Kokutairon because of the uncritical mindset of his intellectual peers. Frattolillo claims, "Kita was particularly critical of the submissive attitude of certain intellectuals towards the system who obsequiously accepted the acquisition of new theories and new forms of knowledge from the west, translated and transplanted in Japan." He therefore wishes to plainly critique the faults of his society and propose a socialist alternative.

== Political ideology (Shōwa nationalism) ==
Kita's contextualised political ideology is defined as Shōwa statism, otherwise known as Japanese fascism or Shōwa nationalism. It is a sector of fascism that was often ultra-nationalist and militaristic in nature. It is categorised as a political syncretism, a political alignment that combines sectors from both left and right-wing politics and thus defies a singular identification. Kita was considered one of the great Japanese thinkers and intellectuals in this movement. Kita often took a more socialist and progressive-economic approach than the majority of Shōwa nationalists.

Kita's Kokutairon was influenced by his lecturers Ukita Kazutami (浮田 和民), Ariga Nagao and Abe Isoo at the Waseda University.

== Kita's argument ==
Kita's book is essentially a critique of the Meiji government and their interpretation and teaching of the 'kokutai". The kokutai is a concept of imperial sovereignty. During the Meiji period, the popular ideology of kokutairon was formed and disseminated throughout Japan via education reforms that taught constitution, civil codes and the sovereignty of the Emperor. It was this Meiji interpretation and propagation of kokutairon ideology that Kita challenged in his political treatise. Kita's main argument, according to George Wilson, was that socialism and kokutai (as Kita defined it, i.e. a legal social democracy) were one of the same. Danny Orbach contends that Kita's views were heavily influenced by Marxism.

Kita makes a few key arguments which will be summarised below to encapsulate his main thesis, criticisms and plan for the reorganisation of Japan.

=== Biological evolution ===
Kita argues that social democracy was the next natural progression of ideology and political structure for Japan. Social democracy is defined by Kita as the means "of extending political power to all elements of the state... it asserts that sovereignty resides in the state (which is equivalent to society)". Kita radically proposes that this is the only ideology that will allow human society (merely one species within the animal kingdom) to prosper in the struggle for survival. Any other system, will result in our extinction.

Kita claims that Japan was currently in a stage of political change in the evolution of socialism. Hiroshi Osedo identifies three distinct stages in Kita's history of Japan's social evolution. The first was a state run by the emperor, "the supreme organ" of the state. The second was a co-run emperor and Diet government. This second change was precipitated in the early nineteenth-century during the Samurai revolution, or Meiji restoration, where the Tokugawa Shogunate were overthrown and replaced by the new Meiji government. Before this, an aristocratic, hierarchical form of state existed, where power laid with the emperor and the shogun class. While this was an important and positive change for Japan, it was an inadequate development in Kita's perspective. The final, idealised form of state structure is described by Osedo: "Thirdly, there was the system in which the majority, declared equal to one another, constitute the supreme organ." The third stage of Japan's social evolution is described by Kita as the "citizen-state kokutai", described in the following section.

=== Citizen-state Kokutai ===
Kita claims that this stage should have been obtained in the social revolution of 1868, but misinterpretation halted 'positive' social change. Predominantly, Kita opposes the widely held belief of the sacred-divine right of the emperor. Such an opinion dangerously placed him in constant opposition with the Meiji regime and its kokutairon ideology. Contrary to popular sentiment, Kita believed the emperor was not sovereign, only the state could be sovereign and therefore the emperor was merely an "organ of the state." Kita states in kokutairon, "The emperor of Japan is an organ who began and continues to exist for purposes of the survival and evolution of the state." This was the main drive of Kita's argument. Essentially, Kita believed that under the Meiji regime, the emperor held too much power and prestige in a society that distinguished themself as a democracy. Therefore, in a modern democratic society such as Japan, they could not retain the sovereignty of the emperor. Kita's definition of 'true' kokutairon ideology is neatly expressed in his book:

"The present kokutai is not that of the age in which the state existed for the monarch's benefit, as his possession. It is the citizen-state Kokutai in which the state is recognised as a legal person having actual human character...It is socialism because sovereignty resides in the state, and it is democracy because power rests with the people"

=== The problem of the economic class ===
Despite this ideal, Kita identified practical barriers to this structure's implementation in Japan. This was because Japan's economic situation and privileged economic elite class failed "to conform to its new citizen-state kokutai." Kita's solution therefore was to "readjust the present economic structure, which conflicts with the legal ideal of the [Meiji restoration]... designate nationalisation of land and capital -- the economic aspect of socialism." The economic and legal sectors of Meiji society were inherently contradictory - one clung to tradition and the other, social democracy.

=== International sovereignty ===
Kita's Kokutairon is not limited to domestic concerns. He is as much concerned with class-struggle in Japan as he is with state-struggle in the international community. Kita's socialist ideal for the international society is the formation of a "world federation". Such an establishment would have the authority to resolve international disputes and conflicts of interests. However this was only possible where one state had majority control. Therefore, Kita was a big supporter of imperialism. He describes it as a "precondition of internationalism", eventually allowing the "liberty and equality of all states" under the world federation.

Kita's support of imperialism as a means to obtain socialist political structures, put him in contention with other socialists of his day. Japanese socialists, often pacifist in nature, strongly opposed the increasingly imperialist endeavours of the Japanese State. Kita on the other hand, was a big supporter of the Russo-Japanese war of 1904.

=== Kita's proposed solution ===
Kita finishes his book with a proposal for the reorganisation of the state. The first step was to initiate an economic revolution, removing the "economic aristocrats" who halted change as they gripped to pre-revolution ideals of state. Furthermore, Kita's solution to class struggle would be to introduce universal suffrage and enforce a system of election for representatives in the Diet.

Once domestic issues were resolved, then the state struggle of prestige and influence in the international community could be dealt with. Through a policy of imperialism, the socialist "world federation" could be established, ultimately a "socialist utopia." In order to achieve this utopia, however, Japan must "tire endlessly."

== Public reaction ==
Kita's book was rejected by almost every reputable publisher he approached. Many rejected due to the radical fascist ideology expressed, which directly opposed the ideology of their current government and thus endangered potential publishers. Others, such as the Heimin Shinbun, a socially inclined publishing house, rejected it on grounds of its sheer length (1000 pages). Kita's uncle, Homma Kazumatsu, eventually printed 500 copies of the manuscript on May 9, 1906. However, the home ministry of the Meiji Government had banned and removed all copies of Kita's book within 10 days of its publication. Kita only managed to successfully republish parts of Kokutairon over his lifetime. It was only published in its entirety in 1959 by Mizusu Shobo.

Despite its quick removal from the public domain, Kokutairon managed to elicit some response, though none in the way Kita envisaged. Chushichi Tsuzuki summarises the reaction: "His book was welcomed by advanced intellectuals of the day such as Katayama Sen, the prominent economist Fukuda Tokuzo, and Kawakami Hajime." Katayama Sen, as a pacifist socialist, disagreed with Kita's imperialist international approach, yet was otherwise impressed with his socialist perspectives, describing Kokutairon as "probably the greatest work among Japanese writings on socialism." It even elicited the support of prominent economic academics of his day (Fukuda Tokuzo and Kawakami Hajimie). These positive receptions were however halted by an awareness of the inevitable backlash from Meiji authorities, due to its provocative nature.

In 1906 Kita was invited to the Kakumei Hyoronsha group (Revolutionary Review Society), a Japanese socialist group dedicated to encouraging social revolution in China. Tsuzuki suggests that this was a reaction to Kokutairon's publication.

Christopher Szpilman suggests that Kita had purposely filled Kokutairon with emotionally and politically provocative elements in order to evoke an extreme reaction. That it was a plot to gain the attention of Japanese authorities. He states, "Kita constantly had ensured the book would stir extreme emotions by deliberately filling it with insults against the imperial family and various prominent academics.” Szpilman then includes a recurrent phrase in Kita's book to justify his claim. Kita often described the Japanese people as "idiots who had their skulls smashed in by the single phrase bans nikkei (the imperial line unbroken for ages immemorial)"

Kokutairon is now used as evidence for historical investigation of Kita Ikki and his changing political ideologies, evolution of Japanese fascist political thought and of public opinion toward Meiji government.

== See also ==
- Prussianism and Socialism
