= Reimeikai =

Reimeikai (黎明会, lit., "Dawn Society" or "Society for Enlightenment") was a Japanese "educational society" formed in Japan's Taishō period. The members declared themselves committed "to strive for the stabilization and enrichment of the life of the Japanese people in conformity with the new trends of the postwar world."

In December 1918, the group was formed in order to sponsor public lectures. Its founders included Yoshino Sakuzō and Fukuda Tokuzō. Reimeikai's membership supported universal suffrage and freedom of assembly. Also, they advocated less restrictions on the right to strike. The group came together "to propagate ideas of democracy among the people." The group dissolved in 1920.

It is not to be confused with the Owari Tokugawa Reimeikai Foundation, often just called the "Reimeikai Foundation".

== See also ==
- Nitobe Inazo
- Yosano Akiko
