= Takehiko Kanagoki =

Japanese basketball player

Personal information
- Nationality: Japanese
- Born: 17 June 1914 Tokyo, Japan
- Died: 19 February 1992 (aged 77)

Sport
- Sport: Basketball

Takehiko Kanagoki (17 June 1914 – 19 February 1992) was a Japanese basketball player. He competed in the men's tournament at the 1936 Summer Olympics. His correct family name is Kanokogi (鹿子木), not Kanagoki. He was the son of Japanese father, Kanokogi Kazunobu, philosopher, and Polish-German mother, Cornelia, Tadeusz Stefan Zieliński's daughter.
