= Shōwa era =

Period of Japanese history (1926–1989)

Shōwa 昭和
- 25 December 1926 – 7 January 1989
Taishō	Heisei
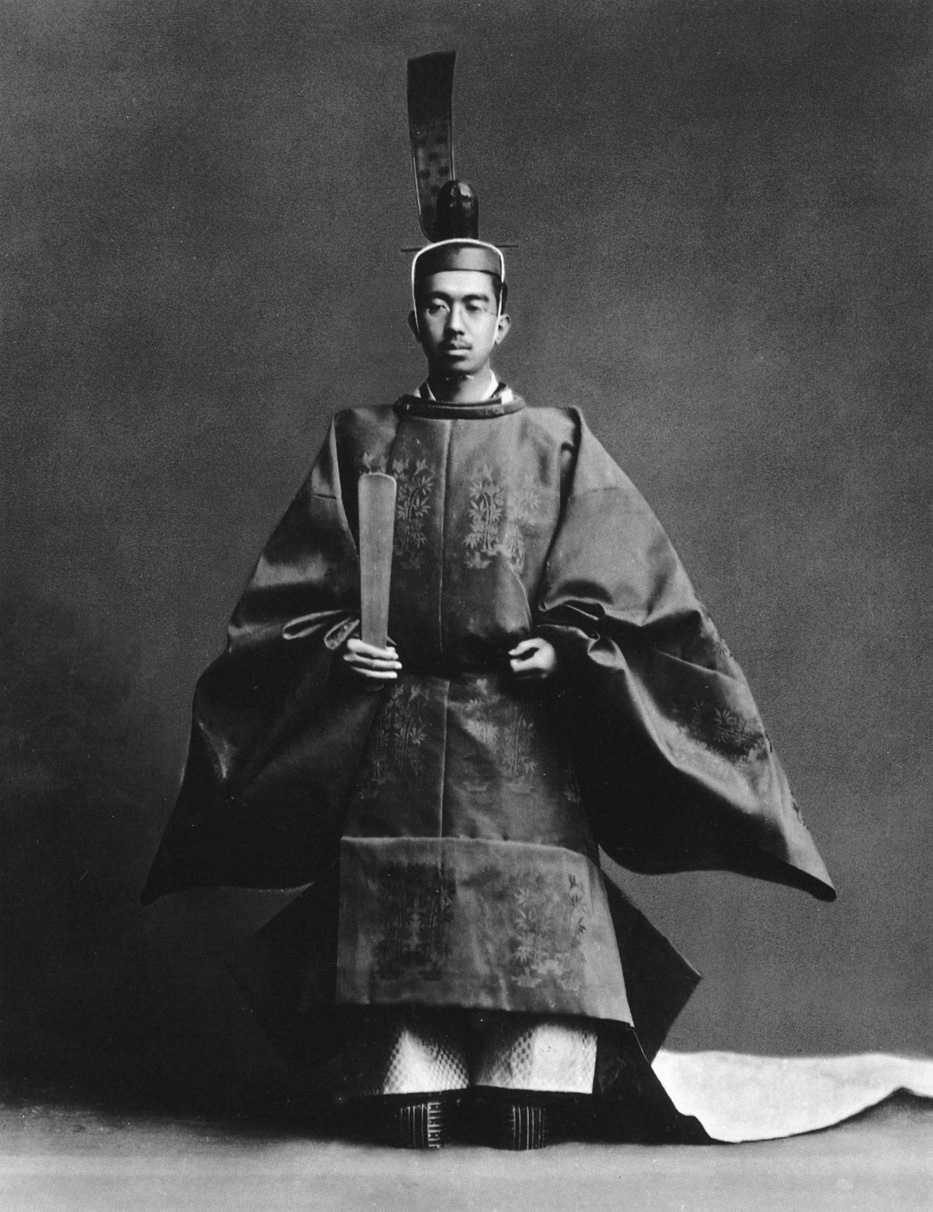
- Emperor Shōwa (1928)
- Location: Japan
- Including: Major events: Shōwa financial crisis; Mukden Incident; Japanese invasion of Manchuria; Second Sino-Japanese War; Pacific War; World War II; Surrender of Japan; Occupation of Japan; Constitutional amendment; Treaty of San Francisco; U.S.–Japan Security Treaty; Economic recovery; 1964 Summer Olympics; 1972 Winter Olympics
- Monarch: Shōwa
- Prime Ministers: List: Wakatsuki Reijirō; Tanaka Giichi; Hamaguchi Osachi; Inukai Tsuyoshi; Takahashi Korekiyo (acting); Saitō Makoto; Keisuke Okada; Fumio Gotō (acting); Kōki Hirota; Senjūrō Hayashi; Fumimaro Konoe; Hiranuma Kiichirō; Nobuyuki Abe; Mitsumasa Yonai; Hideki Tojo; Kuniaki Koiso; Kantarō Suzuki; Prince Naruhiko Higashikuni; Kijūrō Shidehara; Shigeru Yoshida; Tetsu Katayama; Hitoshi Ashida; Ichirō Hatoyama; Tanzan Ishibashi; Nobusuke Kishi; Hayato Ikeda; Eisaku Satō; Kakuei Tanaka; Takeo Miki; Takeo Fukuda; Masayoshi Ōhira; Masayoshi Ito (acting); Zenkō Suzuki; Yasuhiro Nakasone; Noboru Takeshita
- Key events: World War II; Occupation of Japan; Post-occupation Japan

The Shōwa era (昭和時代, Shōwa jidai; [ɕoːwadʑidai]) was a period of Japanese history corresponding to the reign of Emperor Shōwa (Hirohito) from December 25, 1926, until his death on January 7, 1989. It was preceded by the Taishō era and succeeded by the Heisei era.

In the late 1920s, Japan had begun moving into political totalitarianism, ultranationalism and statism, culminating in Japan's invasion of China in 1937, part of a global period of social upheavals and conflicts such as the Great Depression and the Pacific War.

Defeat in the Second World War brought about radical change in Japan. For the first and only time in its history, Japan was occupied by foreign powers, an American-led occupation which lasted for six years and eight months. Allied occupation brought forth sweeping democratic reforms. It led to the formal end of the emperor's status as a demigod and the transformation of Japan from a form of mixed constitutional and absolute monarchy to a constitutional monarchy and parliamentary system with a liberal democracy. In 1952, with the Treaty of San Francisco, Japan became a sovereign state again. The postwar Shōwa period was characterized by the Japanese economic miracle.

The Shōwa era was longer than the reign of any previous Japanese emperor. Emperor Shōwa was both the longest-living and longest-reigning historical Japanese emperor as well as the longest-reigning monarch in the world at the time. On 7 January 1989, Crown Prince Akihito succeeded to the Chrysanthemum Throne upon the death of his father, Emperor Shōwa, which marked the start of the Heisei era. Emperor Hirohito was served by a total of 33 prime ministers, beginning with Wakatsuki Reijirō and ending with Noboru Takeshita.

== Etymology ==
The two kanji characters in Shōwa (昭和) were from a passage of the Chinese Book of Documents: 百姓昭明，協和萬邦 (Translated: "[T]he people (of his domain), ... all became brightly intelligent. (Finally), he united and harmonized the myriad states.") From this same quotation, Japan also adopted the era name Meiwa (明和) during the Edo period in the late-18th century. There were two other candidates at the time – Dōwa (同和) and Genka (元化).

The term could be roughly understood as meaning "enlightened peace" or in some interpretations "radiant Japan".

In his enthronement address which was read to the people, the Emperor referenced this era name:

I have visited the battlefields of the Great War in France. In the presence of such devastation, I understand the blessing of peace and the necessity of concord among nations.

== Decline of "Taishō Democracy" ==
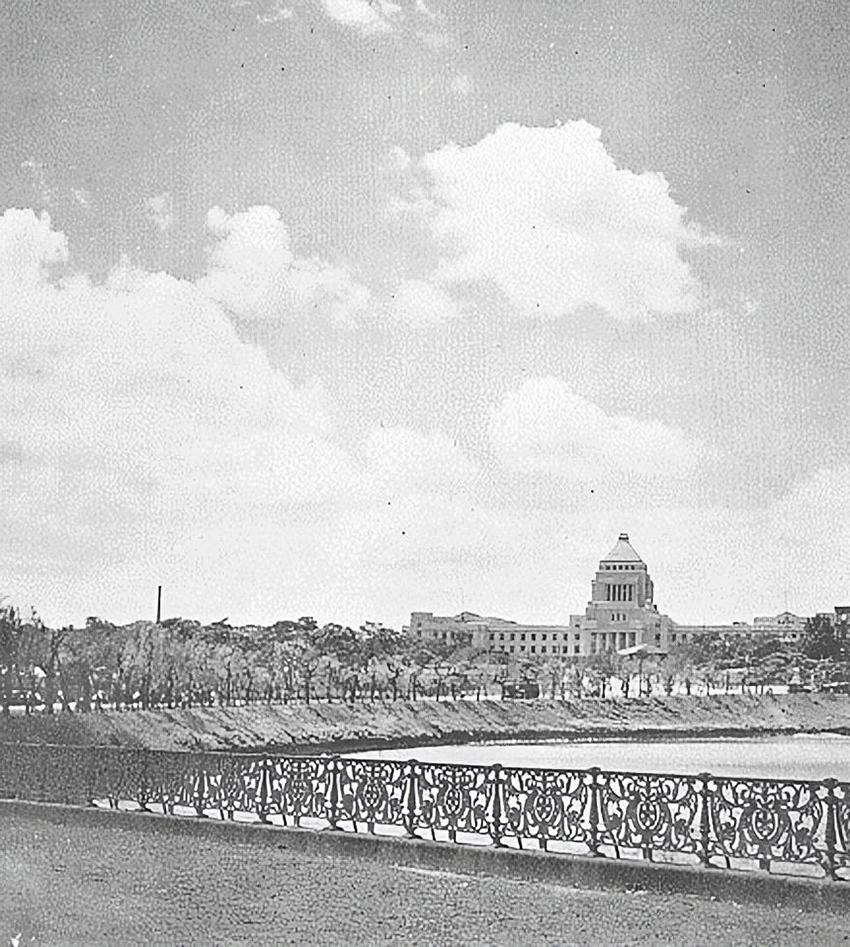
The National Diet Building, where both houses of the Imperial Diet of Japan meet, was completed in early Shōwa era (1936).

The election of Katō Takaaki as the Prime Minister of Japan continued democratic reforms that had been advocated by influential individuals on the left. This culminated in the passage of universal male suffrage in May 1925. The General Election Law gave all male subjects over the age of 25 the right to vote, provided they had lived in their electoral districts for at least one year and were not homeless. The electorate thereby nearly quadrupled in size, from 3.3 million to 12.5 million.

This increase in the electorate coincided with the passage of Peace Preservation Law of 1925 along with other anti-left-wing legislation. The Peace Preservation Act curtailed activism on the left — which was not extensive — and the screws were steadily tightened. It outlawed groups that sought to alter the system of government or to abolish private ownership.

The small leftist movements that had been galvanized by the Russian Revolution were subsequently crushed and scattered. This was in part due to the Peace Preservation Act, but also due to the general fragmentation of the left. Conservatives forced the passage of the Peace Preservation Law because the party leaders and politicians of the Taishō era had felt that, after World War I, the state was in danger from revolutionary movements. Hence, a proposal for socialist reforms, was seen as an attack on the very existence of the state. The meaning of the law was gradually stretched to academic spheres. After the passage of the Peace Preservation Law and related legislation, kokutai emerged as the symbol of the state. Kokutai was seen as the bulwark against communist and socialist movements in Japan. With the challenge of the Great Depression on the horizon, this would be the death knell for parliamentary democracy in Japan.

== Washington Conference to Mukden Incident ==
After World War I, the Western Powers, influenced by Wilsonian ideology, attempted an effort at general disarmament. At the Washington Naval Conference of 1921–1922, the Great Powers met to set limits on naval armament. The Five Power Naval Limitation Agreement worked out in Washington limited competition in battleships and aircraft carriers to a ratio of 5:5:3 (in terms of tonnage) for the United Kingdom, the United States, and Japan respectively. Japanese ultra-nationalists viewed this as an attempt by Western powers to curb Japanese expansionism in an area of the globe over which they had no interest. However, those in power in Japan readily agreed to the disarmament, realizing that the global taste for war had been soured after the First World War and knowing that, the ratio was sufficient to maintain hegemony in the Pacific.

In 1924, however, friendly U.S.–Japanese relations were torpedoed by the Immigration Act of 1924. The act closed off Japanese immigration to the United States and dropped Japanese immigrants to the level of other Asians (who were already excluded). The overwhelming reaction in Japan, both at the highest levels and in mass rallies that reflected angry public opinion, was hostile and sustained. Commentators suggested the opening guns of a race war and called for a new buildup of the Imperial Japanese Armed Forces.

The Shōwa financial crisis was a financial panic in 1927, during the first year of the reign of Emperor Hirohito. It was a precursor of the Great Depression. It brought down the government of Prime Minister Wakatsuki Reijirō and led to the domination of the zaibatsu over the Japanese banking industry.

From 1928 to 1932, a domestic crisis could no longer be avoided. As the left was vigorously put down by the state, the economic collapse brought new hardship to the people of Japan. Silk and rice prices plummeted and exports decreased 50%. Unemployment in both the cities and the countryside skyrocketed and social agitation came to a head. Most of the military recruits were from the countryside and they brought their anger against the government into the military.

Meanwhile, the London Naval Treaty was ratified in 1930. Its purpose was to extend the Washington Treaty System. The Japanese government had desired to raise their ratio to 10:10:7, but this proposal was swiftly countered by the United States. Thanks to back-room dealing and other intrigues, though, Japan walked away with a 5:4 advantage in heavy cruisers, but this small gesture would not satisfy the populace of Japan, which was gradually falling under the spell of the various ultra-nationalist groups spawning throughout the country. As a result of his failings regarding the London Naval Treaty, Prime Minister Hamaguchi Osachi was shot on November 14, 1930, by an ultranationalist and died in 1931.

By this time, the civilian government had lost control of the populace. A New York Times correspondent called Japan a country ruled by "government by assassination". The army, moving independently of the proper government of Japan, took the opportunity to invade Manchuria in the summer of 1931.

Since the Russo-Japanese War of 1905, Japan had maintained a military presence in Manchuria. On September 18, 1931, the Mukden Incident occurred. There was a small explosion on the tracks of a Japanese railway, north of Mukden. Japan invaded Manchuria in the aftermath. The Imperial Japanese Army mobilized the Kwantung Army and attacked Chinese troops. The Minseito government, headed by Hamaguchi's successor Wakatsuki Reijirō, was unable to curb the army's offensive. The Kwantung Army conquered all of Manchuria and set up the puppet state of Manchukuo on March 1, 1932. The last Emperor of China, Puyi, was installed as the puppet ruler of Manchukuo. The Diet, now dominated by army officials, voted to withdraw from the League of Nations. The first seeds of the coming conflict had been sown.

== Rise of nationalism ==
Prior to 1868, most Japanese more readily identified with their feudal domain rather than the idea of "Japan" as a whole. When the Tokugawa shogunate was overthrown, the leaders of the revolt, Satsuma and Chōshū, were ideologically opposed to the house of Tokugawa since the Battle of Sekigahara. The Meiji era changed all of that. With the introduction of mass education, conscription, industrialization, centralization, and successful foreign wars, Japanese nationalism began to foment as a powerful force in society. Mass education and conscription served as a means to indoctrinate the coming generation with "the idea of Japan" as a nation state instead of a series of daimyōs. In this way, loyalty to feudal domains was supplanted with loyalty to the central government. Industrialization and centralization gave the Japanese a strong sense that their country could once more rival and dominate Western powers technologically and socially. Moreover, successful foreign wars gave the populace a sense of martial pride and overconfidence in the strength of their country.

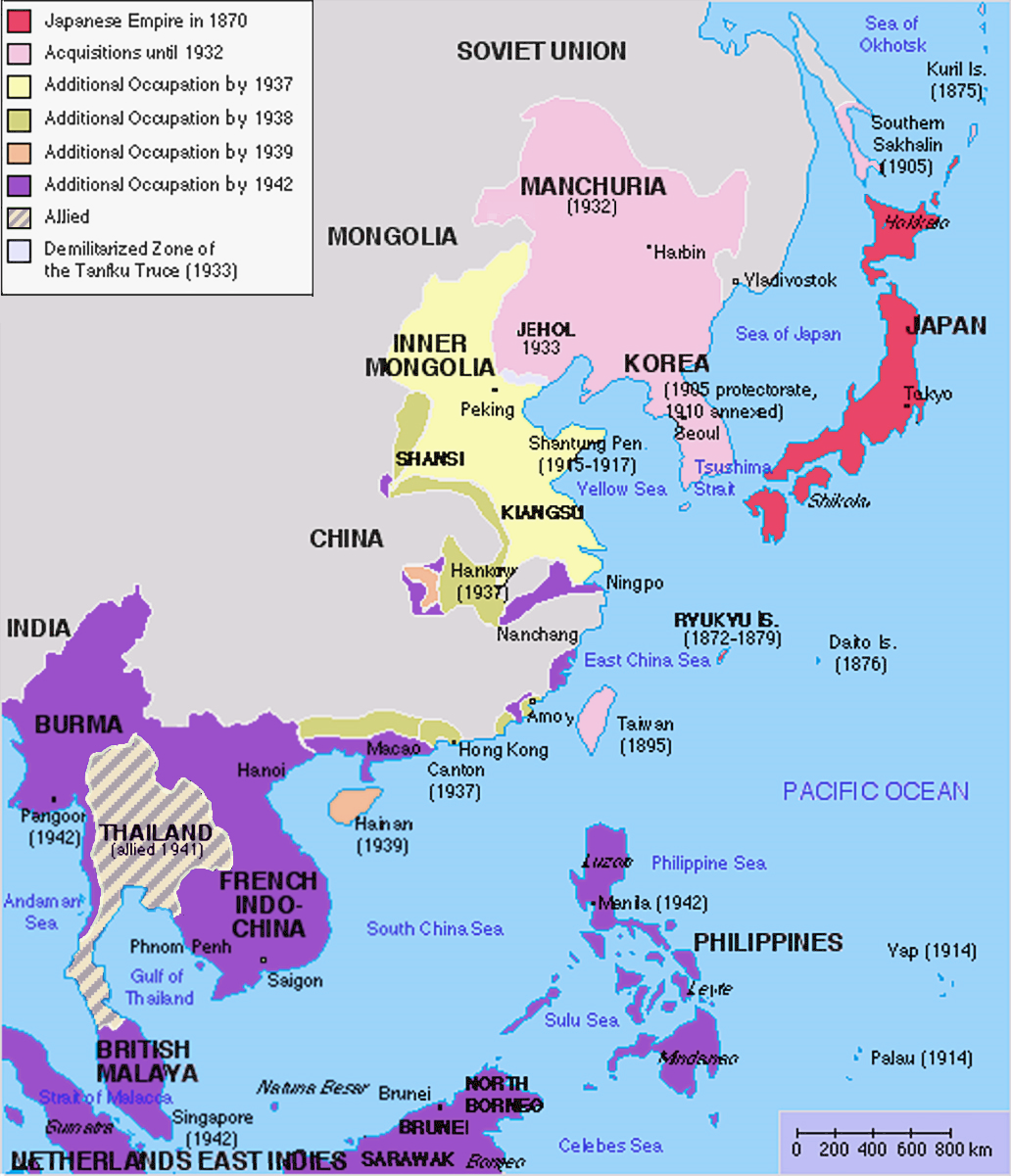
Maximum extent of the Japanese colonial empire

The rise of Japanese nationalism paralleled the growth of nationalism within the West. Certain conservatives such as Gondō Seikei and Asahi Heigo saw the rapid industrialization of Japan as something that had to be tempered. During the Meiji era, such nationalists railed against the unequal treaties, but in the years following the First World War, Western criticism of Japanese imperial ambitions and restrictions on Japanese immigration changed the focus of the nationalist movement in Japan.

Japanese nationalism was buoyed by a romantic concept of Bushidō and driven by a modern concern for rapid industrial development and strategic dominance in East Asia. It saw the Triple Intervention of 1895 as a threat to Japanese success in East Asia and warned that the "ABCD Powers" (America, Britain, China, and the Dutch), were threatening the Empire of Japan. One solution was war.

During the first part of the Shōwa era, racial discrimination against other Asians was habitual in Imperial Japan, having begun with the start of Japanese colonialism. The Shōwa regime thus preached racial superiority and racialist theories, based on sacred nature of the Yamato-damashii. One of Emperor Shōwa's teachers, historian Kurakichi Shiratori, remarked, "Therefore nothing in the world compares to the divine nature (shinsei) of the imperial house and likewise the majesty of our national polity (kokutai). Here is one great reason for Japan's superiority."

The Anti-Comintern Pact brought Nazi ideologues to Japan who attempted but ultimately failed to inject Nazi-style anti-Semitic arguments into mainstream public discussion. Where the government presented the negative image of Jews, it was not so much to persecute but to strengthen domestic ideological uniformity.

The antisemitic policies of Adolf Hitler's Nazi Germany were refused when foreign minister of Japan Yōsuke Matsuoka stated that: "Nowhere have I promised that we would carry out his anti-Semitic policies in Japan. This is not simply my personal opinion, it is the opinion of Japan, and I have no compunction about announcing it to the world."

Imperial Japanese Army General Kiichiro Higuchi and Colonel Norihiro Yasue allowed 20,000 Jews to enter Manchukuo in 1938. Higuchi and Yasue were well regarded for their actions and were subsequently invited to the independence ceremonies of the State of Israel. Diplomat Chiune Sugihara wrote travel visas for over 6,000 Lithuanian Jews to flee the German occupation and travel to Japan. In 1985, Israel honored him as Righteous Among the Nations for his actions.

== Military state ==
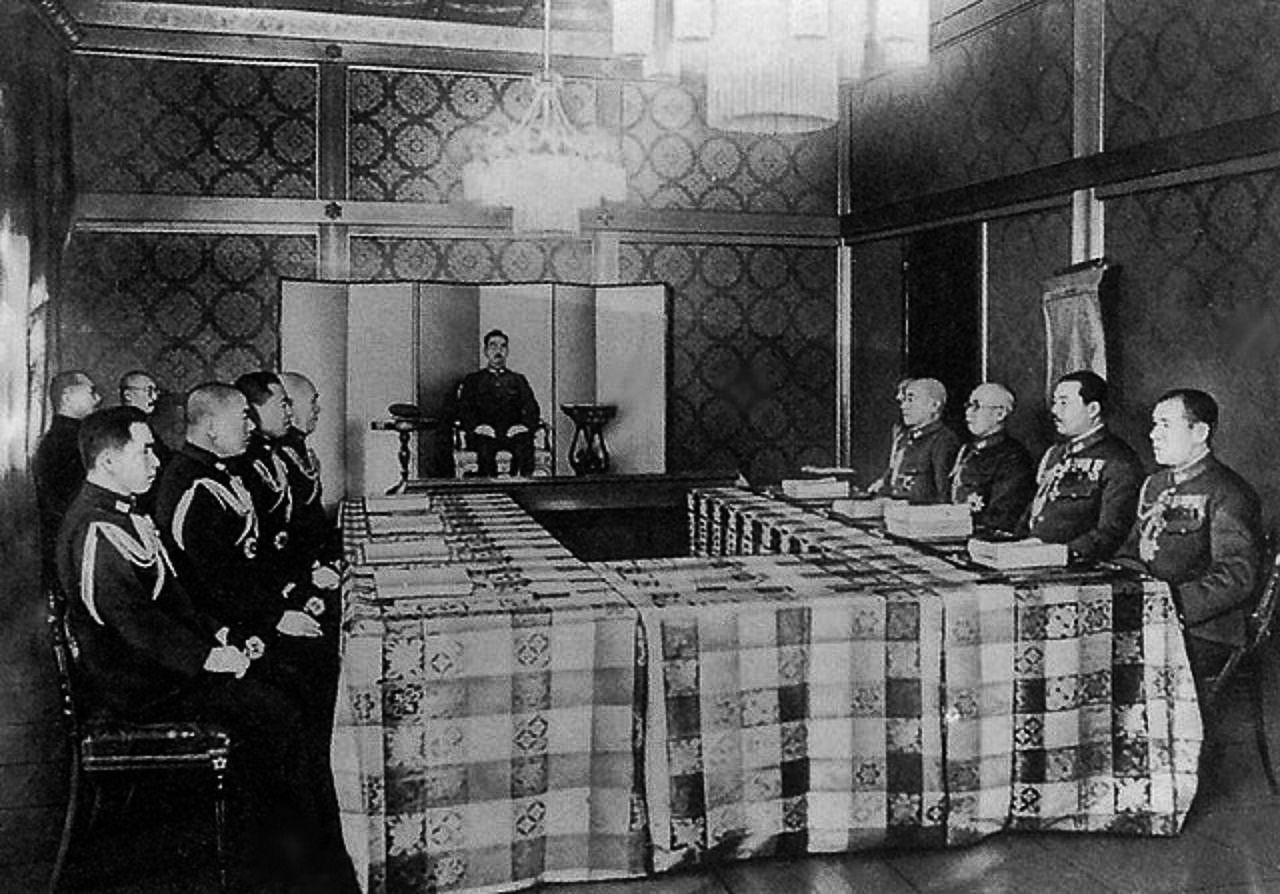
Japanese Emperor Hirohito as head of the Imperial General Headquarters on April 29, 1943

The withdrawal from the League of Nations meant that Japan was politically isolated. Japan had no strong allies and its actions had been internationally condemned, whilst internally popular nationalism was booming. Local leaders, such as mayors, teachers, and Shinto priests were recruited by the various movements to indoctrinate the populace with ultra-nationalist ideals. They had little time for the pragmatic ideas of the business elite and party politicians, with their loyalty laying solely to the Emperor and the military.

In March 1932, the "League of Blood" assassinations and the chaos surrounding the trial of its conspirators further eroded the rule of law and democracy in Shōwa Japan. In May the same year, a group of right-wing Army and Navy officers succeeded in assassinating Prime Minister Inukai Tsuyoshi, as he had actively tried to curb the growing political power of the Japanese military. The plot fell short of staging a complete coup d'état, but it effectively ended democratic rule by political parties in Japan.

From 1932 to 1936, the country was governed by generals and admirals. Mounting nationalist sympathies led to chronic instability in government. Moderate policies were difficult to enforce and divisions widened within the military. The crisis culminated on February 26, 1936. In what became known as the February 26 Incident, about 1,500 ultranationalist army troops marched on central Tokyo. Their mission was to assassinate the government and promote a "Shōwa Restoration". Prime Minister Okada survived the attempted coup by hiding in a storage shed in his house, but other officials were killed and the coup only ended when Emperor Showa personally ordered an end to the bloodshed.

Within the state, the idea of a Greater East Asian Co-Prosperity Sphere began to foment. The nationalists believed that the "ABCD powers" (Americans, British, Chinese, Dutch) were a threat to all Asians and that Asia could only survive by following the Japanese example. These major world powers had actively sanctioned Japan, an import-dependent nation which rely heavily on natural resources, resources that could found in the rest of Asia. Japan had been the only Asian and non-Western power to industrialize itself successfully and rival great Western empires. While largely described by contemporary Western observers as a front for the expansion of the Japanese army, the idea behind the Co-Prosperity Sphere was that Asia would be united against the Western powers under the auspices of the Japanese. The idea drew influence in the paternalistic aspects of Confucianism, Japanese Buddhism and Koshitsu Shinto. Thus, the main goal of the Sphere was the hakkō ichiu, the unification of the eight corners of the world under the rule (kōdō) of the Emperor.

The reality during this period differed from the propaganda. Some nationalities and ethnic groups were marginalized, and during rapid military expansion into foreign countries, the Imperial General Headquarters tolerated many atrocities against local populations, such as the experimentations of Unit 731, the sankō sakusen, the use of chemical and biological weapons, and civilian massacres such as those in Nanjing, Singapore and Manila.

Some of the atrocities were motivated by racism. For instance, Japanese soldiers were taught to think of captured Chinese as not worthy of mercy.

== Second Sino-Japanese War ==
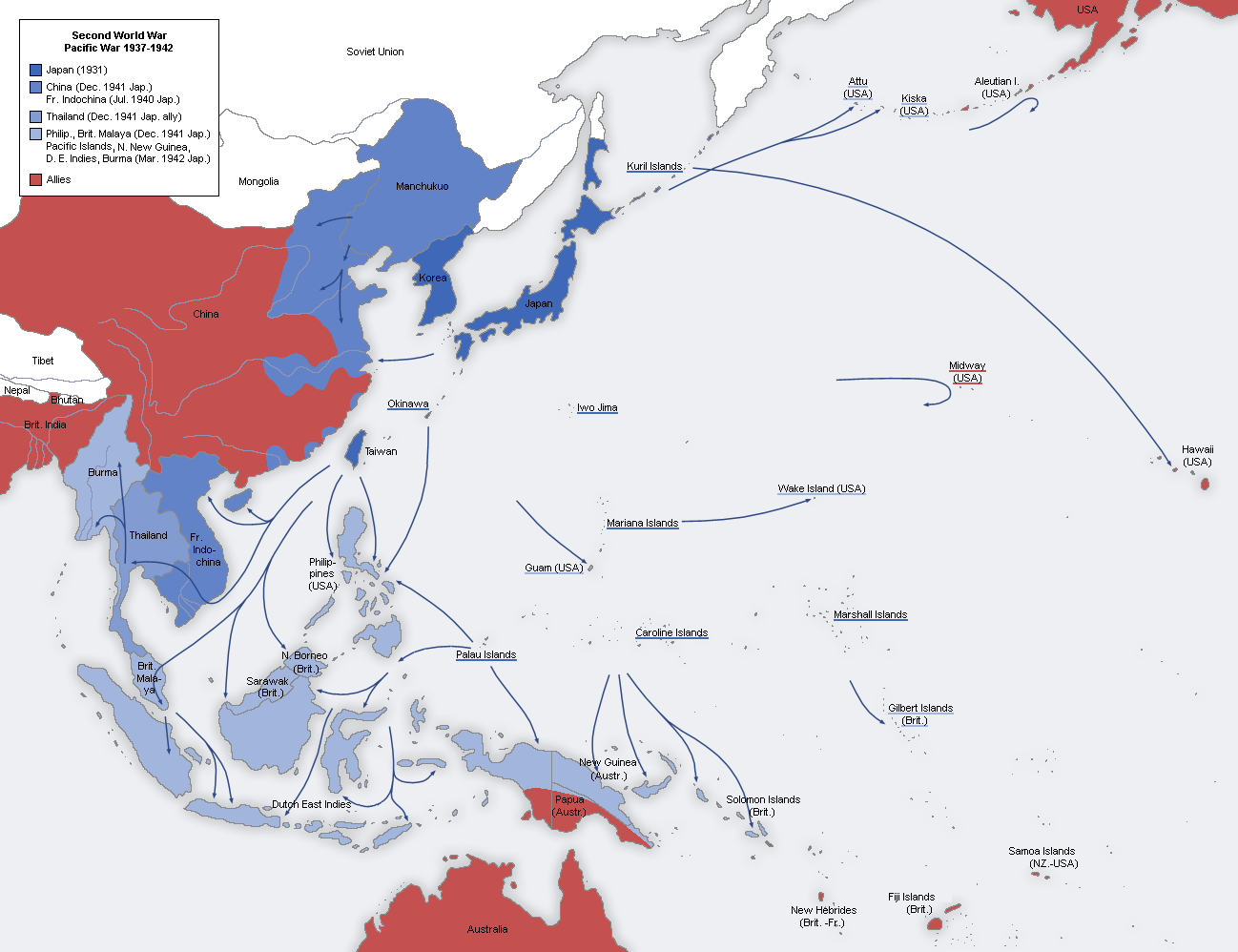
A map of the Japanese advance from 1937 to 1942

On July 7, 1937, at the Marco Polo Bridge, the Japanese Kwantung army stationed there used explosions heard on the Chinese side of Manchuria as a false pretext for invasion. The invasion led to a large-scale war known as the Second Sino-Japanese War approved by the Emperor that was called a "holy war" (Seisen) in Imperial propaganda.

At the time, China was divided internally between the Chinese Communist Party (CCP), which was under the leadership of Mao Zedong, and the Nationalist government of China, the Kuomintang (KMT), which was under the leadership of Chiang Kai-shek.

The years of 1937–38 were a time of rapid and remarkable success by the Japanese, who had a number of advantages over the Chinese army. While the Japanese army possessed a smaller force of Japanese armoury and artillery than many Western powers, it was far ahead of China in this respect, and was also in command of the world's third largest navy with 2,700 watercraft at its disposal.

By the end of July 1937, the Japanese had slaughtered the elite 29th Army at Kupeikou and soon captured Beijing. From there, the Japanese advanced down south through the major railway lines (Peiping-Suiyan, Peiping-Hankow, and Tientsin-Pukow). These were easily conquered by the superior Japanese army.

By October, Chiang Kai-shek's best armies had been defeated at Shanghai. By the end of the year, the Chinese capital at Nanjing had also been seized. The use of brutal scorched earth tactics by both sides, the Chinese as in 1938 Yellow River flood and later by the Japanese with the Three Alls Policy, "kill all, burn all, loot all", initiated in 1940, claimed millions of lives. The Chinese nationalists resorted to massive civilian guerrilla tactics, which fatigued and frustrated Japanese forces. Countless Chinese civilians were executed on the suspicion of being resistance fighters. Japanese war crimes at Nanking and other sites in China and Manchukuo have been well documented.

On December 13, 1937, the Imperial Japanese Army, following the capture of Nanjing, began the Nanjing Massacre (sometimes called the "Rape of Nanking"), which resulted in a massive number of civilian deaths including infants and elderly, and the large-scale rape of Chinese women. The exact number of casualties is an issue of fierce debate between Chinese and Japanese historians.

By 1939, the Japanese war effort had become a stalemate. The Japanese Army had seized most of the vital cities in China, including Shanghai, Nanjing, Beijing, and Wuhan. The Nationalists and the Communists, however, fought on from Chongqing and Yenan, respectively.

== Pacific War ==
Negotiations for a German-Japanese alliance began in 1937 with the onset of hostilities between Japan and China. On September 27, 1940, the Tripartite Pact was signed, creating the Rome-Tokyo-Berlin Axis. The alliance was shallow, with very little coordination or mutual help until the last two years of the war, when it was too late to make much difference.

By 1938, the United States increasingly was committed to supporting China and, with the cooperation of Britain and the Netherlands, threatening to restrict the supply of vital materials to the Japanese war machine, especially oil, steel and money. The Japanese army, after sharp defeats by the Russians in Mongolia, wanted to avoid war with the Soviet Union, even though it would have aided the German war against the USSR. The Emperor became fatalistic about going to war, as the military assumed more and more control. Prime Minister Fumimaro Konoe was replaced by the war cabinet of General Hideki Tojo (1884–1948), who demanded war. Tōjō had his way and the attack was made on Pearl Harbor in December 1941, as well as British and Dutch strong points. The main American battle fleet was disabled, and in the next 90 days Japan made remarkable advances including the Dutch East Indies, the Philippines, Malaya and Singapore.

The quagmire in China did not stall imperial ambitions for the creation of a Greater East Asian Co-Prosperity Sphere. Indeed, the Second Sino-Japanese War fueled the need for oil that could be found in the Dutch East Indies. After the Imperial General Headquarters refused to remove its troops from China (excluding Manchukuo) and French Indochina, U.S. President Franklin D. Roosevelt announced in July 1941 an oil embargo on Japan. The Imperial Japanese Navy, increasingly threatened by the loss of its oil supplies, insisted on a decision, warning the alternatives were a high risk war, that Japan might lose, or a certain descent into third class status and a loss of China and Manchuria. Officially the Emperor made the decision, but he was told by a key civilian official on 5 November 1941:

it is impossible, from the standpoint of our domestic political situation and of our self-preservation, to accept all of the American demands. ...we cannot let the present situation continue. If we miss the present opportunity to go to war, we will have to submit to American dictation. Therefore, I recognize that it is inevitable that we must decide to start a war against the United States. I will put my trust in what I have been told: namely, that things will go well in the early part of the war; and that although we will experience increasing difficulties as the war progresses, there is some prospect of success.

With the Emperor's approval, Imperial General Headquarters launched the Greater East Asia War. It began with a surprise attack on the U.S. naval base in Hawaii at Pearl Harbor on December 7, 1941. Japan declared war on the United States, Dutch and British. This marked the start of the Pacific War theatre of World War II. For the next six months, the Japanese had the initiative and went on the offensive. Hong Kong was overrun on December 8, 1941. By the summer of 1942, the Japanese had conquered Burma, Siam, the Dutch East Indies, and the Philippines. The Empire of Japan was one of the largest in history. In 1942 the Empire of Japan was at its greatest extent with colonies in Manchuria, China, Indonesia, the Philippines, Malaysia, Papua New Guinea, French Indochina, Burma and many Pacific islands.

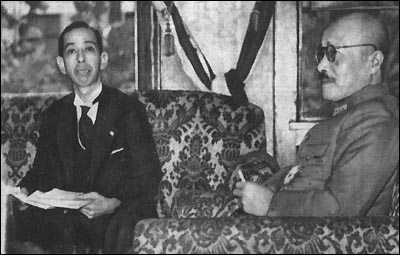
Prime Minister Hideki Tojo (right) and Nobusuke Kishi, October 1943

The decisive naval/aerial Battle of Midway took place in early June 1942. That changed the momentum of the war. Japan was put on the defensive as the Americans pursued their policy of island hopping. Tokyo was repeatedly firebombed in 1945 and in the early spring and summer of 1945, Iwo Jima and Okinawa were seized by the Americans. Finally, the death agony of the Empire of Japan came in August 1945. On August 6, an atomic bomb was dropped on Hiroshima, instantly killing approximately 70,000 people when the attack took place (plus another estimated 130,000 by 1960 due to after-effects). On August 8, the Soviet invasion of Manchuria began. The following day, a second atomic bomb was dropped on Nagasaki, killing approximately 40,000 people. These attacks with the new atomic weapons were a surprise. Japan lacked any atomic bomb technology and could not counter it. The government of the Empire of Japan (Prime Minister Kantarō Suzuki) surrendered on August 14. The official surrender ceremony was held on September 2.

Total Japanese military fatalities between 1937 and 1945 were 2.1 million; most came in the last year of the war. Starvation or malnutrition-related illness accounted for roughly 80 percent of Japanese military deaths in the Philippines, and 50 percent of military fatalities in China. The aerial bombing of a total of 69 Japanese cities appears to have taken a minimum of 400,000 and possibly closer to 600,000 civilian lives (over 100,000 in Tokyo alone, over 200,000 in Hiroshima and Nagasaki combined, and 80,000–150,000 civilian deaths in the battle of Okinawa). Civilian deaths among settlers who died attempting to return to Japan from Manchuria in the winter of 1945 were probably around 100,000.

=== Imperial rule ===
Japan launched multiple attacks in East Asia. In 1937, the Japanese Army invaded and captured most of the coastal Chinese cities such as Shanghai. On 22 September 1940, the Japanese invasion of French Indochina began and took over French Indochina (Vietnam, Laos and Cambodia). British Hong Kong fell in December 1941, followed by British Malaya (Brunei, Malaysia and Singapore) in the early months of 1942 as well as the Dutch East Indies (Indonesia). Thailand managed to stay independent by becoming a satellite state of Japan.

On 13 April 1941, the Soviet–Japanese Neutrality Pact was signed. In December 1941 to May 1942, Japan sank major elements of the American, British and Dutch fleets, captured Hong Kong, Singapore, the Philippines and the Dutch East Indies, and reached the borders of India and Australia. Japan suddenly had achieved its goal of ruling the Greater East Asia Co-Prosperity Sphere.

The ideology of Japan's colonial empire, as it expanded dramatically during the war, contained two somewhat contradictory impulses. On the one hand, it preached the unity of the Greater East Asia Co-Prosperity Sphere, a Pan-Asian coalition of Asian nations, led by Japan, against Western imperialism in Asia. This approach celebrated the spiritual values of the East in opposition to the "crass" materialism of the West. In practice, however, the Japanese installed organizationally-minded bureaucrats and engineers to run their annexed territories, and they believed in ideals of efficiency, modernization, and engineering solutions to social problems. It was fascism based on technology and rejected Western norms of democracy. After 1945, the engineers and bureaucrats took over and turned the wartime techno-fascism into entrepreneurial management skills.

The Japanese government established puppet regimes in Manchuria and China; they were dismantled at the end of the war. The Army operated ruthless governments in most of the conquered areas but paid more favorable attention to the Dutch East Indies. The main goal was to obtain oil. The Dutch sabotaged their oil wells but the Japanese were able to reopen them. However most of the tankers taking oil to Japan were sunk by American submarines, so Japan's oil shortage became increasingly acute. Japan sponsored an Indonesian nationalist movement under Sukarno. Sukarno finally came to power in the late 1940s after several years of battling the Dutch.

== Defeat and Allied occupation ==
With the defeat of the Empire of Japan, the Allied Powers dissolved it and placed the territories under occupation. The Soviet Union was made responsible for North Korea, and annexed the Kuril Islands and the southern portion of the island of Sakhalin. The United States took responsibility for the rest of Japan's possessions in Oceania and took over South Korea. China, meanwhile, plunged back into its civil war, with the Communists in control by 1949. General Douglas MacArthur, from the US, was put in charge of the Allied Occupation of Japan as the Supreme Commander for the Allied Powers; he and his staff exerted wide but indirect power, for the decisions were carried out by Japanese officials.

A War Crimes Tribunal for the Far East, similar to the Nuremberg Trials, was set up in Tokyo. On 3 May 1946, the prosecution began of Japanese military leaders for war crimes. Several prominent members of the Japanese cabinet were executed, most notably former Prime Minister Hideki Tojo. But the Emperor, Hirohito was neither tried at the Tokyo trials nor dethroned, nor any members of the imperial family. Instead, under the Post-war Constitution, the Japanese Emperor was reduced to a figurehead nominal monarch without divine characteristics and is forbidden to play a role in politics.

Douglas MacArthur sought to break the power of the zaibatsu; Japan was democratized and liberalized along American "New Deal" liberal lines. Parliamentary party politics was restored. Old left-wing organizations such as the Social Democratic Party and the Japanese Communist Party reasserted themselves. The first post-war general election was held in 1946, and for the first time, women were allowed to vote.

On 3 May 1947, the Constitution of Japan went into effect. This changed the Empire of Japan into the State of Japan (Nihon Koku, 日本国) with a liberal democracy (constitutional monarchy and parliamentary system). pre-war Japanese military was disarmed completely and the absoluteness of the Emperor of Japan was repealed by the Post-war Constitution. Article 9 turned Japan into a pacifist country with a self-defensive military.

In July 1947, the Japanese government, with the encouragement of the U.S. occupation forces, established a National Police Reserve (警察予備隊 Keisatsu-yobitai). This consisted of 75,000 men equipped with light infantry weapons. This was the first step of its post-war rearmament. In mid-1952, The Coastal Safety Force (海上警備隊 Kaijō-keibitai) was founded. It was the waterborne counterpart of National Police Reserve.

The Reverse Course was soon initiated by the United States to suppress any communist movements in Japan that was sympathetic to the Soviet Union, to which Japan became a front in the Cold War that soon ensued between the United States and the Soviet Union. Through diplomatic negotiations and clemency policies championed by America, all surviving Class A, B, and C convicted war criminals in Allied custody were released, and several rehabilitated officials became central architects of postwar Japan's political and corporate landscape, such as Nobusuke Kishi, who became Prime Minister of Japan in 1957.

Meanwhile, Shigeru Yoshida was elected as the Prime Minister of Japan from 1946 to 1947 and from 1948 to 1954. His policy, known as the "Yoshida Doctrine", emphasized military reliance on the United States and promoted unrestrained economic growth. On 8 September 1951, the US-led Allied Occupation of Japan ended after the signing of the Treaty of San Francisco, which became effective on April 28, 1952. It restored the sovereignty of Japan. On the same day, the Security Treaty Between the United States and Japan was signed as Cold War tensions rose; it was later replaced by the 1960 Treaty of Mutual Cooperation and Security Between the United States and Japan. The 1960 treaty requires the U.S. to protect Japan from external aggression. It allows United States forces to be stationed in Japan. Meanwhile, Japanese ground and maritime forces deal with internal threats and natural disasters. This established the U.S.–Japan alliance.

By the late 1940s, there were two conservative parties (the Democratic Party and Liberal Party); after a series of mergers, they came together in 1955 as the Liberal Democratic Party (LDP). By 1955, the political system stabilized in what was called the 1955 System. The two chief parties were the conservative LDP and the leftist Japan Socialist Party (JSP). Throughout the period 1955 to 2009, the LDP was dominant (with a brief interlude in 1993–94). The LDP was pro-capitalism, pro-American, and had a strong rural base.

== The "Japanese Miracle" ==
Japan's remarkable economic growth in the decades following 1950 has been called the "Japanese Miracle", as the economy of Japan grew three times faster than other major nations. It was achieved almost without foreign capital. The miracle slackened off in 1973 in the face of an upsurge in oil prices and the destabilization of international trade. By the mid-1990s the economy entered an era of stagnation and low growth that still persists.

Saburō Ōkita (1914–93), an economist, realized by 1942 that the war was lost; his subsequent research on economic recovery was published in 1945 as "The Fundamental Directions for the Reconstruction of the Japanese Economy". He became foreign minister in 1979 and endeavored to integrate Japan economically and politically with the world economy.

From 1950 onward, Japan rebuilt itself politically and economically. Sugita finds that "the 1950s was a decade during which Japan formulated a unique corporate capitalist system in which government, business, and labor implemented close and intricate cooperation".

Japan's newfound economic power soon gave it dominant economic influence in the world. The Yoshida Doctrine and the Japanese government's economic intervention spurred on an economic miracle on par with the record of West Germany. The Japanese government strove to spur industrial development through a mix of protectionism and trade expansion. The establishment of the Ministry of International Trade and Industry (MITI) was instrumental in the Japanese post-war economic recovery. By 1954, the MITI system was in full effect. It coordinated industry and government action and fostered cooperative arrangements, and sponsored research to develop promising exports as well as imports for which substitutes would be sought (especially dyestuffs, iron and steel, and soda ash). Yoshida's successor, Prime Minister Hayato Ikeda, began implementing economic policies which removed much of Japan's anti-monopoly laws. Foreign companies were locked out of the Japanese market and strict protectionist laws were enacted.

Meanwhile, the United States under President Dwight D. Eisenhower saw Japan as the economic anchor for Western Cold War policy in Asia. Japan was completely demilitarized and did not contribute to military power, but did provide the economic power. The US and UN forces used Japan as their forward logistics base during the Korean War (1950–53), and orders for supplies flooded Japan. The close economic relationship strengthened the political and diplomatic ties, so that the two nations survived a major political crisis in 1960 involving left-wing opposition to the revision of the U.S.-Japan Security Treaty. The left failed to force the removal of large American military bases in Japan, especially on Okinawa Prefecture. Shimizu argues that the American policy of creating "people of plenty" was a success in Japan and reached its goal of defusing anti-capitalist protest on the left.

On 1 July 1954, the Self-Defense Forces Act (Act No. 165 of 1954) reorganized the National Security Board as the Defense Agency on July 1, 1954. Afterward, the National Security Force was reorganized as the Japan Ground Self-Defense Force (GSDF) (陸上自衛隊 Rikujō Jieitai). The Coastal Safety Force was reorganized as the Japan Maritime Self-Defense Force (JMSDF) (海上自衛隊 Kaijō Jieitai). The Japan Air Self-Defense Force (JASDF) (航空自衛隊 Kōkū Jieitai) was established as a new branch of the Japan Self-Defense Forces (JSDF) (自衛隊 Jieitai). These are the de facto postwar Japanese army, navy and air force as the successor to the Imperial Japanese Army and Navy.

On 12 December 1956, Japan joined the United Nations.

In 1957, Japan was the first country to build dedicated railway lines for high-speed travel. In 1957, Odakyu Electric Railway introduced its 3000 series SE Romancecar train, setting a world speed record of 145 km/h (90 mph) for a narrow gauge train. This would lead to the design of the first Shinkansen, This record gave impetus for the design of the first 0 Series Shinkansen.

In 1960, Japan was wracked by the massive Anpo Protests against the revision of the U.S.-Japan Security Treaty. This began the turmoil of the Japanese New Left.

On 1 October 1964, the largest Japanese land reclamation project thus far was completed in Lake Hachirōgata. The village of Ōgata was established. Land reclamation work began at Lake Hachirōgata in April 1957.

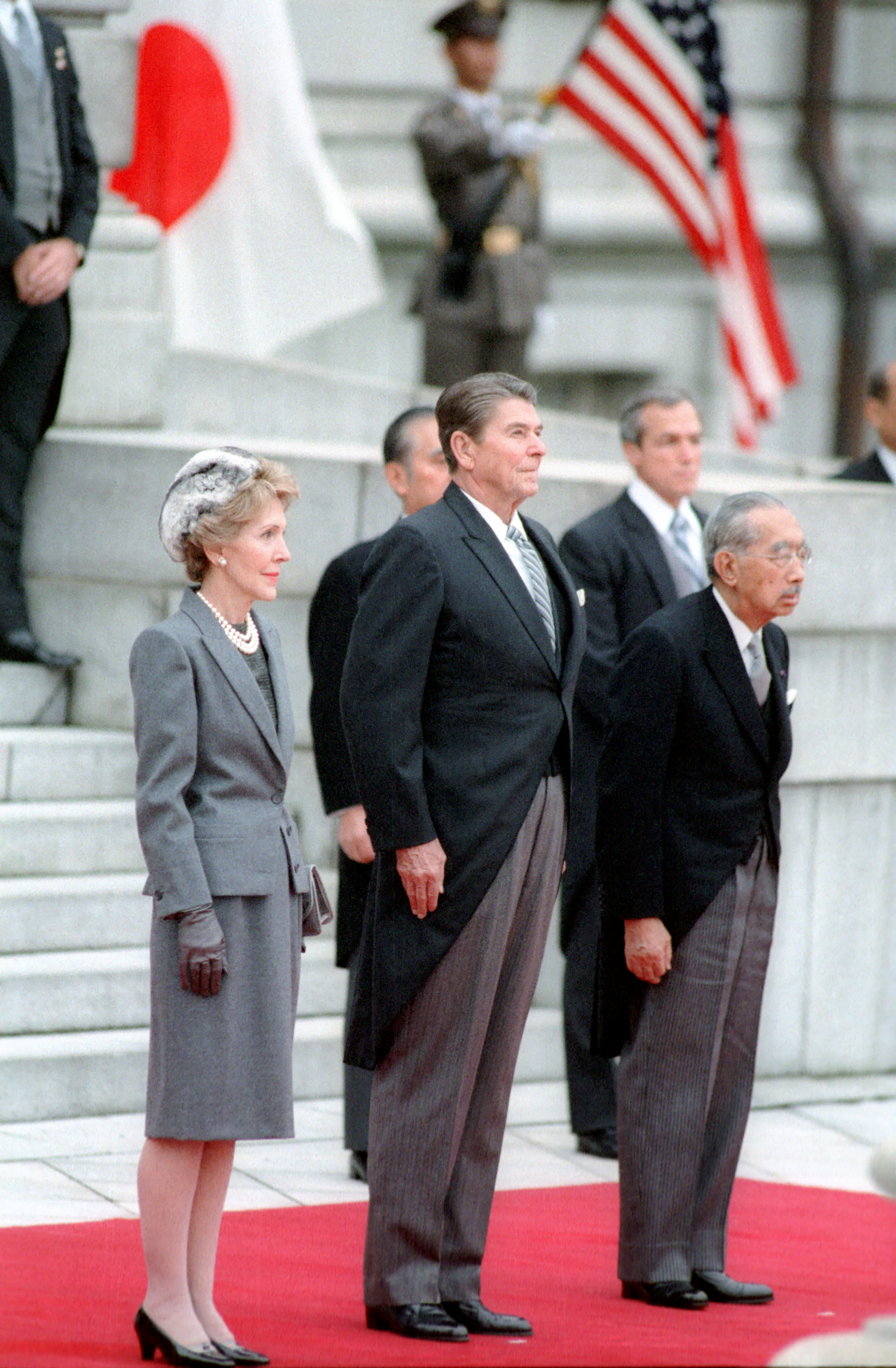
Emperor Hirohito with U.S. President Ronald Reagan and First Lady Nancy Reagan, at Akasaka Palace, Tokyo

On 1 October 1964, Tokaido Shinkansen was the first high-speed rail line in Japan and the oldest high-speed rail system in the world.

On 10 October 1964, Tokyo hosted the 1964 Summer Olympics, opened by Emperor Showa himself. This marked the first time that the Olympic Games were held in Asia and served as replacement for the cancelled 1940 Summer Olympics awarded then to Japan.

In 1968, Japan surpassed West Germany to become the second largest economic power in the world. In the same year, the Ogasawara Islands were returned from US occupation to Japanese sovereignty. Japanese citizens were allowed to return.

By the 1970s, Japan ascended to great power status again. It had the world's second largest economy after the United States. However, its military power was very limited due to pacifist policies and article 9 of the 1947 constitution. This made Japan an abnormal great power.

On 11 February 1970, the first successful launch of the Lambda 4S rocket placed the Japanese Ohsumi satellite on orbit.

On 20 December 1970, the Koza riot was a violent and spontaneous protest against the US military presence in Okinawa.

On 30 September 1971, the Zengakuren demonstrated and rioted in Tokyo against terms for the return of Okinawa from the US to Japanese control. They wanted to remove all American military presence.

On 24 November 1971, the Okinawa Reversion Agreement was ratified and returned the Okinawa Prefecture to Japanese sovereignty.

In 1974, Prime Minister Eisaku Satō was the first Asian to accept the Nobel Peace Prize.

In 1980, Japan became the biggest motor vehicle producing country in the world with 11,042,884 motor vehicles compared to the US's 8,009,841. Japan's rapid economic dominance began to threaten American industries, particularly in automotive and electronics manufacturing. This sparked severe political friction, massive trade deficits, and a wave of "Japan-bashing." Western governments began viewed Japan's trade policies as unfair and overly protectionist. To combat the massive trade deficit, the U.S. forced the Plaza Accord in 1985, which drastically strengthened the Japanese Yen which began to hurt Japan's export-heavy economy and set the stage for their eventual economic crash in the 1990s.

The second half of the 1970s in continental Europe and the beginning of 1980s in the United States of America and other western countries saw the introduction of Japanese anime outside Japan. In the 1990s, Japanese animation slowly gained popularity in the United States.

In 1985, the home video game industry was revitalized by the widespread success of the Nintendo Entertainment System. The success of the NES marked a shift in the dominance of the video game industry from the United States to Japan during the third generation of consoles.

== Legacy ==
Memorials to the era include Shōwa Day, the Showa Memorial Park and National Showa Memorial Museum. There is a phenomenon of Shōwa nostalgia. In the 2020s, there were an increased number of programmes relating to the era, such as Takeda Tetsuya no Shōwa wa kagayaiteita, on the Broadcasting Satellite (BS) television channels. In 2020, a new genus, Showajidaia, and new family, Showajidaiidae, of nudibranch mollusks were named after the era.

== Conversion table ==
To convert any Gregorian calendar year between 1926 and 1989 to Japanese calendar year in Shōwa era, 1925 needs to be subtracted from the year in question.

Shōwa	1	2	3	4	5	6	7	8	9	10	11	12	13	14	15	16
AD	1926	1927	1928	1929	1930	1931	1932	1933	1934	1935	1936	1937	1938	1939	1940	1941
Shōwa	17	18	19	20	21	22	23	24	25	26	27	28	29	30	31	32
AD	1942	1943	1944	1945	1946	1947	1948	1949	1950	1951	1952	1953	1954	1955	1956	1957
Shōwa	33	34	35	36	37	38	39	40	41	42	43	44	45	46	47	48
AD	1958	1959	1960	1961	1962	1963	1964	1965	1966	1967	1968	1969	1970	1971	1972	1973
Shōwa	49	50	51	52	53	54	55	56	57	58	59	60	61	62	63	64
AD	1974	1975	1976	1977	1978	1979	1980	1981	1982	1983	1984	1985	1986	1987	1988	1989

== See also ==
- Hirohito and the Making of Modern Japan
- Japanese resistance during the Shōwa period
- Japan during World War II
- List of Japanese political figures in early Shōwa period
- Shōwa financial crisis
- Shōwa Modan (昭和モダン), referring to the modernization of Japan during the Shōwa era.
- Shōwa nostalgia

Preceded by Taishō (大正)	Era of Japan; Shōwa (昭和); 25 December 1926 – 7 January 1989	Succeeded by Heisei (平成)
