= List of Japanese political figures in early Shōwa period =

List of important political and civil figures during World War II:

- Emperor Hirohito: Emperor of Japan
- Osachi Hamaguchi: Prime Minister
- Tomeo Sagoya: the assassin of Prime Minister Osachi Hamaguchi. He was a member of Aikokusha (Love of Country Association)
- Wakatsuki Reijirō: Prime Minister
- Hara Takashi: Commoner and liberal thinker of the Seiyukai party, came to be Prime Minister
- Kaku Mori: a Parliamentary Vice-Minister of Foreign Affairs
- Yōsuke Matsuoka: Foreign Affairs Minister
- Fumimaro Konoe: Prime Minister, founder of Dobunkai Secret society
- Naotake Satō: himself realizing official duties, Manchukuo and China, some ambassador in Italy and last Ambassador in Soviet Union
- Kanji Kato: an important functionary in the Foreign affairs ministry
- Gotō Shinpei: ex-governor of Taiwan and important supporter of Manchukuo actions
- Noburo Ohtani: president of N.Y.K. Line
- Kishi Shinsuke: a nationalist, industrialist and merchant
- Yakichiro Suma: Spokesman of Foreign Affairs Ministry
- Nobofumi Ito: Chief of Information department
- Koh Ishii: Spokesman of Information department
- Saitō Takao: Member of Diet, opposed to official policy
- Baron Takumo Dan: Chief of Mitsui Banking interest and United States friend
- Kazuo Taoka: nationalist and head of the Yamaguchi-gumi, the largest yakuza syndicate.
- Kenji Osano: Ultranationalist politician and kuromaku.
- Kōki Hirota: member of Genyosha and Black Dragon secret societies, also Foreign Minister, Prime Minister
- Kaoru Ogawa: another member of nationalist societies and right wing believer associated with organized crime
- Ryōhei Uchida: Ultranationalist, founder of Genyosha (Dark Ocean, also Black Ocean) secret society; too right-wing adviser and president of Dai Nippon Seisanto (Japan Production Party) nationalist party.
- Kuzuo Yoshihisa: Right-wing supporter, successor of Ryohei Uchida in leading of Black Dragon Society in 1937.
- Kotaro Hiraoka: another ultranationalist, also a Samurai. Another founder of the Genyosha Secret society.
- Mitsuro Toyama: chief of Black Dragon Society, also founder of Kenkokukai and Roninkai secret groups.
- Kosaburo Tachibana: right-wing follower, founder of Aikyojuku (Native-Land-Loving School) Secret society
- Kakuei Tanaka: Ultranationalist. Former Japanese Prime Minister
- Hisayuki Machii: Ethnic Korean and boss of Toa-kai
- Kakuji Inagawa: another right-wing follower and boss of Inagawa-kai yakuza syndicate.
- Fumio Gotō: chief of Showa Studies Society
- Dr. Shūmei Ōkawa: nationalist ideologist and instructor in Showa Studies Society
- Count Yoriyasu Arima: another "professor" in Showa Studies Society
- Fusanosuke Kuhara: ex-syndicalist, ideologist and right-wing spokesman
- Komakichi Matsuoka: syndicalist and leader of the Worker Federation of Japan industrial Syndicate during the 1940s
- Naoki Hoshino: right-wing and Army civil follower Ideologist
- Ichizō Kobayashi: President of Tokio Gasu Denky (Electric light and Gas Company of Tokyo) and Minister of Commerce and Industry
- Shōzō Murata: president of Osaka Shosen Kaisha, Minister of Communications
- Prince Saionji Kinmochi: last survivor of ancient Genro group, related with Sumitomo Zaibatsu Clan
- Akira Kazami: Ministry of Justice
- Baron Hiranuma Kiichirō: Radical thinker, Home Minister
- Masatsune Ogura: Director of Sumitomo Empress and Finance Minister
- Chikao Fujisawa: member of Diet, supporte of State Shinto laws
- Prince Kan'in Kotohito, supporter of State
- Katsuko Tojo: Tojo's wife and supporter of the implementation of eugenics policies in Japan
- Yoshisuke Aikawa: Industrialist of Nissan Company, also Chief of Manchukuo Industrial Zaibatsu along Japanese Army Establishment
- Toshio Shiratori: radical follower of the Axis powers alliance, first adviser of the Foreign Affairs ministry and ambassador in Italy
- Count Kabayama: moderate and Capitalist diplomat, also United States friend
- Renzo Sawada: ex-ambassador in France
- Juji Kasai: Representative Chamber Member, another Pro-American
- Kensuke Horinouchi: Ambassador in the United States for a short time
- Marquis Okuma: ex-Prime Minister
- Fuji Fujuzawa: Industrialist and foreign merchant in Scrap iron and nationalist government supporter
- Saburō Kurusu: new special ambassador in the United States
- Kaname Wakasugi: aide of Special Ambassador
- Yoshio Kodama: ultranationalist thinker and political personality related with Yakuza groups
- Ryoichi Sasakawa: a right-wing follower and ideology also linked with criminal societies
- Okinori Kaya: nationalist and merchant related with some Yakuza groups

== Military figures in politics ==
- General Kazushige Ugaki: Prime Minister
- General Tanaka Giichi: Prime Minister
- General Hideki Tōjō: Prime Minister, War Minister and Home Minister
- General Sadao Araki: Radical ideologist, founder of Kodoha Party and Minister of Education
- Admiral Makoto Saito: Prime Minister
- Colonel Kingoro Hashimoto: Leader of Imperial Young Federation, Imperial Aid Association and Imperial Farmers Association
- Admiral Mitsumasa Yonai: Prime Minister
- General Nobuyuki Abe: Foreign Affairs Minister
- Lieutenant General Heisuke Yanagawa: Ministry of Justice and leader of the Imperial Aid Association
- Admiral Teijirō Toyoda: Commerce & Industry and Foreign Affairs Minister
- Lieutenant General Seizo Sakonji: Commerce & Industry Minister
- General Kuniaki Koizo: Prime Minister and partidaire of State Shintoism policy
- Admiral Kichisaburō Nomura: military policy, proposed how special ambassador in agreements with the United States
- General Hachirō Arita: ex-Foreign Affairs Minister and military thinker
- Colonel Hideo Iwakuro: member of Army Staaff, right-winger, and diplomatic Army supporter
