= Sakuzō Yoshino =

Japanese academic (1878–1933)

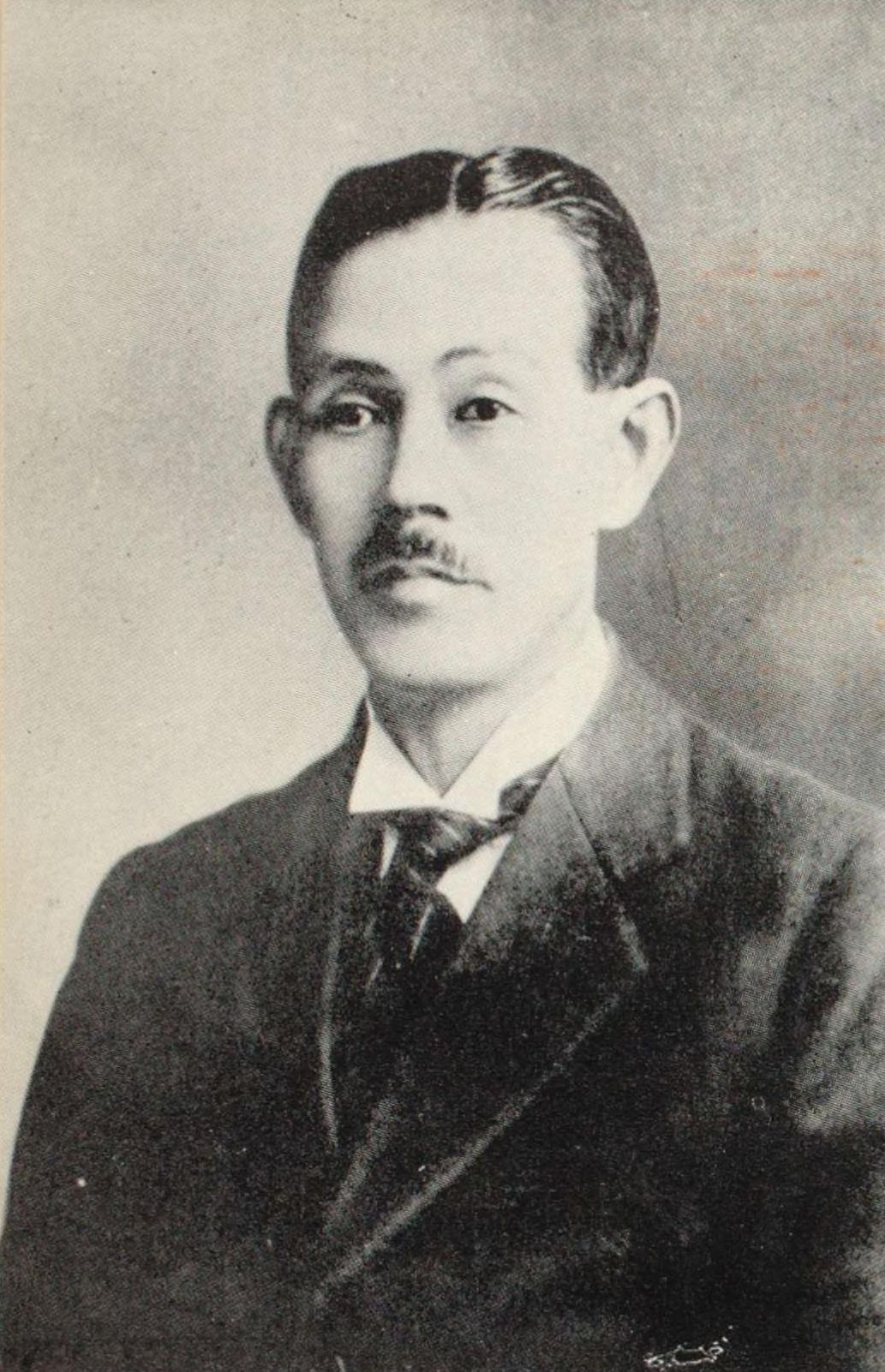
Sakuzō Yoshino

Sakuzō Yoshino (吉野 作造, Yoshino Sakuzō; January 29, 1878 – March 18, 1933) was a Japanese academic, historian, author and professor of political science.

Yoshino was active as a political thinker in the Taishō period. He is best known for his formulation of the theory of "Minponshugi," or politics of the people. He influenced liberal democratic thought in Japan.

== Biography ==
Yoshino was born in Miyagi prefecture in 1878, and entered into Miyagi-Jinjo elementary school (Present-day Sendai Daiichi High School) in 1895. In 1898 he converted to Protestant Christianity. He graduated from Tokyo Imperial University in 1904. In 1906 he went to China as a private tutor for the son of Yuan Shikai, the then dominant Chinese politician. He returned in 1909 and took a position teaching political history and theory in the Faculty of Law at Tokyo Imperial University until 1924. In 1910, he went abroad for three years to study in Germany, Britain and the United States. On his return he began to write articles discussing the problems of implementing democratic government in Japan, such as political corruption and universal suffrage. He published his most famous essays in the noted literary magazine Chūōkōron. Arguably his most significant work, "On the Meaning of Constitutional Government," was written in response to the popular belief in the superiority of the Prussian pattern. In it, Yoshino argued that democracy was compatible with the concept of the emperor's sovereignty. Yoshino also served as the editor of Taiyō, a well-known literary and general interest magazine.

In December 1918, Yoshino joined with others to establish Reimeikai which was a society "to propagate ideas of democracy among the people." This group was formed in order to sponsor public lectures.

== See also ==
- Minpon Shugi

== Works ==
- “‘In the Name of the People’: An Explanation of Politics in Japan in Terms of Sovereign and Populace.” Pacific Affairs 4, no. 3 (1931): 189–200. https://doi.org/10.2307/2750329.
