= Tokuzō Fukuda =

Japanese economist

- 福田徳三
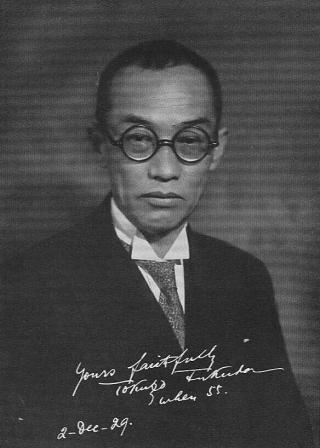
- Born: December 2, 1874; Kanda, Tokyo Prefecture, Empire of Japan
- Died: May 8, 1930 (aged 55); Shinanomachi, Yotsuya, Tokyo City, Empire of Japan
- Education: Doctor of State Economics, Doctor of Law, Ludwig-Maximilians-Universität München
- Occupation: Economist
- Organization: Institute for Business Training
- Awards: Member of the Imperial Academy; Order of the Sacred Treasure, Fourth Rank; Foreign Member, Institut de France; Legion of Honour

Tokuzō Fukuda (福田 徳三 Fukuda Tokuzō; February 12, 1874 – May 8, 1930) was a pioneer of modern Japanese economics.

Fukuda introduced economic theory and economic history for the Social Policy School and the Younger Historical school of economics.

He graduated from the Tokyo Higher School of Commerce (today's Hitotsubashi University). After he was appointed lecturer of his alma mater, he studied in Germany, under Karl Bücher among others in the field, and he earned his doctorate from the Ludwig-Maximilians-Universität München. His thesis dealt with the social and economic development in Japan (original title: Die gesellschaftliche und wirtschaftliche Entwicklung in Japan) and was supervised by Lujo Brentano.

After returning to Japan, he became professor of his alma mater and later at Keiō University.

During the years known as the period of "Taishō Democracy", he joined with others to establish Reimeikai, which was a society "to propagate ideas of democracy among the people." This group was formed in order to sponsor public lectures.

After World War I, he defended democracy, advanced a critique of Marxian theory, and emphasized the solution of social and labour problems by government intervention rather than revolution. He is also considered a pioneer of the contemporary welfare state. As an advisor to the Ministry of Home Affairs, he also worked out policy drafts. He is closely related to the Japanese liberal movement and is considered a social-liberal or social-democrat.

== Economic thought and social policy ==
Fukuda's economic thought was shaped by both the German historical school and British welfare economics. After studying in Germany under Lujo Brentano, he argued that social policy offered a middle course between laissez-faire liberalism and Marxism. In 'A History of Economic Thought in Japan, 1600-1945', Fukuda is described as a liberal advocate of social policy who gave priority to the "people's right to live" over property rights and argued that democracy required the economic security of workers and other people without property. Fukuda also drew on Alfred Marshall, A. C. Pigou and J. A. Hobson, but adapted those influences to Japanese debates over labor unrest, poverty and industrial democracy. Advocating against revolution, he sought to reform capitalism through labor organization, social legislation, and a broader idea of welfare centered on basic needs and quality of life. Nishizawa argues that his emphasis on the combination of "people's life and work" and on a civic minimum helped lay part of the intellectual foundation for the Japanese welfare state.
