= Minpon Shugi =

Proposed form of democracy

Minpon Shugi (Japanese: 民本主義) is a political concept that describes one form of democracy based on monarchical sovereignty. The term minpon shugi originated from Kayahara Kazan (茅原崋山), but is usually credited to Yoshino Sakuzō (吉野作造), the Taisho-era political scientist who developed the concept. (Note: However, Yoshino stated: "I did not really believe that is a suitable word" and "I just used it because many people had already used the word".) Importantly, Yoshino claimed that Minpon Shugi does not violate the imperial institution. This school of thought impacted Taishō Democracy and the general election law, and became widely accepted by people who were passionate to see a better political system in early 20th-century Japan.

== Description ==
Minpon Shugi is one form of democracy that the political scientist Yoshino Sakuzō put forward in the book Kensei no hongi o toite sono yushu no bi o nasu no michi o ronzu (憲政の本義を説いて其有終の美を済すの途を論ず). Yoshino defined Minpon Shugi as "the policy in exercising political power of valuing the profit, happiness, and opinions of the people". This has two main points:

First, "the ultimate end of the exercise of political power should be the good of the people". In the ancient world, people were treated as just tools for the survival, prosperity, and authority of powerful politicians. Since the Middle Age, politics centered around the warrior class, with commoners serving as just a foundation. Even though some politicians at that time, such as Arai Hakuseki, argued the necessity of love for the people, it was only for the sake of the upper classes. These structural ideas that sacrifice the human dignity for the interests of a few powerful people, Yoshino argued, were awful and should be rejected.

Second, "in the final determination of policies, the people's opinions must be valued highly". People should decide the purpose of politics, because people can better understand what is good for the people in general.

== Differences between Minshu Shugi and Minpon Shugi ==
There are multiple possible translations of "democracy" in Japanese. Most people translate "democracy" as minshu shugi (民主主義); Japan currently follows a Minshu Shugi political system. However, at the time of Yoshino's writing, Minshu Shugi was thought to be contravened due to incompatibility with the imperial system. Because the Dai-Nippon Teikoku Kenpō (大日本帝国憲法) (Meiji Constitution) specified constitutional monarchy, people criticized it, saying that "democracy" entails sovereignty of the people.

Yoshino stated that there are at least two meanings of "democracy": (1) "in law the sovereignty of the nation resides in the people", and (2) "in politics the fundamental end of the exercise of the nation’s sovereignty should be the people". He considered Minpon Shugi to be a translation of the second meaning, and therefore different from Minshu Shugi, the first meaning. One of the most important elements of Minpon Shugi is that Yoshino flexibly adapted "democracy" to Japanese society at that time. The most crucial difference between Minshu Shugi and Minpon Shugi is the definition of where sovereignty lies.

=== Terminology ===
The logographic difference between Minshu Shugi (民主主義) and Minpon Shugi (民本主義) are the characters 主 [shu] and 本 [pon]. 主 [shu] means both "the first concern" and "sovereignty", represented by the same Chinese character in Japanese, and 本 [pon] means "the base". So, translating directly from the kanji, Minshu Shugi means "the principle that sovereignty resides with the people", and Minpon Shugi means "the principle that the people form the base".

=== Minshu Shugi ===
In Yoshino's theory of Minshu Shugi, democracy is based on popular sovereignty, and comes in two forms: (1) absolute popular sovereignty, and (2) popular sovereignty by mutual consent. The first form was defined as sovereignty naturally lying with the people. This standpoint denies the monarchical system because it would mean the monarch derived authority from the people. Yoshino considered it to be clear that this form of Minshu Shugi was a dangerous concept. In the second form, popular sovereignty has been decided by interpretation of a constitution. Yoshino considered that this form may not be evil because it does not reject the monarchical system.

However, both kinds of Minshu Shugi have a problem with where they placed sovereignty. At the time of Yoshino's writing, Japan was an imperial system, and these definitions of sovereignty were incompatible with that system.

=== Minpon Shugi ===
On the other hand, Minpon Shugi (democracy based on monarchical sovereignty) "is not contingent on where legal theory locates sovereignty". This means the emperor can retain sovereignty. Therefore, the principle of Minpon Shugi does not clash with the monarchical system.

== Criticism ==
=== Minpon Shugi ===
When Yoshino was writing his articles, there were some criticisms against Minpon Shugi. Yoshino selected some of those opinions and refuted them in his writing. At first, people castigated the idea of Minpon Shugi itself. Yoshino argued that some people do not distinguish between Minpon Shugi and Minshu Shugi. Also, Yoshino said that "it's true that the history of constitutional government is full of revolutions" in response to critics who claimed Minpon Shugi was allied with Minshu Shugi and was incompatible with monarchy because it has revolutionary tendencies. However, he added, "regardless of the revolutionary origins, trying to get rid of them is wrong" because "progress requires strenuous effort".

=== Objective of the political system ===
Some also felt apprehensive about the foundations of Yoshino's Minpon Shugi. Some pointed out that the principle "the goal of politics is the good of the people in general", would go against the Japanese spirit of loyalty due to conflict between the good of the Imperial Family and the good of the people. However, Yoshino claimed there is no contradiction between the Imperial Family's interests and the good of the people because there is only one Imperial Family in Japan and it does not conflict with the interests of the people. Even if it were to come into conflict with the Imperial Family's interests, Minpon Shugi just makes a statement about the general policy of the sovereign, it does not lay down a rigid law. Moreover, he claimed that the sovereign should treat the people in a good way in general, so the only people who would disagree are the privileged ones.

=== Political decision-making ===
Critics suggested that Yoshino's statement, "policies should be decided with input from the people's opinion", goes against the spirit of the monarchist constitution. Yoshino rebutted this criticism, and said it was also due to misunderstanding. The sovereign still has full sovereignty in law. Minpon Shugi only describes the policy of the sovereign in the exercise of its sovereignty. Some criticized Minpon Shugi for imposing restrictions on the actions of the sovereign. Yoshino refuted this criticism, saying "the actions of the sovereign have already been restricted, since the Constitution is a limitation", and "limitations are in fact desirable and moral".

Furthermore, some well-educated men claimed that people in general were not intelligent enough to join politics. Yoshino said because of educational progress, the intelligence of the people had become quite high. Additionally, people just need to have some common sense to make decisions; they were not being asked to create new policy.

There was a belief that the general will (the will of the people) does not exist, or that it does not actively move in one direction; however, Yoshino proposed that it does exist, and while it may be swayed, the essential direction is the same.

=== Criticism after Yoshino's writing ===
After Yoshino's book, On the Meaning of Constitutional Government and the Method by which it can be Perfected, several socialists such as Ōsugi Sakae and Yamakawa Hitoshi criticized Yoshino's ideas. Ōsugi Sakae strongly opposed these ideas, saying: "Everywhere it's vague. It's full of contradictions. It's incoherent." They particularly criticized how Yoshino separated "place of sovereignty" and "exercise of sovereignty".
