= Yūzonsha =

Japanese nationalist organization (1919–1923)

The Yūzonsha (猶存社; Society of Those Who Yet Remain) was a radical Japanese nationalist pan-Asianist organization founded in August 1919. The group arose from a pre-existing debate society, the Rōsōkai (Old and Young Society), which was founded in October 1918 by Mitsukawa Kametarō, editor of Dai Nihon (Greater Japan). Though the Rōsōkai was not explicitly pan-Asianist, or indeed political in its focus, its membership included many leading pan-Asianists and political commentators.

Dissatisfied with the overly non-political nature of the Rōsōkai, Ōkawa Shūmei and Mitsukawa Kametarō elected to form the Yūzonsha on 8 August 1919. This organization had a clear pan-Asianist reformist agenda, and included prominent members such as Kanokogi Kazunobu, Nunami Takeo, Kasagi Yoshiaki, Shimonaka Yasaburō, Kanauchi Ryōsuke, Ayakawa Takeji, Yasuoka Masahiro, Shimizu Kōnosuke, Iwata Fumio and Nishida Mitsugi.

Mitsukawa and Ōkawa asked the radical pan-Asianist Kita Ikki, author of the quasi-totalitarian Kokka Kaizō Hōan Daikō (A Plan for National Reconstruction), to provide ideological leadership. Though he agreed to do so, moving to the organization's headquarters, he largely remained aloof from the organization; which did take on some of his ideology and was involved in illegally circulating copies of his banned work.

The organization launched a monthly journal, Otakebi (War Cry) in August 1920, but published only three issues before ceasing publication; equally unsuccessful were its attempts to publish books, and only a few pamphlets were produced.

Yūzonsha advocated Esperanto, rather than Japanese, as the language of the Pan-Asian unit. The leaders of the organization argued that making Esperanto the lingua franca would greatly facilitate achieving unity among the peoples of Asia.

It was involved in a couple of political campaigns, notably a successful one to prevent the annulment of Hirohito's engagement to Princess Kuni Nagako, and an unsuccessful campaign to prevent his 1921 tour of Europe. The group eventually dissolved in 1923, alongside the Rōsōkai after disagreements between Kita and Ōkawa, particularly over Russo-Japanese relations.

== Sources ==
- Szpilman, Christopher W.A. (2011). "The Yuzonsha's "War Cry," 1920". In Saaler, Sven; Szpilman, Christopher W.A. (eds.). Pan-Asianism : a documentary history, volume 2. Lanham, Md.: Rowman & Littlefield. pp. 55–60. ISBN 978-1-4422-0602-1.
