= Roninkai =

The Rōninkai (浪人会, "The Society of Masterless Samurai") was a Japanese ultra-nationalist anti-democratic political group that shared many of its members with the similar organization Genyosha and the Black Dragon Society. It was founded by Tanaka Hiroyuki in 1908. Tōyama Mitsuru, Miura Gorō, Yukio Ozaki, Kazuo Kojima, Ryūsuke Miyasake, and Ryōhei Uchida were among its members.
