= Kawashima Yoshiko (film) =

1990 Hong Kong film by Eddie Fong

- Film poster
- Traditional Chinese: 川島芳子
- Simplified Chinese: 川岛芳子
- Hanyu Pinyin: Chuān Dǎo Fāng Zǐ
- Jyutping: Cyun1 Dou2 Fong1 Zi2
- Directed by: Eddie Fong
- Screenplay by: Lilian Lee
- Produced by: Teddy Robin
- Starring: Anita Mui; Andy Lau; Patrick Tse; Derek Yee
- Cinematography: Jingle Ma
- Edited by: Henry Cheung
- Music by: Jim Sam
- Production company: Paragon Films
- Distributed by: Golden Harvest
- Release date: 28 July 1990
- Running time: 105 minutes
- Country: Hong Kong
- Language: Cantonese
- Box office: HK$11,798,844

Kawashima Yoshiko (in Chinese 川島芳子) is a 1990 Hong Kong biographical drama film directed by Eddie Fong based on the life of Yoshiko Kawashima, a Manchu princess who was brought up as a Japanese and served as a spy in the service of the Japanese Kwantung Army and Manchukuo during the Second World War. The film stars Anita Mui as Kawashima, Andy Lau, Patrick Tse and Derek Yee.

== Plot ==
Yoshiko Kawashima is the 14th princess of Prince Su of the Qing dynasty. In order to revive Manchu culture, Prince Su sent Yoshiko to Japan to be trained as a spy by Naniwa Kawashima, who also deprived Yoshiko of her virginity. Yoshiko was ordered to marry a Mongol prince, although the marriage was a failure. After breaking with Naniwa, Yoshiko went to Shanghai and, with her beauty and leverage, she attaches herself to Japanese general Tanaka Takayoshi and helps Puyi establish Manchukuo in Xinjing. She becomes a commander of a Manchukuo army unit and a Japanese spy, seeking revenge on revolutionaries. But upon seeing her former lover Cloud, who became a revolutionary, being arrested for assassinating Takayoshi, Yoshiko has a change of mind. But a crisis will ensue. At the end of the war, Kawashima is executed, aged 42.

== Cast ==
- Anita Mui as Yoshiko Kawashima, also known as Kam Bik-fai(Jin Bihui)
- Andy Lau as Fook / Cloud
- Patrick Tse as Commander Tanaka Takayoshi
- Derek Yee as Amakasu Masahiko/ Wong Ka Hung
- Idy Chan as Empress Wan Jung
- Lawrence Ng as Lam
- Matthew Wong as Ganzhu'erzhabu 'Ganjuurjab'
- Ken Lo as Tanaka'a aide
- Pau Fong as Advocate Lee (Yoshiko's lawyer)
- Kam Piu as Prosecutor at Yoshiko's trial
- Tin Ching as Judge at Yoshiko's trial
- Sze Mei Yee as Emperor Puyi
- Blackie Ko
- Wai Ching
- Chow Suk Yee as Chizuko (Yoshiko's aide)
- Ho Chi Moon as Yoshiko's party guest

== Box office ==
The film grossed HK$11,798,844 at the Hong Kong box office during its theatrical run from 28 July to 23 August 1990.

== Award nominations ==
- 12th Hong Kong Film Awards
  - Nominated: Best Supporting Actor (Derek Yee)
  - Nominated: Best Cinematography (Jingle Ma)
  - Nominated: Best Art Direction (Eddie Mok, Fang Ying)
- 27th Golden Horse Awards
  - Nominated: Best Supporting Actor (Andy Lau)
