= Bibliography of works on wartime cross-dressing =

This is a list of works on the subject of wartime cross-dressing.

== List ==
=== General ===
- Krimmer, Elisabeth (2003). In the Company of Men: Cross-dressed Women Around 1800. Kritik: German Literary Theory and Cultural Studies. Wayne State University Press. ISBN 0814331459 – via Google Books.
- Hacker, Barton; Vinning, Margaret (2012). A Companion to Women's Military History. History of Warfare. Brill. ISBN 978-9004212176 – via Google Books.
- Goldstein, Joshua S. (2003). War and Gender: How Gender Shapes the War System and Vice Versa. Cambridge University Press. ISBN 978-0521001809 – via Google Books.
- Usandizaga, Aránzazu; Monnickendam, Andrew (2001). Dressing Up For War: Transformations of Gender and Genre in the Discourse and Literature of War. Rodopi Perspectives on Modern Literature. Brill Rodopi. ISBN 978-9042013575 – via Google Books.
- Damman, Martin; Prinzhorn, Martin (2018). Soldier Studies: Cross-Dressing in the Wehrmacht. Hatje Cantz. ISBN 978-3775744836.
- Dugaw, Dianne (1996). Warrior Women and Popular Balladry, 1650-1850. University of Chicago Press. ISBN 978-0226169163 – via Google Books.
- Grant DePauw, Linda (2000). Battle Cries and Lullabies: Women in War from Prehistory to the Present. University of Oklahoma Press. ISBN 978-0806132884 – via Google Books.
- Wheelwright, Julie (1989). Amazons and Military Maids: Women Who Dressed as Men in the Pursuit of Life, Liberty and Happiness. Pandora. ISBN 978-0044403562 – via Google Books.
- The Female Soldier, Or, The Surprising Life and Adventures of Hannah Snell. William Andrews Clark Memorial Library. 1989 – via Google Books.
- Snell, Hannah; Anonymous (2011). The Female Soldier: Two Accounts of Women Who Served & Fought as Men. Leonaur Ltd. ISBN 978-0857066763.
- Embser-Herbert, Melissa Sheridan (1998). Camouflage Isn't Only for Combat: Gender, Sexuality, and Women in the Military. New York University Press. ISBN 978-0814735480.
- Birnbaum, Phyllis (2015). Manchu Princess, Japanese Spy: The Story of Kawashima Yoshiko, the Cross-Dressing Spy Who Commanded Her Own Army. Asia Perspectives: History, Society, and Culture. Columbia University Press. ISBN 978-0231152181.

=== United States ===
==== American Civil War ====
- Cooper, Hilary Roxanne Godette (2006). Cross-dressing Confederates and Unsexed Unionists: Women Soldiers in Disguise as Men in the American Civil War. University of North Carolina.
- Blanton, DeAnne; Cook Wike, Lauren (2003). They Fought Like Demons: Women Soldiers in the American Civil War (2nd ed.). Vintage. ISBN 978-1400033157 – via Google Books.
- Cook Burgess, Lauren; Wakeman, Sarah (1996). An Uncommon Soldier: The Civil War Letters of Sarah Rosetta Wakeman, alias Pvt. Lyons Wakeman, 153rd Regiment, New York State Volunteers, 1862-1864. Oxford University Press. ISBN 978-0195102437.
- Velazquez, Loreta (2003). The Woman in Battle: The Civil War Narrative of Loreta Janeta Velazques, Cuban Woman and Confederate Soldier. Wisconsin Studies in Autobiography. University of Wisconsin Press. ISBN 978-0299194246 – via Google Books.
- Sears, Clare (2005). "A Dress Not Belonging to His Or Her Sex": Cross-dressing Law in San Francisco, 1860-1900. University of California – via Google Books.
- Female Wartime Crossdressers in the American Civil War. General Books LLC. 2012. ISBN 978-1234663421 – via Google Books.
- Monson, Marianne (2018). Women of the Blue and Gray: True Stories of Mothers, Medics, Soldiers, and Spies of the Civil War. Shadow Mountain. ISBN 978-1629724157.
- Harriel, Shelby (2019). Behind the Rifle: Women Soldiers in Civil War Mississippi. University Press of Mississippi. ISBN 978-1496822017.
- McPherson, Marcus (2015). Women Soldiers in the Civil War: 26 True Stories of Female Soldiers Who Fought in the Bloodiest American War. Amazon Digital Services LLC.
- Tsui, Bonnie (2006). She Went to the Field: Women Soldiers of the Civil War (First ed.). TwoDot. ISBN 978-0762743841.
- Silvey, Anita (2008). I'll Pass For Your Comrade: Women Soldiers in the Civil War. Clarion Books. ISBN 978-0618574919.
- Reit, Seymour (2001). Behind Rebel Lines: The Incredible Story of Emma Edmonds, Civil War Spy. Great Episodes. HMH Books for Young Readers. ISBN 978-0152164270.
- Cordell, M. R. (2016). Courageous Women of the Civil War: Soldiers, Spies, Medics, and More. Women of Action. Chicago Review Press. ISBN 978-1613732007.
- Leonard, Elizabeth D. (1999). All the Daring of the Soldier: Women of the Civil War Armies. W. W. Norton & Company. ISBN 978-0393335477.
- Middleton, Lee (1993). Hearts of Fire-- Soldier Women of the Civil War: With an Addendum on Female Reenactors. Vol. 1. University of Wisconsin - Madison. ISBN 978-1882755004 – via Google Books.
- Hall, Richard (1993). Patriots in Disguise: Women Warriors of the Civil War. Paragon House. ISBN 978-1557784384 – via Internet Archive.
- Eggleston, Larry G. (2003). Women in the Civil War: Extraordinary Stories of Soldiers, Spies, Nurses, Doctors, Crusaders, and Others. McFarland. ISBN 978-0786414932.
- Hall, Richard (2006). Women on the Civil War Battlefront. University Press of Kansas. ISBN 978-0700614370 – via Google Books.
- Ford, Carin T. (2013). Women of the Civil War Through Primary Sources. Enslow Pub Inc. ISBN 978-0766041288 – via Google Books.
- Gansler, Laura (2007). The Mysterious Private Thompson: The Double Life of Sarah Emma Edmonds, Civil War Soldier. Bison Books. ISBN 978-0803259881.

==== Others ====
- Cohen, Daniel A. (1998). "The Female Marine" and Related Works: Narratives of Cross-Dressing and Urban Vice in America's Early Republic. University of Massachusetts Press. ISBN 978-1558491243 – via Google Books.
- Cohen, Daniel A (1994). The "Female marine" in an era of good feelings: Cross dressing and the "genius" of Nathaniel Coverly, Jr. American Antiquarian Society. ISBN 978-0944026519.
- Kneib, Martha (2004). Women Soldiers, Spies, and Patriots of the American Revolution. American Women at War. Rosen Pub Group. ISBN 978-0823944545 – via Google Books.
- Enss, Chris; Chartier, JoAnn (2016). Soldier, Sister, Spy, Scout: Women Soldiers and Patriots on the Western Frontier. Two Dot Books. ISBN 978-1493023394.
- Young, Alfred F. (2004). Masquerade: The Life and Times of Deborah Sampson, Continental Soldier. Knopf. ISBN 978-0679441656.

== See also ==
- List of wartime cross-dressers
- Soldier Studies: Cross-Dressing in the Wehrmacht
- The Female Marine
- Bibliography of works on the United States military and LGBT+ topics
