= Lucy Brewer =

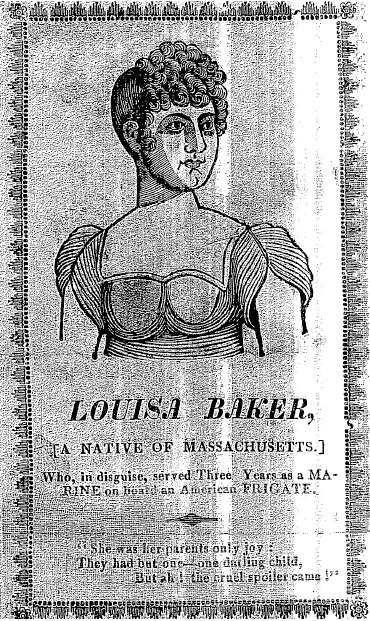
- A drawing supposedly of Lucy Brewer
- Military career
- Allegiance: United States
- Branch: United States Marine Corps
- Service years: 1812–1815
- Unit: USS Constitution
- Conflicts: War of 1812

Lucy Brewer (also known as Eliza Bowen or Louisa Baker) is the pen name of a writer who purported to be the first woman in the United States Marines, serving aboard USS Constitution as a sharpshooter. Brewer's adventures were probably written by Nathaniel Hill Wright (1787–1824) or Wright's publisher, Nathaniel Coverly.

== The legend ==
According to "her" book The Female Marine (original title: The Adventures of Lucy Brewer), Brewer supposedly grew up on a farm near Plymouth, Massachusetts and, at age 16, fell in love with a boy named Henry. When she became pregnant, Henry refused to marry her, and she set out for Boston. In Boston, Lucy was tricked into prostitution after her baby died in childbirth. This series of seduction and betrayal precisely follows the strict line of the romance genre—until, that is, motivated by a patriotic desire to fight in the War of 1812, Brewer tricked her way onto the American frigate USS Constitution, pretending to be a man named George Baker.

She served valiantly for three years and in many naval battles against the British before being honorably discharged, all the while keeping her true gender a secret. The book ends with Lucy returning to Plymouth as a woman and settling down into traditional married life. "She displays resourcefulness, self-reliance, and mobility—characteristics commonly deemed male that this female marine appropriates to deal with her extraordinary predicament," Elizabeth Reis notes. In the end, though, "All's well that ends well in The Female Marine, as characters revert to their true natures, aligned with prescribed categories of gender and sex. The chaotic world of gender impersonation settles into one of blissful morality, and Lucy accepts the conventions of the cult of true womanhood."

No one by the name of Lucy Brewer (or that of her other pseudonyms, or that of her husband) can be found in historical records; in addition, it is highly unlikely a woman could have disguised herself for three years on Constitution, as the crew had little to no privacy (for example, no toilet facilities or private quarters existed on the ship, and physical examinations were thorough in the Marines). In addition, The Female Marine's identifying details of Constitution's travels and battles are nearly verbatim to accounts published by the ship's commanders in contemporary newspapers.

In 1816, shortly after the publication of the first edition of The Female Marine, a woman named Rachel Sperry, claiming to have run the brothel into which Brewer was supposedly tricked, wrote "A Brief Reply" to Brewer's tale. Sperry wanted "to give her all the praise to which she is entitled, in justice to her" military exploits, but claimed that rather than being tricked into prostitution, Brewer made "rapid progress in all the deceptive arts of harlotry" – deceptive arts, she implies, that served her well in tricking her way onto Constitution. Rachel Sperry has no more historical record than Brewer, but the publication of "her" "Brief Reply" both spurred public interest in and gave weight to the legitimacy and veracity of The Female Marine. As recently as 1963, in fact, the story was regarded as factual by some accounts. (Note: By Edward Rowe Snow, for example, in Unsolved Mysteries of Sea and Shore, which even has a photograph of a woman supposed to be Lucy Brewer.)

== Beyond the legend ==
According to Daniel A. Cohen, editor of The Female Marine and Related Works: Narratives of Cross-Dressing and Urban Vice in America's Early Republic, the true author of The Female Marine was probably Nathaniel Hill Wright. Wright was a young Massachusetts writer acquainted with Nathaniel Coverly, the printer of The Female Marine. Cohen writes:

At the time of the first appearance of The Female Marine, Nathaniel Hill Wright was in his late twenties, a family man with a wife and at least one small child, evidently struggling to make ends meet. While none of this proves that Wright was the author of the female-marine narratives, his political affiliation, sexual history [his wife bore a child sixth months after their marriage], literary predilections, self-characterization, and personal circumstances – along with the newspaper reference identifying "Mr. Wright" as Coverly's hack – all tend to make him a very plausible candidate.

Joan Druett writes that "Coverly could have been inspired by a fellow opportunist, Robert Kirby of London," who published the tale of Mary Anne Talbot, an Englishwoman who served as a man in the Napoleonic wars. In spite of their dubious authenticity, the books became extremely popular (Coverly also published the story of Almira Paul, a figure similar to Lucy Brewer, who is probably also fictional). At least 19 editions of The Female Marine were published between 1815 and 1818. The books were aimed at sailors, prostitutes, and (in particular) "juveniles." Surviving copies, when signed, mostly bear the names of women, and are "typically worn and tattered – suggesting that many of the modest volumes were literally read to pieces by their eager purchasers."

Alexander Medlicott notes that The Female Marine is the "first American novel to employ a woman warrior as the focal point of the action" – though the History of Constantius and Pulchera; or, Virtue rewarded bears small similarities. Although Constantius and Pulchera was published anonymously in 1795, an 1831 edition included a poem by Nathaniel Hill Wright, and is often listed in library catalogs as, including the Constantius and Pulchera novel, being authored by Wright.

The official first female Marine was Opha May Johnson, though in 2001, a Marines message honored the achievements of women in the Marine Corps who form a "unique lineage [that] can trace its roots back to Lucy Brewer, the legendary woman who served aboard the USS Constitution during the War of 1812."

== See also ==
- Category:Women in the United States Marine Corps
- Opha May Johnson
- Margaret A. Brewer
