= Soldier Studies =

Soldier Studies: Cross-Dressing in the Wehrmacht
- Author: Martin Damman
- Language: German
- Subject: War
- Genre: Non-fiction
- Published: 2018
- Publisher: Hatje Cantz
- Publication place: Germany
- Pages: 127

Soldier Studies: Cross-Dressing in the Wehrmacht is a 2018 book by Martin Damman about cross-dressing male soldiers in the German armed forces during the Nazi period.

== History ==
The book features a compilation of images with little text.

== See also ==
- Wartime cross-dressing
- Bibliography of works on wartime cross-dressing
