= Naniwa Kawashima =

Japanese ronin (1865–1949)

- 川島浪速
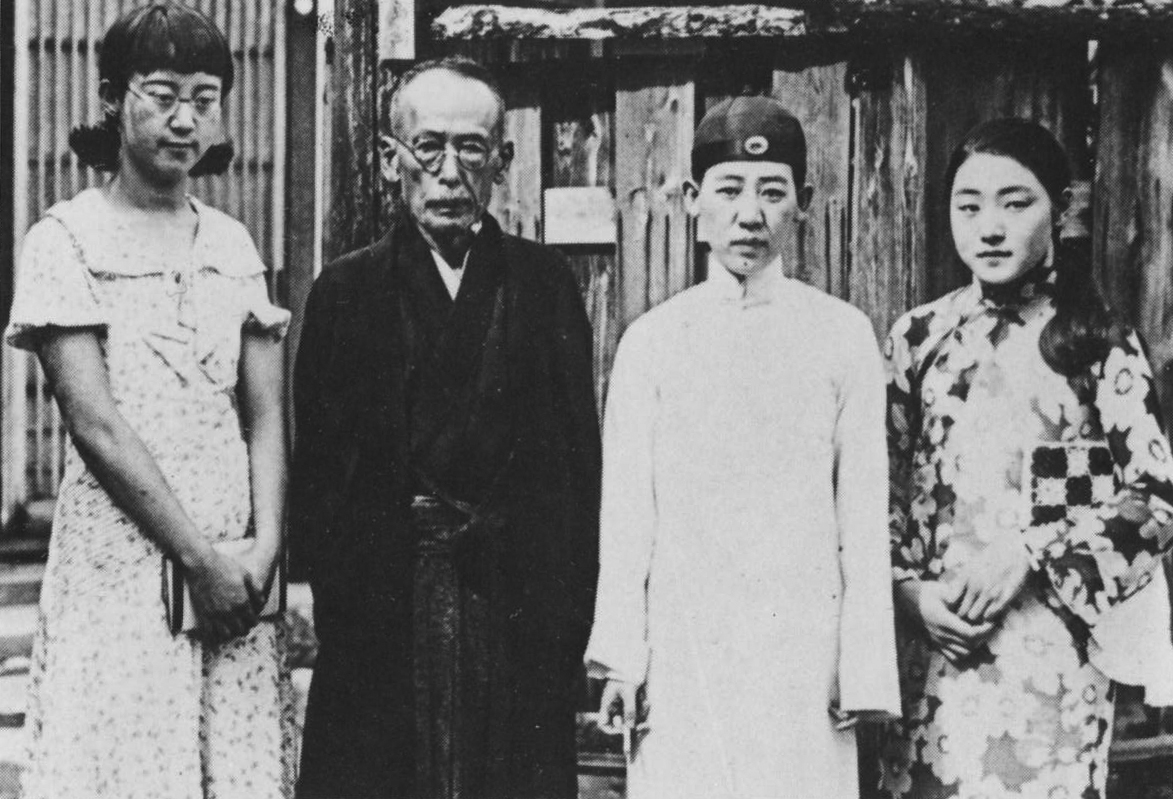
- Renko Kawashima, Naniwa Kawashima (second from left), Yoshiko Kawashima, and Chizuko (Yoshiko's secretary) in Matsumoto.
- Born: 23 January 1866
- Died: 14 June 1949 (aged 83)

Naniwa Kawashima (Japanese: 川島浪速; Kawashima Naniwa; 1865–1949) was a Japanese continental rōnin, known for his activities supporting the Qing dynasty. He was the foster father of the Japanese spy Kawashima Yoshiko, who was the biological child of the Manchu Prince Su Shanqi.

== Biography ==
=== Early life and service in China ===
Kawashima Naniwa was born on 23 January 1866, to a samurai family in the castle town of Matsumoto in Shinano Province. In 1882, he enrolled at the Tokyo School of Foreign Languages and studied Chinese. He left school in 1885 and began traveling in China. Kawashima returned to Japan due to illness in 1889.

Kawashima followed the Japanese army as an interpreter in the First Sino-Japanese War in 1894. After the Japanese victory he worked for the Government-General of Taiwan, before returning to Japan in 1897 to serve as a Chinese teacher at the Army Academy and Tokyo Higher Normal School.

In August 1900, Kawashima again went to China as an interpreter with the Japanese contingent of the Eight-Nation Alliance forces during the Boxer Rebellion. He was also made a civilian official in the military police section. After the allied forces occupied Beijing, he was charged with training police officers among the Chinese. Upon the reversion of control to the Qing government, they left this police force intact and contracted Kawashima to help create a modern police organisation. Kawashima organised a police academy in Beijing and served as its principal. Kawashima became a close friend of Shanqi, the 10th Prince Su, who was chief of the new police force, and later interior minister.

=== Manchu-Mongol independence movement ===
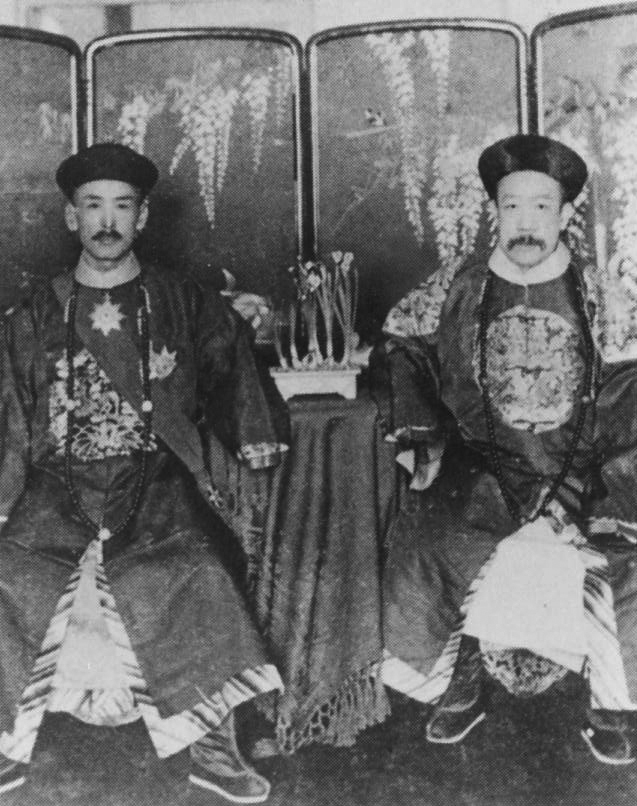
Kawashima (left) with Prince Su Shanqi (right)

After the 1911 Revolution and the abdication of the Xuantong Emperor in 1912, Kawashima helped Prince Su and his family flee to Port Arthur in the Kwantung Leased Territory. The Prince became a leading figure of the Royalist Party, which sought to restore the Qing dynasty. Kawashima was Prince Su's intermediary with the Japanese. Kawashima and Prince Su envisioned a plan in which an uprising would establish an independent Manchu-Mongol state under the Qing dynasty with Japanese support. The plan had support within the Japanese Army, particularly in the Kwantung Garrison, but was opposed by the Ministry of Foreign Affairs. The plan fell apart when the Japanese government decided it was safer to support President Yuan Shikai.

The movement for a Manchu-Mongol state was revived in 1916, as Yuan had fallen out of favour with the Japanese government. With the tacit approval of the cabinet, the Army General Staff supported the activities of Kawashima in order to undermine Yuan. Kawashima incorporated an uprising by the Mongol Prince Babojab into his broader plan. The cause received funds from the businessman Ōkura Kihachirō among others, which were used to supply Babojab's army and to raise additional forces under Prince Su, consisting of Qing loyalists, Japanese volunteers and mercenary brigands.

After the death of Yuan Shikai in June 1916, the Japanese cabinet decided to support his successor Li Yuanhong, leading the army to withdraw support for Manchu-Mongol independence. Kawashima reluctantly agreed to call off the plan and the forces under Prince Su were dispersed, their arms confiscated by Kwangtung Government. Babojab would be killed in battle against the Chinese army in October 1916.

=== Later life ===
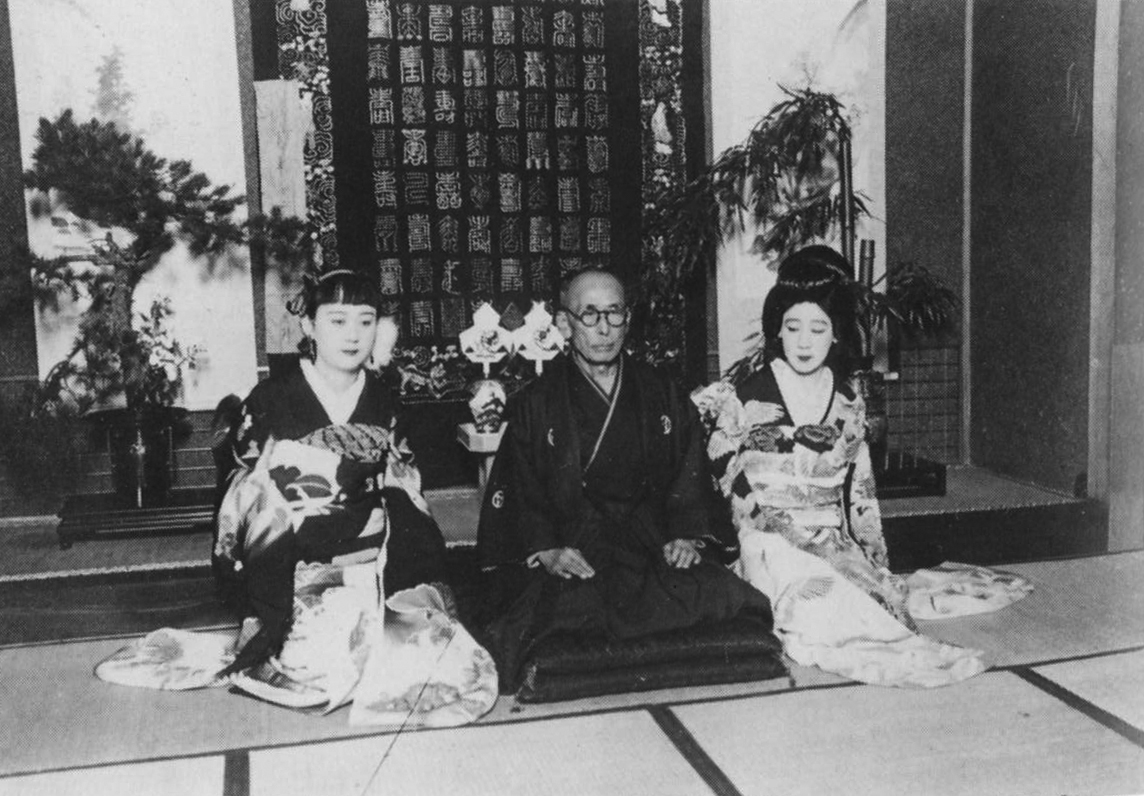
Kawashima on his seventieth birthday, with Renko (left) and Yoshiko (right)

Although their plans had failed, Kawashima and the Prince Su continued to have a close relationship. In 1915, Prince Su had sent his 35th child, the eight-year old Xianyu to be fostered by Kawashima in Japan. Kawashima raised Xianyu as his own and gave them the Japanese name Kawashima Yoshiko. Several other members of the Su family lived in the Kawashima household for periods of time and were educated in Japan. A daughter of the Prince's eldest son was adopted by Kawashima and given the name Renko. Kawashima also saw to the education of Babojab's orphaned children.

When Prince Su Shanqi died in 1922, Kawashima took over the affairs of the Su family and its assets, apparently on the basis of the Prince's will. Some descendants of the Prince Su have accused Kawashima of using these powers for personal gain.

In 1925, Kawashima's foster daughter Yoshiko shaved their hair and began wearing male clothes, declaring their intention to "cease being a woman." Some biographers have ascribed Yoshiko's decision to alleged sexual abuse by Naniwa, though this interpretation is controversial. Kawashima Yoshiko later became famous as a spy for the Japanese Army in the 1930s.

Kawashima died on 14 June 1949.

== Bibliography ==
- Birnbaum, Phyllis (2015). Manchu Princess, Japanese Spy: The Story of Kawashima Yoshiko, the Cross-Dressing Spy Who Commanded Her Own Army. Asia Perspectives: History, Society, and Culture. Columbia University Press. ISBN 9780231152181.
- Reynolds, Douglas R. (1993). China, 1898-1912: The Xinzheng Revolution and Japan. Cambridge, Massachusetts: Harvard University Asia Center. ISBN 0-674-11660-7.
- Valliant, Robert B. (1972). "Japanese Involvement in Mongol Independence Movements, 1912-1919". The Mongolia Society Bulletin. 11 (2): 1–32. JSTOR 43192993.
- Orbach, Danny (2019). "The Military-Adventurous Complex: Officers, adventurers, and Japanese expansion in East Asia, 1884–1937". Modern Asian Studies. 53 (2). Cambridge University Press: 339–376.
- Kleeman, Faye Yuan (2014). In Transit: The Formation of a Colonial East Asian Cultural Sphere. University of Hawaii Press. ISBN 978-0-8248-3861-4.
