= Bibliography of works on the United States military and LGBTQ topics =

Bibliography of works on the United States military and LGBT+ topics is a list of non-fiction literary works on the subject of the United States Armed Forces and LGBT+ subjects. LGBT+ includes any types of people which may be considered "Queer"; in other words, homosexual people, bisexual people, transgender people, intersex people, androgynous people, cross-dressers, questioning people and others.

== General ==
- Debussy, Dorian Rhea (2026). The Lavender Bans: A Century of Anti-LGBTQ+ Policies in the US Military. Columbia University Press. ISBN 978-0231205757.
- Herbert, Melissa S. (2000). Camouflage Isn't Only for Combat: Gender, Sexuality, and Women in the Military. NYU Press. ISBN 978-0814735480.
- Polchar, Joshua; Sweijs, Tim; Marten, Philipp; Galdiga, Jan (2014). LGBT Military Personnel: A Strategic Vision for Inclusion. The Hague Centre for Strategic Studies. ISBN 978-9491040931.
- Shrader, Angela; Casero, Kellie; Casper, Bethany; Kelley, Mary; Lewis, Laura; Calohan, Jess. Military Lesbian, Gay, Bisexual, and Transgender (LGBT) Awareness Training for Health Care Providers Within the Military Health System. Sage Publications.

== Sexuality ==
- Bateman, Geoffrey; Belkin, Aaron (2003). Don't Ask, Don't Tell: Debating the Gay Ban in the Military. Lynne Rienner Publishers. ISBN 978-1588261465.
- Bérubé, Allan (2010). Coming Out Under Fire: The History of Gay Men and Women in World War II (20th Anniversary ed.). The University of North Carolina Press. ISBN 978-0807871775.
- Burrelli, David F. (2010). Homosexuals and the U. S. Military: Current Issues. CRS report for Congress. Diane Publishing. ISBN 978-1437923292.
- Burrelli, David F.; Library of Congress. Congressional Research Service (2011). "Don't Ask, Don't Tell": The Law and Military Policy on Same-Sex Behavior. CRS report for Congress. Diane Publishing. ISBN 978-1437922639.
- Canaday, Margot (2011). The Straight State: Sexuality and Citizenship in Twentieth-Century America. Princeton University Press. ISBN 978-0691149936.
- Carney, Ralph M.; Jobe, Jared B.; Herek, Gregory M. (1996). Out in Force: Sexual Orientation and the Military. Worlds of Desire: The Chicago Series on Sexuality, Gender, and Culture. University of Chicago Press. ISBN 978-0226400488.
- Estes, Steve (2009). Ask and Tell: Gay and Lesbian Veterans Speak Out (2nd ed.). Univ of North Carolina Press. ISBN 978-0807889855.
- Gershick, Zsa Zsa (2005). Secret Service: Untold Stories of Lesbians in the Military. Alyson Books. ISBN 978-1555837488.
- Halley, Janet E. (1999). Don't: A Reader's Guide to the Military's Anti-gay Policy. Duke University Press. ISBN 978-0822323174.
- Loftin, Craig M. (2012). Masked Voices: Gay Men and Lesbians in Cold War America. Suny Series in Queer Politics and Cultures. SUNY Press. ISBN 978-1438440163.
- Loverde, Anthony (2010). A Silent Force: Men and Women Serving Under Don't Ask, Don't Tell. AuthorHouse. ISBN 978-1452074351.
- McGowan, Jeffrey (2007). Major Conflict: One Gay Man's Life in the Don't-Ask-Don't-Tell Military. Crown/Archetype. ISBN 978-0307419118.
- Merritt, Rich (2017). Secrets of a Gay Marine Porn Star. Kensington. ISBN 978-0806538358.
- Pyle, Bryan; Wise, Joseph E.; Ritchie, Elspeth Cameron (2017). Gay Mental Healthcare Providers and Patients in the Military: Personal Experiences and Clinical Care. Springer. ISBN 978-3319660264.
- Rimmerman, Craig A. (1996). Gay Rights, Military Wrongs: Political Perspectives on Lesbians and Gays in the Military. Routledge. ISBN 978-1135638337.
- Shawver, Lois (1995). And the Flag was Still There: Straight People, Gay People, and Sexuality in the U.S. Military. Haworth gay & lesbian studies (2nd ed.). Psychology Press. ISBN 978-1560249092.
- Shilts, Randy (2005). Conduct Unbecoming: Gays and Lesbians in the U.S. Military (New ed.). St. Martin's Press. ISBN 978-0312342647.
- Schultz, Tammy S.; Huffman, J Ford (2012). The End of Don't Ask, Don't Tell: The Impact in Studies and Personal Essays by Service Members and Veterans. Government Printing Office. ISBN 978-0160915581.
- Scott, Wilbur J.; Stanley, Sandra Carson (1994). Gays and Lesbians in the Military: Issues, Concerns, and Contrasts. Social Problems and Social Issues. Transaction Publishers. ISBN 978-0202366227.
- Seba, Jaime A. (2014). Gay Issues and Politics: Marriage, the Military, & Work Place Discrimination. Simon and Schuster. ISBN 978-1422296745.
- Seefried, Josh (2011). Our Time: Breaking the Silence of "Don't Ask, Don't Tell". Penguin. ISBN 978-1101563052.
- Wharton, James (2013). Out in the Army: My Life as a Gay Soldier. Biteback Publishing. ISBN 978-1849546188.
- Wolinsky, Marc; Sherrill, Kenneth (1993). Gays and the Military: Joseph Steffan versus the United States. Princeton University Press. ISBN 978-1400821044.
- Zeeland, Steven (2014). Barrack Buddies and Soldier Lovers: Dialogues With Gay Young Men in the U.S. Military. Haworth Gay and Lesbian Studies. Routledge. ISBN 978-1317765028.
- Zeeland, Steven (2013). Sailors and Sexual Identity: Crossing the Line Between "Straight" and "Gay" in the U.S. Navy. Routledge. ISBN 978-1136589775.
- Homosexuals in the Military: Policies and Practices of Foreign Countries. Diane Publishing. 1993. ISBN 978-0788115554.
- Unfriendly Fire: How the Gay Ban Undermines the Military and Weakens America. 2009.
- Witt, Margaret (2017). Tell: Love, Defiance, and the Military Trial at the Tipping Point for Gay Rights. Brandeis University Press. ISBN 978-1611688429.
- Snyder-Hill, Stephen (2014). Soldier of Change: From the Closet to the Forefront of the Gay Rights Movement. Potomac Books. ISBN 978-1612346977.
- Parco, James E.; Levy, David A. (2013). Evolution of Government Policy Towards Homosexuality in the US Military: The Rise and Fall of DADT. Routledge. ISBN 978-0415816038.
- Nicholson, Alexander (2012). Fighting to Serve: Behind the Scenes in the War to Repeal "Don't Ask, Don't Tell". ISBN 978-1613743720.
- Seefried, Josh (2011). Our time : breaking the silence of "Don't ask, don't tell". ISBN 978-1594203312.
- Araiza, William D.; Woods, Daniel J. (2011). Understanding the Repeal of Don't Ask Don't Tell. Aspatore Books. ISBN 978-0314276537.
- Lemer, Bronson (2011). The last deployment : how a gay, hammer-swinging twentysomething survived a year in Iraq. University of Wisconsin Press. ISBN 978-0299282141.
- Lehring, Gary (2003). Officially gay : the political construction of sexuality by the U.S. military. Temple University Press. ISBN 1592130348.

== Transgender ==
- Beck, Kristen; Speckhard, Anne (2013). Warrior Princess: A U.S. Navy Seal's Journey to Coming Out Transgender. Advances Press. ISBN 978-1935866435.
- Borja, Terry (2018). Teaching Case: Transgender Sailors, Leadership Challenges, and Ethical Dilemmas. Kindle.
- Naval Postgraduate School (2015). Transgender in the U.S. Military: Policies, Problems, and Prospects. CreateSpace Independent Publishing Platform. ISBN 978-1505320879.
- United States Department of Defense (2016). Transgender Service in the U.S. Military: An Implementation Handbook. CreateSpace Independent Publishing Platform. ISBN 978-1539570639.
- United States Department of Defense (2019). Department of Defense Report and Recommendations On Military Service by Transgender Persons. Kindle.

== Intersex ==
- Gordon, Joan; Gordon, Mel (2017). Pulaski: The Forgotten Hero of Two Worlds. BookBaby. ISBN 978-1543921335.

== Cross-dressing ==
- Blanton, DeAnne; Cook Wike, Lauren (2003). They Fought Like Demons: Women Soldiers in the American Civil War (2nd ed.). Vintage. ISBN 978-1400033157.
- Cohen, Daniel A. (1998). "The Female Marine" and Related Works: Narratives of Cross-Dressing and Urban Vice in America's Early Republic. University of Massachusetts Press. ISBN 978-1558491243.
- Cohen, Daniel A (1994). The 'Female marine' in an era of good feelings: Cross dressing and the 'genius' of Nathaniel Coverly, Jr. American Antiquarian Society. ISBN 978-0944026519.
- Cook Burgess, Lauren; Wakeman, Sarah (1996). An Uncommon Soldier: The Civil War Letters of Sarah Rosetta Wakeman, alias Pvt. Lyons Wakeman, 153rd Regiment, New York State Volunteers, 1862-1864. Oxford University Press. ISBN 978-0195102437.
- Cooper, Hilary Roxanne Godette (2006). Cross-dressing Confederates and Unsexed Unionists: Women Soldiers in Disguise as Men in the American Civil War. University of North Carolina.
- Cordell, M. R. (2016). Courageous Women of the Civil War: Soldiers, Spies, Medics, and More. Women of Action. Chicago Review Press. ISBN 978-1613732007.
- Eggleston, Larry G. (2003). Women in the Civil War: Extraordinary Stories of Soldiers, Spies, Nurses, Doctors, Crusaders, and Others. McFarland. ISBN 978-0786414932.
- Enss, Chris; Chartier, JoAnn (2016). Soldier, Sister, Spy, Scout: Women Soldiers and Patriots on the Western Frontier. Two Dot Books. ISBN 978-1493023394.
- Ford, Carin T. (March 1, 2013). Women of the Civil War Through Primary Sources. Enslow Pub Inc. ISBN 978-0766041288.
- Gansler, Laura (2007). The Mysterious Private Thompson: The Double Life of Sarah Emma Edmonds, Civil War Soldier. Bison Books. ISBN 978-0803259881.
- Hall, Richard (1993). Patriots in Disguise: Women Warriors of the Civil War. Paragon House. ISBN 978-1557784384.
- Hall, Richard (2006). Women on the Civil War Battlefront. University Press of Kansas. ISBN 978-0700614370.
- Harriel, Shelby (2019). Behind the Rifle: Women Soldiers in Civil War Mississippi. University Press of Mississippi. ISBN 978-1496822017.
- Kneib, Martha (2004). Women Soldiers, Spies, and Patriots of the American Revolution. American Women at War. Rosen Pub Group. ISBN 978-0823944545.
- Leonard, Elizabeth D. (1999). All the Daring of the Soldier: Women of the Civil War Armies. W. W. Norton & Company. ISBN 978-0393335477.
- McPherson, Marcus (2015). Women Soldiers in the Civil War: 26 True Stories of Female Soldiers Who Fought in the Bloodiest American War. Amazon Digital Services LLC.
- Middleton, Lee (1993). Hearts of Fire – Soldier Women of the Civil War: With an Addendum on Female Reenactors. Vol. 1. University of Wisconsin – Madison. ISBN 978-1882755004.
- Monson, Marianne (2018). Women of the Blue and Gray: True Stories of Mothers, Medics, Soldiers, and Spies of the Civil War. Shadow Mountain. ISBN 978-1629724157.
- Reit, Seymour (2001). Behind Rebel Lines: The Incredible Story of Emma Edmonds, Civil War Spy. Great Episodes. HMH Books for Young Readers. ISBN 978-0152164270.
- Sears, Clare (2005). "A Dress Not Belonging to His Or Her Sex": Cross-dressing Law in San Francisco, 1860-1900. University of California.
- Silvey, Anita (2008). I'll Pass For Your Comrade: Women Soldiers in the Civil War. Clarion Books. ISBN 978-0618574919.
- Tsui, Bonnie (2006). She Went to the Field: Women Soldiers of the Civil War. TwoDot. ISBN 978-0762743841.
- Velazquez, Loreta (2003). The Woman in Battle: The Civil War Narrative of Loreta Janeta Velazques, Cuban Woman and Confederate Soldier. Wisconsin Studies in Autobiography. University of Wisconsin Press. ISBN 978-0299194246.
- Young, Alfred F. (2004). Masquerade: The Life and Times of Deborah Sampson, Continental Soldier. Knopf. ISBN 978-0679441656.
- Female Wartime Crossdressers in the American Civil War. General Books LLC. 2012. ISBN 978-1234663421.

== Androgyny ==
- Browdy, Jennifer (2018). Women in Combat: Honoring the Androgynous in Human Nature. Transition Times.
- Dyvik, Synne L. (2016). Gendering Counterinsurgency: Performativity, Embodiment and Experience in the Afghan 'Theatre of War'. Routledge. ISBN 978-1317438397.
- Hecker, William (2003). The Androgynous Warrior: An Examination of Gender Blending in Twain's Military Heroes. Penn State University Press.
- Huffman, Ann H. (2014). Gender Roles in a Masculine Occupation: Military Men and Women's Differential Negotiation of the Work–Family Interface. Springer.
- Morgan, Erin (2007). Masculinity and Femininity in the Corps. JSTOR.
- Van Gilder, Bobbi J. (2018). Femininity as Perceived Threat to Military Effectiveness: How Military Service Members Reinforce Hegemonic Masculinity in Talk. Western Journal of Communication.
- Waller, Phoebe (2016). A Brief History Of Women In Menswear Proves Androgyny Isn't Just A New Trend. Bustle.

== See also ==
- Bibliography of works on wartime cross-dressing
- Outline of LGBT topics
- Don't ask, don't tell
- Bibliography of United States military history
