= Yoshiko Kawashima =

Qing dynasty royal and Japanese spy (1907–1948)

- 川島 芳子
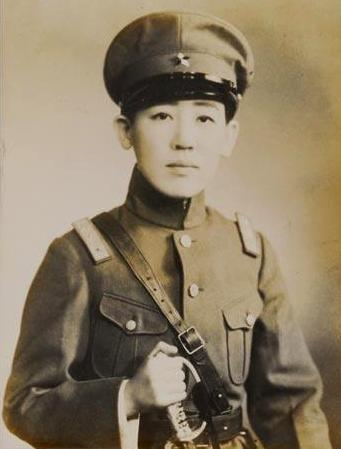
- Yoshiko Kawashima in Manchukuo army uniform
- Born: Xianzi (顯㺭); 24 May 1907; Beijing, Qing Empire
- Died: 25 March 1948 (aged 40); Beijing, Republic of China
- Burial place: Shōrinji, Matsumoto, Nagano Prefecture, Japan
- Other names: Dongzhen (東珍); Jin Bihui (金璧輝); Eastern Jewel; Xianyu (顯玗)
- Spouse: Ganjuurjab (m. 1927; div. 1930)
- Relatives: Shanqi (father); Lady Zhanggiya (mother); Kawashima Naniwa (adoptive father)
- Military career
- Allegiance: Manchukuo; Empire of Japan
- Branch: Kwantung Army
- Nickname: Joan of Arc of Manchukuo
- Conflicts: Pacification of Manchukuo
- Other work: Spy

Aisin Gioro Xianzi
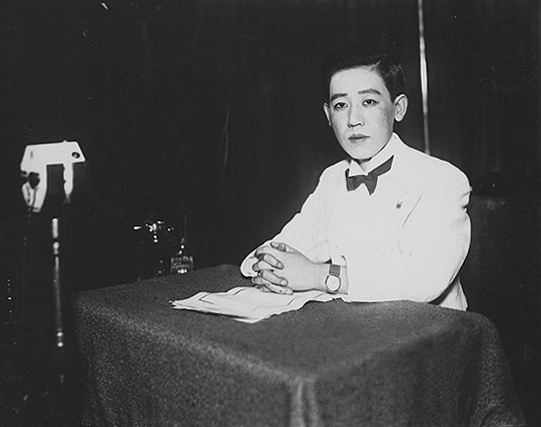
- Kawashima in a recording studio, 1933

Chinese name
- Traditional Chinese: 金璧輝
- Simplified Chinese: 金璧辉
Transcriptions
Standard Mandarin
- Hanyu Pinyin: Jīn Bìhuī
- Wade–Giles: Chin^{1} Pi^{4}-hui^{1}

Birth name
- Traditional Chinese: 愛新覺羅·顯㺭
- Simplified Chinese: 爱新觉罗·显㺭
Transcriptions
Standard Mandarin
- Hanyu Pinyin: Àixīnjuéluó Xiǎnzǐ
- Wade–Giles: Ai^{4}-hsin^{1}-chüeh^{2}-lo^{2} Hsien^{3}-tzu^{3}

Courtesy name
- Traditional Chinese: 東珍
- Simplified Chinese: 东珍
- Literal meaning: Eastern Jewel
Transcriptions
Standard Mandarin
- Hanyu Pinyin: Dōngzhēn
- Wade–Giles: Tung^{1}-chen^{1}

Japanese name
- Kanji: 川島芳子
- Hiragana: かわしま よしこ
- Katakana: カワシマ ヨシコ
Transcriptions
- Romanization: Kawashima Yoshiko

Yoshiko Kawashima (川島 芳子, Kawashima Yoshiko; 24 May 1907 – 25 March 1948), born Aisin Gioro Xianyu (愛新覺羅 · 顯㺭), was a Qing dynasty royal, part of the Aisin Gioro clan. Kawashima was raised in Japan and served as a spy for the Japanese Kwantung Army and Manchukuo during the Second Sino-Japanese War, and is sometimes known in fiction under the pseudonym "Eastern Mata Hari". After the war, Kawashima was captured, sentenced, and executed as a traitor by the Nationalist government of the Republic of China. Kawashima is also a notable descendant of Hooge, eldest son of Hong Taiji.

== Names ==
Born to the Aisin Gioro clan, the imperial clan of the Manchu-led Qing dynasty, Kawashima had the birth name Aisin Gioro Xianzi (alternatively, later autographs indicate the personal name Xianyu) and the courtesy name Dongzhen (literally "eastern jewel"). Kawashima's Sinicised name was Jin Bihui. Kawashima is best known under their Japanese name, Kawashima Yoshiko (川島 芳子), which is read as Chuāndǎo Fāngzǐ in Chinese. After 1925, Kawashima occasionally used the male name Ryōsuke.

== Family background and early life ==
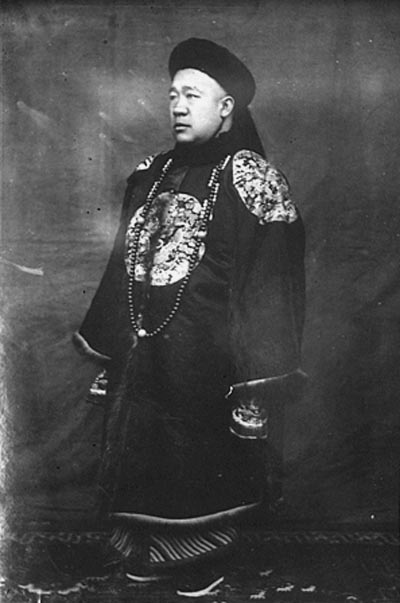
Shanqi (1866–1922), Kawashima's biological father

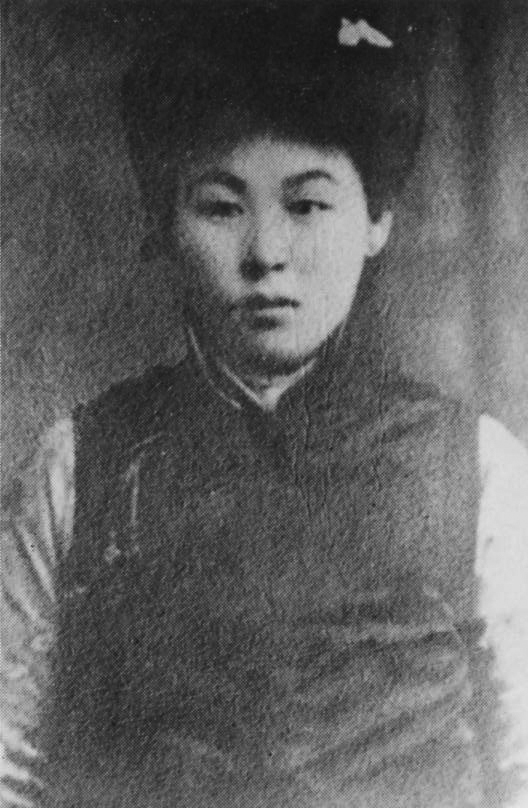
Kawashima's mother Lady Janggiya, the 4th consort of Prince Suzhong

Kawashima was born Aisin Gioro Xianzi in Beijing in 1907 as the 35th child of Shanqi (1866–1922), a Manchu royal of the Aisin Gioro clan, the imperial clan of China's Qing dynasty. Lady Janggiya (張佳氏), Shanqi's fourth concubine, was Xianzi's mother. Shanqi was a descendant of Hooge, the eldest son of Hong Taiji (the second ruler of the Qing dynasty). Shanqi was also the tenth heir to the Prince Su peerage, one of the 12 "iron-cap" princely peerages of the Qing dynasty.

After the Xinhai Revolution overthrew the Qing dynasty in 1912, Xianzi was given up for adoption in 1915 at the age of eight to Shanqi's friend, Kawashima Naniwa, a Japanese espionage agent and mercenary adventurer. Xianzi's adoptive father changed their name to "Yoshiko Kawashima" and took Kawashima back to Tokyo, Japan, to be raised and educated in the Kawashima family house. As a teenager, Kawashima was sent to school in Tokyo for an education that included judo and fencing.

In 1922, around the time that Kawashima's adoptive family moved to Matsumoto, Kawashima's biological father, Shanqi, died. As Kawashima's mother had no official identity as Shanqi's concubine, she followed Manchu tradition and died by suicide to join Shanqi in death.

=== Gender identity ===
On 22 November 1925, Kawashima claimed to have "...decided to cease being a woman forever." Earlier that day, Kawashima had dressed in a kimono with a traditional female hair style and took a photo among blooming cosmos to commemorate "my farewell to life as a woman." That evening, Kawashima went to a barbershop and got a crew cut, from then on dressing in men's clothes. A photo of the transformation appeared five days later in the Asahi Shimbun under the headline: "Kawashima Yoshiko's Beautiful Black Hair Completely Cut Off - Because of Unfounded 'Rumors,' Makes Firm Decision to Become a Man - Touching Secret Tale of [Kawashima] Shooting [Themself]", alluding to a prior episode in which Kawashima attempted suicide with a pistol given by Iwata Ainosuke.

Several explanations have later been given as to what triggered Kawashima's decision, including the death of Kawashima's parents, failed romances or alleged sexual abuse from Kawashima's foster father.

Kawashima explained in another article two days after the first that "I was born with what the doctors call a tendency toward the third sex, and so I cannot pursue an ordinary woman's goals in life... Since I was young I've been dying to do the things that boys do. My impossible dream is to work hard like a man for China, for Asia."

Earlier in their life, it had been remarked upon that Kawashima had "boyish habits" despite their feminine beauty. Kawashima would use only the male style of Japanese grammar, even though that contributed to Kawashima not being re-admitted to their school after the death of Kawashima's biological father.

== Espionage career ==
In November 1927 at age 20, Kawashima's brother and adoptive father arranged for their marriage in Port Arthur (also known as Ryojun) to Ganjuurjab, the son of Inner Mongolian Army general Babojab, who once led the Mongolian-Manchurian Independence Movement there in 1911. The marriage ended in divorce after only three years. Kawashima moved to the foreign concession in Shanghai. While in Shanghai, Kawashima met Japanese military attaché and intelligence officer Ryukichi Tanaka, who utilised Kawashima's contacts with the Manchu and Mongol nobility to expand Kawashima's network. Kawashima was living with Tanaka in Shanghai at the time of the Shanghai Incident of 1932.

After Tanaka was recalled to Japan, Kawashima continued to serve as a spy for the general Kenji Doihara. Kawashima undertook undercover missions in Manchuria, often in disguise, and was considered "strikingly attractive, with a dominating personality, almost a film-drama figure, half tom-boy and half heroine, and with a passion for dressing up as a male. [They] possibly did this in order to impress the men, or [they] may have done it in order to more easily fit into the tightly-knit guerrilla groups without attracting too much attention".

Kawashima was well-acquainted with Puyi, the last emperor of the Qing dynasty, who regarded Kawashima as a member of the imperial family and welcomed Kawashima into his household during Kawashima's stay in Tianjin. It was through this close liaison that Kawashima was able to persuade Puyi to become a figurehead ruler for Manchukuo, a puppet state created by the Japanese in Manchuria. However, Kawashima privately criticised Puyi for being too amenable to Japanese influence.

After Puyi became Emperor of Manchukuo, Kawashima continued to play various roles and, for a time, was a lover of Hayao Tada, the chief military advisor to Puyi. Kawashima formed an independent counterinsurgency cavalry force in 1932 made up of 3,000-5,000 former bandits to hunt down anti-Japanese guerrilla bands during the Pacification of Manchukuo, and was hailed in the Japanese newspapers as the Joan of Arc of Manchukuo. In 1933, Kawashima was offered the unit to the Japanese Kwantung Army for Operation Nekka, but it was refused. The unit continued to exist under Kawashima's command until sometime in the late 1930s.

Kawashima became a well-known and popular figure in Manchukuo, making appearances on radio broadcasts and even issuing a record of their songs. Numerous fictional and semi-fictional stories of Kawashima's exploits were published in newspapers and also as pulp fiction. However, Kawashima's very popularity created issues with the Kwantung Army because Kawashima's utility as an intelligence asset was long gone, and Kawashima's value as a propaganda symbol was compromised by their increasingly critical tone against the Japanese military's exploitative policies in Manchukuo as a base of operations against China in the Second Sino-Japanese War, and Kawashima gradually faded from public sight.

== Capture, trial and execution ==
After the end of the war, on 11 November 1945, a news agency reported that "a long sought-for beauty in male costume was arrested in Beijing by counter-intelligence officers". Kawashima was held at Hebei Model Prison.

The Supreme Court of Hebei originally addressed Kawashima as "Chuandao Fangzi" (the Chinese pronunciation of their Japanese name's kanji). When Kawashima's trial began a month later, Kawashima identified themself by their Chinese name, "Jin Bihui", which eventually became the name court officials used. However, in accordance with Kawashima's lawyers' strategy to deflect Kawashima's charge of treason, Kawashima gradually began to emphasise a Japanese or Manchu banner identity. The court rejected the defence's bid to have Kawashima tried as a war criminal rather than as a domestic traitor, based on a combination of jus sanguinis and Kawashima's failure to formally renounce their citizenship through China's Department of Civil Affairs.

Charged with treason as a hanjian on 20 October 1947, Kawashima was executed by a bullet shot into the back of their head on 25 March 1948, and their body was later put on public display.

Kawashima's body was collected by a Japanese monk to be cremated. Kawashima's remains were sent back to their adoptive family and later buried at Shōrinji temple in Matsumoto, Nagano Prefecture, Japan.

== Gallery ==
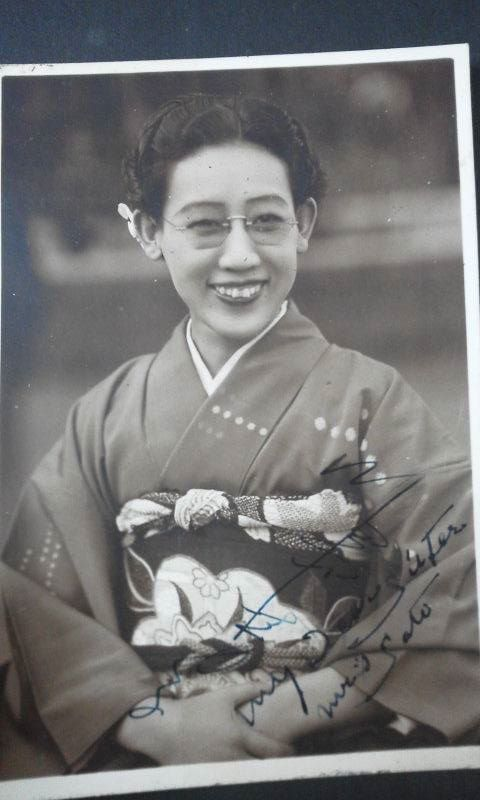
Kawashima in Kimono with a signature to their friends

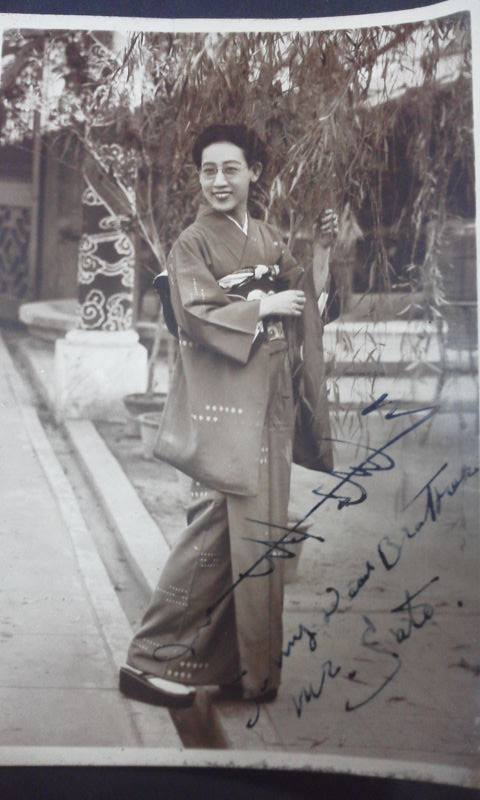
Kawashima in Kimono with a signature to their friends

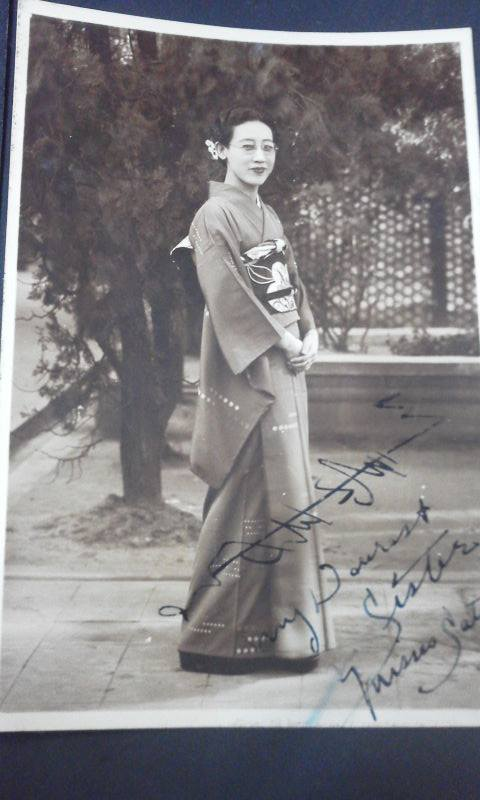
Kawashima in Kimono with a signature to their friends

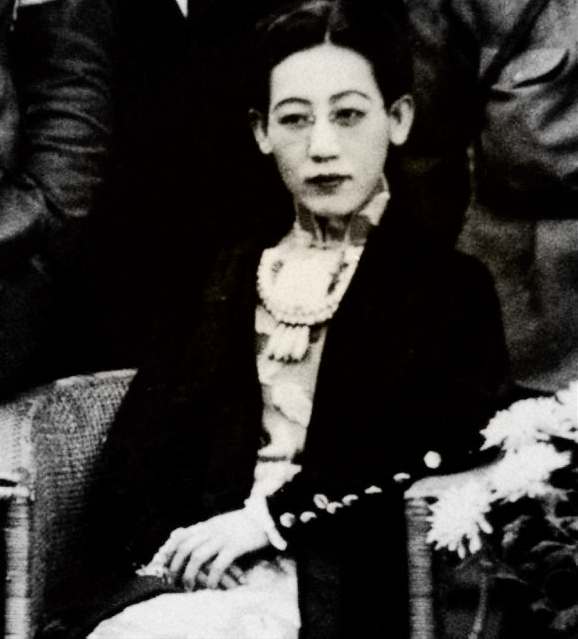

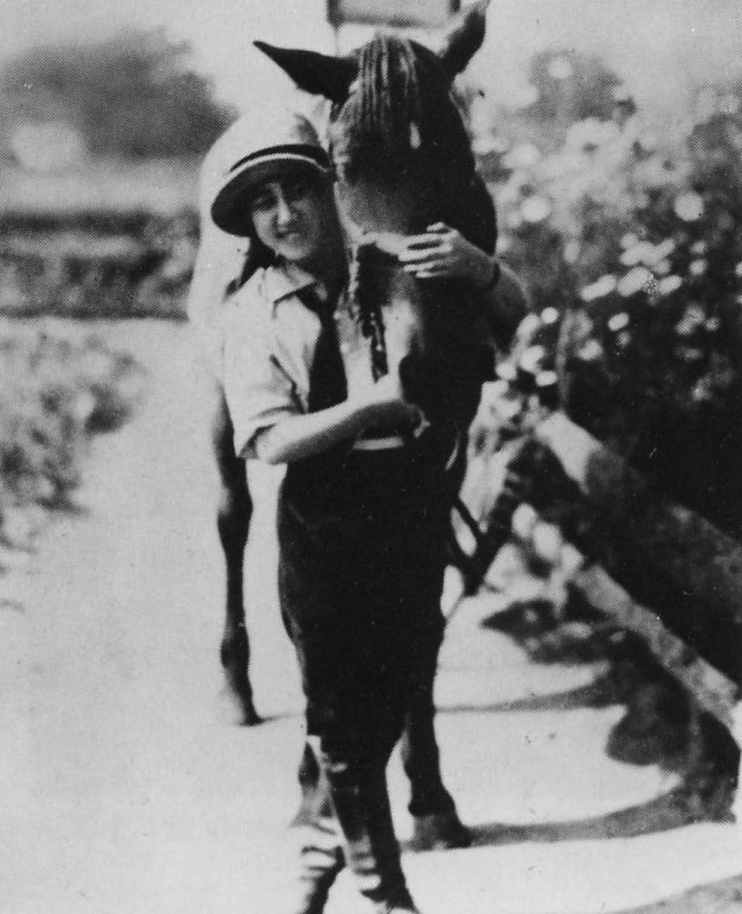
During Kawashima's high school days

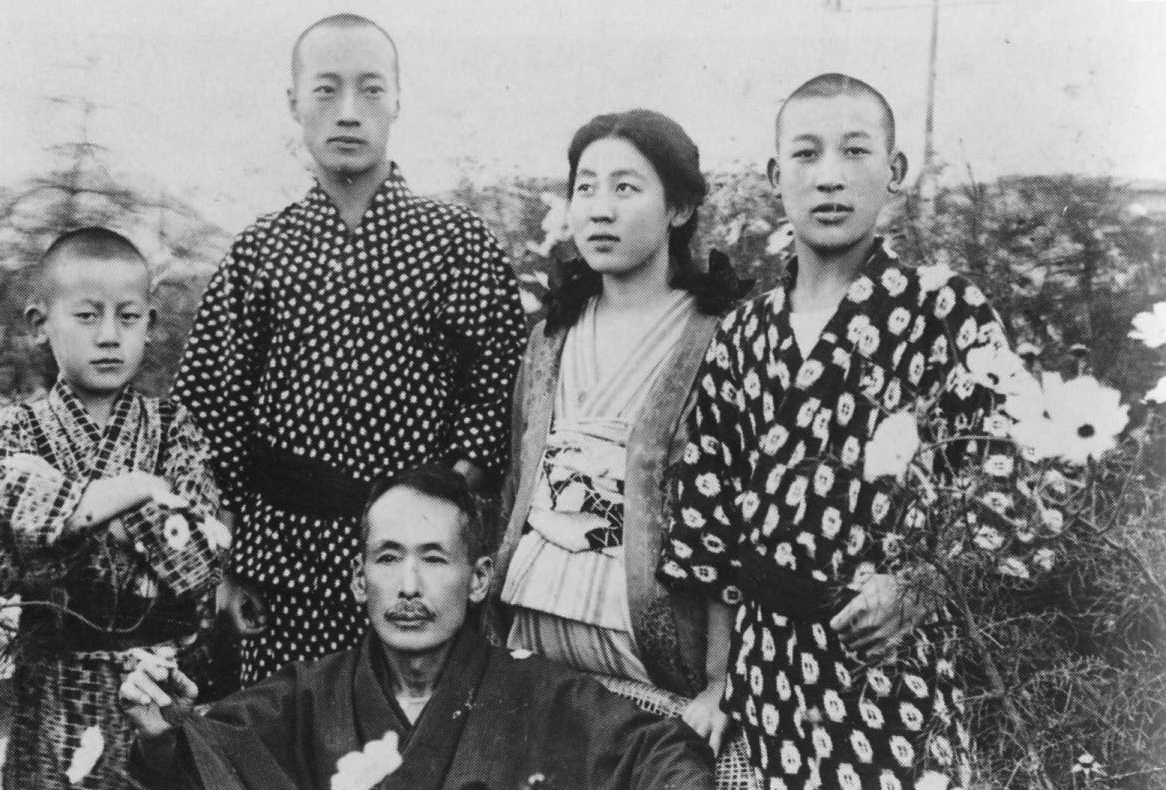
Yoshiko Kawashima and brothers and foster-father Kawashima Naniwa

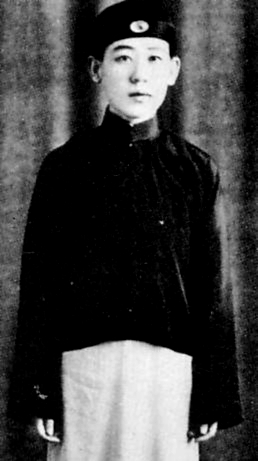
Yoshiko Kawashima

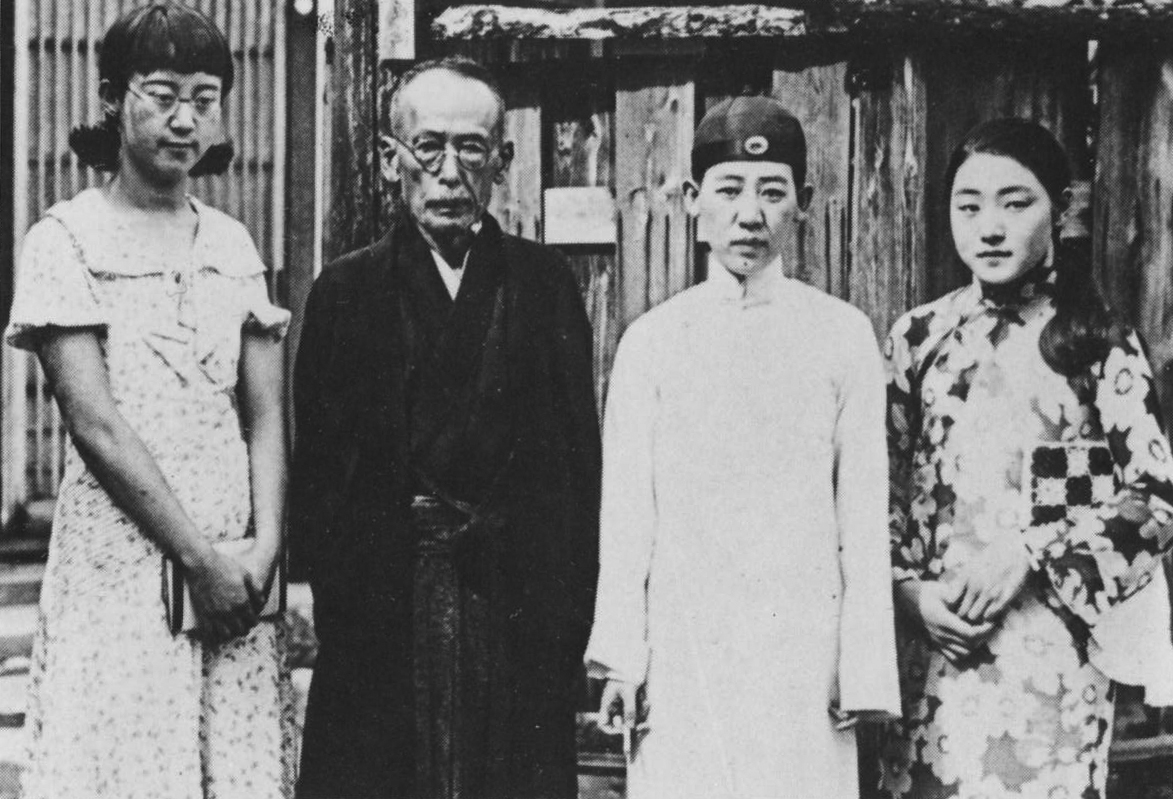
Renko Kawashima, Kawashima Naniwa, Yoshiko Kawashima, and Chizuko (Yoshiko's secretary) in Matsumoto.

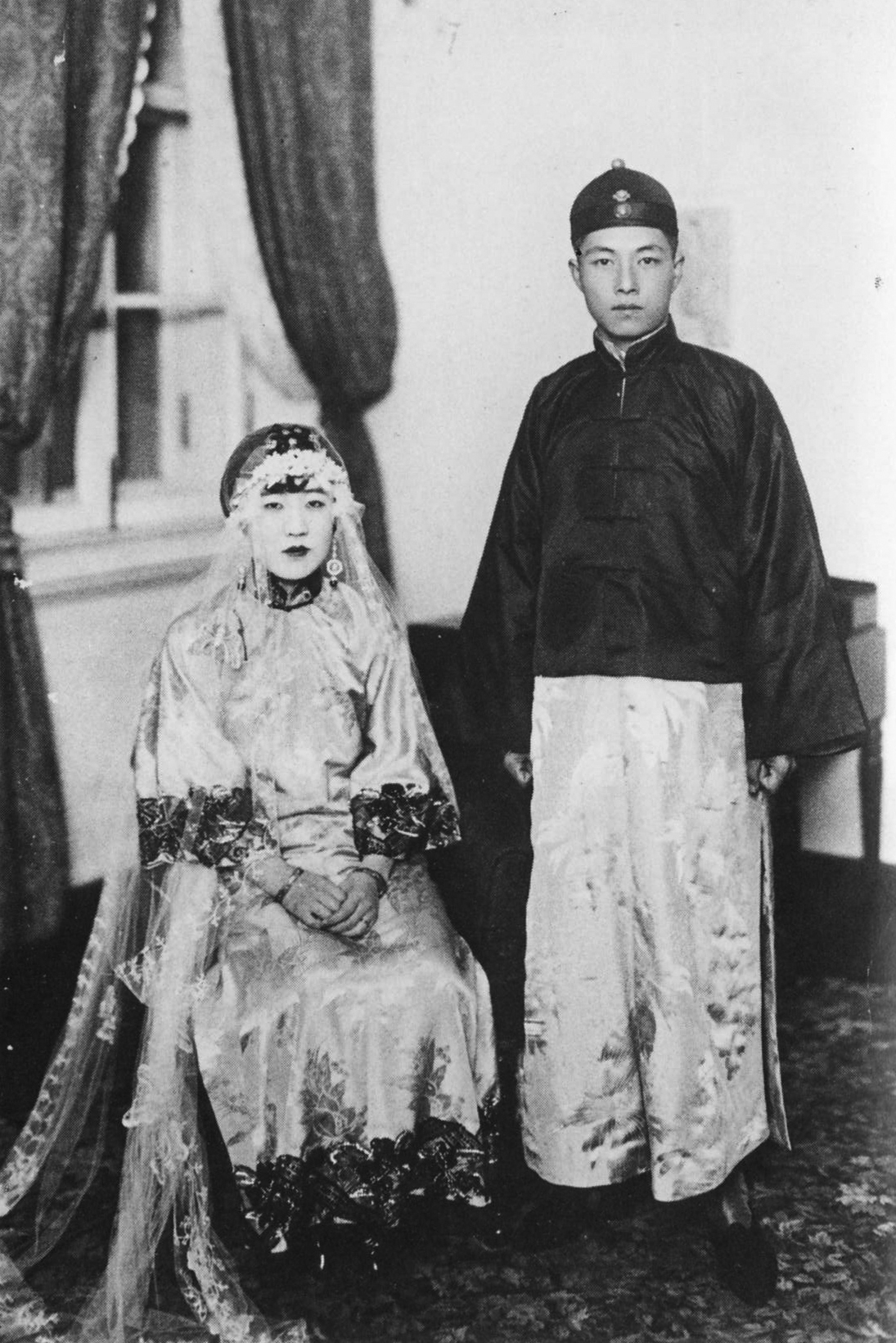
Yoshiko Kawashima's marriage with Ganjuurjab in 1927

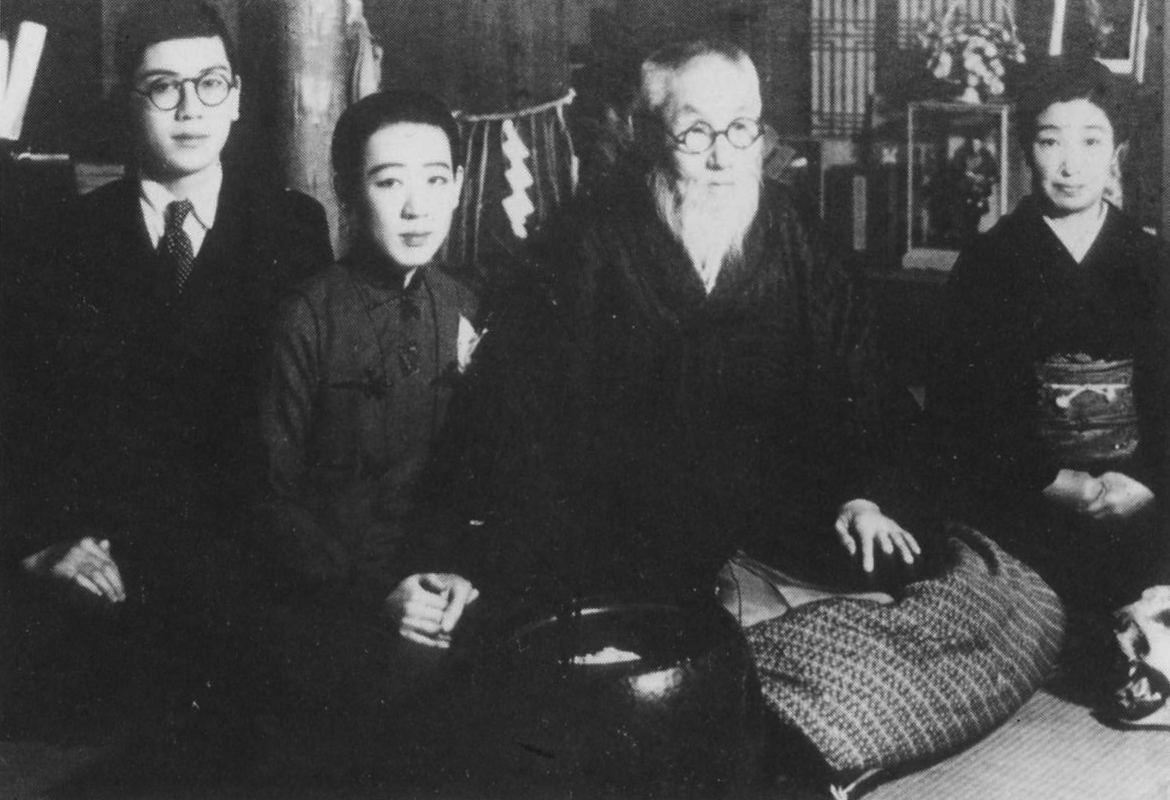
Kawashima Yoshiko visiting the home of Tōyama Mitsuru.

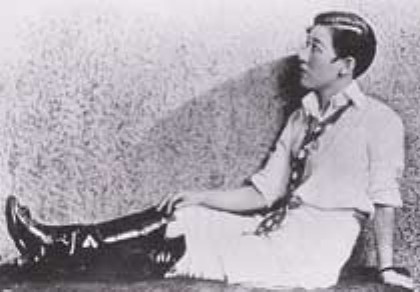

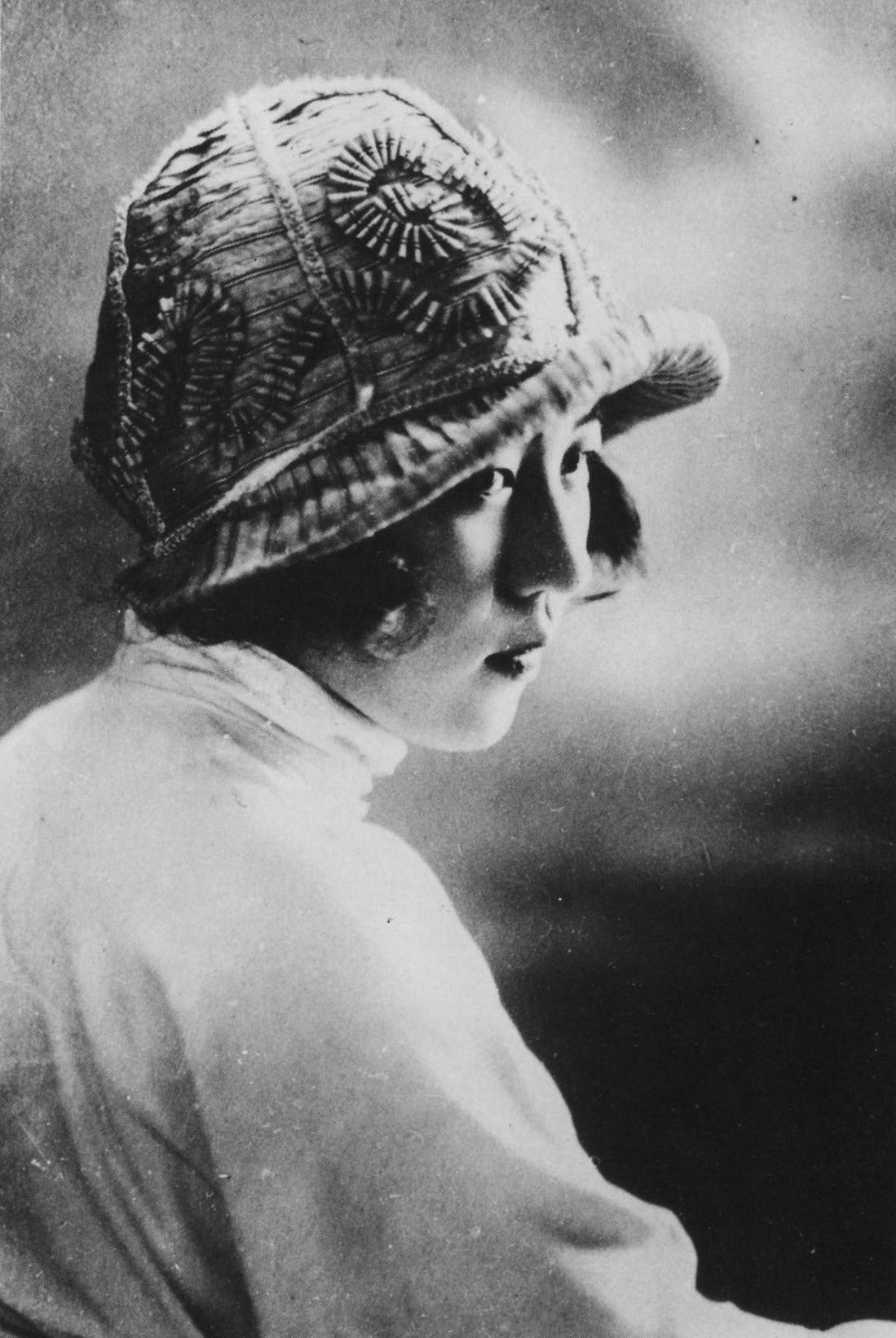
Kawashima Yoshiko adolescent

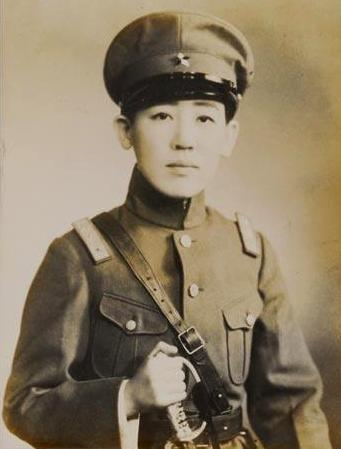
Kawashima in Manchurian military uniform

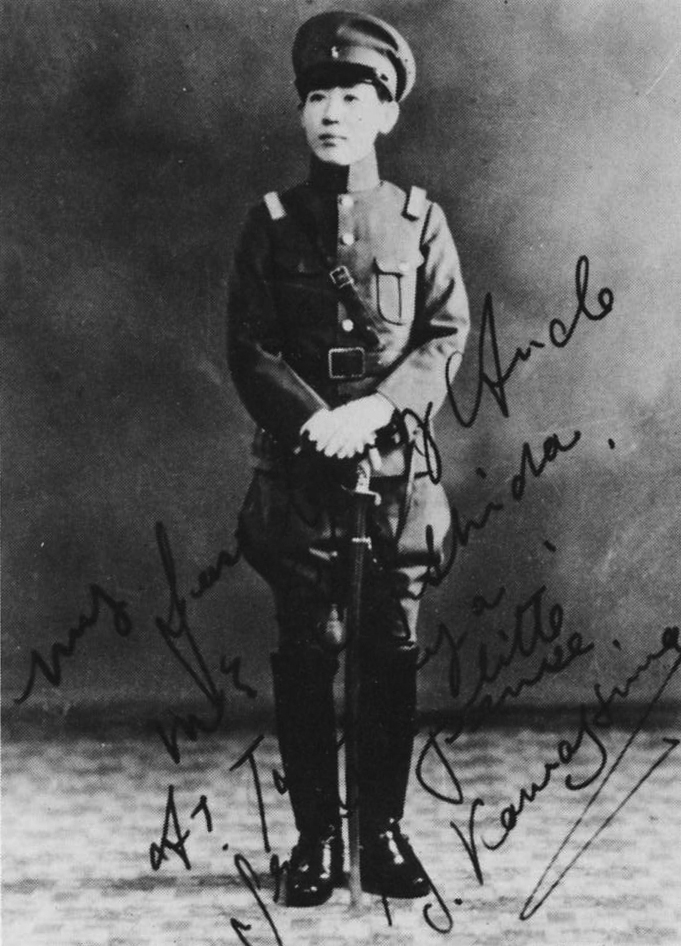
Autographed Photo of Kawashima Yoshiko

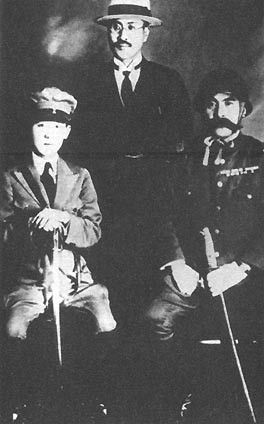
Kawashima (left) with Kawashima Naniwa (centre) and Ryukichi Tanaka (right), 1933

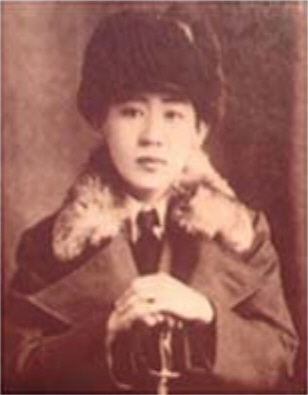
Kawashima Yoshiko

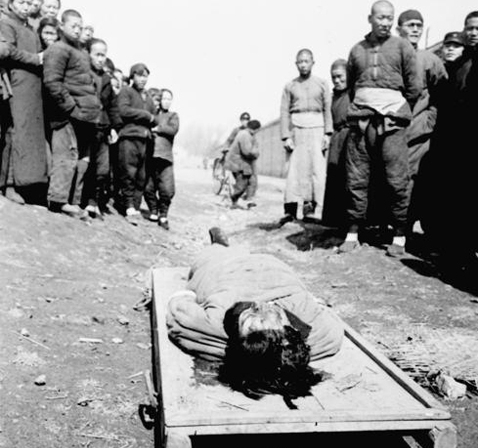
Photo of executed Yoshiko Kawashima in 1948

== In popular culture ==
- In the Chinese language, Kawashima's name (both Chuandao Fangzi and Jin Bihui) are synonymous with the idea of a "female spy" or a hanjian.

=== Films ===
- In Bernardo Bertolucci's 1987 film The Last Emperor, Kawashima appeared as "Eastern Jewel", played by Maggie Han.
- Miyuki Takakura portrayed Kawashima in the 1957 Japanese film Sen'un Ajia no Joō.
- Anita Mui portrayed Kawashima in the 1990 Hong Kong film Kawashima Yoshiko.
- Wong Wan-sze portrayed Kawashima in 1991 Hong Kong film God of Gamblers III: Back to Shanghai.
- Kawashima was portrayed by Rei Kikukawa in the 2007 Japanese drama Ri Kouran, which tells the story of the life of Yoshiko Yamaguchi.
- Meisa Kuroki portrayed Kawashima in the 2008 Japanese drama Dansō no Reijin: Kawashima Yoshiko no Shōgai.

=== Books ===
Two books titled The Beauty in Men's Clothing have been published about Yoshiko, the first a partly-fictionalized novel by Muramatsu Shōfū published in 1933, the second by Shōfū's grandson Tomomi in 2002 about the composition of the former.

== Bibliography ==
- Birnbaum, Phyllis (14 April 2015). Manchu Princess, Japanese Spy: The Story of Kawashima Yoshiko, the Cross-Dressing Spy Who Commanded Her Own Army. Asia Perspectives: History, Society, and Culture. Columbia University Press. ISBN 9780231152181.
- Crowdy, Terry, The Enemy Within (Oxford: Osprey, 2006), Chapter 10
- Deacon, Richard (1986). A History of the Japanese Secret Service. Berkley Publishing Company. ISBN 0-425-07458-7.
- Jowett, Philip (2005). Rays of the Rising Sun, Volume 1: Japan's Asian Allies 1931-45, China and Manchukuo. Helion and Company Ltd. ISBN 1-874622-21-3.
- Kleeman, Faye Yuan (2014). In Transit: The Formation of a Colonial East Asian Cultural Sphere. University of Hawaii Press. ISBN 978-0-8248-3861-4.
- Grant DePauw, Linda (2000). Battle Cries and Lullabies: Women in War from Prehistory to the Present. University of Oklahoma Press. ISBN 0-8061-3288-4.
- Lee, Lillian (1992). The Last Princess of Manchuria. William Morrow & Co. ISBN 0-688-10834-2.
- Woods, Willa Lou (1937). Princess Jin, the Joan of Arc of the Orient. World Publishing Company. OCLC 942732.
- Yamamuro, Shinichi (2005). Manchuria Under Japanese Domination. University of Pennsylvania Press. ISBN 0-8122-3912-1.
- Lindley, Maureen (2008). The private papers of Eastern Jewel. London: Bloomsbury. ISBN 978-0-7475-9116-0.
