= Chizuko =

- Gender: Female

Origin
- Origin: Japanese
- Meaning: Different meanings depending on the kanji used

Chizuko (written: 千寿子, 千鶴子) is a feminine Japanese given name. Notable people with the name include:

- Chizuko Kimura (born 1970), Japanese sushi chef
- Chizuko Mifune (御船 千鶴子; 1886–1911), Japanese clairvoyant
- Chizuko Okamoto (岡本 千鶴子; born 1951), murderer of Rikako Okamoto
- Chizuko Judy Sugita de Queiroz, American artist and art educator
- Chizuko Takahashi (高橋 千鶴子; born 1959), Japanese politician
- Chizuko Tanaka (田中 千鶴子; born 1939 or 1940), Japanese athlete
- Chizuko Ueno (上野 千鶴子; born 1948), Japanese socialist
- Chizuko Yoshida (吉田 千鶴子; 1924–2017), Japanese artist

== Fictional characters ==
- Chizuko Katao, a character in Chizuko's Younger Sister
