= Babojab =

Mongol politician (1875–1916)

Kharchin Gün Babojab
- Шударга баатар Бавуужав
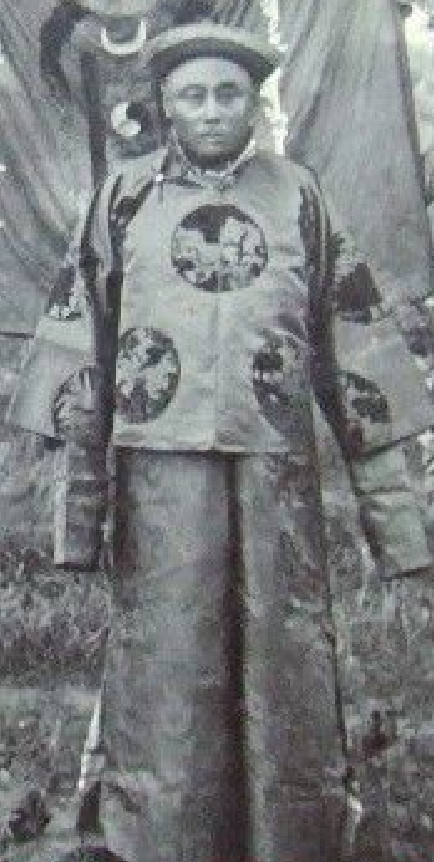
- Kharchin Gün Shudargabaatar Babojab
- Born: 1875; Tumed Left Wing Banner, Josutu League, Qing China (present-day Fuxin Mongol Autonomous County, Liaoning, China)
- Died: 1916 (aged 40–41); Linxi County, Rehe Province, China
- Military career
- Allegiance: Japan; Mongolia
- Branch: cavalry
- Service years: 1904—1905, 1912—1915
- Conflicts: Russo-Japanese War; Battle of the Five Routes

Shudargabaatar Babojab (Mongolian: Шударга баатар Бавуужав, 1875–1916) was an ethnic Mongol prince and military leader. The Japanese planned to overthrow Yuan Shikai's government by supporting Babojab in his effort to re-establish the Qing dynasty, which would rule the Mongolian Plateau, Manchuria, and North China. At the end of 1915, Babojab's army retreated to Hailar after attacks from Khatanbaatar Magsarjav near Dolon Nor and Hohhot His troops fought the soldiers of the Republic of China in Manchuria and Inner Mongolia during the Warlord Era. In July 1916 following the death of Yuan Shikai, he enlisted the help of Kawashima Naniwa and other Japanese nationals and raised an army. Three thousand Mongolian cavalrymen defeated Wu Junsheng's Fengtian Clique and occupied Guojiadian in Shandong, on the main line of the South Manchuria Railway. However, later that year Babojab was killed and his army defeated near Linxi, Inner Mongolia.

His son Ganjuurjab married Yoshiko Kawashima.
