= Murder of Rikako Okamoto =

2005 murder in Japan

In 2005 at Hiratsuka, Kanagawa Prefecture, Japan, Rikako Okamoto (岡本 利加香, Okamoto Rikako; 1986 – c. October 12, 2005) was murdered and her mother Chizuko Okamoto (岡本 千鶴子, Okamoto Chizuko) (born July 17, 1951) was later convicted of killing her own daughter. Chizuko Okamoto was also suspected as a serial killer who might have killed at least four others, but was not charged. Asahi Shimbun described her mysterious incident as the "house of horrors".

== Background ==
Chizuko Okamoto was born in Aomori Prefecture. She ran away from her first husband in 1975 and began a relationship with the man who would later become her common-law husband. Her first husband died in a tsunami on Okushiri Island in 1993.

Chizuko's six-year-old son, Toshihide, disappeared in 1984. She gave birth to two children in 1985 and 1987, but did not report their births. Her common-law husband died of illness in 1997. She began to insist that her disappeared son was abducted by agents of the North Korean government.

== Murder and arrest ==
At the time, Chizuko Okamoto lived with her 35-year-old stepson Minehiro Yamauchi and her 19-year-old daughter Rikako. Her daughter died in October 2005, and Yamauchi died in March 2006. Yamauchi's mother found the bodies of her son and Rikako in Okamoto's apartment in Hiratsuka, Kanagawa Prefecture on May 1, 2006. Upon investigation of the apartment, police discovered the remains of Toshihide and her two other newborns. The police also found a memo suggesting that Okamoto was the murderer, and, on May 3, 2006, she was arrested.

== Controversy and trial ==
The death of Minehiro Yamauchi was ruled a suicide. Autopsies performed on the bodies of the three children were inconclusive, and because the three-year statute of limitations on the crime of abandoning a corpse had passed, no charges relating to the children were pursued.

During the trial, Chizuko Okamoto insisted on her innocence and claimed that Minehiro had killed Rikako. Despite a lack of admissible physical evidence and witnesses, Okamoto was convicted. On July 23, 2007, the Yokohama District Court sentenced her to 12 years in prison for the murder of her daughter.

Chizuko Okamoto appealed the guilty verdict. Her appellate hearing commenced in the Tokyo High Court on May 8, 2008. The Tokyo High Court upheld her sentence on October 23, 2008.

== See also ==
- Statute of limitations
- Osaka child abandonment case
- List of serial killers by country
