= The History of Constantius and Pulchera =

The History of Constantius and Pulchera, or Constancy Rewarded is a romance novella that was popular in the United States during the first half of the 19th century. Serialized in a women's magazine over the years of 1789–1790, it was first printed in book form in 1794, and was reprinted many times

However, interpretation of the novella has proved difficult for modern scholars. The melodrama of the work is difficult to take seriously, and some insist that it was meant to be read as a parody.
