= The Female Marine =

Newspaper pamphlet

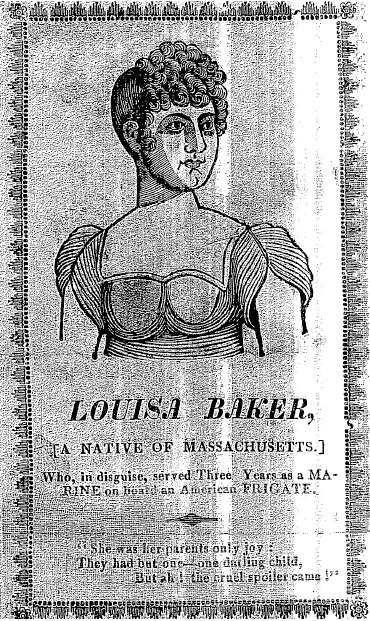
- Author: Lucy Brewer or Nathaniel Hill Wright
- Original title: The Female Marine; or the Adventures of Louisa Baker
- Language: English
- Publisher: Nathaniel Coverly
- Publication date: First publication, 1815
- Publication place: United States
- Media type: Newspaper pamphlet

The Female Marine, or The Adventures of Lucy Brewer, was first published in 1815 as a series of pamphlets sold in Boston. The series is the supposedly autobiographical account of Lucy Brewer, although controversy has surrounded the true authorship of the story as some believe it was in fact written by Nathaniel Hill Wright.

== Plot summary ==
First Part: The Narrative of Lucy Brewer Sixteen-year-old Louisa Lucy Brewer lives the life of a farm girl in Plymouth, Massachusetts. She falls in love with a boy named Henry and becomes pregnant soon after. Henry's refusal to marry Lucy leads her to the city of Boston, which was then perceived as a port city of bustling opportunity. Lucy travels to Boston looking for a chambermaid job with better wages. After her baby dies during childbirth, Lucy is duped into a life of prostitution and struggles in a cycle of seductions and betrayals. Lucy speaks of the people and incidents she has seen during her three years working in West Boston. In 1812, she meets a first lieutenant of a privateer, who mentions in a conversation with Lucy that if he were a woman, he would disguise himself as a man and “rove about and see the world” just like Revolutionary war veteran Miss Sampson who disguised herself as Robert Shurtliff (70). Reluctant to return home to her parents or stay in the brothel, Lucy escapes by joining the Marine Corps to patriotically fight in the War of 1812. Dressing as a man and taking the name George Baker, Lucy disguises herself to go aboard the frigate U.S.S. Constitution. For the three years that she serves and fights in naval battles against the British, Lucy keeps her gender a complete secret. Afterward, Lucy chooses to return to her parents’ home after leaving six years prior. She transitions back into her life at Plymouth as a woman, traditionally marrying and living the rest of her life. She marries a man named Charles West. Lucy confesses that her reason for writing this story and revealing her double life stems from her desire to dissuade young girls from listening to the “voice of love, unless sanctioned by paternal approbation, and to resist the impulse of inclination, when it runs counter to the precepts of religion and virtue” (76).

Second Part: Continuation of Narrative Lucy officially reveals her true identity at the beginning of Part Two, and briefly provides an overview of the events told in Part One. After resettling at her parents' farm, Lucy leaves again for Newport, Rhode Island, disguised as a man. On the carriage that she took to Newport, Lucy finds herself in an altercation; as a disguised man, Lucy notices two men who purposely speak condescendingly towards a woman in the inn that the carriage's passengers temporarily stop at. Lucy, as George Baker, threatens to duel the men in a gunfight. Three weeks after Lucy's arrival in the city, the woman from the inn invites Lucy for dinner due to her honorable actions on the carriage ride. Lucy learns that the woman belongs to a wealthy family in New York City. After leaving New York and arriving in Providence, Rhode Island, Lucy visits the brothel that had once tricked her. Inquiring about herself to the owner of the brothel, Lucy learns about the brothel owner's true thoughts; she at least expected Lucy to thank her for the 'services' and shelter she was given. This leads into Lucy's digression where she tells a story of a young man who was deceived by a prostitute and fell ill to disease, warning the reader to not engage in these areas of the city. Lucy ends this second part with a lengthy piece of advice, warning her young readers about the consequences of intercourse with prostitutes, and the loss of young potential that results from this. She warns for the innocent and the inexperienced to fight against their temptations.

Third Part: An Awful Beacon Lucy once again returns to her parents' farm where she wishes to live the remainder of her life as a woman in the countryside. This third part of her story is presented in a series of epistolary correspondences among Lucy, William, and Mr. Charles West. A son of a tradesman in the community by the name of William confesses his love for Lucy before he leaves the countryside for business. Soon after, Mr. Charles West contacts Lucy via letters and explains how he discovered her story through her publication of "The Adventures of Lucy Brewer." Lucy learns that Mr. West is the brother of the woman whose house she visited in New York City. Stuck with the task of choosing between two men, Lucy learns that William is killed in a boat accident on his way to Boston. After returning from Boston, Mr. West asks Benjamin Brewer (Lucy's father) for her hand in marriage; Lucy marries Mr. West. Ending her story with "A Farewell Address to the Youths of my Native State," Lucy once again warns against the vice and debauchery that youth will be most susceptible to. She accentuates her point with a story of a girl named Mariad whom she knew during her days at the brothel. Lucy hopes that her "moral reflections" will serve as a beacon to guide other young people.

== Literary analysis ==
Gender Roles vs. Gender Identity: While gender role is a position that a person chooses to play based on societal norms according to Judith Butler, gender identity is not based on biological origins but is based on “individual performances” (Cohen 14). For a character like Lucy Brewer, both this role and identity are altered especially with the gender-based conceptions of “virtue” (in terms of female chastity) and “male” valor. She fails in preserving her "virtue" when being lured into prostitution, yet compensates this with her unexpected bravery when cross-dressing as her role in the Marine Corp. This sexual deception is praised upon in the form of a reward: reunion with Lucy's male lover. While the act of cross-dressing can imply gender confusion, Lucy seems to cross-dress for the sake of opportunity and escape from the life of prostitution that she endured. Ironically, Lucy decides to risk her life in the war to save her other life at the brothel. For Lucy, a temporary hold on playing her gender role as a woman allows her to alter her gender identity to that of a man. This instantly grants her liberty to act in a more authoritative light, to be more outspoken, to experience the world, and to help others who are oppressed (Example: woman in the carriage ride). Her intention to write this story can also be considered a reflection upon her gender role. By offering advice to younger people, this effort to lead reform can be seen as a motherly act of kindness. Her change in names alone tracks the transformation she undergoes: Lucy Brewer, George Baker, and Lucy West. Her story comes full circle with her departure from Plymouth and return to Plymouth, and her start as a young girl and her return as a young woman. With this change in identity Lucy feels a responsibility to serve others - the intent of her entire story is to guide other young people.

Urban Vice: Disorder among Boston's social classes became a legitimate concern with the growing city following the Revolutionary War. Boston's population grew three times its 18,000-inhabitant number between 1790 and 1825. The overcrowded city allowed for the emergence of vices like crime, violence, drugs, and prostitution, a service that Lucy is tricked into. Major reform efforts began in 1817 when the Boston Female Society for Missionary Purposes hired two preachers to spread the gospel in Boston's vice districts: the West End (“Negro Hill”) and the North End. The Penitent Female's Refuge and a House of Industry were also established to help reform former prostitutes. In 1823, Mayor Josiah Quincy of Boston oversaw America's first police crackdown on prostitution. The setting of The Female Marine serves as a reflection of the people's sentiment pertaining to prostitution and safety of the city during the early 1800s. (Cohen 28)

Image of the Female Warrior: Imagery of the Female Warrior emerges not only from literary tradition but also from social tradition. It was not abnormal for a woman to enter a man's workforce. Between the 16th and 19th centuries, many European and American women cross-dressed to enter the military. These women include Deborah Sampson Gannett who fought in the Revolutionary War followed by Sarah Emma Edmonds and Loreta Janeta Velazquez, two cross-dressing soldiers of the Civil War. For most literary female warriors, the objective of their struggle was to be reunited with friends and family. (Cohen 14) From a literary perspective, the act of cross-dressing to fight has been seen in storylines during the Civil War, Mexican–American War, and War of 1812. Historically, there are estimated to be hundreds of women who cross-dressed on both the Union and Confederate sides for the American Civil War. For women who choose this method of disguise, reward and recognition almost always follow. Whether it is monetary compensation or the positive reaction from the reader, the Female Warrior is easily comprehended as a symbol of strength and defiance.

Romance Novel: The Female Marine is marked as a romance novel specifically due to these aspects of its storyline: “seduction by a dastardly villain; flight through storms; temporary sanctuary with a kindly protectress; ensnarement by a wretched deceiver; a pitiful death of an unwanted child; sermons and lectures on moral fibre; and years of depravity and disillusionment as a fallen woman” as stated by Alexander Mendicott. Lucy's ability to seduce also becomes a vital element in the development of the Romance Novel. (Cohen 19)

Identity Crisis Parallels: Besides the identity crises that people coping with sexuality issues thought of, the New England's identity crisis during the War of 1812 struck direct parallels with those of Lucy Brewer's. Most people in the area either devoted their loyalty to England or exhibited patriotism to the United States. Those who had to accept the United States’ victory had trouble finding their place back in the patriotic realm. Lucy Brewer's life also parallels the ideas of mercantile New England at the time; as Lucy Brewer was seduced and prostituted, New England was "seduced" and "prostituted" by British commerce. As Lucy modified her gender and disguised herself to join the crew of the Constitution, New England changed its own identity by following rules and regulations of the United States Constitution. Lucy restores normalcy to her life by marrying Mr. West, as the United States enters the Era of Good Feelings, a period referred to as a “political covenant” (Cohen 30). It is this linear stage of progression for both the country and Lucy Brewer that strengthens the foundations for further establishing identity and position within the hierarchy of both gender roles and social classes.

== Character list ==
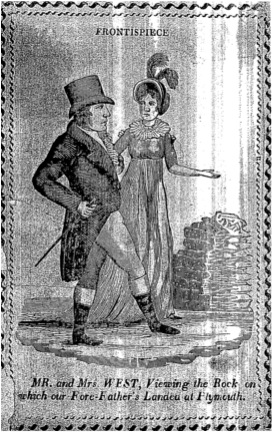
Mr. & Mrs. West celebrating their union

- Louisa Baker, Lucy Brewer, Mrs. West, George, Major B: Plymouth, Massachusetts born maiden who disguised herself as a man and wrote pamphlets on her adventures in New York and Boston dressed as a United States Marine.
- Lucy's parents: Remained nameless throughout the novel to disclose their identity. Lucy Brewer abandoned her parents when she left home to assume a position in the marines.
- Lucy's Father: Likes her fiancé, Mr. West, and gives consent to Mr. West for Lucy's hand in marriage. He also knows of Lucy's Marine experiences.
- Tutoress/Mrs. Rachel Sperry: brothel “mother” to all harlots who reside under her roof on the Hill. Lucy's old tutoress from the brothel refers to Lucy as Miss Bakes and calls her an “ungrateful jilt”, but also titles her as “Major” in conversation. Author of A Brief Reply
- Miss Sampson: disguised herself as a male and took on the name Robert Shurtliff. She served her country as a private soldier, and performed her duty with ease and honor. She served as Lucy Brewer's idol.
- Lucy's commander: Most humane and experienced officer in the American navy, favored Lucy as a marine and respected her.
- Comrade: Exclaimed to Lucy, “ never mind it, George, you have already won laurels sufficient to recommend you to the pretty girls, when you return to port!’’
- Maria Murray: Known by sailors as “Scotch Maria” Lived in the brothel with Lucy Brewer in west Boston hill
- Isabella: Thirty-four-year-old harlot, mother of five children and had been twice lawfully married. Spent two years as a kept miss, and four years as a common prostitute on the Hill. Captivated the attention of a seventeen-year-old boy, leading him to his death.
- William: A seventeen-year-old boy who was captivated with Isabella (the harlot). Died from a sexually transmitted disease shortly after falling victim to his imprudent indulgences.
- Charles West: Lucy refers to him at William when first acquainted. He confesses his affection for Lucy and soon figures out that Lucy is the same woman who portrayed a U.S. Marine in the circulated pamphlets. He signs off “Your sincere well-wisher” and accepts Lucy's cross-dressing.
- Maria D_______: was one of the fairest and sweetest girls Lucy has ever known, but married a man incapable of providing a nurturing a loving marriage. She became a miserable housewife, and he broke his vows and began sleeping with harlots in Boston. She lived in a perpetual winter, fell into depression and died.
- Mrs. Grey: Wife of a very honest and respectable farmer in New Hampshire was forced to join a brothel after getting lost in Boston when visiting her sister in Boston. She could not return to her family because she felt she was no longer respectable as a woman.

== Controversial authorship ==
According to Daniel A. Cohen, editor of The Female Marine and Related Works: Narratives of Cross-Dressing and Urban Vice in America's Early Republic, the true author of The Female Marine was probably Nathaniel Hill Wright. Wright was a young Massachusetts writer acquainted with Nathaniel Coverly, the printer of The Female Marine. Cohen writes:

"At the time of the first appearance of The Female Marine, Nathaniel Hill Wright was in his late twenties, a family man with a wife and at least one small child, evidently struggling to make ends meet. While none of this proves that Wright was the author of the female-marine narratives, his political affiliation, sexual history [his wife bore a child sixth months after their marriage], literary predilections, self-characterization, and personal circumstances – along with the newspaper reference identifying "Mr. Wright" as Coverly's hack – all tend to make him a very plausible candidate."

Nathaniel Coverly was the son of a printer who made a scarce living in Boston by printing cheap pamphlets and broadsides to appeal to the general public. Coverly was an intelligent entrepreneur that knew how to cash in on the citizens patriotism, especially during times of national affairs like the War of 1812. He also knew how to appeal to the prurient passions of his readers, a likely incentive for him to print a series such as The Female Marine. In 1815, Coverly released a pamphlet entitled “The Affecting Narrative of Louisa Baker”, allegedly written by a fake author Luther Wales and printed in New York. Coverly dropped these securities when his pamphlets became a hit, and advertised the second and third episodes in the series with his name as the printer. There is much discrepancy over the true authorship of The Female Marine, and although it is possible Coverly himself wrote the three pamphlets, it is more likely they were developed by a hack author in his employ. An unidentified newspaper reference (found in the collections of the American Antiquarian Society) at the time suggests that Coverly “kept a poet, or ready writer, who manufactured for him all prose and verse articles which were called for by the occasions of the time.” This author, Mr. Nathaniel Hill Wright, was described as “a comical genius, who could do the grave or the gay, as necessity demanded, and with equal facility.” Such qualifications make a versatile genius like Wright the ideal author for the playful and eclectic story of the Female Marine. Nathaniel Hill Wright was an obscure printer, publisher, editor and poet born in Concord, Massachusetts in 1787 as the youngest son of Amos Wright, a local tavern keeper. Wright wrote and produced several volumes of verse under his own name in the early 19th century, but like Coverly, struggled to stay afloat while taking care of his wife and small child, especially during the war. While no written evidence proves that Wright wrote The Female Marine, the evidence, as stated by David Cohen, is strong to support that Wright was the true author.

== Historical context ==
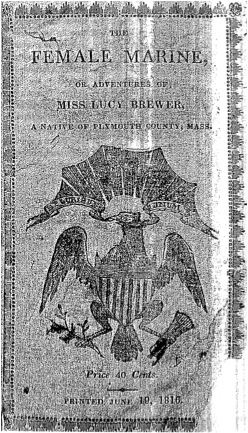
First Publication Cover (1815)

The Female Marine was first published in 1815, directly after the conclusion of the War of 1812, and features an autobiographical account of many famous events during the war. The War of 1812 had a large impact on Boston, the setting of the story, as the Atlantic Theatre of the war was fought over Britain's trade restrictions due to its ongoing war with France as well as the impressment of American merchant sailors into the Royal navy. During the war, heavy blockades were set up around port cities like Boston, and exports suffered heavily, making the war very unpopular to merchants in these cities. However, there was still cause for a strong sense of patriotism during the time, which Wright would exploit in his writing of The Female Marine. During the War of 1812, the American Navy achieved their first naval victory against the British fleet with the USS Constitution. The Constitution was built to protect the ports of Boston, and became a potent symbol of national military prowess. After a battle with the British warship Guirriere, the public affectionately dubbed the Constitution, “Old Ironsides”, firmly establishing her popularity in the eyes of the people. Her popularity has continued through today, as the world's oldest floating commissioned naval vessel. Wright chose the Constitution as the ship Brewer would hide herself aboard as it was one of the most famous ships and most patriotic symbols of the country at the time.

== Contemporary reaction ==
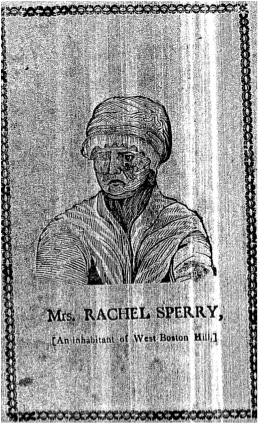
Rachel Sperry, author of A Brief Reply

Nathaniel Coverly's audience was mainly a mash of sailors, prostitutes, and juveniles. This was due in part to the subject matter of his writing, which was often too vulgar for the upper classes, but his broadsides and pamphlets were very modestly priced, and were thus affordable to all but the most impoverished people. Coverly sought the same audience with the publication of The Female Marine, although he particularly targeted the juveniles, noting in the third part of the series that it was “worthy the perusal of young persons of both sexes, and of all classes.” Due to the popularity of the three part series, Coverly produced additional spinoffs, one allegedly written by Rachel Sperry, the madam of the brothel in which Baker claims to have been entrapped. In her “Brief Reply to the Late Writings of Louisa Baker”, Sperry reveals Baker's true name as Eliza Bowen and denounces the claim that Baker, now Bowen, had ever been unwilling to serve in prostitution. These spinoffs never achieved the success of the original three in the series and so were quickly cut short. However, at least 19 editions of The Female Marine were published between 1815 and 1818, a prominent show of its wild popularity at the time of its publication.

== Social perspectives ==
Judith Butler consolidated a new gender theory focusing on “performativity”. In recent times new gender roles like “performativity” are more widely accepted and enable society to more likely accept phenomena such as crossdressing or transgender bodies. Society is the main proprietor of gender and how it is perceived by the people, and this perception differs across the globe. John Money coined the term gender in 1955 and said that gender is based on the social enactment of sex roles, which is exactly what Lucy Brewer explored in her disguise as a marine to live, fight and act as a man. Brewer knew what it meant to be a woman and what opportunities were given to men stepping outside of her comfort zone with tremendous success. She took great risks in assuming a male role in society to fully explore the other side of the gender role. Brewer was mindful of the male ego and physical thirsts quenched by the allure of women desirous of men in uniform. The strength of the characteristics which define masculinity are due to bodily performance, but Lucy Brewer excelled as a marine in flexing her muscle as she fired a musket just well as any soldier could take aim and fire. Her character challenged the role of masculinity in her time period proving that women can assume the male gender role with relative ease and that it is indeed possible to explore gender outside of what is marked “socially acceptable” and still be respected in society. Lucy's crossdressing would be perceived by society no differently today than in the past. Regardless of how judgmental mankind is through the hardwiring of male and female mindset across America, a sense of humanity and empathy reigns in us whether born male or female. When Lucy's pamphlets circulated, people were not overly shocked or appalled by her actions, but rather intrigued that woman was able to conquer the male role. Society's overall reaction was a reflection on how it evolved and had become more apt to accept transgender actions as well as cross-dressing.
