= Manchu Princess, Japanese Spy =

Biography in English of Kawashima Yoshiko, the Chinese princess

- First edition cover
- Author: Phyllis Birnbaum
- Publisher: Columbia University Press
- Publication date: 2015

Manchu Princess, Japanese Spy: The Story of Kawashima Yoshiko, the Cross-Dressing Spy Who Commanded Her Own Army is a 2015 book by Phyllis Birnbaum, published by Columbia University Press.

It is about Yoshiko Kawashima and covers it up to the point of her trial. According to the author, the reputation of Kawashima being a soldier and spy was likely inflated.

== Background ==
The author previously had translated existing works and wrote her own books, including novels. She also served as a historian, focusing on Japan. The author conducted interviews, including of Kawashima's relatives who were still alive.

== Contents ==
Two chapters are not about Kawashima per se but instead focus on others: one on her father and another on Hiro Saga, to which Kawashima is compared. Stephen Joyce of the Asian Review of Books wrote that "While interesting, these chapters feel like separate academic essays or history magazine articles rather than elements of a cohesive biography."

== Reception ==
Joyce described it as "In some ways [...] an unconventional biography".

Iain Maloney of The Japan Times wrote that because the author was careful to only present information for which actual historical evidence existed, readers expecting colorful accounts of the "myth" behind Kawashima may be disappointed, and that as there is more verified information available, the second part of the book had a better "pace". Maloney concluded "Kawashima was irrepressible and so is her story, refusing to conform to a conventional biography."

Jamie Fisher of The New York Times wrote that the book "grasps at but never quite captures Yoshiko’s spirit".

Daniel A. Métraux of Mary Baldwin University wrote that the book is "a fine history" and concluded that it is "a fascinating tale".

== See also ==
- Bibliography of works on wartime cross-dressing
