= Riggs =

Riggs is an English surname. Notable people with the surname include:

- Allison Riggs (born 1980 or 1981), American jurist from North Carolina
- Anna Rankin Riggs (1835–1908), American social reformer
- Arthur Riggs (geneticist) (1939–2022), American geneticist
- Arthur Stanley Riggs (1879–1952), American author and historian
- Bobby Riggs (1918–1995), American tennis player
- Chandler Riggs (born 1999), American actor
- Christina Riggs, British-American historian
- Christina Marie Riggs (1971–2000), American murderer
- Cody Riggs (born 1991), American football player
- Dax Riggs (born 1973), American musician
- Derek Riggs (born 1958), British artist
- Dudley Riggs (1932–2020), American comedian
- Dudley Riggs (American football) (1875–1913), American football player
- Elmer S. Riggs (1869–1963), American paleontologist
- Frank Riggs (1950–2023), American politician
- George Washington Riggs (1813–1881), American banker and businessman
- Gerald Riggs (born 1960), American football player
- Grattan Riggs (1835–1899), US-Australian "Irish" actor
- James Garland Riggs (born 1941), American saxophonist
- Jerry Riggs (born 1956), American musician
- Joe Riggs (born 1982), American mixed martial artist
- John M. Riggs, American army general
- John Mankey Riggs (1811–1885), American dentist
- Lawrason Riggs (1861–1940), American businessman and art collector
- Layne Riggs (born 2002), American race car driver
- Lutah Maria Riggs (1896–1984), American architect
- Marcia Y. Riggs, American scholar, professor and theologian
- Marlon Riggs (1957–1994), American poet, educator, filmmaker, and activist
- Mike Riggs (born 1971), American guitarist
- Moses Riggs (1795–1886), American architect
- Nina Riggs (1977–2017), American writer and poet
- Richard William Riggs (1938–2022), American jurist
- Scott Riggs (born 1971), American race car driver
- Scotty Riggs (born 1971), American professional wrestler
- Sheila M. Riggs, American dentistry academic
- Thomas Riggs, Jr. (1873–1945), American politician and engineer
- William "Billy" Riggs, American professor, author, engineer, urban planner and musician

== Fictional characters ==
- Jessica Riggs, character in Prancer
- Martin Riggs, a police officer in Lethal Weapon
- Mr. Riggs, character in Under Capricorn
- Mrs. Riggs, character in Under Capricorn

== Other uses ==
- Scotty Riggs (born 1971), ring name of American wrestler Scott Antol
- Riggs, a rock band; see Jerry Riggs
- Riggs' disease
- Riggs, Missouri
- Riggs Glacier
- Riggs Bank, former bank in the Washington, D.C., area
- Riggs-Tompkins Building, listed on the National Register of Historic Places in Washington, D.C.

== See also ==
- Rig (disambiguation)
- Rigg (disambiguation)
- Rigging
