= Rig =

Rig or RIG may refer to:

== Objects and structures ==
- Rig (fishing), an arrangement of items used for fishing
- Drilling rig, a structure housing equipment used to drill or extract oil from underground
- Rig (stage lighting)
- rig, a horse-drawn carriage together with the horses and harness
- rig, something that a dog pulls when mushing
- Rig (sailing), the configuration of sails and masts on a sailing vessel
- rig, a parachute system in skydiving
- rig, a transmitter, receiver, or transceiver in amateur radio
- Oil rig
- rig, a tractor unit
- rig, a desktop computer

== Acronym ==
- RIG, the ticker symbol for Transocean, a Swiss offshore drilling company
- Radio Independents Group, a UK trade organisation
- Reykjavik International Games, a sport event taking place in Iceland
- Recueil des inscriptions gauloises, a collection of Gaulish language inscriptions
- Rabies immunoglobulin, a medication against the rabies virus

== Places ==
- Rig, an alternate name for Bandar Rig, a city in Bushehr Province, Iran
- Rig District, a district in Bushehr Province, Iran
- Rig Rural District, a rural district in Chaharmahal and Bakhtiari Province, Iran
- Rig, Gilan, a village in Gilan Province, Iran
- Rig, Jask, a village in Hormozgan Province, Iran
- Rig, Lirdaf, a village in Hormozgan Province, Iran
- Rig castle, in Kashmar County, Iran
- Rig, an alternate name for Rig-e Bala, a village in South Khorasan Province, Iran
- Rig, West Virginia, an unincorporated community in the US
- Pearland Stadium, or The Rig, a stadium in Texas, United States
- Rio Grande Airport, IATA code: RIG, an airport in Brazil
- Raigarh railway station (station code: RIG) in Chhattisgarh, India

== Other uses ==
- rig (mathematics) or semiring, a structure similar to rings without the requirement that elements should have additive inverses
- ríg or rí, Irish language word for "king"
- rig or run rig, a traditional system of land occupation in Scotland
- Ridgling, or rig, a male animal with one or both testicles undescended
- rig, to engage in cheating during a game, election, etc.
- Ríg (Norse god) or Heimdall, the father of mankind in Norse mythology
- rigging or skeletal animation, grouping the elements of parts such as limbs in an animated 3D computer model
- Rig (Dead or Alive), a fictional character from Dead or Alive video game series
- Spotted estuary smooth-hound (Mustelus lenticulatus), a fish
- The Rig (TV series), an upcoming series for Amazon Prime Video
- Gaming rig, a personal computer designed for video games
- RIGS: Mechanized Combat League, a video game

== See also ==
- Big Rig (disambiguation)
- Rigg (disambiguation)
- Rigger (disambiguation)
- Rigging (disambiguation)
- Riggs, a surname
- Rigveda, in Hinduism, a sacred collection of Vedic Sanskrit hymns dedicated to the gods
- Rigged (book), a 2007 book by author Ben Mezrich
