= John Riggs =

John Riggs may refer to:

- John M. Riggs (born 1946), retired U.S. Army general
- John Mankey Riggs (1811–1885), first American dentist specializing in periodontology
- Jack Riggs (born 1954), American politician

== See also ==
- John Riggins (born 1949), former American football running back
