= Rigging (disambiguation) =

Rigging is the system of ropes, cables and chains, which support the mast(s) of a sailing vessel and which adjust the position of the vessel's sails and the spars to which they are attached.

Rigging may also refer to:

== Nautical ==
- Standing rigging, the rigging that supports masts on sailing vessels.
- Running rigging, the rigging that is used to adjust the position of sails.
- Rowing apparatus in a boat, see Glossary of rowing terms

== Other ==
- Rigging, ropes and ladders used in caving
- Rigging (material handling), any form of lifting gear, tackle, equipment for moving heavy loads over short distances, etc. and the procedures of lifting and moving heavy loads.
- Rigging (parachuting), the collective name for any tasks related to the assembly, inspection, maintenance and repair of parachuting equipment. The person trained for those tasks is called a rigger.
- Entertainment rigging, rigging used for lights, curtains, and other equipment in exposed-structure venues, including theatres, arenas, convention centers, ballrooms, warehouses, etc.
  - Theatrical rigging, as used in live-stage theatres and similar venues, more specifically
  - Aerial rigging, setting up apparatus for circus aerial acts, such as trapeze
- Match fixing
- Vote rigging, illegally interfering in the counting of votes in an election
- Rodeo bareback rigging, riding equipment
- Skeletal rigging, the preparation of a 3D graphics model (mesh) for animation, by programming points of articulation in the figure

== See also ==
- Rig (disambiguation)
- Rigged, original title of Fight Night (film)
- Rigged, a 2007 book by Ben Mezrich
