= Spreader =

Spreader may refer to:

- Broadcast spreader, an agricultural machinery or lawn care tool designed to spread seed, fertilizer, lime, sand, ice melt, etc.
- Spreader (railroad), a kind of maintenance of way equipment designed to spread or shape ballast profiles
- Hydraulic spreader, a tool used by emergency crews in vehicle extrication
- Spreader (sailboat), a spar on a sailboat used to deflect the shrouds to allow them to better support the mast
- Spreader bar, a BDSM bondage device
- Spreader beam, a lifting device used to distribute forces appropriately for structural or interference reasons
- Container spreader, a tool used for lifting containers and unitized cargo
- Manure spreader, an agricultural machinery designed to spread manure
- Spreader (mining), a heavy equipment used in surface mining and mechanical engineering/civil engineering
