= Rigging (material handling) =

Equipment and procedure in material handling

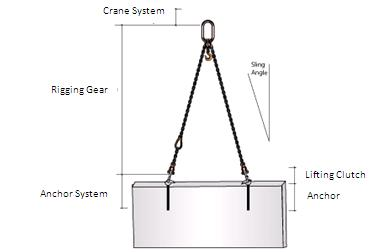
One of the most basic types of rigging.

Rigging is both a noun (equipment), and verb, (the action of designing and installing the equipment), in preparation to move objects. A team of riggers design and install the equipment needed to position (raise, roll, slide or lift) objects such as heavy machinery, structural components, building materials, or large-scale fixtures with a crane, hoist or block and tackle.

Rigging comes from rig, to set up or prepare. Rigging is equipment such as wire rope, turnbuckles, clevis, jacks used with cranes and other lifting equipment in material handling and structure relocation. Rigging systems commonly include shackles, master links and slings, and lifting bags (for underwater lifting).

In the United States the Occupational Safety and Health Administration (OSHA) regulates workplace safety including rigging in CFR 1926.251.

The Health and Safety Executive is responsible for these matters in the United Kingdom.

== Applications ==
In manufacturing and construction, rigging includes precision relocation of industrial equipment within active facilities. Common techniques involve the use of hydraulic toe jacks, low-profile machinery skates, and portable gantry systems for moving loads in confined spaces where cranes cannot operate. Rigging contractors coordinate with millwrights and safety inspectors to ensure compliance with occupational safety codes. Training standards, such as the Infrastructure Health and Safety Association's Hoisting and Rigging Safety Manual (Canada), emphasize hazard assessments, proper sling angles, and equipment inspections before every lift.

== Equipment ==
Rigging-related equipment includes:

- Block (sailing)
- Cargo net
- Chain
- Chain hoist
- Come-along
- Crane (machine)
- Hook
- Hoist (device)
- Jack (device)
- Knot
- Lever
- Lifting bag
- Lifting beam
- Link (chain)
- Pry bar
- Rope
- Shackle
- Sheave
- Sling (rigging)
- Rope splicing
- Tackle
- Tirfor
- Turnbuckle
- Wire rope
- Winch

== Procedures ==
In order to rig, standard steps are followed, to ensure safety and efficiency:

=== Planning ===
First, determine the mass, dimensions and center of gravity of the load. This information and the load environment determine the needed lifting gear.

=== Inspection ===
The rigger checks slings, hooks, shackles, and lifting appliances for wear, damage, or expiry of certification.

=== Rigging ===
Rig lifting gear properly loads anchor points utilizing proper rigging methods such as vertical, basket, or choker hitches.

=== Communication ===
All members present are notified via hand signals or radio communication before initiating the lift.

=== Lift ===
The load is lifted slowly and gradually while balancing and stabilizing. Taglines control load movement.

=== Inspection ===
Once the load is in place, the rigging gets removed, and gear is checked prior to storage.

=== Rigging Costs: Key Factors That Influence Pricing and Project Planning ===
Rigging projects involve precise planning to lift, position, or remove heavy industrial equipment safely. The total rigging cost depends on several factors, including the weight and dimensions of the machine, the type of lift required, the access challenges inside the facility, and the equipment needed—such as forklifts, cranes, skates, or custom rigging gear. Proper preparation also plays a major role: confirming floor capacities, measuring travel paths, identifying obstructions, securing power or utilities, and coordinating labour all influence both the price and the timeline. This guide outlines how rigging costs are calculated and the preparation steps needed to complete a safe and efficient lift.

== Safety ==
Safety is a top priority whilst rigging, given the typically heavy loads. Dropped loads, equipment failure, and pinch trauma are all potential risks. Safety measures include:

- Training and certification – Only trained riggers and signalmen carry out or supervise rigging operations.
- PPE – Riggers wear hard hats, gloves, steel-toed boots, and high-visibility vests.
- Load limits – Working load limit (WLL) are strictly observed.
- Load path awareness – People must be separate from suspended loads.
- Weather considerations – Windy, low-visibility weather conditions increase hazards.
- Taglines – Taglines prevent excessive load swinging.

== Gallery ==
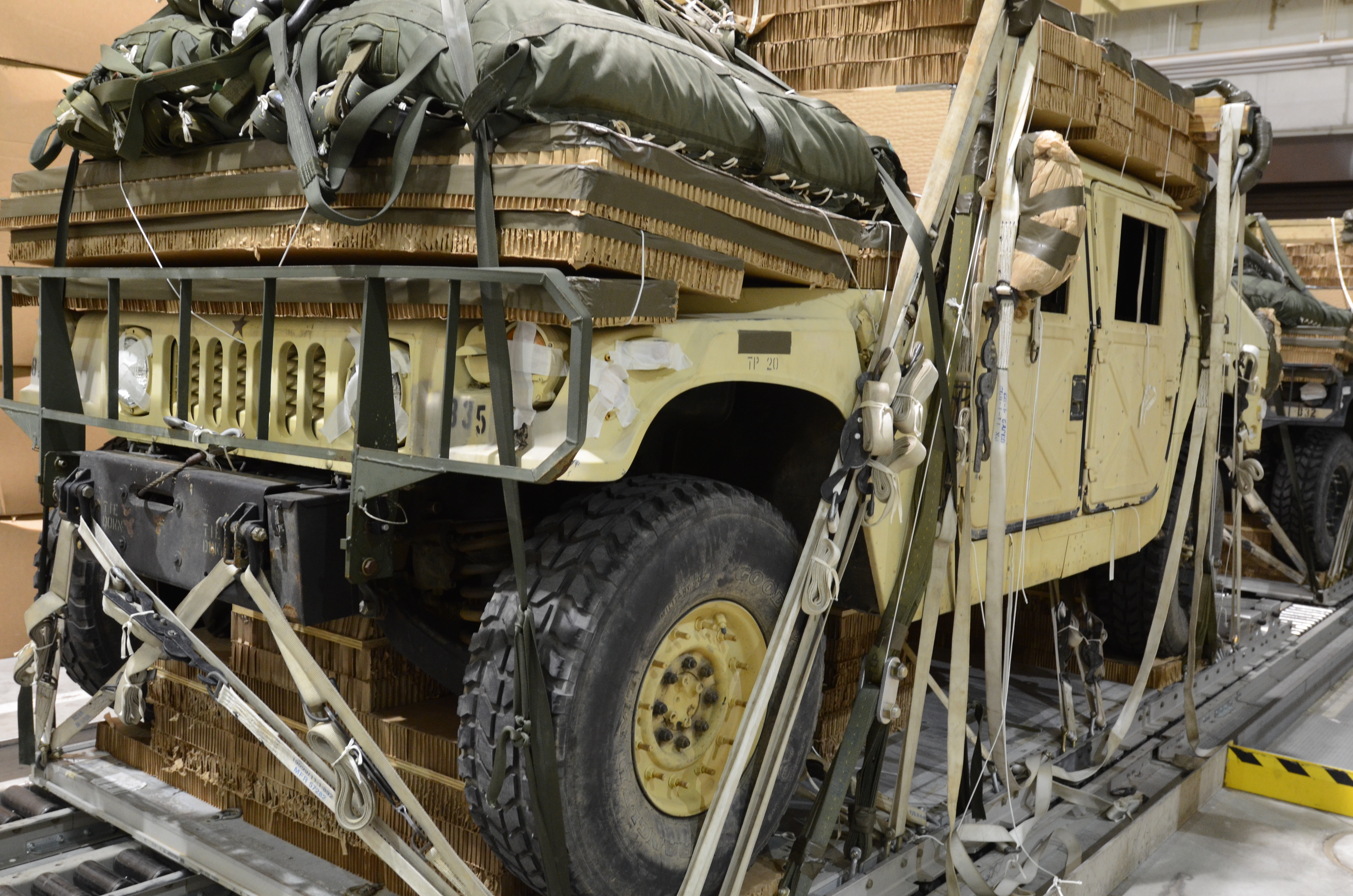
A Humvee is rigged for being airdropped at the Heavy Drop Rigging Facility near Pope Field at Fort Bragg, N.C.

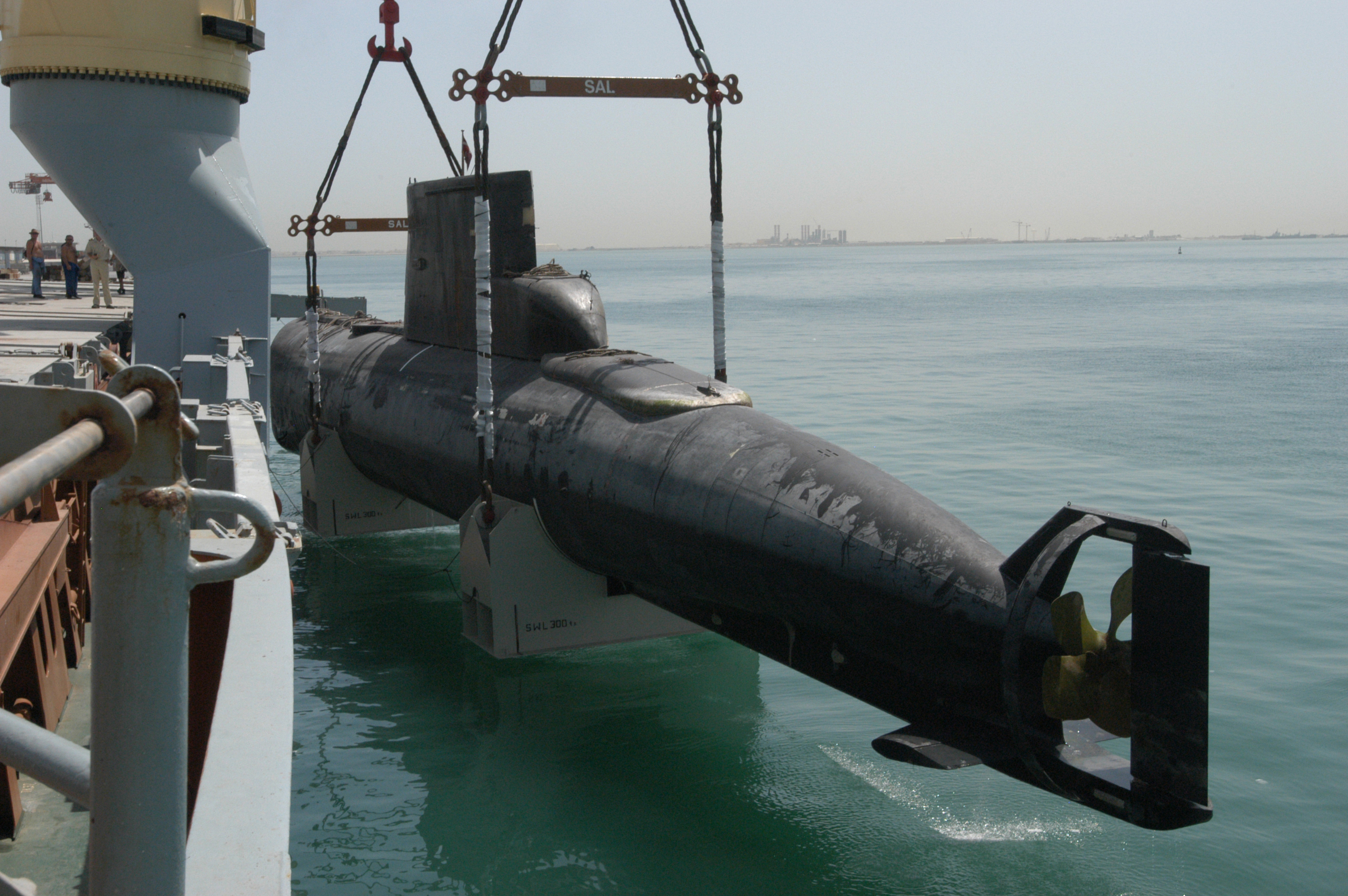
The rigging is the two frameworks, spreaders, wire ropes and related fittings used by the crane to pick up this submarine.

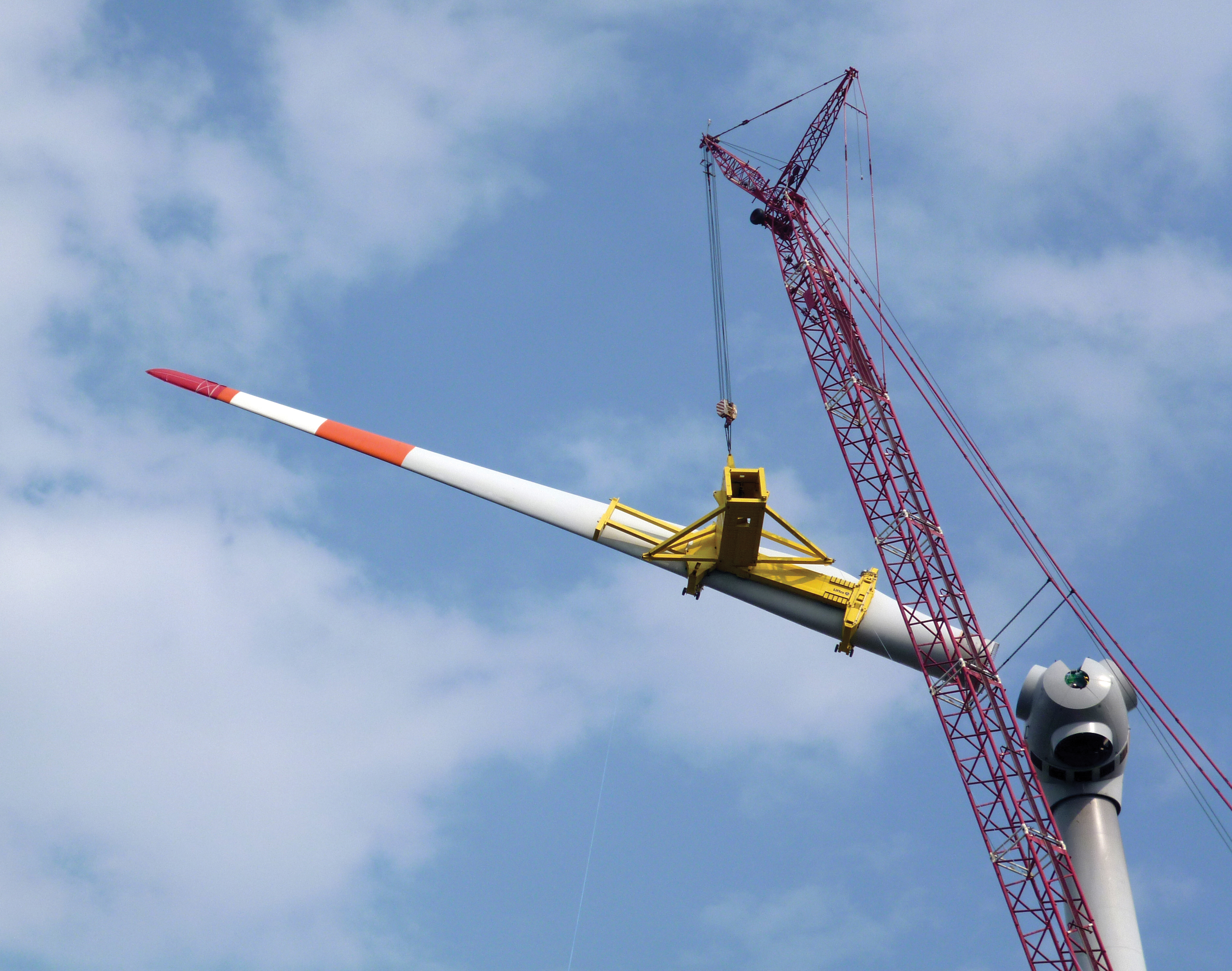
An advanced rigging challenge assembling a wind turbine.

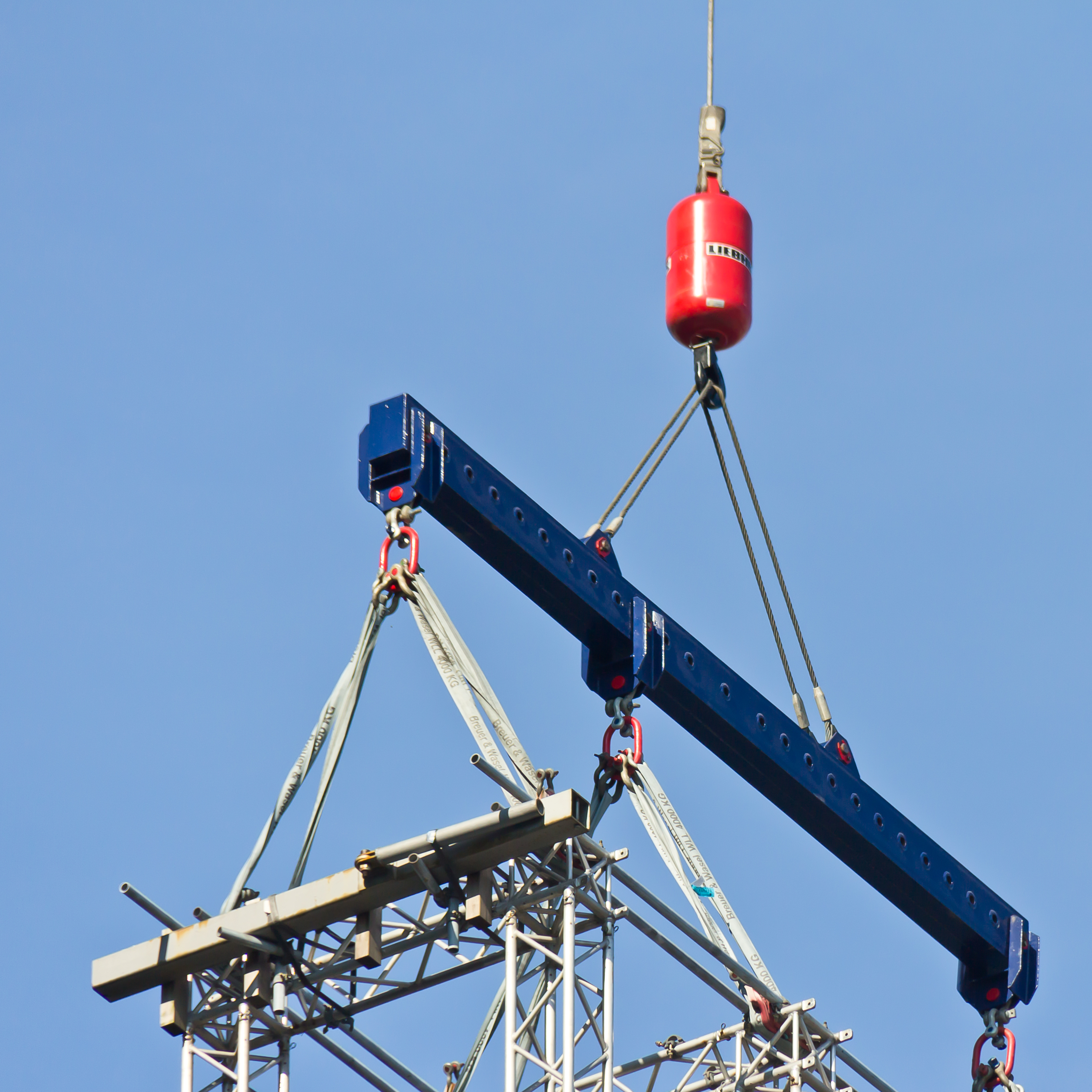
An adjustable spreader bar with webbing slings.

== See also ==
- Entertainment rigging
- Boat rigging
- Parachute rigger
- High lead logging
