= Container crane =

Type of dockside gantry crane

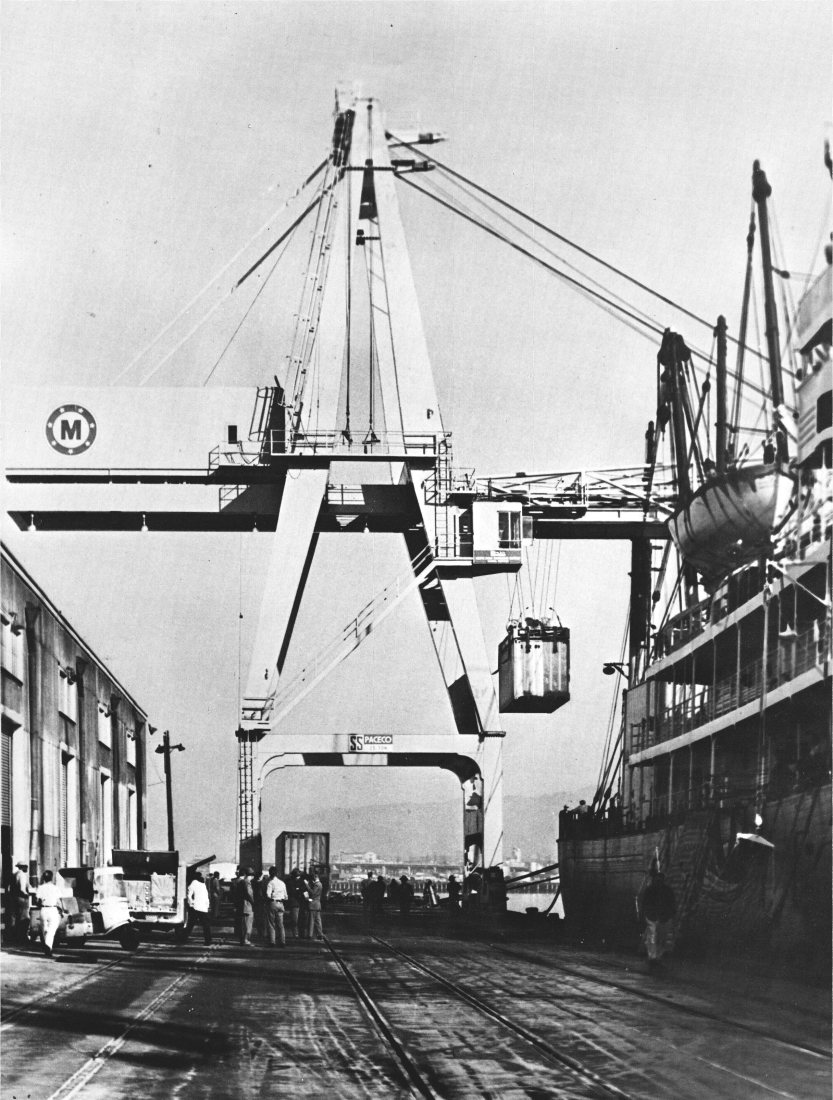
An example of Paceco's early ship-to-shore crane

A container crane, also known as a container-handling gantry crane or ship-to-shore (STS) crane, is a type of large dockside gantry crane found at container terminals for loading and unloading intermodal containers from container ships.

Container cranes consist of a supporting framework that can traverse the length of a quay or yard on a rail track. Instead of a hook, they are equipped with a specialized handling tool called a spreader. The spreader can be lowered on top of a container and locks onto the container's four locking points ("corner castings") using a twistlock mechanism. Cranes normally transport a single container at once, but some newer cranes have the capability to pick up two to four 20-foot containers at once.

== History ==
Cranes were used in harbors starting in the Middle Ages (see crane: harbor usage and list of historical harbour cranes). Modern inter-modal containerization emerged in the mid-1950s from transport strategies developed in the Second World War and the Korean War, and the development of specialized cranes paralleled developments in containerization.

The first container crane was built by PACECO Corp. for Matson Navigation at the Encinal Terminal in Alameda, California in 1959.

== Types ==
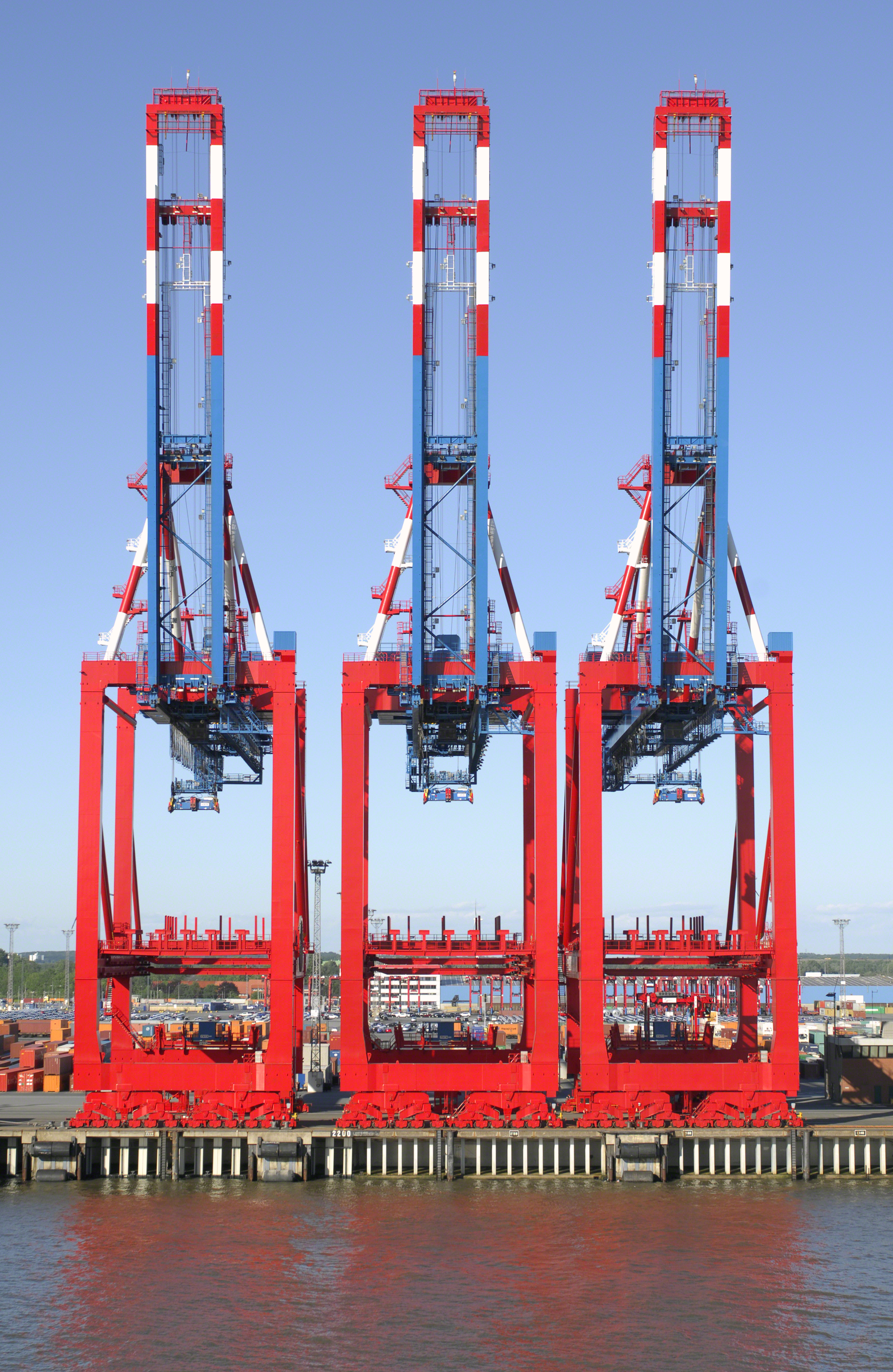
Straight-Boom Cranes in the Port of Bremerhaven

There are three common configurations of container handling gantry cranes. Straight-boom cranes have a fixed girder extending over the wharf and backland and a boom that remains straight while being rotated into a stowed position that allows safe ship maneuvering. Articulated-boom cranes have the same fixed girder, but the boom is hinged to bend as it is rotated up, with the outer portion remaining roughly level. This configuration lowers the overall height of the crane when the boom is stowed, allowing deployment under aircraft clearance surfaces. Low-profile cranes combine the girder and boom in a single rigid structure that slides toward the land for stowage or out over the ship for operations. This configuration is much heavier and more expensive than straight- or articulated-boom cranes, places much greater loads on the supporting wharf, and is only used under very restrictive air clearance conditions. The type of crane selected during the container terminal design process is determined by the design vessel and local operating and infrastructure environment.

== Sizes ==
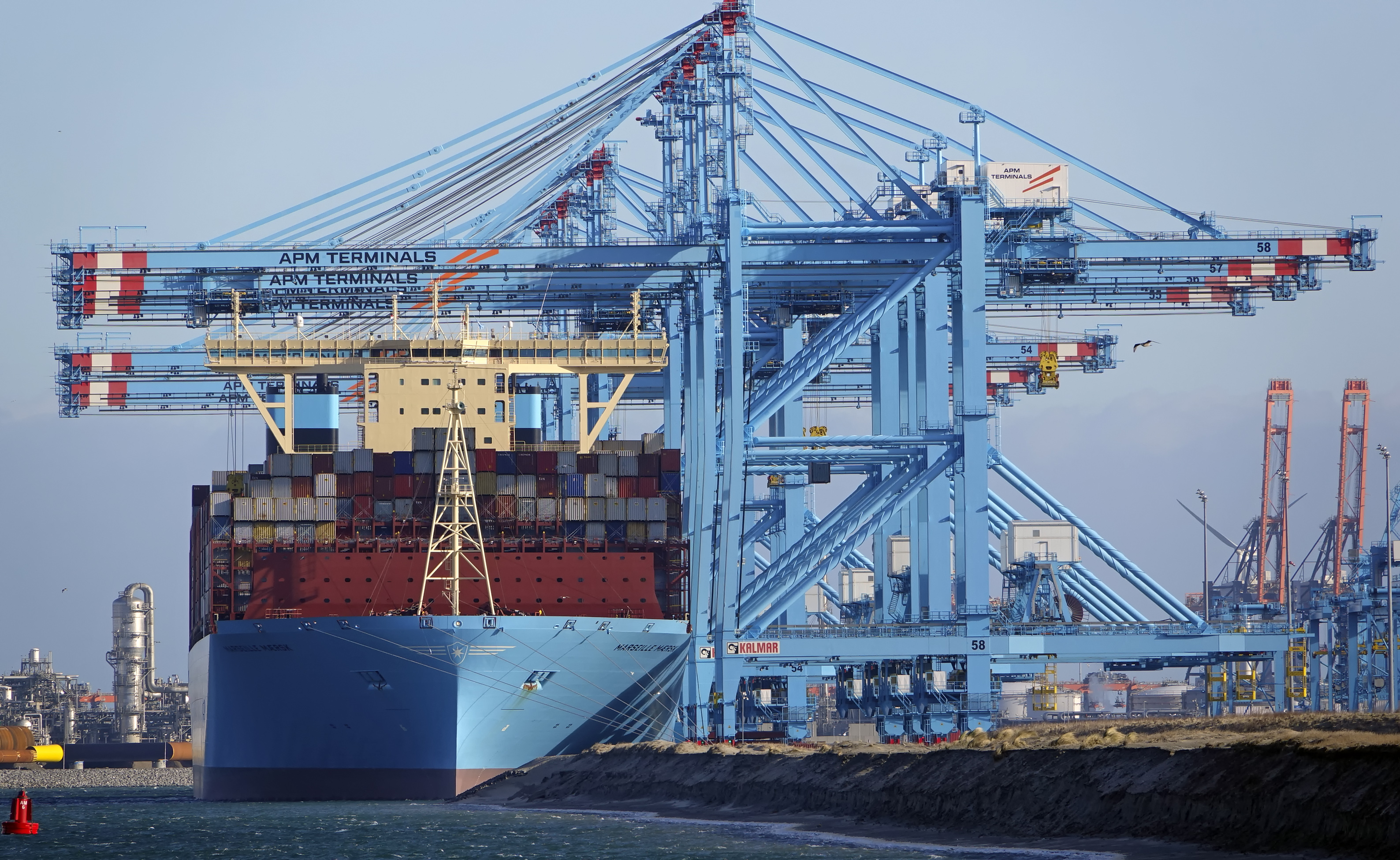
Straight-boom super-post-Panamax modified A-Frame dual-hoist cranes in the Port of Rotterdam. These cranes have an outreach of 25 vessel container stacks.

Container cranes are generally classified by their lifting capacity and the size of the container ships they can load and unload.

=== Smaller sizes ===
The original container gantry cranes were built to serve modest-sized ships. These cranes were of the "A-Frame" structural configuration and were the driving engines in the early growth of containerization. The gantry rail gauge of these cranes was typically 12 to 16 meters (35 to 50 feet), and outreach and lift height were constrained. As ships grew in size and more cranes were assigned to each ship, docks had to get wider, gauges increased to 33 m (100 feet), and the "modified A-Frame" design became the standard. Smaller container cranes, usually without a moveable boom, are still used to serve barges and similar vessels at inland ports.

=== Panamax ===
A Panamax crane can fully load and unload containers from the largest ship capable of passing through the original Panama Canal locks. These typically had on-deck storage up to 13 container stacks wide, each up to five containers high. The great majority of these cranes were built with 100-foot (33-meter) gantry rail gauges, even where metric infrastructure was the norm, as having a common gauge allowed used cranes to be resold from port to port.

=== Post-Panamax ===
A "post-Panamax" crane can load and unload containers from a container ship too wide to pass through the original Panama Canal locks. The first such ships were built in the early- to mid-1980s by American President Lines, along with the cranes needed to serve them. These ships had on-deck storage up to 16 container stacks wide, each up to six containers high, and were originally confined to trans-Pacific operations. As ship propulsion systems continued to advance, ship size capacity continued to increase, but mostly in terms of vessel length and height. Eventually, operating economics and propulsion advances drove vessels to increased width once again, driving the development of the next generation of cranes.

=== Super-post-Panamax ===
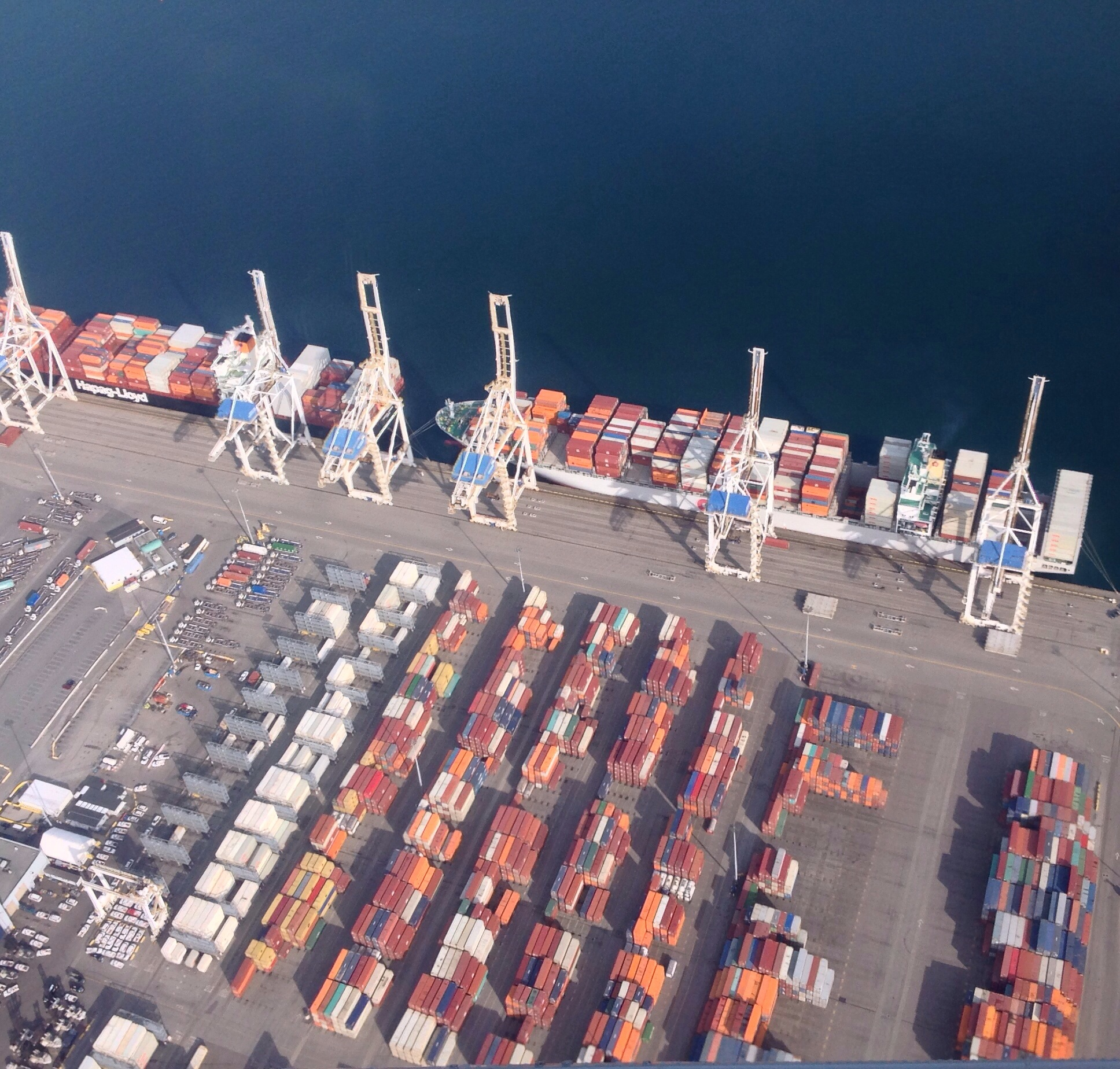
Roberts Bank Superport aerial view (2014)

The largest modern container cranes are classified as "super-post-Panamax". A modern container crane capable of lifting two 20-foot (6.1 m) long containers at once (end to end) under the telescopic spreader will generally have a rated lifting capacity of 65 tonnes. Some new cranes have a 120-tonne load capacity, enabling them to lift up to four 20-foot (6.1 m) or two 40-foot (12 m) containers. Cranes capable of lifting six 20-foot containers have also been designed. Post-Panamax cranes weigh approximately 800–900 tonnes, while the newer-generation super-post-Panamax cranes can weigh 1,600–2,000 tonnes. The largest Super-post-Panamax cranes have an outreach of 26 on-deck container stacks, each up to eight or nine containers high.

== Operation ==
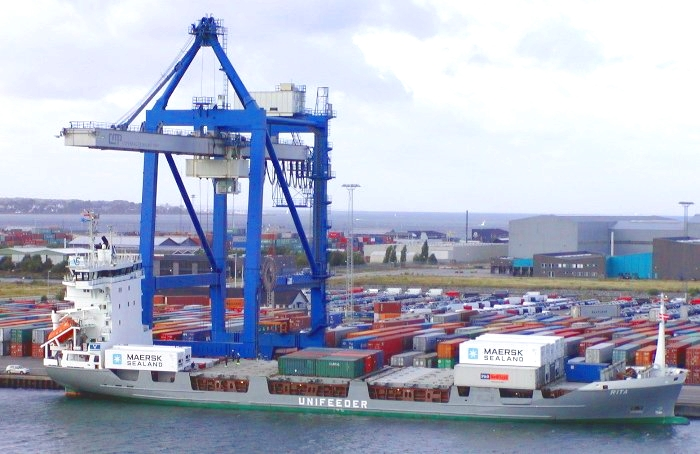
Most of the containers on the Rita have been discharged by cranes similar to this one, in the Port of Copenhagen

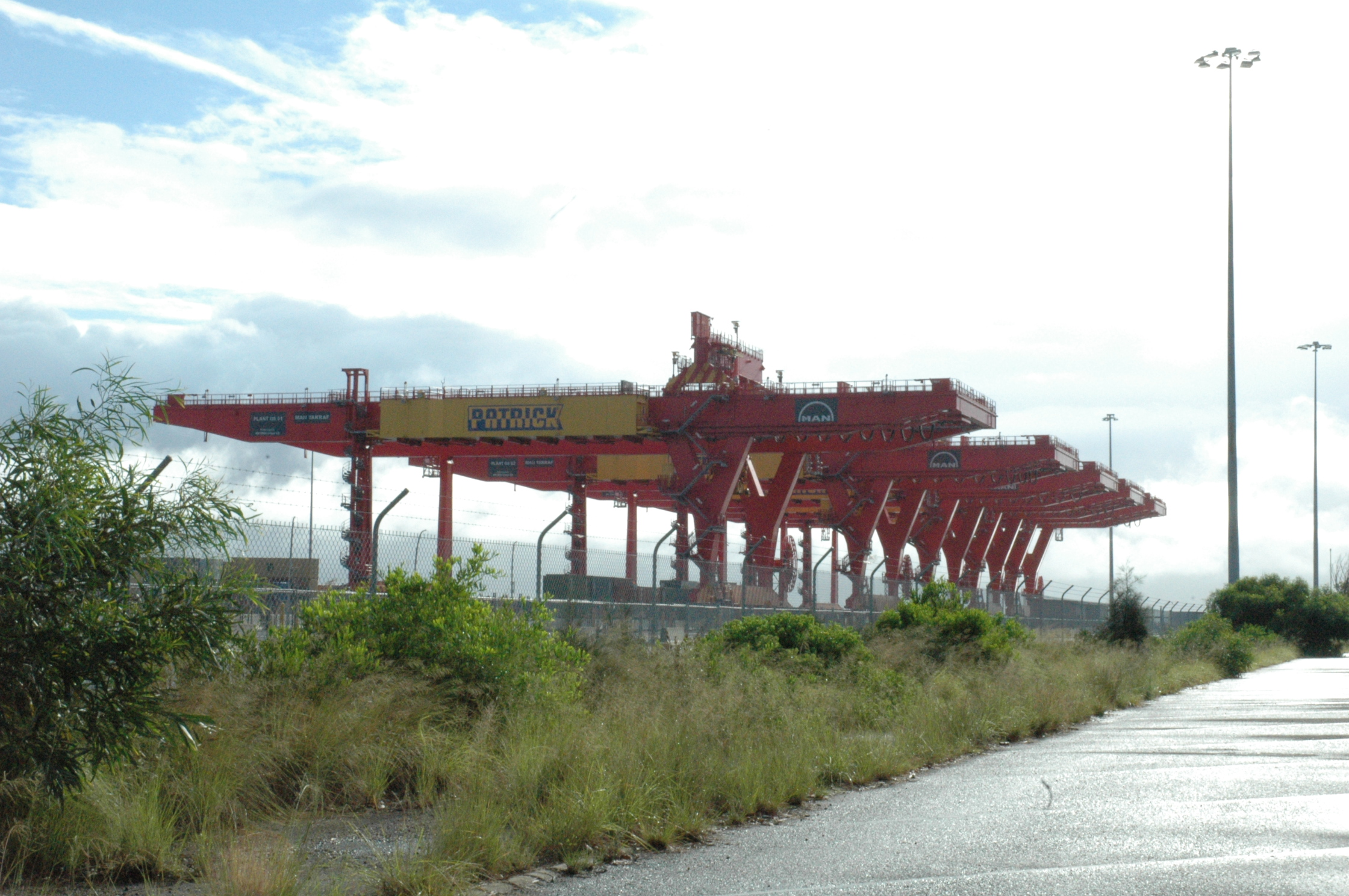
A MAN AG container crane belonging to Patrick Corporation at Port Botany, New South Wales, Australia.

The crane is driven by an operator who sits in a cabin suspended from the trolley. The trolley runs along rails located on the top or sides of the boom and girder. The operator runs the trolley over the ship to lift the cargo, usually containers. Once the spreader locks onto the container, the container is lifted, moved over the dock, and placed on a truck chassis (trailer) or automated guided vehicle (AGV), or set on the ground for transport to the storage yard. The crane also loads containers transported from the storage yard. Most operations are done as "single cycles": moving one container from the ship to the dock, or from the dock to the ship. In some cases, "double cycle" operations allow movement of a container in each direction in one work cycle.

If containers are set directly on the dock, Straddle carriers are usually used for yard transport, rapidly moving them between the dock and the storage yard. Flatcars or well cars are not usually loaded directly beneath the crane base, as such work has very low productivity.

In some cases, cranes are equipped with a second trolley mounted the crane portal beams. The ship-side trolley moves containers between a ship and an intermediate platform. A shore-side trolley moves containers between the intermediate platform and the dock. Depending on the port and vessel logistics, such cranes can provide higher productivity than single-trolley cranes and can provide better support to marine terminal automation.

The crane spreaders are suspended with wire ropes configured into a reeving pattern that provides some stability for the suspended load. Some cranes are equipped with dynamic load stabilization designed into the reeving system. Even with such stabilization, controlling the pendulum swing as the container moves vertically and horizontally between dock and ship requires operator skill and experience. Strong winds make this even more difficult. Crane operations are generally halted at wind speeds above about 22 m/s. At higher wind speeds, the cranes are driven along the dock to be secured to hard points in the dock structure.

Full automation of dockside container cranes is made difficult by swaying of the load and by the constant small movements of the ship, under the influence of wind, tides, currents, vessel deformation, and shifting of the load on the vessel.

== Power ==
A crane can be powered by two types of power supply: a diesel engine–driven generator located on top of the crane or electric power from the dock. The most common is by electric power from the dock (also known as shore power). The voltage required may range from 4,000 to 13,200 volts A/C, with most new cranes at the higher end of this range. Internally, the shore power is typically converted to direct current, then transformed to variable-frequency/variable voltage alternating current for the hoist, trolley, gantry, and boom hoist motors.

== See also ==
- Gantry crane
- Rubber tyred gantry crane
- Straddle carrier
