= Rigg =

Rigg comes from the Scottish and Northern English word for "ridge", as in the medieval "ridge and furrow" system of farming, or run rig land allocation. It may refer to:

== People ==
- A. G. Rigg (1937–2019), British mediaevalist and academic
- Archibald G. Rigg (1878–1959), Canadian-born American architect
- Archibald Rigg (1865–1918), New Zealand cricketer
- Archie Rigg (c.1872–1951), English rugby union and rugby league footballer
- Basil Rigg (1925–2025), Australian cricketer
- Bert Rigg (1923–2015), Australian cricketer
- Bryan Mark Rigg (born 1971), American author and speaker
- Caroline Rigg (1852–1929), British educator, school founder, and headmistress
- Chris Rigg (born 2007), English footballer
- Clem Rigg (1899–1966), English footballer
- Diana Rigg (1938–2020), English actress
- Eddie Rigg (1919–1991), British motorcycle racer
- Edwin Augustus Rigg (1822–1882), 49er, officer in the American Civil War and the Apache Wars
- Elizabeth Schultz Rigg (1921–2001), American pianist, cabaret performer, dancer, and philanthropist
- George Rigg (1814–1887), Scottish Roman Catholic bishop
- George Burton Rigg (1872–1961), American botanist and ecologist
- James F. Rigg (1915–2004), US Navy Ace pilot
- James Harrison Rigg (1821–1909), English nonconformist minister and Methodist educator
- John Rigg (1858–1943), New Zealand politician
- Keith Rigg (1906–1995), Australian cricketer
- Rebecca Rigg (born 1967), Australian actress
- Richard Rigg (British politician) (1877–1942), British barrister and Liberal MP
- Richard Rigg (Canadian politician) (1872–1964), Canadian minister and politician
- Sean Rigg (born 1988), English footballer
- Steven Rigg (born 1992), English footballer
- Suzanne Rigg (born 1963), British and American track and field athlete and Olympics competitor
- Ted Rigg (1913–2002), American basketball player
- Theodore Rigg (1888–1972), British-born New Zealand agricultural chemist and scientific administrator
- Tia Rigg (1998–2010), British murder victim
- Tweedale Rigg (1986–1973), English footballer
- William Rigg (politician) (1847–1926), English-born Canadian businessman and Free Trade politician
- William Rigg (priest) (1877–1966), British Anglican priest

== Places ==
=== Lancashire and Cumbria ===
- Bailrigg, the home of Lancaster University, Lancashire England
- Bigrigg, a village in Cumbria, England
- Drigg, a village in Cumbria on the coast of the Irish Sea
- Eccle Riggs, a country house in Cumbria, England
- Haverigg, a village in Cumbria, England
- High Rigg, a small hill in the English Lake District
- Newton Rigg College, a former agricultural college near Penrith
- Nine Standards Rigg, a summit in the North Pennines near Kirkby Stephen

=== Scotland and Ireland ===
- Rigg, Dumfries and Galloway, a settlement in Dumfries and Galloway, Scotland
- Rigg, County Fermanagh, a townland in County Fermanagh, Northern Ireland

== Fictional characters ==
- Officer Rigg, a character in the Saw film series
- Rigg Sessamekesh, the protagonist of Orson Scott Card's novel Pathfinder

== See also ==
- Hazelrigg (disambiguation)
- Rig (disambiguation)
- Riggs, a surname
- Rigging
- Runrig, Scottish Celtic rock band
