= Rigger =

Rigger may refer to:

- One who attends to the rigging of a sailing ship
- Rigger (entertainment), those who tend rigging in stage performance (theater, film, concert, etc.)
- Rigger, a digital media artist who creates character rigs for animation (also called "rigging" a character)
- Rigger (industry), specializing in moving large/heavy objects such as logs
- Parachute rigger
- Bondage rigger, one who ties up others primarily as an art form
- One who sets up a racing shell in the sport of rowing
- Rigger, Duke Nukem's henchman from the animated series Captain Planet and the Planeteers

== See also ==
- Outrigger, often used in rowing or canoeing
- Rig (disambiguation)
