= Caruthersville Water Tower =

- U.S. National Register of Historic Places
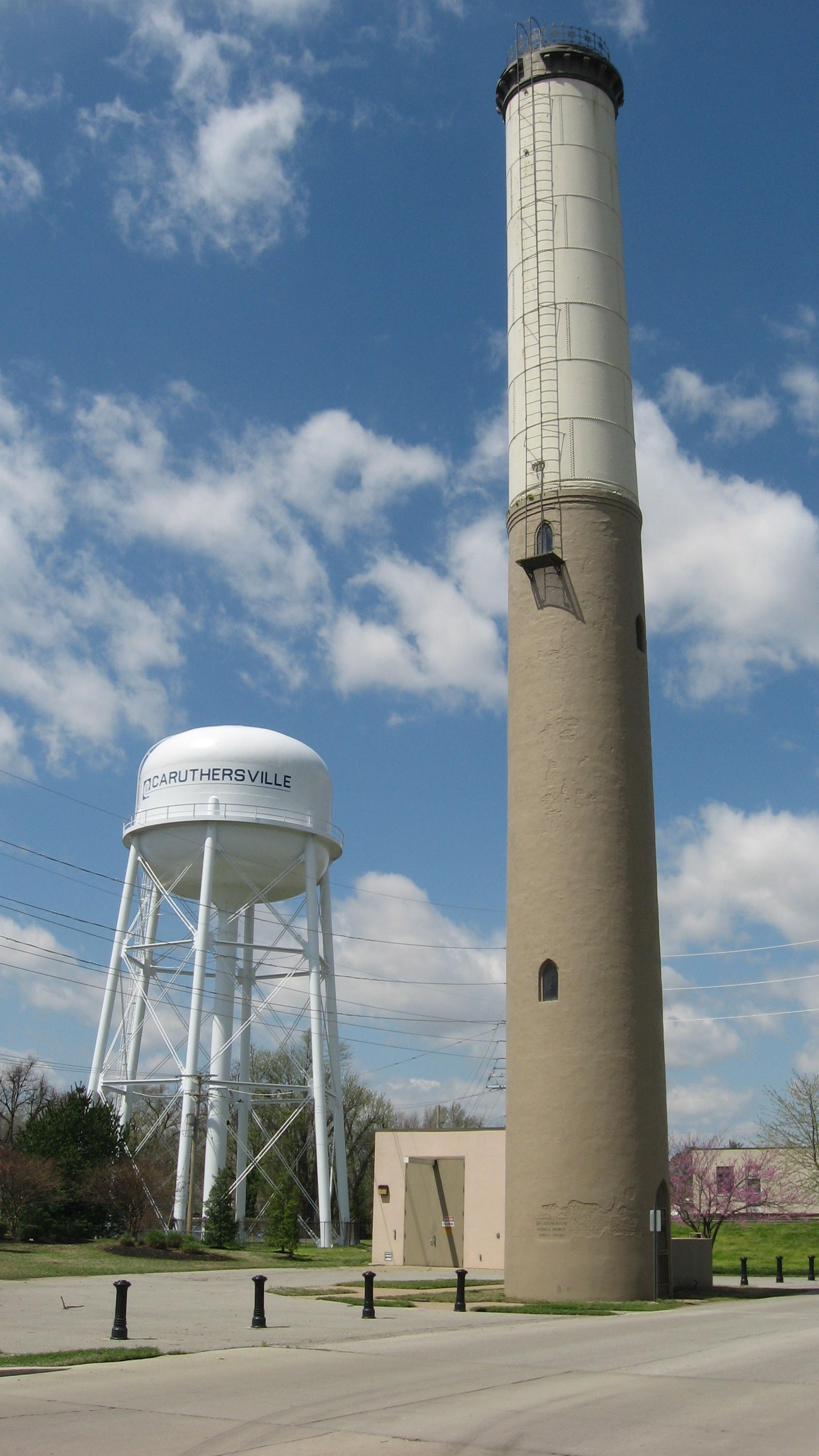
- Caruthersville Water Tower, April 2013

- Location within Missouri Location within the United States
- Location: W. 3rd St., Caruthersville, Missouri
- Coordinates: 36°11′40″N 89°39′30″W
- Area: less than one acre
- Built: 1903
- Built by: Morgan, George C.
- NRHP reference No.: 82003156
- Added to NRHP: September 9, 1982

Caruthersville Water Tower, also known as The Lighthouse, is a historic water tower located at Caruthersville, Pemiscot County, Missouri. It was built in 1903, and is an elevated stand-pipe design stuccoed brick water tower with Gothic style embellishments. The tower supports a steel-plated 40,000 gallon tank. The tower measures 115 feet high, 13 feet in diameter, and 41 feet in circumference.

It was listed on the National Register of Historic Places in 1982.
