= List of mayors of Caruthersville, Missouri =

The city of Caruthersville, Missouri, located in Missouri's 8th congressional district in southeastern Missouri, is the county seat of Pemiscot County, Missouri.

Mayor	Took office	Left office	Additional information
Dr. Bennett Dillon Crowe (1864–1923)			He was born across the Mississippi River in or close to nearby Newbern, Tennessee. In 1892, he entered medical college in connection with the Memphis Hospital and graduated in three years. After practicing medicine for four years in Tennessee, he began a medical practice in Caruthersville. His office was on Ward Street.
Henry Clay Garrett (1840–1921)	c. 1912		He was born in Evansville, Indiana.
William Dyer Byrd, Sr. (1884–1970)	1915	1922	He worked in the insurance business.
William Dyer Byrd, Sr. (1884–1970)	1942	1958	(He previously served as mayor.)
Benjamin Franklin Rogers (1908–1999)	1958	1970	He served in the U.S. Navy during World War II.
William L. Inman (1934–2013)	1970	1974	He later moved to Blytheville, Little Rock, and Heber Springs, Arkansas.
Benjamin Franklin Rogers (1908–1999)	1974	1986	(He previously served as mayor.)
Rickey Lee Davis (1951–2014)	1994	1998	He was killed in a house fire.
Betsy Diane Sayre (1947–2013)	1986	c. 1994	Teacher and certified in school administration
Rickey Lee Davis (1951–2014)	c. 1994	c. 1998	He was killed in a house fire in July 2014. (He previously served as mayor.)
Betsy Diane Sayre (1947–2013)	c. 1998	c. 2009	(She previously served as mayor.)
Rickey Lee Davis (1951–2014)	April 2014	July 2014	He was killed in a house fire in July 2014. (He previously served as mayor.)
Sue Grantham	2014	2015	She was appointed mayor after the previous mayor was killed.
Mike McGraw	2015	2018	
Sue Grantham	2018		(She previously served as mayor.)

== Key ==
Key to party colors and abbreviations for members of the U.S. Congress and other politicians or officials
Alaskan Independence (AKIP) Know Nothing (KN) American Labor (AL) Anti-Jacksonian (Anti-J); National Republican (NR) Anti-Administration (AA) Anti-Masonic (Anti-M) Conservative (Con) Covenant (Cov)	Democratic (D) Democratic–Farmer–Labor (DFL) Democratic–NPL (D-NPL) Dixiecrat (Dix), States' Rights (SR) Democratic-Republican (DR) Farmer–Labor (FL) Federalist (F); Pro-Administration (PA)	Free Soil (FS) Fusion (Fus) Greenback (GB) Independence (IPM) Jacksonian (J) Liberal (Lib) Libertarian (L) National Union (NU)	Nonpartisan League (NPL) Nullifier (N) Opposition Northern (O); Opposition Southern (O) Populist (Pop) Progressive (Prog) Prohibition (Proh) Readjuster (Rea)	Republican (R) Silver (Sv) Silver Republican (SvR) Socialist (Soc) Union (U) Unconditional Union (UU) Vermont Progressive (VP) Whig (W)	Independent (I) Nonpartisan (NP)
