= Margaret Scoggin =

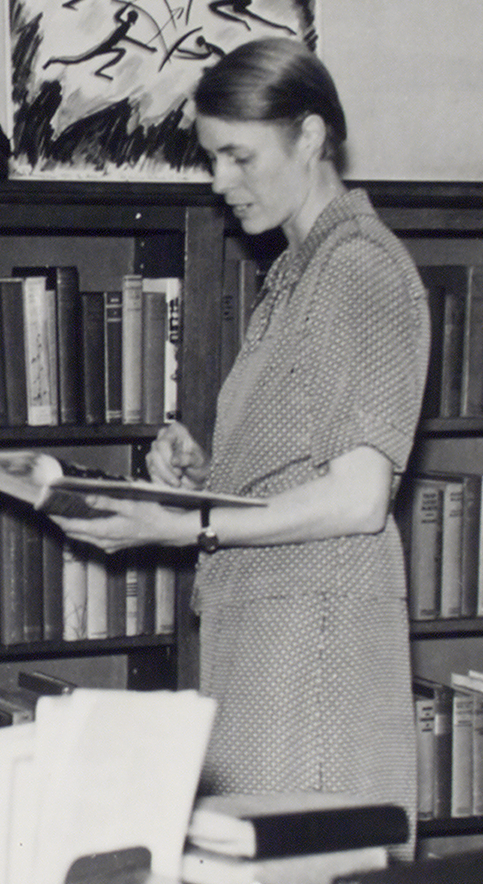
- Born: 14 April 1905; Caruthersville, Columbia
- Died: 11 July 1968 (aged 63); New York City
- Occupation: Librarian, writer, radio personality
- Employer: New York Public Library

Margaret Clara Scoggin (April 14, 1905 – July 11, 1968) was one of the first librarians to expand dramatically upon the idea of young adult public librarianship. Scoggin implemented several programs throughout her career at the New York Public Library that placed intense importance on young adult readers, which ultimately inspired the ever-improving teen librarianship seen today. She said of young adults, "They are a vital force which the library can both develop and use. They are the voters of tomorrow, the potential adult users and supporters of the public library, the emergent community to whom, theoretically, the public library belongs." In 1999, American Libraries named her one of the "100 Most Important Leaders We Had in the 20th Century".

== Education and early career ==
Scoggin was born in Caruthersville, Missouri to Alfred Polk and Margaret Ellen Bright Scoggin.

In 1926, Margaret Scoggin graduated from Radcliffe College and shortly after took a summer job at the New York Public Library. Her hard work and growing devotion to librarianship, as well as her emergent friendship with superintendent of Work with Schools Mabel Williams, gave her the opportunity to quickly move up and garner more responsibility. By 1928, Scoggin was already presenting a paper at an American Library Association conference, and by 1929 had begun attending class at the School of Librarianship at the University of London. Upon graduation, she took a job as school and reference librarian at the George Bruce Branch of the New York Public Library and simultaneously taught at the Library's training school until it transferred to Columbia University in 1932.

From 1938 to 1941, Scoggin began working toward her master's degree at Columbia University's School of Library Science, but never completed her final work for the degree. Instead, encouraged by mentor Mabel Williams, she became the director of the New York Public Library's Nathan Straus Branch for Children and Young People in 1940, and continued to work as superintendent of Work with Young People from 1952 until retirement.

== Nathan Straus Branch For Children and Young People ==
The Nathan Straus Branch For Children and Young People was created in 1940 with the assistance of Nathan Straus, the New York Public Library, and Margaret Scoggin. It was a colorful and welcoming building that encouraged young adults to feel comfortable at their library. Scoggin's 1941 article, "The Library as a Center for Young People in the Community" reveals much about the philosophy that was the driving force behind the building's appearance and the branch's purpose. The article is rife with insistence that the teenagers, whom Scoggin defines at people 13–21 years of age, should absolutely always have a say in how their library is run. She says, "…let there be wide realization that the public library’s key to young people’s service, and therefore to reading guidance, is the opportunity to prove that books are fun, reading a pleasure, and that the places where books and people meet are centers of activity and sociability."

Sociability was a factor that Scoggin wrote about with fervor and acted upon throughout her entire career. Circulatin' the News was a bulletin of book reviews written by the Nathan Straus Reviewers, a group of teenagers headed by Scoggin. She says of this program, "Circulatin' the News has shown that young people under twenty-one have pertinent comments to make about books; often they are surprisingly shrewd in their detection of falsity and weakness. Such an outlet gives the young people an opportunity to express their opinions, under no compulsion, and starts them on the road to critical judgment." The article is peppered with pleas such as this, to give young adults a voice in how their library is run, and to head up social groups so their voice can be heard. She hoped to use this information (the opinions of the teens themselves) to influence the kinds of books provided in the library and how they were organized within the building itself. Circulatin' the News was such a success that it moved to radio format after Scoggin appeared on a New York City program entitled This is Our Town. The show, composed of book reviews by teen panelists, ran for 22 years until it changed its name to "Teen-Age Book Talk," and eventually moved to television in 1960. Due to the successes of Scoggin's branch, it went on to become an example for teen libraries around the world. Her influence is evidenced in the teen sections of libraries today, with their colorful atmospheres and adherence to the tastes of young people.

== ALA and other publications ==
Margaret Scoggin maintained a close relationship with the American Library Association (ALA) throughout her entire career. In 1942 she was named an ALA councilor, and in 1949 she was sent by ALA and the Rockefeller Foundation to assist in the International Youth Library in Munich. In 1957 she served as the first President for ALA's Young Adult Services Division, now known as the Young Adult Library Services Association. Her work there was lauded by the Children's Book Council, who eventually set up the Margaret Scoggin Memorial Collection which exists there today.

Outside of her direct work with libraries, Scoggin was a prolific editor of young adult collections and writer of critical articles. In collections such as Chucklebait, one of her most famous works, she collected comedic stories for young people.
