= Caruthersville, Missouri =

- City
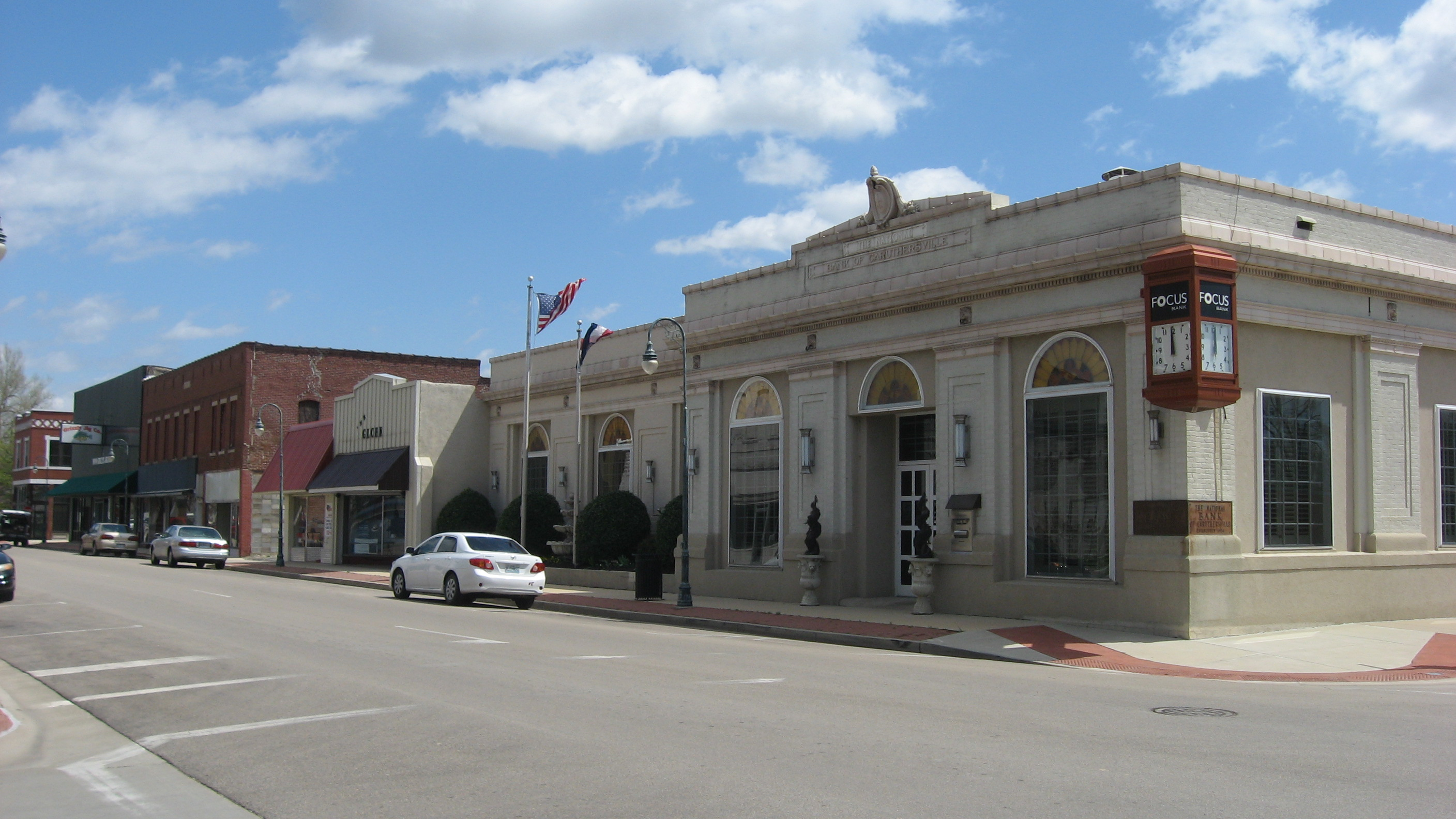
- Ward Avenue downtown

- Location within Pemiscot County and Missouri
- Coordinates: 36°10′53″N 89°39′59″W
- Country: United States
- State: Missouri
- County: Pemiscot
- Incorporated: May 18, 1874
- Named for: Samuel Caruthers (U.S. Congressman)

Government
  - Mayor: Sue Grantham (2023)

Area
  - Total: 5.24 sq mi (13.56 km^{2})
  - Land: 5.16 sq mi (13.36 km^{2})
  - Water: 0.077 sq mi (0.20 km^{2})
- Elevation: 269 ft (82 m)

Population (2020)
  - Total: 5,562
  - Density: 1,078.4/sq mi (416.37/km^{2})
- Time zone: UTC-6 (Central (CST))
  - Summer (DST): UTC-5 (CDT)
- ZIP code: 63830
- Area code: 573
- FIPS code: 29-11692
- GNIS feature ID: 2393761
- Website: www.caruthersvillecity.com

Caruthersville (/kəˈrʌðərzvɪl/ kə-RUDH-ərz-vil) is a city and the county seat of Pemiscot County, Missouri, United States, located along the Mississippi River in the Bootheel region of the state's far southeast. The population was 5,562, according to the 2020 census.

== History ==
Caruthersville lies in Missouri's Bootheel on the Mississippi River. The word "Pemiscot" comes from the word pemiskaw, meaning "liquid mud" in the Fox language. Mississippi waters have frequently flooded the flatlands, creating fertile alluvial land valued for farming. Settling the floodplain has resulted in periodic problems for residents, as there are regular floods despite (and because of) elaborate constructed systems of levees and flood controls.

Native Americans inhabited the land of the Caruthersville area for thousands of years before European settlement. The Mississippian culture built huge earthwork mounds throughout the Mississippi Valley. One such earthwork remains in this county, rising 270 feet above sea level about four miles southwest of Caruthersville. It stands in contrast to the surrounding delta-like plain.

In 1857 John Hardeman Walker and G. W. Bushey laid out and platted the town of Caruthersville. The town was named for Samuel Caruthers, who first represented the area in the US Congress.

The City of Caruthersville was incorporated on May 18, 1874. The first few decades of the town's growth can be documented through Sanborn maps, which recorded building ownership, materials, and use.

In 1893, Missouri's General Assembly created the Saint Francis Levee District to construct protection for that part of the Saint Francis River basin lying within the counties of Dunklin, New Madrid, and Pemiscot. This act authorized taxes for the purpose of building, repairing, protecting, and maintaining levees in the district.

=== 20th century to present ===
White violence against African Americans increased in the late 19th and early 20th centuries as they were pushing them out of the political system and voting across the South. Whites lynched four men in Caruthersville: D. Malone and W.J. Mooneyhon on May 3, 1903; and A.B. Richardson and Benjamin Woods on October 11, 1911.

Steel cages are one of the oldest forms of enclosures used in professional wrestling. The earliest known "steel cage matches" of any kind took place on January 9, 1936 in Caruthersville, Missouri, in a card that included two such "chicken wire fence" matches between Lon Chaney and Otto Ludwig and Joe Dillman vs. Charles Sinkey. These matches took place in a ring surrounded by chicken wire in order to keep the athletes inside and prevent any potential interference.

In February 1969, construction began on a bridge across the Mississippi at Caruthersville. Completed in 1976 and connecting with Dyersburg, Tennessee, it is the only bridge to cross the Mississippi River between Cairo, Illinois and Memphis, Tennessee. It is a single-tower cantilever bridge carrying Interstate 155 and U.S. Route 412.

During the night of April 2, 2006, 60% of Caruthersville was severely damaged or destroyed by a string of tornadoes that passed through the Midwestern United States. At least two persons were confirmed killed in Pemiscot County as a result of the tornado. On Monday morning, local police, state troopers, and the National Guard had barred entrance into Caruthersville and issued it as a "no fly zone" to anyone who was not a resident, an emergency worker, or a member of the newsmedia. According to the emergency management director from a nearby county, as many as 1,500 people were displaced by the storm, which struck the southwest side of the city.

As reported by Caruthersville's then-mayor, Diane Sayre, there were no confirmed fatalities within city limits, but electricity and water services were disabled. Several churches, landmarks, and schools were destroyed or severely damaged, including St. John's Episcopal, Jesus Name Tabernacle, Faith Missionary Baptist, Caruthersville Municipal Airport, Caruthersville Cotton Warehouse, the Boy's and Girl's Club of the Bootheel, Knox's Drive In, the Kwik Chek, Caruthersville High School, and Caruthersville Middle School.

== Geography ==
The city is located in the state's Bootheel, along the western bank of the Mississippi River and within the seismically active New Madrid Seismic Zone. The Caruthersville Bridge is the only bridge crossing the river between Cairo, Illinois and Memphis, Tennessee.

According to the United States Census Bureau, the city has a total area of 5.24 square miles (13.57 km^{2}), of which 5.16 square miles (13.36 km^{2}) is land and 0.08 square miles (0.21 km^{2}) is water.

=== Climate ===
The climate in this area is characterized by hot, humid summers and generally mild to cool winters. According to the Köppen Climate Classification system, Caruthersville has a humid subtropical climate, abbreviated "Cfa" on climate maps.

Climate data for Caruthersville, Missouri (1991–2020 normals, extremes 1898–2012)
Month	Jan	Feb	Mar	Apr	May	Jun	Jul	Aug	Sep	Oct	Nov	Dec	Year
Record high °F (°C)	79 (26)	83 (28)	93 (34)	97 (36)	102 (39)	109 (43)	109 (43)	111 (44)	108 (42)	98 (37)	87 (31)	79 (26)	111 (44)
Mean daily maximum °F (°C)	46.1 (7.8)	51.1 (10.6)	59.9 (15.5)	70.8 (21.6)	79.1 (26.2)	87.5 (30.8)	90.1 (32.3)	88.9 (31.6)	83.0 (28.3)	72.4 (22.4)	59.4 (15.2)	49.0 (9.4)	69.8 (21.0)
Daily mean °F (°C)	37.9 (3.3)	41.9 (5.5)	49.9 (9.9)	60.4 (15.8)	69.7 (20.9)	77.9 (25.5)	81.1 (27.3)	79.6 (26.4)	72.8 (22.7)	61.5 (16.4)	49.8 (9.9)	40.9 (4.9)	60.3 (15.7)
Mean daily minimum °F (°C)	29.6 (−1.3)	32.7 (0.4)	39.8 (4.3)	50.0 (10.0)	60.4 (15.8)	68.4 (20.2)	72.2 (22.3)	70.2 (21.2)	62.7 (17.1)	50.6 (10.3)	40.1 (4.5)	32.8 (0.4)	50.8 (10.4)
Record low °F (°C)	−15 (−26)	−22 (−30)	5 (−15)	26 (−3)	33 (1)	45 (7)	54 (12)	48 (9)	32 (0)	20 (−7)	5 (−15)	−9 (−23)	−22 (−30)
Average precipitation inches (mm)	4.00 (102)	4.87 (124)	5.25 (133)	6.12 (155)	5.91 (150)	4.38 (111)	3.78 (96)	3.14 (80)	3.59 (91)	4.60 (117)	4.39 (112)	5.23 (133)	55.26 (1,404)
Average precipitation days (≥ 0.01 in)	10.5	8.2	10.3	10.7	10.0	9.2	7.6	5.6	7.1	6.8	9.9	10.2	106.1
Source: NOAA

== Demographics ==
Historical population
Census	Pop.	Note	%±
1890	230		—
1900	2,315		906.5%
1910	3,655		57.9%
1920	4,750		30.0%
1930	4,781		0.7%
1940	6,612		38.3%
1950	8,614		30.3%
1960	8,643		0.3%
1970	7,350		−15.0%
1980	7,958		8.3%
1990	7,389		−7.2%
2000	6,760		−8.5%
2010	6,168		−8.8%
2020	5,562		−9.8%
U.S. Decennial Census

=== 2020 census ===
As of the 2020 census, Caruthersville had a population of 5,562. The median age was 35.8 years. 27.8% of residents were under the age of 18 and 16.5% of residents were 65 years of age or older. For every 100 females there were 90.9 males, and for every 100 females age 18 and over there were 88.1 males age 18 and over.

95.6% of residents lived in urban areas, while 4.4% lived in rural areas.

There were 2,260 households in Caruthersville, of which 32.5% had children under the age of 18 living in them. Of all households, 28.5% were married-couple households, 22.2% were households with a male householder and no spouse or partner present, and 41.0% were households with a female householder and no spouse or partner present. About 34.6% of all households were made up of individuals and 15.0% had someone living alone who was 65 years of age or older.

There were 2,663 housing units, of which 15.1% were vacant. The homeowner vacancy rate was 4.9% and the rental vacancy rate was 10.3%.

Racial composition as of the 2020 census
Race	Number	Percent
White	3,199	57.5%
Black or African American	1,930	34.7%
American Indian and Alaska Native	7	0.1%
Asian	18	0.3%
Native Hawaiian and Other Pacific Islander	1	0.0%
Some other race	93	1.7%
Two or more races	314	5.6%
Hispanic or Latino (of any race)	149	2.7%

=== 2010 census ===
At the 2010 census, there were 6,168 people, 2,454 households and 1,567 families living in the city. The population density was 1,195.3 per square mile (461.5/km^{2}). There were 2,727 housing units at an average density of 528.5 per square mile (204.1/km^{2}). The racial makeup was 63.89% White, 33.09% Black or African American, 0.28% Native American, 0.19% Asian, 0.11% Native Hawaiian or Pacific Islander, 0.76% from other races, and 1.67% from two or more races. Hispanic or Latino of any race were 2.35% of the population.

There were 2,454 households, of which 31.6% had children under the age of 18 living with them, 35.3% were married couples living together, 22.9% had a female householder with no husband present, 5.6% had a male householder with no wife present, and 36.1% were non-families. 31.5% of all households were made up of individuals, and 12.7% had someone living alone who was 65 years of age or older. The average household size was 2.47 and the average family size was 3.10.

The median age was 34.2 years. 29.5% of residents were under the age of 18; 9.1% were between the ages of 18 and 24; 23.4% were from 25 to 44; 23.9% were from 45 to 64; and 14.1% were 65 years of age or older. The gender makeup was 46.6% male and 53.4% female.

=== 2000 census ===
At the 2000 census, there were 6,760 people, 2,643 households and 1,723 families living in the city. The population density was 1,290.8 per square mile (498.1 per km^{2}). There were 2,999 housing units at an average density of 572.7 per square mile (221.0 per km^{2}). The racial makeup was 66.08% White, 31.41% African American, 0.13% Native American, 0.53% Asian, 0.03% Pacific Islander, 0.70% from other races, and 1.12% from two or more races. Hispanic or Latino of any race were 1.66% of the population.

There were 2,643 households, of which 35.8% had children under the age of 18 living with them, 40.0% were married couples living together, 21.2% had a female householder with no husband present, and 34.8% were non-families. 30.8% of all households were made up of individuals, and 14.7% had someone living alone who was 65 years of age or older. The average household size was 2.53 and the average family size was 3.17.

32.8% of the population were under the age of 18, 9.6% from 18 to 24, 24.7% from 25 to 44, 19.3% from 45 to 64, and 13.6% who were 65 years of age or older. The median age was 31 years. For every 100 females, there were 86.3 males. For every 100 females age 18 and over, there were 79.8 males.

The median household income was $19,601 and the median family income was $23,454. Males had a median income of $25,821 and females $17,434. The per capita income was $12,034. About 28.1% of families and 35.7% of the population were below the poverty line, including 50.3% of those under age 18 and 23.4% of those age 65 or over.

== Education ==
The majority of the municipality is in the Caruthersville 18 School District. Caruthersville 18 School District operates one elementary school, one middle school, and Caruthersville High School.

A portion of the municipality extends into the Pemiscot County R-III School District.

The town has a lending library, the Caruthersville Public Library.

Three Rivers College's service area includes Pemiscot County.

== Government ==
- List of Caruthersville mayors

== Economy ==
Major resources for the Caruthersville area include commerce supplied by the Mississippi river barge and transport industry as well as agriculture which accounts for 60% of the local economy. Large portions of the cash crops grown in the area, rice, soybeans and cotton are sent through the Mississippi River transportation industry to distribution points along the Mississippi delta region. There is now a riverboat casino in Caruthersville which has revived the local economy and provided a new source of tourist revenue.

== Architecture ==
The city of Caruthersville has the historic Caruthersville Water Tower which was built between 1902 and 1903. It is one of three in the nation with the appearance of a lighthouse with the other two located in Indiana and Louisiana. This one is on the National Register of Historic Places.

== Notable people ==
- Eddie Acuff, actor, stage and screen
- John B. England, World War II fighter ace
- Donna Hightower, singer and songwriter
- Cedric the Entertainer, actor and comedian
- Wendell Mayes, screenwriter and playwright
- James Oliver, zoologist and herpetologist
- Clarke Reed, businessman
- John M. Riggs, U.S. Army general
- Margaret Scoggin, librarian
- Reggie Young, musician
