= Hazelrigg =

Hazlerigg may refer to:

== Places ==
- Hazlerigg, a village in Tyne & Wear
- Hazelrigg, Cumbria, England
- Hazelrigg, Lancashire, England
- Hazelrigg House, Northampton. A grade II listed building
- Hazelrigg, Indiana, United States

== People ==
- Clara H. Hazelrigg (1859–1937), American author, educator, social reformer
- Lawrence E. Hazelrigg, American academic - usually quoted by surname only
- Baron Hazlerigg, A title in the Peerage of the United Kingdom
- Arthur Haselrig, a 17th century English parliamentarian
- Tulle Hazelrigg, American biologist
