= Big Rig (disambiguation) =

A big rig or semi-trailer truck is an articulated vehicle that consists of a towing engine.

It may also refer to:

- Big Rigs: Over the Road Racing, a 2003 video game
- Big Rig (film), a 2008 documentary film
- Big Rig (band), a band
- Ron "Big Rig" Michaels, a disc jockey at WXTB in Tampa
- Pat "Big Rig" Maroon, Professional hockey player and three time Stanley Cup Champion

== See also ==
- Bigrigg, a village in Cumbria, England
- Johny Hendricks, American mixed martial artist known as Bigg Rigg
