= Lifting beam =

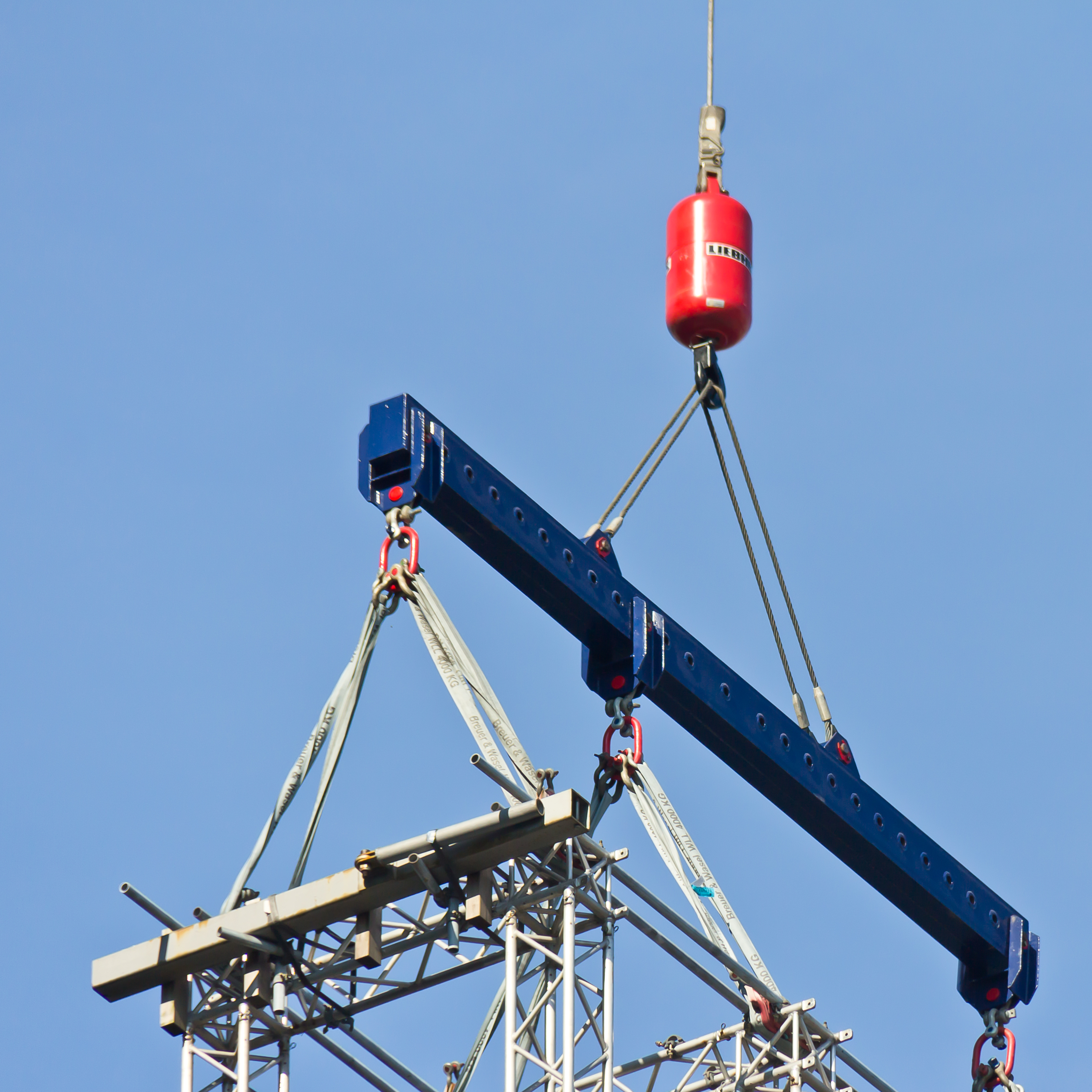
Rigging of an asymmetrical scaffolding piece: the lifting beam is blue, the load is attached to the beam using grey slings

The lifting beam (also known as traverse, spreader beam) is a steel beam that is attached to the hook of the crane in order to spread the slings from one end of an elongated load (like a wall panel) to another. The bottom of the beam has multiple connection points for hanging the load.

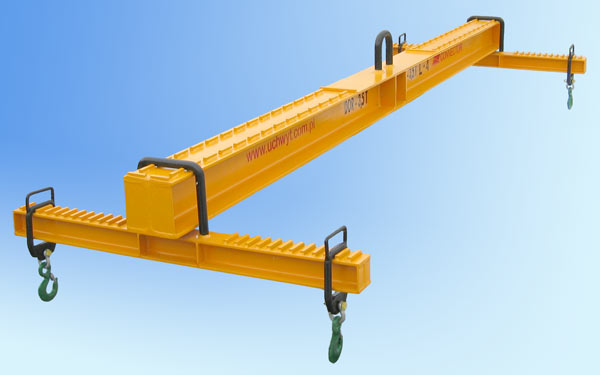
H-shaped traverse

The lifting beams are used in multiple cases:

- lifting an asymmetrical load. Without a beam, it might be hard to strap the load so that its center of gravity is exactly below the hook;
- handling a long load with a single-hook crane. Sufficient spread between the slings prevents the load from slipping out;
- increase the headroom: slings cannot be stretched close to the horizontal direction, so attaching them directly to the hook requires a minimum distance from the hook to the load. When the lifting beam is used, the slings can be shorter, providing more vertical clearance during lifting;
- if the attachments of the load are on its vertical sides, the slings have to go over the edges of the load, which can damage these edges. A lifting beam allows attaching slings to the side lugs without touching the edges;
- the top of the beam can have two attachment points at the ends thus allowing two cranes to share the load.

== See also ==
- Container spreader

== Sources ==
- Gorse, C.; Johnston, D.; Pritchard, M. (2012). A Dictionary of Construction, Surveying, and Civil Engineering. Oxford Paperback Reference. OUP Oxford. ISBN 978-0-19-953446-3.
- Kulweic, R.A. (1991). "Lifting beam". Materials Handling Handbook. A Wiley-Interscience publication. Wiley. pp. 525–526. ISBN 978-0-471-09782-2.
- Zhu, Changbiao; Miao, Wenfeng; Xu, Kun; Mei, Xiao; Li, Changbin (2024). "Lifting Attachments of Cranes". Handbook of Port Machinery. Singapore: Springer. pp. 745–844. doi:10.1007/978-981-99-4848-2_8. ISBN 978-981-99-4848-2.
