= Rigger (industry) =

Worker in lifting, landing and assembly of large or heavy objects

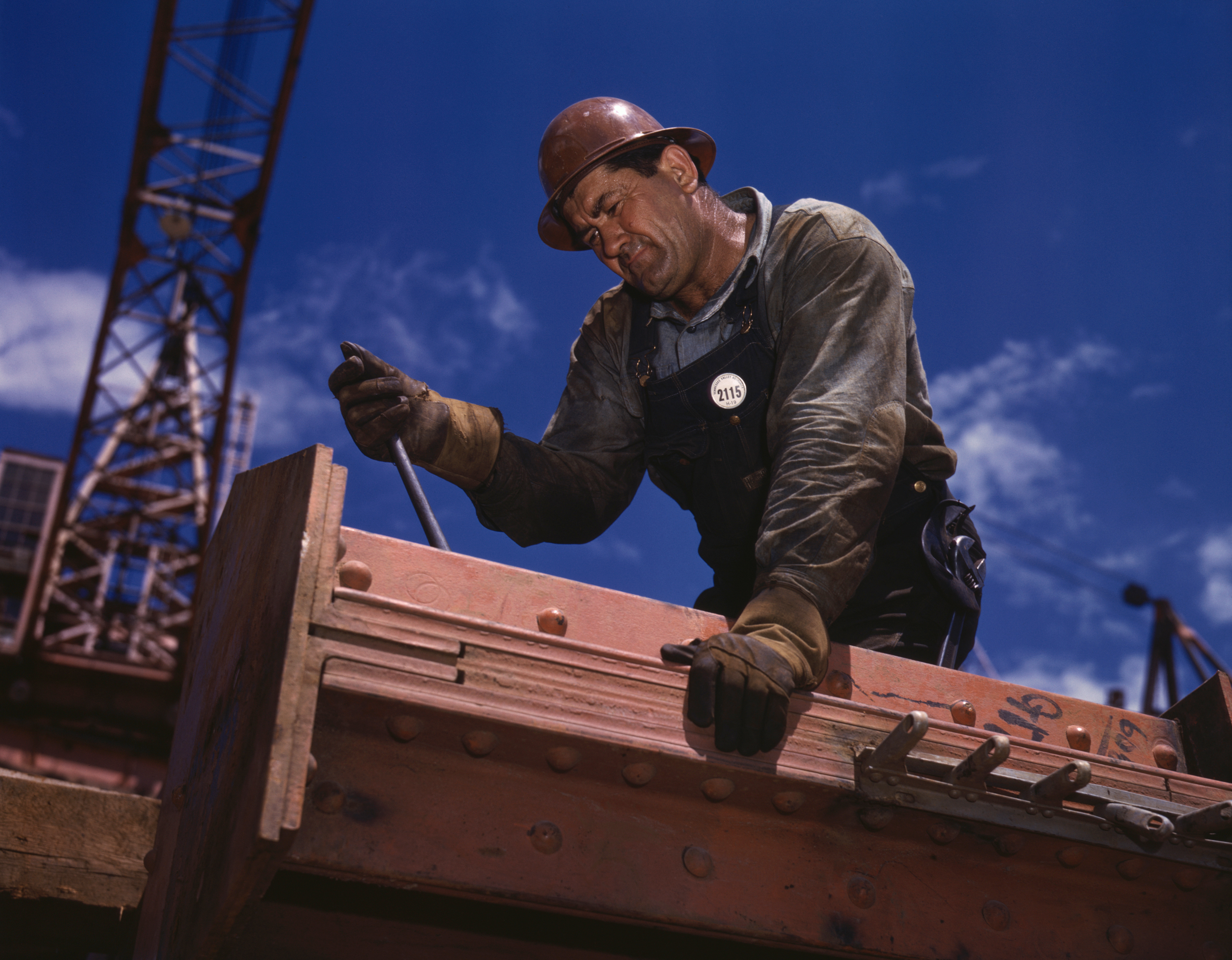
A rigger at work on Douglas Dam, Tennessee, June 1942

A rigger or slinger is a skilled tradesperson who specializes in the assistance of manual mechanical advantage device comprising pulley, block and tackle or motorised such as a crane or derrick or chain hoists (chain fall) or capstan winch.

== Etymology ==
The term comes from the days of sailing ships, when a rigger was a person who worked with rigging, that is, ropes for hoisting the sails. Sailors could put their rope skills to work in lifting and hauling. In an era before mechanical haulage and cranes, ropes, pulleys and muscle power were all that was available to move heavy objects. A specialized subset are telecommunication riggers, entertainment industry riggers. In time, rigging became a trade in itself, giving rise to modern usages with some original terminology remaining, with its roots all but forgotten.

== Description ==
Riggers attach loads of equipment to cranes or structures using shackles, cables, chains, clamps or straps, employing pulleys, winches, lifts or chain hoists (aka chain motors). Quick load calculations are necessary for each load and engineering principles are always in play. Riggers use various suspension techniques to get their load around obstacles on a construction site or loading dock or event site to the desired location and height.

== See also ==
- World's Toughest Fixes, an American reality-TV series with a focus on industrial rigging
