= Sheila M. Riggs =

Personal details
- Education: Harvard University (DMSc), University of Iowa College of Dentistry (DDS), Creighton University

Sheila M. Riggs serves as chair of the Department of Primary Dental Care at the University of Minnesota School of Dentistry as well as the community engagement director for the University's Clinical and Translational Science Institute. In these roles, she pursues a wide range of research interests as well as providing leadership to the pioneering Dental Therapy Program within her department. The Dental Therapist program in Minnesota is among the first to be developed and accredited in the US and is designed to increase access to dental care for underserved populations.

While pursuing her doctorate in medical sciences from Harvard in the late 1980s, she worked to expand access by influencing insurance carriers and legislative leaders and shifted away from a clinical career providing care one patient at a time. She began her career serving both as an Assistant Professor in Harvard School of Dental Medicine's Department of Oral Epidemiology and Health Policy, and as President of the Iowa Health Research Institute. She joined the executive ranks of Wellmark Blue Cross Blue Shield of Iowa and South Dakota to launch and lead their analytics division, later adding the role of Executive Director of The Wellmark Foundation to her responsibilities.

In 1999, Riggs was recruited to the board of directors of Delta Dental of Minnesota to launch an analytics strategy. That work was recognized by the board as successful and led to her appointment as CEO of Delta Dental in 2005 where she served until the firm's operations were acquired in 2008.

Riggs is vice chair of the board of directors of Hennepin Healthcare System dba HCMC, where she chairs the Physicians Compensation and Benefits Committee. She also serves on the board of Benco Dental, Inc., chairing the Growth and Diversification Committee as well as The Wellmark Foundation.

== Publications ==
- Jiang, Peilei; Bargman, Eric P.; Garrett, Nancy A.; DeVries, Andrea; Springman, Steve; Riggs, Sheila (September 2008). "A Comparison of Dental Service Use Among Commercially Insured Women in Minnesota Before, During and After Pregnancy". The Journal of the American Dental Association. 139 (9). Elsevier Inc.: 1173–1180. doi:10.14219/jada.archive.2008.0332. PMID 18762627. (subscription required)
- Blue, Christine M.; Funkhouser, D. Ellen; Riggs, Sheila; Rindal, D. Brad; Worley, Donald; Pihlstrom, Daniel J.; Benjamin, Paul; Gilbert, Gregg H.; the National Dental PBRN Collaborative Group (May 14, 2013). "Utilization of nondentist providers and attitudes toward new provider models: findings from the National Dental Practice-Based Research Network". Journal of Public Health Dentistry. 73 (3). American Association of Public Health Dentistry: 237–244. doi:10.1111/jphd.12020. PMC 4127301. PMID 23668892. (subscription required)
