= Rig, Jask =

Rig ريگ
- Village
- Location within Iran
- Coordinates: 25°46′48″N 57°41′34″E
- Country: Iran
- Province: Hormozgan
- County: Jask
- Bakhsh: Central
- Rural District: Jask

Population (2006)
  - Total: 36
- Time zone: UTC+3:30 (IRST)
  - Summer (DST): UTC+4:30 (IRDT)

Rig (Persian: ريگ, also Romanized as Rīg; also known as Rīg-e Naşrī) is a village in Jask Rural District, in the Central District of Jask County, Hormozgan Province, Iran. At the 2006 census, its population was 36, in 7 families.
