= Riggs' disease =

Historical term for gum disease

Riggs' disease, also known as pyorrhea of a toothsocket or gingivitis expulsiva, is a historical term for periodontitis (gum disease), The condition was described as a purulent inflammation of the dental periosteum. It was named after American dentist John Mankey Riggs (1811–1885).

Riggs' disease was said to produce the progressive necrosis of the alveoli and looseness of the teeth. The teeth may become very loose and fall out of the sockets.

Mark Twain wrote briefly about Riggs' disease in his short essay, "Happy Memories of the Dental Chair", in which he claims to have been examined by Dr. Riggs himself.
