= Boat rigging =

Setting up a rowing boat to accommodate the crew for rowing

Boats used in the sport of rowing may be adjusted in many different ways according to the needs of the crew, the type of racing, and anticipated rowing conditions. The primary objective of rigging a boat is to accommodate the different physiques and styles of rowing of the crew in such a way that the oars move in similar arcs through the water, thus improving the crew's efficiency and cohesiveness.

Together, the various adjustments are known as the 'rig' of the boat. Within a multi-rower crew, such as an eight, different oarsmen will make small adjustments to their own position, though most settings are usually uniform throughout the crew.

The order of the outriggers on the boat can also be altered so that rowers on different sides can row in different positions in the boat. This is covered in the article on Boat positions.

== Gearing ==
The oar acts as a lever, pivoting around the gate, which acts as a fulcrum. The oar's button sets the leverage ratio between the inboard and outboard portions of the oar and therefore sets the gearing.

Moving the button towards the handle reduces the inboard and increases the outboard, making each stroke harder but more effective. Such a gearing might be used for sprint racing.

The distance of the gate from the boat's centerline is usually adjustable by 3 to 4 cm (2 to 2.5 inches).

The gearing is usually set the same for all rowers in a crew, though a particularly tall or strong oarsman may have a different gearing to accommodate them.

The gear ratio is calculated slightly differently for sculling and sweep boats.

Sculling:

$G = \frac{2(OA-IB)}{S}$

Sweep:

$G = \frac{(OA-IB)}{S}$

where $OA$ is the overall oar length, $IB$ is the inboard length, and $S$ is the spread

The reason for two formulas is that spread is typically measured as the distance between port and starboard pins in a sculling boat and the distance between the keel and the pin for a sweep boat. Common gear ratios for sculling are between 2.4 and 2.6; for sweep common gear ratios are between 3.0 and 3.2.

== Height ==
The height of the gate can be adjusted, usually by moving washers on the pin from below it to above it, or vice versa. This may be required if the boat is sitting particularly low or high in the water, due to the crew's weight. If the crew anticipates rough water the boat may be rigged higher to allow more clearance of the blade above the water on the recovery.

The height of the gate is usually measured from the lowest point on the top of the seat.

== Transverse Pitch ==
The gate can be rotated so that the blade is presented to the water at a slight angle, usually so that the top of the blade is further towards the stern than the bottom while it is in the water. This makes it easier to keep the blade at the right height during the stroke and to extract it at the end. Usually 3 to 5 degrees of transverse pitch is used, and when rowers talk of 'pitch' they are referring to transverse pitch.

Transverse pitch may be achieved by rotating the pin on which the gate pivots, or by adding shaped wedges into the back of the gate for the oar to rest on.

Transverse pitch is usually set the same for all members of a crew. If the rowers on one side had a different transverse pitch than the other it would tend to unbalance the boat.

In the UK it is called Stern pitch.

== Lateral Pitch ==
Lateral pitch is the angle by which the pin leans away from the boat, with the top of the pin further from the boat's centreline than the bottom. Lateral pitch typically ranges from 0 to 2 degrees.

The effect of lateral pitch is to give more transverse pitch at the start of the stroke, and less at the finish, and may make the rower feel that the oar stays at the right height in the water more easily.

== Footstretcher ==
The footstretcher is where the rower's feet are attached to the boat, and has a pair of shoes or simple clogs attached to it. Adjustments of the footstretcher are usually made on the basis of the individual rower's physique.

=== Rake (angle) ===
The footstretcher can sometimes be adjusted for the angle to the horizontal, allowing for more or less flexibility in the rower's ankles.

In most boats set at 45 degrees angle relative to the keel / waterline. Although, 42 degrees is ideal.
. - Flatter for inflexible ankles: too much reduces effectiveness of the leg push and increases the likelihood of over-reaching
- Steeper for more flexible ankles and can be used to prevent over-reaching: too much will increase the likelihood of achilles injuries

=== Height ===
Changing the height of the feet changes how easy it is for the rower to reach forward and the amount of power they can comfortably apply. Lowering the feet allows a greater body angle at the catch, while raising the feet reduces the moment arm between the handle and the force at the feet, allowing greater force application for the same core/postural muscle strength.

=== Position ===
The footstretcher can also move bow-wards or sternwards, usually to accommodate the length of the rower's legs. Typically a coach will start rigging the boat on the basis of all of the crew achieving the same position at the finish of the stroke, by adjusting the positions of the footstretchers.

== The Slide ==
The slide (the runners on which the seat rolls) can usually be adjusted fore and aft so that the rower can use full reach. If the coach considers that a rower is over-reaching at the catch, he may adjust the slide so that the rower hits the end of the slide ('frontstops') when the legs are compressed to the correct angle, preventing over-compression.

== See also ==
- Rowing (sport)
- Boat positions (sport rowing)
