= Container spreader =

Tool for lifting containers and unitized cargo

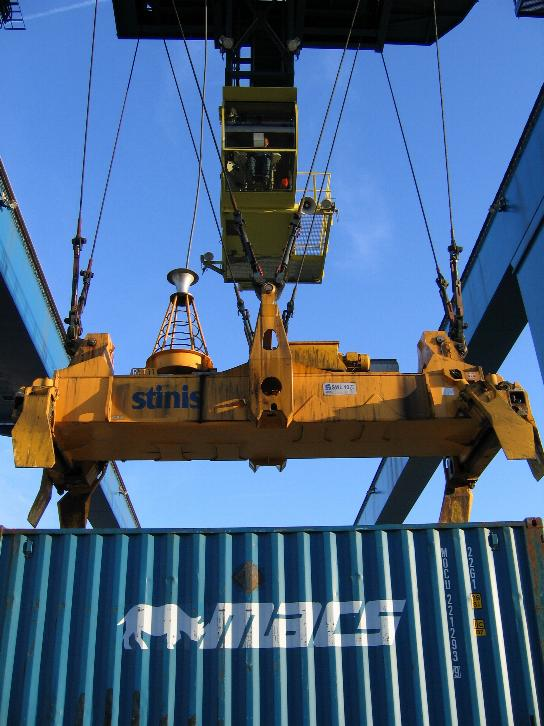

A container spreader is a tool used for lifting containers and unitized cargo. The spreader is placed between the container and the lifting machine.

The spreader used for containers has a locking mechanism at each corner that attaches to the four corners of the container. A spreader can be used on a container crane, a straddle carrier and with any other machinery to lift containers. Spreader operation can be manual, semiautomatic or fully automatic.

== See also ==
- Spreader beam

== Sources ==
- Zhu, Changbiao; Miao, Wenfeng; Xu, Kun; Mei, Xiao; Li, Changbin (2024). "Lifting Attachments of Cranes". Handbook of Port Machinery. Singapore: Springer. pp. 745–844. doi:10.1007/978-981-99-4848-2_8. ISBN 978-981-99-4848-2.
