= Straddle carrier =

Freight-carrying vehicle

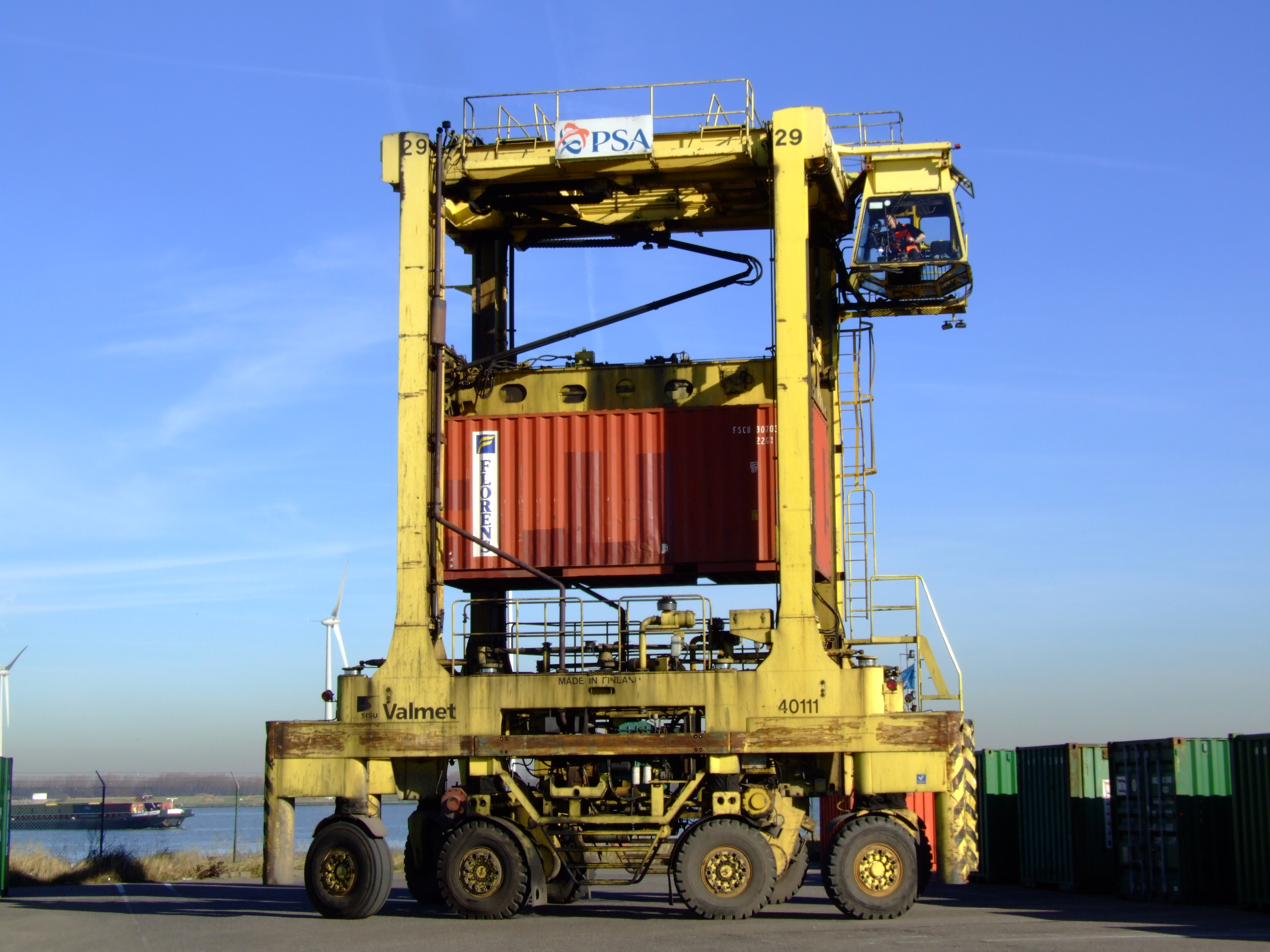
Straddle carrier

A straddle carrier or straddle truck is a freight-carrying vehicle that carries its load underneath by "straddling" it, rather than carrying it on top like a conventional truck. The advantage of the straddle carrier is its ability to load and unload without the assistance of cranes or forklifts. The lifting apparatus under the carrier is operated by the driver without any outside assistance and without leaving the driver's seat.

== Lumber carriers ==
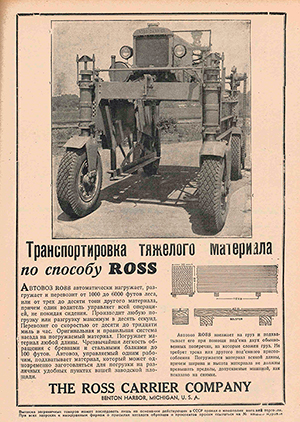
1934 Ross Carrier advertising

The straddle carrier was invented by H. B. Ross in 1913 as a road-going vehicle that could easily transport lumber around mills and yards. Lumber was stacked on special pallets known as carrier blocks; the carrier would then straddle the stack, grasp and lift the carrier block, and drive off with the load. Because a straddle carrier is open at both front and rear, it can transport lumber much longer than the carrier itself, over 30 m (98 ft) in length.

The Ross Carrier Company (now Northwest Caster & Equipment ) was founded in Seattle to manufacture and market the carrier, and similar designs were later manufactured by Gerlinger, Hyster, Yale, Caterpillar, and other companies. These "straddles" or "timber jinkers" were a common sight in seaports around the world until the 1970s, but were phased out as larger and faster conventional trucks came into use. An example of these road-going straddle carriers can be seen in the 1950 comedy film Watch the Birdie.

== Industrial straddle carriers ==
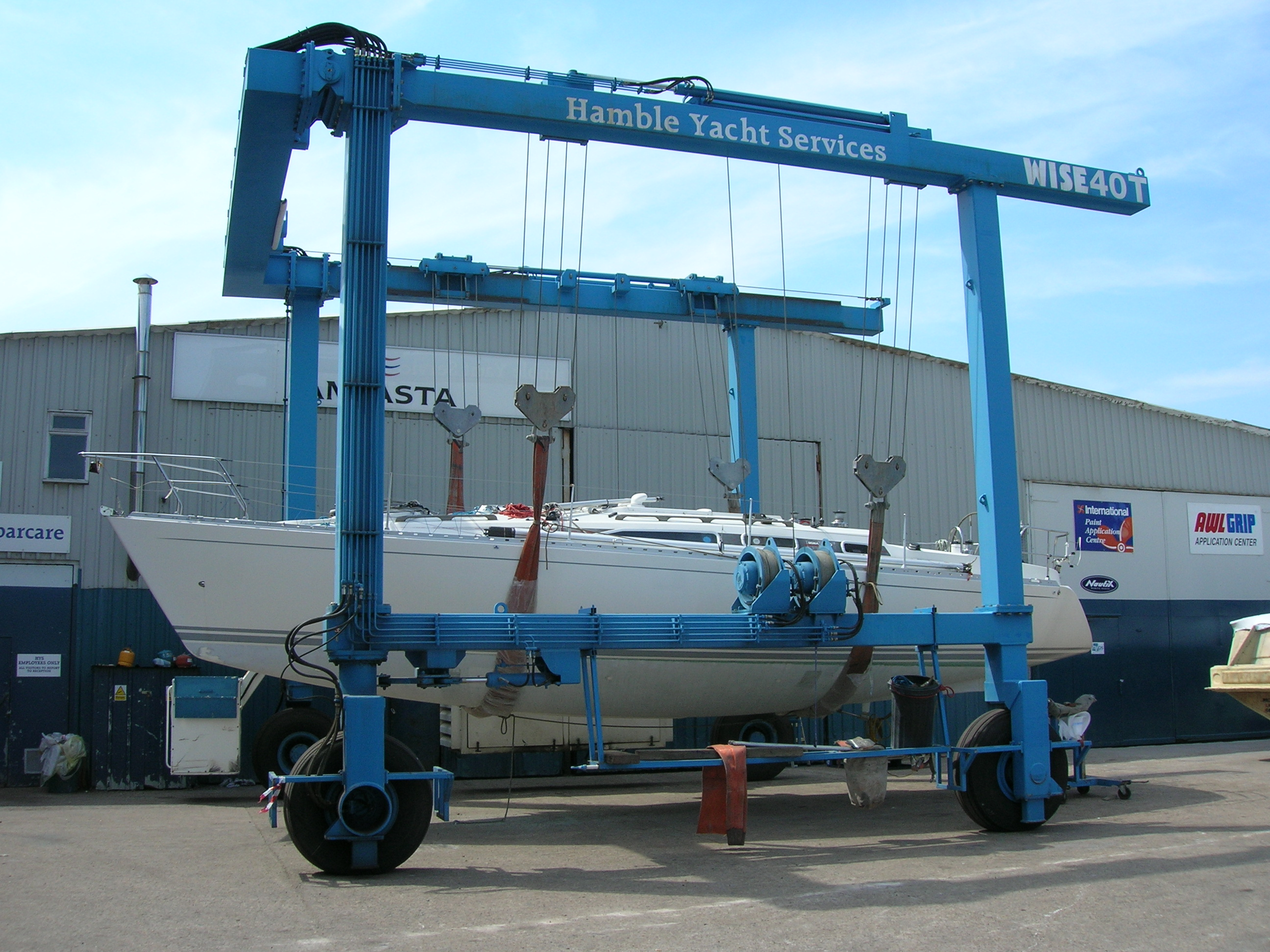
Straddle carrier for sailboats

Similar industrial straddle carriers are used in manufacturing and construction, both for handling oversized loads such as steel and pre-cast concrete and where transportation of special loads such as nitrogen tanks is required in restricted spaces not suitable for trucks. A key advantage of industrial straddle carriers and reach stackers over most forklifts is the ability to load or unload a semi-trailer in a single operation, which can improve efficiency.

Straddle carriers are also used for handling boats onshore. These are also often called travel lifts or travelifts.

== Shipping container carriers ==
The most common use of straddle carriers is in port terminals and intermodal yards, where they are used for stacking and moving ISO standard containers. The carrier straddles its load, picking it up and carrying it by connecting to the top lifting points using a container spreader. Some machines have the ability to stack containers up to four high. They travel at relatively low speeds (up to 30 km/h or 20 mph) with a laden container. Drivers of the carrier sit sideways at the very top, and face the middle, so they can see behind and in front of the vehicle. Straddle carriers can lift up to 60 t (59 long tons; 66 short tons), which equals up to two full containers.

== Gallery ==
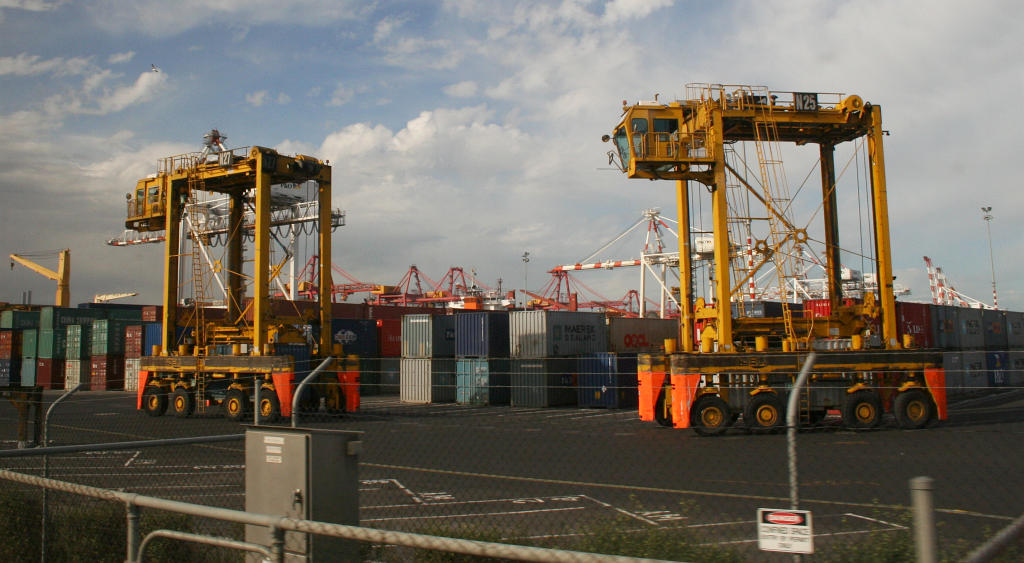
Straddle carriers at work at the Port of Melbourne, Australia

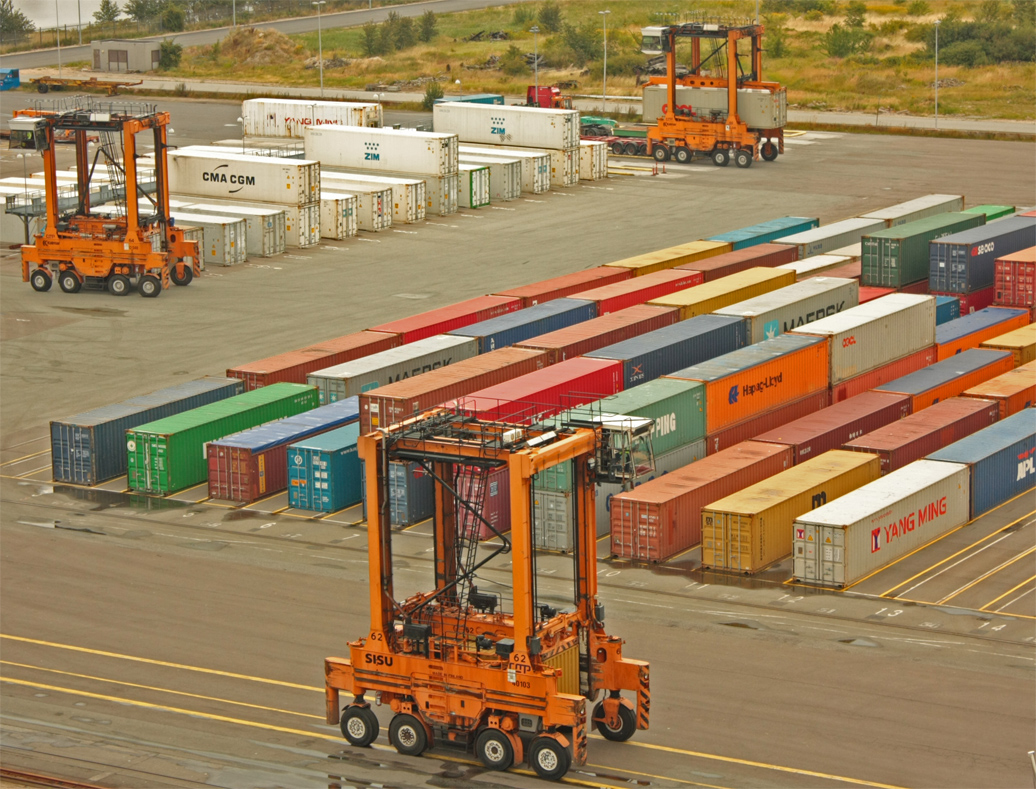
Straddle carriers at the Port of Copenhagen, Denmark.

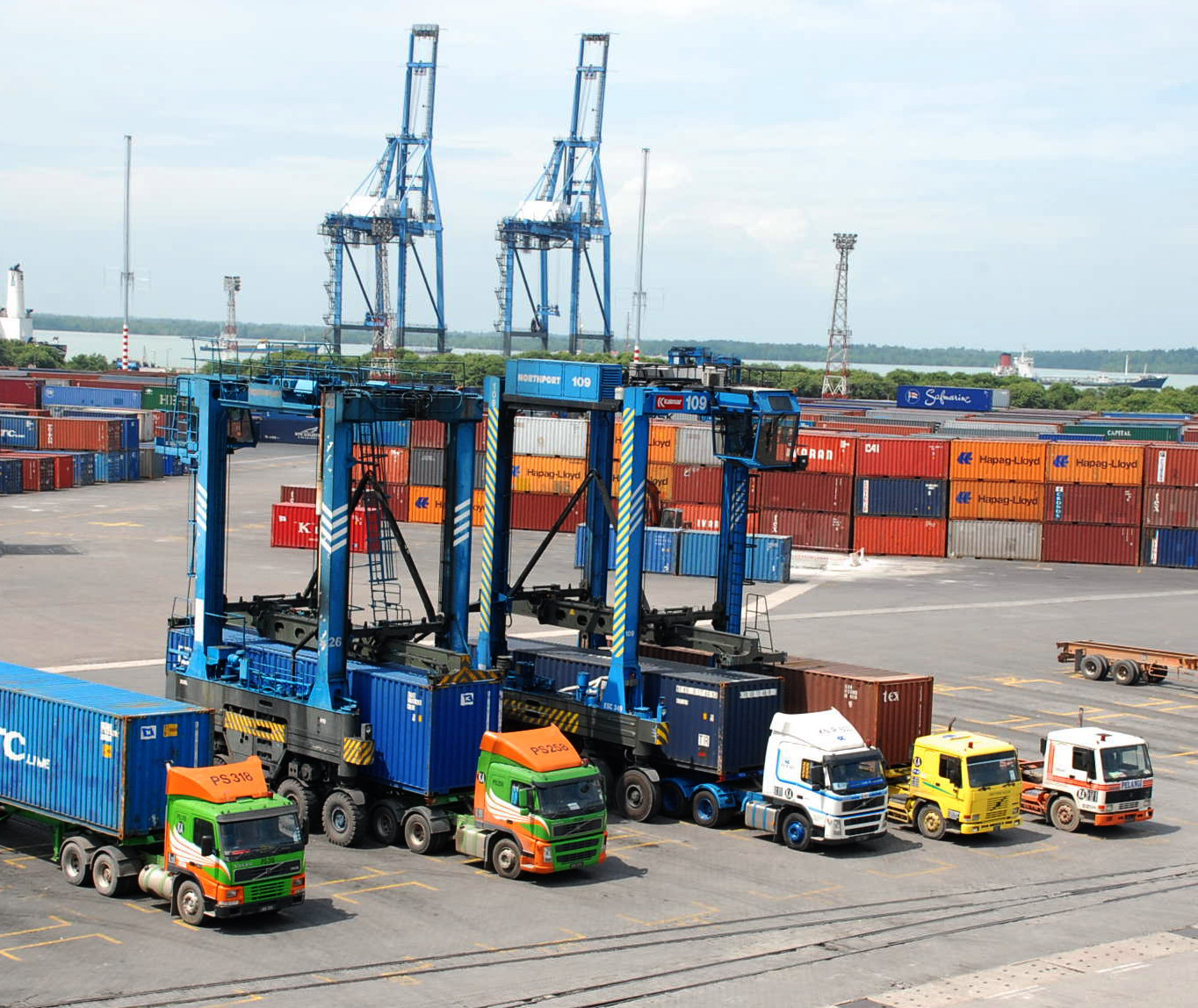
Straddle carriers or SK as known at Northport, Malaysia.

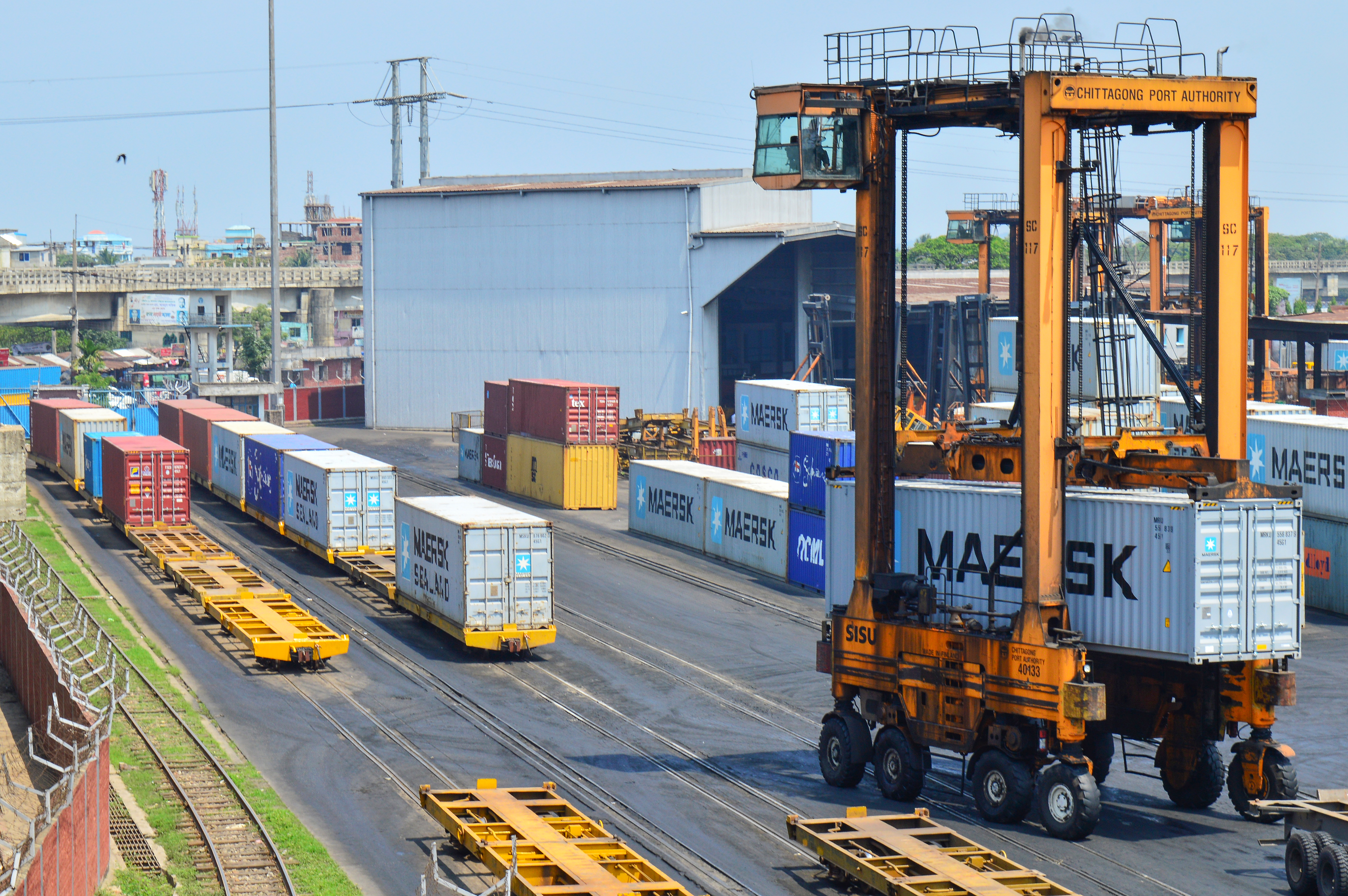
Straddle carrier work at Port of Chittagong.

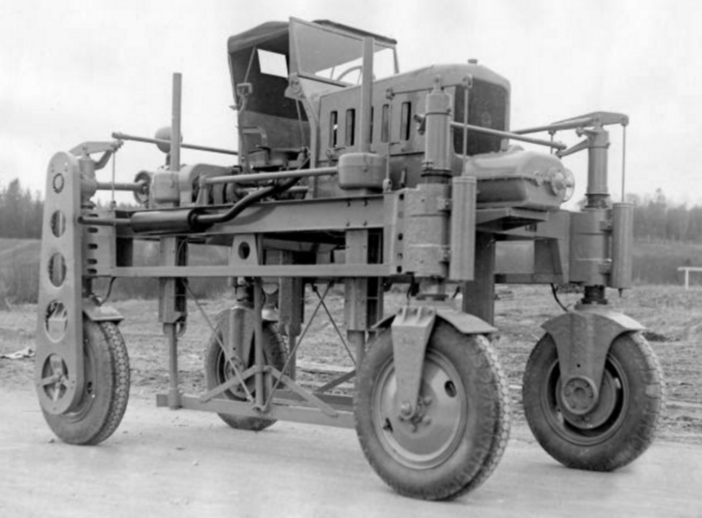
Early straddle carrier

Video of early straddle carrier

A straddle carrier in the USA lifting a container from a double-stack train onto a truck trailer.

== See also ==
- Crane
- Gantry crane
