= Radio Independents Group =

UK's radio producers' organisation

The Radio Independents Group, or RIG, is the trade body that represents the interests of the independent radio producers of the United Kingdom. Established in June 2004, RIG is mandated to negotiate terms with broadcasters and audio consumers, such as digital publishers to benefit its members. The organisation is a non-profit body financed solely through membership fees and donations.

== Current Executive Committee (as of June 2015) ==
- Chair: Phil Critchlow [TBI Media]
- Vice-chair: Mike Hally [Square Dog Radio]
- Secretary: Trevor Dann [Trevor Dann's Company]
- Treasurer: Jack Wynne-Williams [Acme]

Directors

- Ashley Byrne [Made in Manchester]
- Andy Cartwright [Soundscape]
- Sue Clark [Sue Clark Productions]
- Simon Cole [7digital]
- Janet Graves [Pennine Productions]
- Rob Jones [USP]
- Susan Marling [Just Radio]
- Jez Nelson [Somethin' Else]
- David Prest [Whistledown]
- Dan Vo [Heavy Entertainment]

== Membership ==
Membership of RIG is open to any UK-based independent radio producer or production company. RIG membership represents some 95% of total industry turnover. The trade body represents all business sizes, from sole traders and partnerships to limited companies and public companies.

== Independent Radio Producers ==
An independent radio producer is defined as a supplier of radio programmes who is not affiliated with the commissioning broadcaster or company. They can be individuals working as sole traders and partnerships, as well as limited companies and sometimes public companies. There are some indies in radio who are also independent television producers. Many radio indies supply additional audio, training, teaching and various other services due to the low budgets inherent in the industry.

== The Sector ==
For most radio indies, the BBC national radio networks are their programs' main, or only, commissioner. BBC Radio 1, BBC Radio 2, BBC Radio 3, BBC Radio 4, BBC Radio 5 Live, BBC Radio 6 Music, BBC Radio 1Xtra, BBC Asian Network, BBC World Service, BBC Radio Scotland and BBC Radio Wales all actively commission independently produced programming. Unlike the television sector, which has a legally guaranteed 25% share of the BBC's output (with an additional 25% open to competitive bidding), the radio sector has no guarantee. The BBC voluntarily offers approximately 10% of its 'eligible' hours to independent production. This figure has stayed the same for over 13 years, and both the BBC and the British Government refuse to alter the status quo. This has led to an unstable and uncertain sector with many companies pitching for small amounts of air-time. The Radio Independents Group is tasked with increasing the voluntary 'quota'.

Radio Indies also produce many hours of programming for Commercial Radio companies, such as chart shows, traffic & travel bulletins and entertainment news. However, unlike the BBC, the majority of this material is paid for by third-party sponsors rather than by the radio stations. There needs to be more commissioned programming on UK commercial radio due to the cost of making such material and the low programming budgets of commercial radio stations.

== Radio Indies & The BBC ==
Up until Dec 2004, when commissioning programs from independent producers, the BBC would purchase an 'all rights' deal. This meant the independent producer retained no ownership or control over their product. Following negotiations between RIG and the BBC in 2004, the new Terms of Trade now in place have had a considerable positive effect on independent producers:

- Indies now own their productions entirely
- The BBC purchases a 10-year UK-only broadcast license consisting of 2 transmissions and audio-on-demand rights
- Indies can now commercially exploit their productions both in the UK and internationally
- Indies gain improved repeat rates and improved rates for repeats on BBC World Service and BFBS

The BBC has a requirement written into the BBC Agreement to commission a 'suitable proportion' of radio programming from independent producers, which it has set at 10% of 'eligible' hours (i.e. excluding news).

In 2010, the BBC Trust published a report requiring the BBC to operate an additional Window of Creative Competition, set at 10% of eligible hours, encompassing programming for which independents can compete against in-house producers.

In June 2015, the BBC Director of Radio Helen Boaden announced the intention as part of the BBC's 'Compete or Compare' initiative, to put out 60% of eligible radio hours to competition from indie and in-house producers, a target to be reached over six years.

== Radio Production Awards ==
The RIG since 2010 has organized the Radio Production Awards, supported by the Radio Academy. The awards "recognise and celebrate the production skills of radio and audio producers based in the UK or supplying UK-based broadcasters from overseas."

== Current Issues ==
- BBC World Service - new Terms of Trade between the network and the independent sector
- Update to the General BBC Terms of Trade
- Update and continuation of BBC Worldwide BFBS contracts
- Submission to the BBC Trust regarding the damage to indie's rights by the planned BBC Online/iPlayer proposal
- Push for more opportunities and access to air-time for independent producers
- Creation of standardised industry 'draft' contracts
- Supporting the work of the Radio Academy and the Radio Industry Diversity Group
- Training and resources for radio independents
