= Entertainment rigging =

Setting up equipment for shows

Entertainment rigging refers to the systems, techniques, and equipment that suspend and hoist aspects of live entertainment such as lighting equipment, sound equipment, scenery, curtains, and performers.

Rigging in entertainment is divided into three main subjects: theatrical rigging, arena-style rigging, and aerial rigging. The same skills are shared in these areas. The first takes place in a theatre or performing arts space, and typically involves the venue's permanent fly system. Arena rigging occurs in an arena or "exposed structure venue" such as a convention center, ballroom, warehouse, etc. or other place with no roof or defined stage. It usually encompasses a temporary structures of trusses. Aerial rigging is focused on allowing performers to "fly" during a performance, such as a trapeze in a circus.

== Theatrical rigging ==
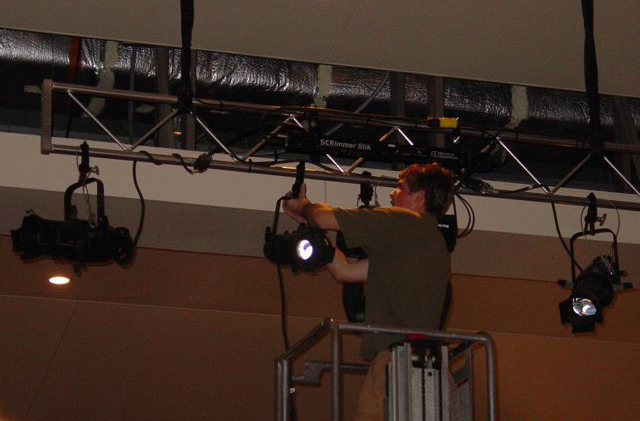
An electrician mounting a spotlight onto a dead-hung batten

Theatrical rigging, as the name suggests, is primarily used in theatrical venues for plays and musicals. It is a field encompassing electricians, riggers, and the fly crew. It involves the process of mounting lights, speakers, and effects, wiring them, and operating them throughout a show.

=== Mounting systems ===
In theatrical rigging, there are two main types of systems, and a venue may have one or a mix of both for hanging equipment. One has the worker go up to the workspace at the ceiling, and the other has the workspace come down to the worker on floor level.

==== Dead hung ====
Dead hung systems are systems where the rigging points such as pipes (called "battens") are fixed to the ceiling or wall, either in individual lines or combined into a grid. Because they cannot be moved, they are "dead". Fly systems require a large space above the stage to store the equipment, which is why this method is usually found in/over the house because of space requirements. It is also commonly used in school theaters because of its affordability. These systems are usually accessed with ladders and hydraulic lifts, or by catwalks.

==== Fly system ====
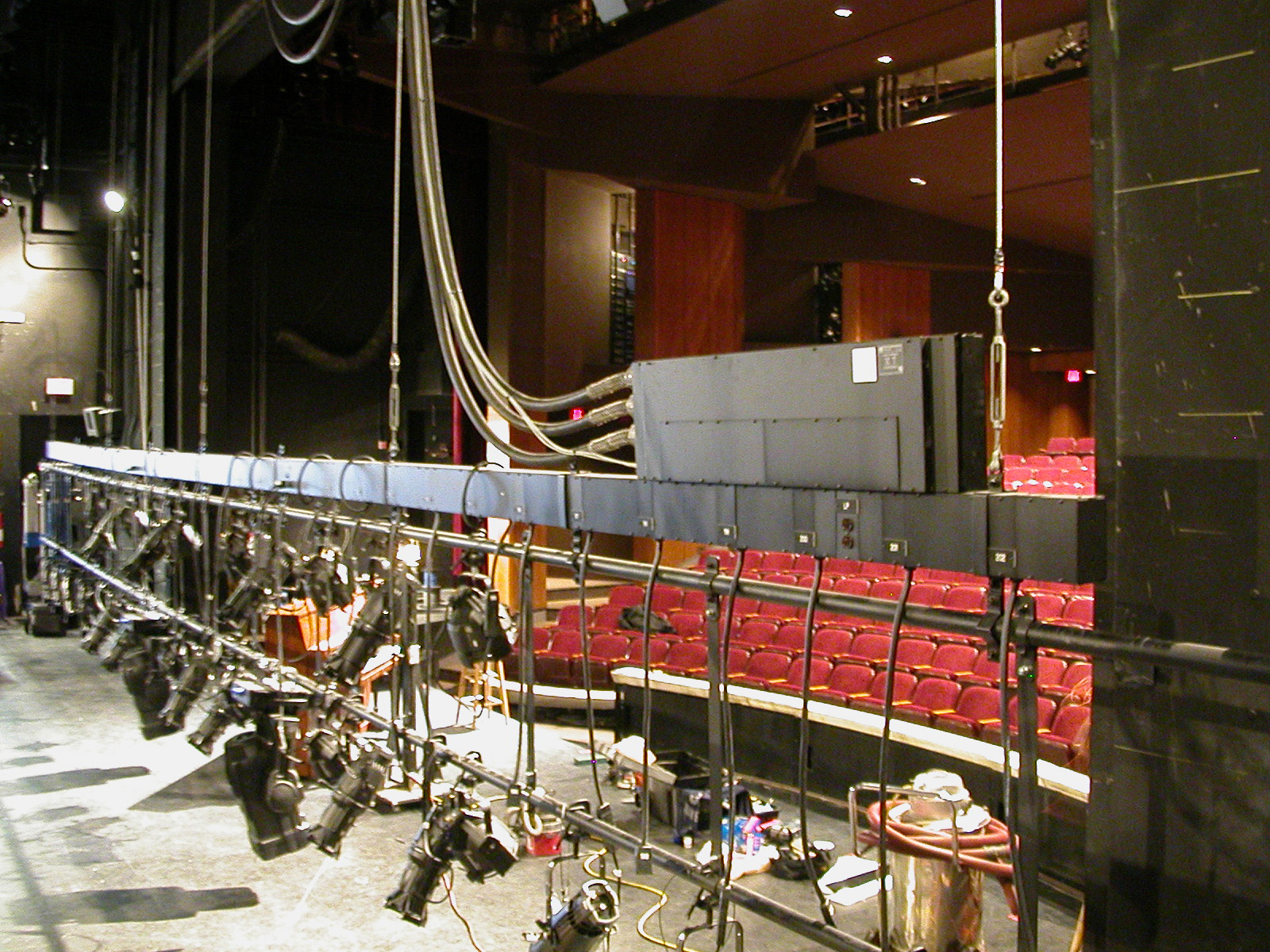
An electric line set flown in

A fly system is a complex arrangement of pulleys, counterweights, and ropes combined to raise and lower battens that have equipment hung on them. Counterweights offset the loads of these battens similar to an elevator, allowing for crew members to easily and quietly raise and lower the ropes. It lends its name to the motion of the equipment "flying" up and down ("out" and "in" respectively). When items are "flown out", they are suspended out of view from the audience in a large space called a fly loft, fly space, or fly tower.

== Arena-style rigging ==
Arena-style rigging uses a series of chain motors, attached to the grid by heavy-duty steel rope and shackles, to lift lighting trusses, curtains, LED walls, and set pieces into place. Riggers typically pull the chain hook, along with the relevant hardware, from the arena floor to the grid via rope, where they then make the connection to the beams. These points are referred to as "dead-hangs" if the chain hook falls directly beneath a beam, or "bridles" if the hardware is attached to two beams so that the chain hook falls between them. Points are often drawn on the floor by a head rigger, who uses trigonometry to determine the correct length of any bridle legs.

Once the points are made, the motors at the bottom are attached to the set, and are able to be "flown" electronically.

== Aerial rigging ==
Aerial rigging or circus rigging consists of aerial acrobatic apparatuses that support people under dynamic loading conditions, such as aerial dance equipment.

Automation rigging is used by many circuses, to fly both humans and scenic or prop elements. Chain motors and trusses are not used as often in tented circuses as in arena or theater rigging, but arena circuses make regular use of them. In both tented and arena circuses, crane-bars or frames stabilized by guy cables, hung from fiber rope block and tackle systems are common, as are systems supporting and tensioning safety nets.

Wire rigging, both high and low, while simple in principle and application, requires substantial load-path capacity, as wire walkers generally require high tension in their systems.

Weak link analysis is the process of systematically analyzing aerial rigging for the weakest link or links in the system. This is the most common process used by aerial riggers to assess and improve rigging. However, it is not the only system used.

== Training ==
Most entertainment rigging training is done either by apprenticeship or formal training through unions, e.g. IATSE. The most advanced hands-on training in the United States is in Las Vegas, at the Nevada Resort Association-IATSE 720 Training Trust in Nevada.

== Certification ==
In the US, the recognized entertainment rigging certification are the ETCP Arena and Theater Rigging Certification Programs and SPRAT rope access training.

In the UK, the PLASA NRC (National Rigging Certificate) is the recognized entertainment rigging certification.
