= John Mankey Riggs =

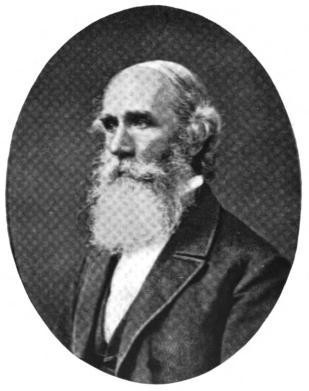
- Born: October 25, 1811; Seymour, Connecticut
- Died: November 11, 1885 (aged 74); Hartford, Connecticut

John Mankey Riggs (October 25, 1811 – November 11, 1885) was the leading authority on periodontal disease and its treatment in the United States, to the point that periodontal disease was known as "Riggs' disease."

== Biography ==
Riggs was born in Seymour, Connecticut and graduated from the Baltimore College of Dental Surgery in 1854.

He practiced dentistry in Hartford, and was seemingly the first individual to limit his practice to periodontics; he is thus considered to be the first specialist in the field.

Riggs was an associate of Horace Wells, and was the first surgeon to operate with a patient under anesthesia by extracting Wells' tooth in 1844 while he was under the influence of nitrous oxide.

He was the personal dentist of American writer Mark Twain.

== Role in early periodontology ==
Riggs was an opponent of periodontal surgery, which at the time consisted of gingival resection. He promoted the concept of proper oral hygiene and prevention.

Riggs first demonstrated his method of conventional periodontal therapy in 1856: he removed salivary and serumal deposits and necrosed bone from the teeth with scrapers that he designed. He then applied a tincture of powdered myrrh and polished the teeth. He published his treatment in 1876.
