= John M. Riggs =

American general (born 1946)

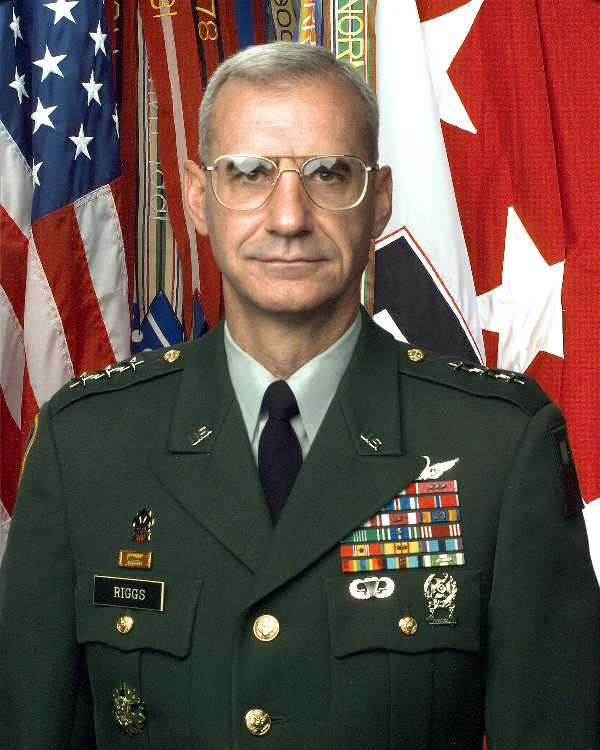
- Official portrait
- Born: Johnny M. Riggs; December 2, 1946 (age 79); Kennett, Missouri, U.S.
- Military career
- Allegiance: United States
- Branch: United States Army
- Service years: 1965–2005
- Rank: Lieutenant General (retired as a major general)
- Commands: First United States Army; 7th Infantry Division; 17th Aviation Brigade; 19th Aviation Battalion
- Conflicts: Vietnam War
- Awards: Army Distinguished Service Medal; Legion of Merit (5); Distinguished Flying Cross; Bronze Star Medal

John M. Riggs (born December 2, 1946) is a retired United States Army general. He was retired in 2005. He had attained the rank of lieutenant general, but was retired with the loss of one star, at the rank of major general. According to the army, this was because of misuse of contractors, but some of Riggs' supporters argued that the retirement and demotion was a result of his contradiction of the United States government stance on troop strength needed to support the actions in Afghanistan and Iraq.

== Education ==
Born in Kennett, Missouri, Riggs is a 1964 graduate of Caruthersville High School in Caruthersville, Missouri. Riggs earned Bachelor of Arts in political science from Tarkio College and a Master of Arts in personnel management and administration from Central Michigan University. In addition, Riggs completed a National Security Fellowship at the John F. Kennedy School of Government, Harvard University.

== Military career ==
He enlisted in the United States Army in 1965. Commissioned a second lieutenant in 1969, he graduated from the Infantry Officers Candidate School at Fort Benning, Georgia. He served a combat tour in Vietnam as a helicopter pilot, for which he was awarded the Distinguished Flying Cross.

Riggs commanded at company, battalion, brigade, division, and army levels, serving in Vietnam, Germany, Korea, Belgium and numerous assignments throughout the United States. He commanded the 19th Aviation Battalion and the 17th Aviation Brigade in Korea. Later assignments were as Assistant Division Commander for the 3rd Infantry Division in Germany; Deputy Commanding General United States Army Aviation School, Fort Rucker, Alabama; Assistant Deputy Chief of Staff Operations and Plans, Washington, DC; and Commanding General 7th Infantry Division, Fort Carson, Colorado.

== Retirement ==
In 2006, Riggs, along with a number of other retired senior United States military officials—Lieutenant General Gregory S. Newbold (USMC), Major General Paul Eaton (Army), and General Anthony Zinni (USMC)—called for the resignation of Secretary of Defense Donald Rumsfeld over his handling of the Iraq War. In an interview with NPR's Michele Norris, Riggs said, "I think he should step aside and let someone step in who can be more realistic."
