= National Register of Historic Places listings in Dunklin County, Missouri =

Location of Dunklin County in Missouri

This is a list of the National Register of Historic Places listings in Dunklin County, Missouri.

This is intended to be a complete list of the properties and districts on the National Register of Historic Places in Dunklin County, Missouri, United States. Latitude and longitude coordinates are provided for many National Register properties and districts; these locations may be seen together in a map.

There are 8 properties and districts listed on the National Register in the county.

This National Park Service list is complete through NPS recent listings posted August 21, 2026.

== Current listings ==
	Name on the Register	Image	Date listed	Location	City or town	Description
1	Charles and Bettie Birthright House	Charles and Bettie Birthright House	October 30, 2009 (#09000857)	109 S. Main St. 36°27′02″N 89°58′02″W	Clarkton	
2	Campbell Commercial Historic District	Campbell Commercial Historic District	October 8, 1991 (#91001482)	Roughly bounded by Magnolia St., Martin Ave., Locust St. and the St. Louis & Southwest RR tracks 36°29′35″N 90°04′30″W	Campbell	
3	Ely and Walker Shirt Factory No. 5	Ely and Walker Shirt Factory No. 5	March 12, 2008 (#07001319)	221 S. Main St. 36°14′07″N 90°03′26″W	Kennett	
4	Kennett Archeological Site		February 17, 1978 (#78001644)	Address Restricted	Kennett	
5	Kennett City Hall and Masonic Lodge		September 17, 1981 (#81000333)	122 College St. 36°14′11″N 90°04′08″W	Kennett	
6	Langdon Site	Langdon Site	January 11, 1974 (#74001072)	Both sides of Missouri Route 164, 3 miles (4.8 km) north of Hornersville; 36°04′46″N 90°05′43″W	Hornersville	
7	Little River Lake Discontiguous Archeological District		December 16, 1998 (#98001499)	Address Restricted	Kennett	
8	Given Owens House	Given Owens House	March 29, 1983 (#83000987)	Off Route 53; 36°30′30″N 90°06′25″W	Campbell	

== See also ==
- List of National Historic Landmarks in Missouri
- National Register of Historic Places listings in Missouri
