= KDFN =

- Doniphan, Missouri; United States
- Frequency: 1500 kHz
- Branding: Oldies 1500

Programming
- Format: Oldies

Ownership
- Owner: Eagle Bluff Enterprises
- Sister stations: KAHR; KFEB; KOEA; KPPL; KXOQ

History
- First air date: February 4, 1963
- Last air date: March 23, 2017

Technical information
- Facility ID: 29621
- Class: D
- Power: 1,000 watts day
- Transmitter coordinates: 36°36′51.2″N 90°49′22.4″W

KDFN (1500 AM, Oldies 1500) was a radio station that broadcast an oldies music format. Formally licensed to Doniphan, Missouri, United States, KDFN was owned by Eagle Bluff Enterprises.

KDFN went on the air February 4, 1963. Eagle Bluff Enterprises surrendered the license for KDFN to the Federal Communications Commission (FCC) on March 23, 2017, who subsequently cancelled it.

== History of call letters ==
Prior to 1948, the call letters KDFN were assigned to an AM station in Casper, Wyoming. In 1948, that station received the call letters KSPR.
