= Dunklin County, Missouri =

County in Missouri, United States

- County
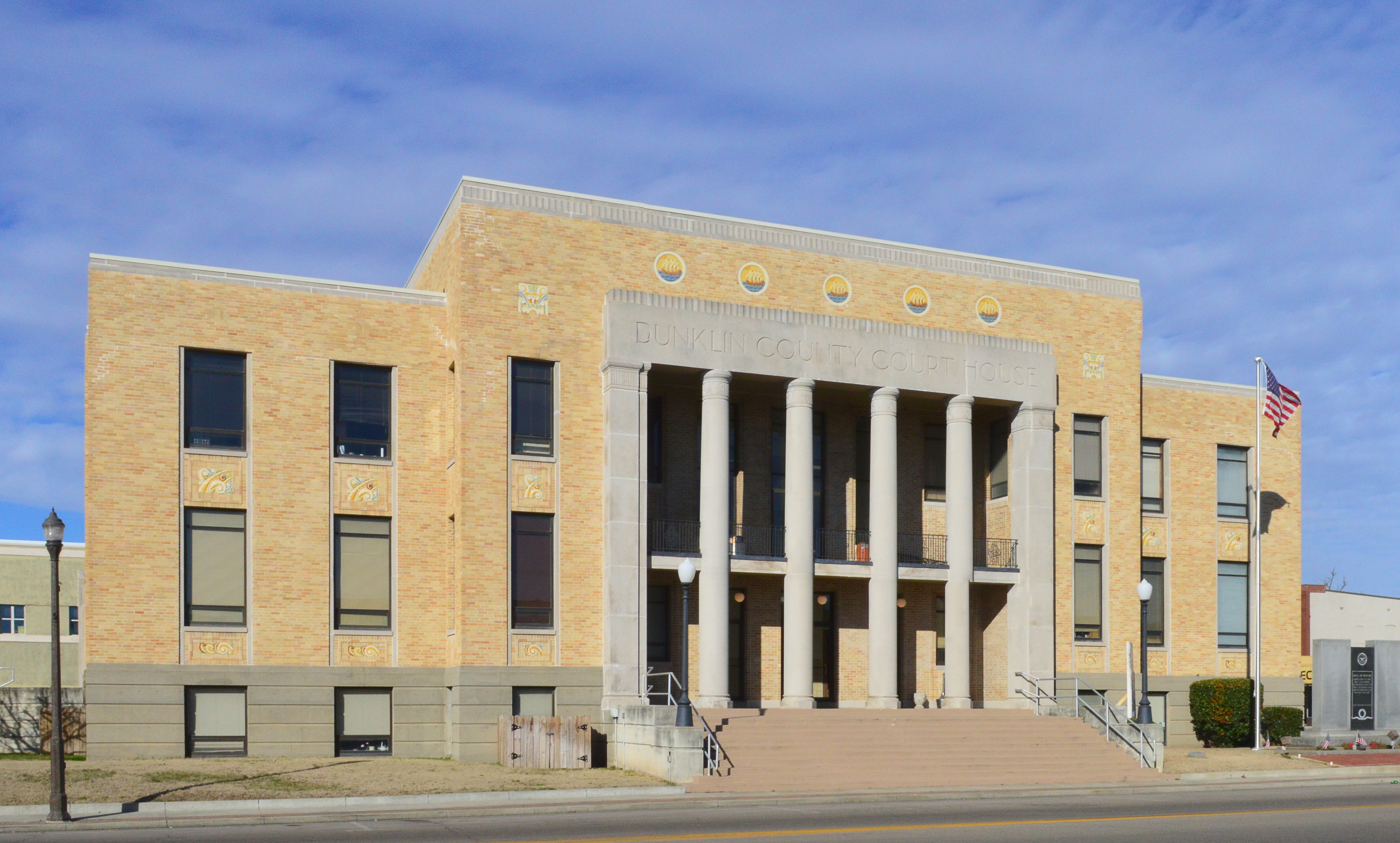
- Dunklin County Courthouse in Kennett

- Location within the U.S. state of Missouri
- Coordinates: 36°16′N 90°05′W
- Country: United States
- State: Missouri
- Founded: February 14, 1845
- Named for: Daniel Dunklin
- Seat: Kennett
- Largest city: Kennett

Area
  - Total: 547 sq mi (1,420 km^{2})
  - Land: 541 sq mi (1,400 km^{2})
  - Water: 6.1 sq mi (16 km^{2}) 1.1%

Population (2020)
  - Total: 28,283
  - Estimate (2025): 26,855 ▼
  - Density: 52.3/sq mi (20.2/km^{2})
- Time zone: UTC−6 (Central)
  - Summer (DST): UTC−5 (CDT)
- Congressional district: 8th
- Website: dunklincounty.org

Dunklin County is located in the Bootheel of the U.S. state of Missouri. As of the 2020 census, the population was 28,283. The largest city and county seat is Kennett.

Dunklin County comprises the Kennett, MO Micropolitan Statistical Area.

== History ==
The land comprising Dunklin County was previously inhabited by the Delaware Tribe of Indians, who had lived in the area since the early 1800s. The county was officially created from Stoddard County on February 14, 1845, and named in honor of Daniel Dunklin, a Governor of Missouri who died the year before the county was organized.

The first courthouse, a two-story log cabin, in the county was erected in 1847 by Hiram Langdon in Kennett. It burned in the mid 1860s, during or just after the American Civil War and took most of the county records with it. A second courthouse was constructed in 1872, but it also burned down soon after it was completed. The county government rented a building on the south side of the court square from 1872 to 1892. In 1892, the third courthouse, a two-story brick building, was constructed on the square. This building was replaced by the current courthouse in 1929, which was constructed by the Works Progress Administration.

== Geography ==
According to the U.S. Census Bureau, the county has a total area of 547 square miles (1,420 km^{2}), of which 541 square miles (1,400 km^{2}) is land and 6.1 square miles (16 km^{2}) (1.1%) is water. The lowest point in the state of Missouri is located on the St. Francis River in Buffalo Township in Dunklin County, where it flows out of Missouri and into Arkansas.

Unlike most of Missouri, most of Dunklin County is in the Sun Belt, defined by the Kinder Institute as being south of 36°30'N latitude.

=== Adjacent counties ===
- Stoddard County (north)
- New Madrid County (northeast)
- Pemiscot County (east)
- Mississippi County, Arkansas (southeast)
- Craighead County, Arkansas (south)
- Greene County, Arkansas (southwest)
- Clay County, Arkansas (west)
- Butler County (northwest)

== Demographics ==
Historical population
Census	Pop.	Note	%±
1850	1,229		—
1860	5,026		309.0%
1870	5,982		19.0%
1880	9,604		60.5%
1890	15,085		57.1%
1900	21,706		43.9%
1910	30,328		39.7%
1920	32,773		8.1%
1930	35,799		9.2%
1940	44,957		25.6%
1950	45,329		0.8%
1960	39,139		−13.7%
1970	33,742		−13.8%
1980	36,324		7.7%
1990	33,112		−8.8%
2000	33,155		0.1%
2010	31,953		−3.6%
2020	28,283		−11.5%
2025 (est.)	26,855	▼	−5.0%
U.S. Decennial Census; 1790-1960 1900-1990; 1990-2000 2010-2015 2020

=== 2020 census ===
As of the 2020 census, the county had a population of 28,283 and a median age of 40.9 years. 24.6% of residents were under the age of 18 and 19.0% of residents were 65 years of age or older. For every 100 females there were 94.0 males, and for every 100 females age 18 and over there were 90.2 males age 18 and over.

37.3% of residents lived in urban areas, while 62.7% lived in rural areas.

There were 11,573 households in the county, of which 29.4% had children under the age of 18 living with them and 32.6% had a female householder with no spouse or partner present. About 32.6% of all households were made up of individuals and 14.8% had someone living alone who was 65 years of age or older.

There were 13,409 housing units, of which 13.7% were vacant. Among occupied housing units, 61.7% were owner-occupied and 38.3% were renter-occupied. The homeowner vacancy rate was 2.5% and the rental vacancy rate was 9.3%.

The 2020 racial and ethnic composition is detailed in the table below.

=== 2020 census ===
Dunklin County, Missouri – Racial and ethnic composition Note: the US Census treats Hispanic/Latino as an ethnic category. This table excludes Latinos from the racial categories and assigns them to a separate category. Hispanics/Latinos may be of any race.
Race / Ethnicity (NH = Non-Hispanic)	Pop 1980	Pop 1990	Pop 2000	Pop 2010	Pop 2020	% 1980	% 1990	% 2000	% 2010	% 2020
White alone (NH)	33,754	30,155	28,963	26,498	21,629	92.92%	91.07%	87.36%	82.93%	76.47%
Black or African American alone (NH)	2,275	2,624	2,873	3,081	3,176	6.26%	7.92%	8.67%	9.64%	11.23%
Native American or Alaska Native alone (NH)	36	84	97	67	70	0.10%	0.25%	0.29%	0.21%	0.25%
Asian alone (NH)	33	70	88	107	78	0.09%	0.21%	0.27%	0.33%	0.28%
Native Hawaiian or Pacific Islander alone (NH)	x	x	3	7	4	x	x	0.01%	0.02%	0.01%
Other race alone (NH)	14	10	7	14	65	0.04%	0.03%	0.02%	0.04%	0.23%
Mixed race or Multiracial (NH)	x	x	300	452	1,219	x	x	0.90%	1.41%	4.31%
Hispanic or Latino (any race)	212	169	824	1,727	2,042	0.58%	0.51%	2.49%	5.40%	7.22%
Total	36,324	33,112	33,155	31,953	28,283	100.00%	100.00%	100.00%	100.00%	100.00%

=== 2000 census ===
As of the 2000 census of 2000, there were 33,155 people, 13,411 households, and 9,159 families residing in the county. The population density was 61 people per square mile (24 people/km^{2}). There were 14,682 housing units at an average density of 27 units per square mile (10/km^{2}). The racial makeup of the county was 88.64% White, 8.68% Black or African American, 0.31% Native American, 0.27% Asian, 0.01% Pacific Islander, 1.03% from other races, and 1.06% from two or more races. Approximately 2.49% of the population were Hispanic or Latino of any race. Among the major first ancestries reported in Dunklin County were 38.8% American, 10.6% Irish, 8.2% German, and 7.5% English ancestry.

There were 13,411 households, of which 31.30% had children under the age of 18 living with them, 51.60% were married couples living together, 13.20% had a female householder with no husband present, and 31.70% were "non-families." Of all households, 28.10% consisted of individuals and 14.00% had someone living alone who was 65 years of age or older. The average household size was 2.42 and the average family size was 2.94.

Of the county's population, 26.00% were under the age of 18, 8.10% were from 18 to 24, 26.00% were from 25 to 44, 23.50% were from 45 to 64, and 16.50% were 65 years of age or older. The median age was 38 years. For every 100 females there were 89.60 males. For every 100 women age 18 and over, there were 85.10 men.

The median income for a household in the county was $30,927, and the median income for a family was $38,439. Males had a median income of $27,288 versus $18,142 for females. The per capita income for the county was $16,737. About 19.40% of families and 24.50% of the population were below the poverty line, including 33.90% of those under age 18 and 21.30% of those age 65 or over. Of the state's 115 counties, in 2010 Dunklin ranked 105th in terms of poverty.

== Education ==
Of adults 25 years of age and older in Dunklin County, 63.7% possess a high school diploma or higher while 9.1% hold a bachelor's degree or higher as their highest educational attainment.

School districts including sections of the county, no matter how slight, even if the relevant schools and/or administration buildings in another county:

- Bernie R-XIII School District
- Campbell R-II School District
- Clarkton C-4 School District
- Delta C-7 School District
- Holcomb R-III School District
- Kennett 39 School District
- Malden R-I School District
- Senath-Hornersville C-8 School District
- Southland C-9 School District

=== Public schools ===
- Campbell R-II School District - Campbell
  - Campbell Elementary School (PK-06)
  - Campbell High School (07-12)
- Clarkton C-4 School District - Clarkton
  - Clarkton Elementary School (PK-06)
  - Clarkton High School (07-12)
- Holcomb R-III School District - Holcomb
  - Holcomb Elementary School (PK-06)
  - Holcomb High School (07-12)
- Kennett School District 39 - Kennett
  - Early Childhood Center - (PK) - Primary School
  - H. Byron Masterson Elementary School (K-02)
  - South Elementary School (03-05)
  - Kennett Middle School (06-08)
  - Kennett High School (09-12)
- Malden R-I School District - Malden
  - Malden Elementary School (PK-06)
  - Malden High School (07-12)
- Senath-Hornersville C-8 School District - Senath
  - Senath Elementary School (PK-04)
  - Hornersville Middle School (05-08)
  - Senath-Hornersville High School (09-12)
- Southland C-9 School District - Cardwell
  - Southland Elementary School (K-06)
  - Southland High School (07-12)

=== Private schools ===
- Kennett Christian Academy - Kennett - (K-12) - Assemblies of God/Pentecostal
- St. Teresa School - Campbell - (PK-08) - Roman Catholic

=== Alternative and vocational schools ===
- Bootheel State School - Clarkton - (K-12) - A school for handicapped and special need students.
- Diagnostic Center - Kennett - (PK-12) - Special Education
- Kennett Area Vocational School - Kennett - (09-12) - Vocational/technical

=== Public libraries ===
- Dunklin County Library
- Arbyrd Community Library

=== Colleges and universities ===
Three Rivers College's service area includes Dunklin County.

== Transportation ==
=== Major highways ===
- U.S. Route 62
- U.S. Route 412
- Route 25
- Route 53
- Route 84
- Route 153
- Route 164

=== Airports ===
Kennett Memorial Airport is a public-use airport in Dunklin County. It is located one nautical mile (1.85 km) southeast of the central business district of Kennett, which owns the airport.

== Health care ==
The county no longer has a hospital as the Twin Rivers Regional Medical Center closed on June 11, 2018. The nearest hospital is now Pemiscot County Hospital in Hayti. The region suffers from high infant and maternal mortality rates.

== Media ==
=== Radio ===
FM

- FM 89.9 KAUF Kennett
- FM 92.9 KLSC Malden
- LPFM 102.5 KCJS Kennett
- FM 104.3 KXOQ Kennett
- FM 105.5 KBOA-FM Piggott, AR-Kennett
- FM 106.5 KTMO New Madrid-Kennett
- FM 107.5 KFEB Campbell

AM

- AM1470 KMAL Malden
- AM1540 KBOA Kennett

=== Print ===
- Campbell Courier, Campbell, Missouri
- Delta Dunklin Democrat, Kennett, Missouri

=== Television ===
There are no television stations in Dunklin County, Missouri. Dunklin County, Missouri is placed in the Paducah, KY, Cape Girardeau, MO, & Harrisburg, Illinois Television Market. Those stations include:

- ABC- WSIL 3
- NBC- WPSD 6
- CBS- KFVS 12
- FOX- KBSI 23
- PBS- WSIU 8 & WKPD 29
- MYTV- WDKA 49

However some residents in the south end of the county watch stations from the Memphis, TN and Jonesboro, AR Television Markets.

== Politics ==
=== Local ===
Dunklin County was once a Democratic stronghold. However, like the rest of Southeast Missouri and the Bootheel in particular, the county has swung Republican. In 2020 alone, three formerly Democratic officials switched their registration to Republican, and Republicans now control every elected office.

Dunklin County, Missouri

Elected countywide officials
Assessor	Rena Ingram	Republican
Circuit Clerk	Paula Gargus	Republican
County Clerk	Kent Hampton	Republican
Commissioner (presiding)	Don Collins	Republican
Commissioner (district 1)	Ron Huber	Republican
Commissioner (district 2)	Patrick McHaney	Republican
Coroner	James Powell	Republican
Prosecuting Attorney	Nicholas Jain	Republican
Public Administrator	Matt Jackson	Republican
Recorder	Angela Casey	Republican
Sheriff	Nick Darter	Republican
Treasurer/Collector	Judy Thompson	Republican

=== State ===
Past Gubernatorial Elections Results
Year	Republican	Democratic	Third Parties
2024	81.40% 8,040	16.73% 1,652	1.87% 185
2020	76.40% 7,880	22.10% 2,281	1.10% 118
2016	69.40% 7,253	28.90% 3,014	0.80% 84
2012	43.55% 4,560	54.03% 5,657	2.43% 254
2008	41.65% 4,792	56.13% 6,458	2.22% 255
2004	52.46% 6,015	46.25% 5,302	1.29% 148
2000	42.70% 4,471	56.11% 5,875	1.19% 125
1996	31.51% 3,232	66.86% 6,858	1.63% 167
1992	39.36% 4,309	60.64% 6,640	0.00% 0
1988	58.16% 5,822	41.74% 4,178	0.10% 10
1984	51.01% 5,407	48.99% 5,193	0.00% 0
1980	46.29% 5,203	53.62% 6,026	0.09% 10
1976	40.86% 4,131	59.08% 5,974	0.06% 6
1972	49.07% 4,239	50.85% 4,393	0.09% 7
1968	25.16% 2,879	74.84% 8,566	0.00% 0
1964	24.32% 2,804	75.68% 8,724	0.00% 0
1960	30.71% 3,938	69.29% 8,884	0.00% 0

In the Missouri House of Representatives, Dunklin County is divided into two legislative districts, both of which are represented by Republicans.

- District 150 – Consists of most of the county (the central and southern portions). The district includes the entire city of Kennett as well as the communities of Campbell, Clarkton, Holcomb, Senath, Hornersville, Rives, Arbyrd, and Cardwell. Andrew McDaniel, a Republican from Deering.

Missouri House – District 150 – Dunklin County (2020)
Party	Candidate	Votes	%	±%
Republican	Andrew McDaniel		100.00%	

Missouri House – District 150 – Dunklin County (2018)
Party	Candidate	Votes	%	±%
Republican	Andrew McDaniel	4,521	79.14%	
Democratic	Josh Rittenberry	1,192	20.86%	

Missouri House – District 150 – Dunklin County (2016)
Party	Candidate	Votes	%	±%
Republican	Andrew McDaniel	5,226	69.10%	
Democratic	Lena Samford	2,337	30.90%	

Missouri House – District 150 – Dunklin County (2014)
Party	Candidate	Votes	%	±%
Republican	Andrew McDaniel	1,934	47.62%	
Democratic	Walter Dearing	2,127	52.48%	

- District 152 – Consists of the northern portion of the county and takes in the entire city of Malden. Hardy Billington, a Republican from Poplar Bluff.

Missouri House – District 152 – Dunklin County (2020)
Party	Candidate	Votes	%	±%
Republican	Hardy Billington		100.00%	

Missouri House – District 152 – Dunklin County (2018)
Party	Candidate	Votes	%	±%
Republican	Hardy Billington	1,483	68.44%	
Democratic	Robert L. Smith	684	31.56%	

Missouri House – District 152 – Dunklin County (2016)
Party	Candidate	Votes	%	±%
Republican	Todd Richardson		100.00%	

Missouri House – District 152 – Dunklin County (2014)
Party	Candidate	Votes	%	±%
Republican	Todd Richardson		100.00%	

In the Missouri Senate, all of Dunklin County is a part of Missouri's 25th District and is currently represented by Republican Jason Bean of Poplar Bluff.

Missouri Senate – District 25 – Dunklin County (2020)
Party	Candidate	Votes	%	±%
Republican	Jason Bean		100.00%	

Missouri Senate – District 25 – Dunklin County (2016)
Party	Candidate	Votes	%	±%
Republican	Doug Libla	6,952	68.51%	
Democratic	William D. "Bill" Burlison	3,195	31.49%	

Missouri Senate – District 25 – Dunklin County (2012)
Party	Candidate	Votes	%	±%
Republican	Doug Libla	5,056	48.65%	
Democratic	Terry Swinger	5,337	51.35%	

=== Federal ===
Missouri's two U.S. senators are Republicans Josh Hawley and Eric Schmitt.

Claire McCaskill was reelected to her second term in 2012 with 54.81 percent of the statewide vote over former Republican U.S. Representative W. Todd Akin of Town & Country and Libertarian Jonathan Dine of Riverside; Dunklin County gave McCaskill just over 50 and a half percent of the vote.

U.S. Senate - Class I – Dunklin County (2012)
Party	Candidate	Votes	%	±%
Democratic	Claire McCaskill	5,347	50.69	
Republican	W. Todd Akin	4,806	45.56	
Libertarian	Jonathan Dine	395	3.74	

U.S. Senate - Class I – Dunklin County (2018)
Party	Candidate	Votes	%	±%
Democratic	Claire McCaskill	1,988	24.90	
Republican	Josh Hawley	5,802	72.70	
Independent	Craig O'Dear	82	1.00	

Roy Blunt was elected to his first term in 2010 with 54.23 percent of the statewide vote over former Democratic Missouri Secretary of State Robin Carnahan, Libertarian Jonathan Dine of Riverside, and Constitutionalist Jerry Beck of Novelty; Dunklin County voters backed Blunt with just under 62 and a half percent of the vote.

U.S. Senate - Class III – Dunklin County (2010)
Party	Candidate	Votes	%	±%
Republican	Roy Blunt	4,306	62.48	
Democratic	Robin Carnahan	2,363	34.29	
Libertarian	Jonathan Dine	121	1.76	
Constitution	Jerry Beck	102	1.48	

U.S. Senate - Class III – Dunklin County (2016)
Party	Candidate	Votes	%	±%
Republican	Roy Blunt	6,536	63.00	
Democratic	Jason Kander	3,433	33.10	
Libertarian	Jonathan Dine	172	1.70	

All of Dunklin County is included in Missouri's 8th Congressional District and is currently represented by Republican Jason T. Smith of Salem in the U.S. House of Representatives. Smith won a special election on Tuesday, June 4, 2013, to complete the remaining term of former Republican U.S. Representative Jo Ann Emerson of Cape Girardeau. Emerson announced her resignation a month after being reelected with over 70 percent of the vote in the district. She resigned to become CEO of the National Rural Electric Cooperative.

U.S. House of Representatives - District 8 – Dunklin County (2012)
Party	Candidate	Votes	%	±%
Republican	Jo Ann Emerson	7,416	70.66	+4.06
Democratic	Jack Rushin	2,884	27.48	−3.34
Libertarian	Rick Vandeven	196	1.87	+0.87

U.S. House of Representatives - District 8 - Special Election – Dunklin County (2013)
Party	Candidate	Votes	%	±%
Republican	Jason T. Smith	1,407	67.22	
Democratic	Steve Hodges	618	29.53	
Constitution	Doug Enyart	37	1.77	
Libertarian	Bill Slantz	30	1.43	
Write-In	Thomas Brown	1	0.05	

U.S. House of Representatives - District 8 – Dunklin County (2018)
Party	Candidate	Votes	%	±%
Republican	Jason T. Smith	5,978	75.50	
Democratic	Kathy Ellis	1,857	23.50	
Libertarian	Jonathan Shell	81	1.00	

U.S. House of Representatives - District 8 – Dunklin County (2020)
Party	Candidate	Votes	%	±%
Republican	Jason T. Smith	7,978	78.40	
Democratic	Kathy Ellis	2,074	20.40	
Libertarian	Tom Schmitz	129	1.30	

==== Political culture ====
United States presidential election results for Dunklin County, Missouri
Year	Republican		Democratic		Third party(ies)	
Year	No.	%	No.	%	No.	%
1888	719	28.12%	1,838	71.88%	0	0.00%
1892	659	22.00%	2,167	72.33%	170	5.67%
1896	961	24.38%	2,975	75.47%	6	0.15%
1900	1,276	31.43%	2,711	66.77%	73	1.80%
1904	1,461	38.47%	2,229	58.69%	108	2.84%
1908	1,638	35.17%	2,734	58.69%	286	6.14%
1912	987	18.81%	2,723	51.89%	1,538	29.31%
1916	1,924	31.89%	3,723	61.71%	386	6.40%
1920	4,455	44.72%	5,199	52.18%	309	3.10%
1924	3,436	42.67%	4,357	54.11%	259	3.22%
1928	3,602	42.37%	4,879	57.39%	20	0.24%
1932	1,977	17.63%	9,141	81.54%	93	0.83%
1936	3,775	26.84%	10,233	72.75%	58	0.41%
1940	5,516	33.07%	11,132	66.74%	32	0.19%
1944	4,274	33.57%	8,431	66.22%	27	0.21%
1948	2,466	18.32%	10,979	81.56%	16	0.12%
1952	5,400	36.18%	9,515	63.76%	9	0.06%
1956	4,943	36.24%	8,698	63.76%	0	0.00%
1960	6,708	50.53%	6,568	49.47%	0	0.00%
1964	3,465	29.04%	8,467	70.96%	0	0.00%
1968	4,366	35.40%	5,063	41.06%	2,903	23.54%
1972	5,926	68.10%	2,776	31.90%	0	0.00%
1976	3,314	31.73%	7,107	68.06%	22	0.21%
1980	5,253	45.56%	6,120	53.08%	157	1.36%
1984	6,092	55.09%	4,967	44.91%	0	0.00%
1988	5,026	48.70%	5,281	51.17%	13	0.13%
1992	4,024	35.06%	6,277	54.68%	1,178	10.26%
1996	3,766	37.02%	5,428	53.36%	979	9.62%
2000	5,426	51.55%	4,947	47.00%	152	1.44%
2004	6,720	57.55%	4,901	41.97%	56	0.48%
2008	7,044	59.88%	4,540	38.59%	180	1.53%
2012	6,850	64.31%	3,636	34.14%	165	1.55%
2016	8,026	75.87%	2,360	22.31%	192	1.82%
2020	8,135	78.08%	2,200	21.12%	84	0.81%
2024	8,096	80.55%	1,885	18.75%	70	0.70%

Historically, Dunklin County has tended to support Democrats at the presidential level. A predominantly rural county in the heavily impoverished Bootheel with a fairly substantial African American population, Democrats at all levels have historically performed quite well in Dunklin County. Bill Clinton of neighboring Arkansas was the last Democratic presidential nominee to carry the county in 1996; since then, Dunklin County has, like virtually all counties throughout the state, experienced a rapid trend rightward, as Republicans have been surging at the presidential level. Voters in Dunklin County have left their historically Democratic roots as Republicans hold all the local elected offices in the county, and statewide elections have done much the same.

Like most rural areas throughout Missouri, voters in Dunklin County generally adhere to socially and culturally conservative principles but are more moderate or populist on economic issues, typical of the Dixiecrat philosophy. In 2004, Missourians voted on a constitutional amendment to define marriage as the union between a man and a woman—it overwhelmingly passed Dunklin County with 87.57 percent of the vote. The initiative passed the state with 71 percent of support from voters as Missouri became the first state to ban same-sex marriage. In 2006, Missourians voted on a constitutional amendment to fund and legalize embryonic stem cell research in the state—it failed in Dunklin County with 53.70 percent voting against the measure. The initiative narrowly passed the state with 51 percent of support from voters as Missouri became one of the first states in the nation to approve embryonic stem cell research. Despite Dunklin County's longstanding tradition of supporting socially conservative platforms, voters in the county have a penchant for advancing populist causes like increasing the minimum wage. In 2006, Missourians voted on a proposition (Proposition B) to increase the minimum wage in the state to $6.50 an hour—it passed Dunklin County with 79.42 percent of the vote. The proposition strongly passed every single county in Missouri with 78.99 percent voting in favor as the minimum wage was increased to $6.50 an hour in the state. During the same election, voters in five other states also strongly approved increases in the minimum wage.

=== Missouri presidential preference primary (2008) ===
In the 2008 Missouri Presidential Preference Primary, voters in Dunklin County from both political parties supported candidates who finished in second place in the state at large and nationally.

Former U.S. Senator Hillary Clinton (D-New York) received more votes in Dunklin County, 2,587, than any candidate from either party during the 2008 Missouri Democratic presidential preference primary. The 2,587 is more votes than the total number cast in the entire Republican primary in Dunklin County.

== Communities ==
=== Cities ===
- Arbyrd
- Campbell
- Cardwell
- Clarkton
- Holcomb
- Hornersville
- Kennett (county seat)
- Malden
- Senath

=== Town ===
- Rives

=== Census-designated places ===
- Frisbee
- Hollywood
- White Oak

=== Unincorporated Communities ===
- Arkmo
- Baird
- Brian
- Buck Donic
- Bucoda
- Caruth
- Cockrum
- Cotton Plant
- Dillman
- Europa
- Gibson
- Glennonville
- Gobler
- Hargrove
- Ipley
- Mackeys
- Marlow
- McGuire
- Nesbit
- Octa
- Providence
- Sumach
- Townley
- Valley Ridge
- Vincit
- Wilhelmina
- Wrightsville

=== Townships ===
- Buffalo
- Clay
- Cotton Hill
- Freeborn
- Holcomb
- Independence
- Salem
- Union

== Notable people ==
- Sheryl Crow, Grammy-winning singer/songwriter, was born in Kennett and grew up there.
- David Nail, country music singer, was born and raised in Kennett.
- Trent Tomlinson, country music singer/songwriter, was born and raised in Kennett
- Onie Wheeler, country music and bluegrass musician

== See also ==
- National Register of Historic Places listings in Dunklin County, Missouri
