= KBOA =

KBOA may refer to:

- KBOA (AM), a radio station (1540 AM) licensed to Kennett, Missouri, United States
- KBOA-FM, a radio station (105.5 FM) licensed to Piggott, Arkansas, United States
