= KCRV =

KCRV may refer to:

- KCRV (AM), a radio station (1370 AM) licensed to Caruthersville, Missouri, United States
- KCRV-FM, a radio station (105.1 FM) licensed to Caruthersville, Missouri, United States
