= Green Wave =

Green Wave may refer to:

- Green wave, a series of traffic lights coordinated to allow continuous traffic flow in one main direction
- The Green Wave, a 2010 documentary film directed by Iranian-German Ali Samadi Ahadi
- Green Wave (radio show), a Vietnamese music chart programme
- The Green Wave, an 1866 painting by Claude Monet
- Green Wave (abortion rights), a group of abortion-rights activists in the Americas
- "Green Wave", a cultivar of the polypodium fern
- Green Wave, a preservationist group, organized by Russian singer and actor Mikhail Novitsky
- Greenwave, a mass science experiment involving primary schools across Ireland
- GreenWave, an aquaculture non-profit in North America
- Green Wave (Malaysia), a political phenomenon in Malaysia

== Sports teams ==
=== College teams ===
- Tulane Green Wave, the athletic teams of Tulane University, New Orleans, Louisiana, United States

=== United States high schools teams ===
- Abington High School, Abington, Massachusetts
- Ashbrook High School (North Carolina), Gastonia, North Carolina
- Audubon High School, Audubon, New Jersey
- Cathedral High School (Natchez, Mississippi)
- Churchill County High School, Fallon, Nevada
- Clintwood High School, Clintwood, Virginia
- Dover High School (New Hampshire), Dover, New Hampshire
- Easley High School, Easley, South Carolina
- East Grand Forks Senior High School, East Grand Forks, Minnesota
- Father Lopez Catholic High School, Daytona Beach, Florida
- Fort Myers High School, Fort Myers, Florida
- Gallatin High School (Tennessee), Gallatin, Tennessee
- Greenville High School (Ohio), Greenville, Ohio
- Greenfield High School (Massachusetts), Greenfield, Massachusetts
- Holy Name High School, Parma Heights, Ohio
- Hudson Catholic High School (Hudson, Massachusetts)
- Leeds High School, Leeds, Alabama
- Long Branch High School, Long Branch, New Jersey
- Malden High School, Malden, Missouri
- Mattoon High School, Mattoon, Illinois
- Meade County High School, Brandenburg, Kentucky
- Mount Saint Joseph Academy (Rutland, Vermont)
- Narrows High School, Narrows, Virginia
- Newark Catholic High School, Newark, Ohio
- New Milford High School (Connecticut), New Milford, Connecticut
- Ponchatoula High School, Ponchatoula, Louisiana
- Spencer High School (Columbus, Georgia)
- St. Edward Central Catholic High School (Elgin, Illinois)
- Summerville High School, Summerville, South Carolina
- Delbarton School, Morristown, New Jersey
- West Point High School (Mississippi), West Point, Mississippi
