= Caruth, Missouri =

Unincorporated community in Dunklin County, Missouri

Coordinates: 36°08′03″N 90°05′12″W

Caruth is an unincorporated community in Dunklin County, Missouri, U.S. state.

The community is on Missouri Route Y, approximately 6.5 miles south of Kennett and 3.5 miles east of Senath on Missouri Route P. The community of Cotton Plant is three miles south on Route Y.

== History ==
The first settlement at Caruth was made in 1881. The founder gave the community the last name of a personal acquaintance, Mr. Caruth, a businessman from St. Louis. Caruth's post office was established in 1882 and remained operational until 1913.
