= Europa, Missouri =

Unincorporated community in Missouri, U.S.

Coordinates: 36°05′24″N 90°10′39″W

Europa is an unincorporated community in Dunklin County, in the U.S. state of Missouri.

The community is at the intersection of Missouri Routes C and N approximately three miles south-southwest of Senath. The community of Bucoda lies two miles west on Route N.

== History ==
A post office called Europa was established in 1898, and remained in operation until 1906. The community may be named after Europa, a princess in Greek mythology.
