= Townley (disambiguation) =

Townley is a surname.

Townley may also refer to:

- Townley, Alabama
- Townley, Indiana
- Townley, Missouri
- Townley (crater) on the Moon
- Townley Grammar School, in London
