= Wrightsville, Missouri =

Unincorporated community in Dunklin County, Missouri

Coordinates: 36°28′23″N 89°59′45″W

Wrightsville is an unincorporated community in Dunklin County, in the U.S. state of Missouri. The community lies on County road 327 approximately 4.5 miles ESE of Campbell and 2.1 miles northwest of Clarkton.

== History ==
A post office called Wrightsville was established in 1869, and remained in operation until 1907. The community was named after the Wright brothers, local merchants.
