= Sumac (disambiguation) =

Sumac may refer to:

- Soumak rug (also spelt Soumakh, Sumak, Sumac, or Soumac), a type of weft-wrapped flatwoven Oriental rug
- Sumac (band), a 2010s American/Canadian rock band
- Sumac, any one of approximately 250 species of flowering plants in the genus Rhus and related genera
  - A spice made from the plant Rhus coriaria
  - Poison sumac, Toxicodendron vernix (formerly classified as Rhus vernix)
- Sumach, Missouri, a community in the United States
- Yma Sumac, a Peruvian folk and Latin singer
- Sumac Centre, an independent community and social centre in Nottingham, UK
- Stanford University Mathematics Camp, a competitive summer mathematics program for rising high school juniors and seniors
