= Ipley, Missouri =

Unincorporated community in Dunklin County, Missouri

Coordinates: 36°17′41″N 90°01′43″W

Ipley is an unincorporated community in Dunklin County, in the U.S. state of Missouri. The community lies approximately four miles northeast of Kennett on Missouri Route 25. The community of White Oak lies 2.5 mile north on Route 25.

== History ==
A variant name was "Shipley". A post office called Shipley was established in 1903, and remained in operation until 1913. The community derives its name from Hugh Shipley, a pioneer citizen.
