= Clarkton =

Clarkton may refer to:

- Clarkton, North Carolina
- Clarkton, Missouri
