= Octa =

Octa may refer to:

== Places ==
- Octa, Missouri
- Octa, Ohio

== People ==
- Octa of Kent (6th century), king of Kent

== Other uses ==
- Octa (unit), a proposed unit of information by Donald Knuth denoting 64 bit
- Office of the Chief Trade Adviser
- Orange County Transportation Authority
- Oregon-California Trails Association
- Oregon Cannabis Tax Act
- Overseas Countries and Territories Association
- Optical coherence tomography angiography, an imaging modality for visualizing vasculature
- Octa-, a prefix meaning eight
- Land Rover Defender OCTA, a high-performance luxury SUV

== See also ==
- Okta (disambiguation)
