= Campbell Commercial Historic District =

Historic district in Missouri, United States

- U.S. National Register of Historic Places
- U.S. Historic district
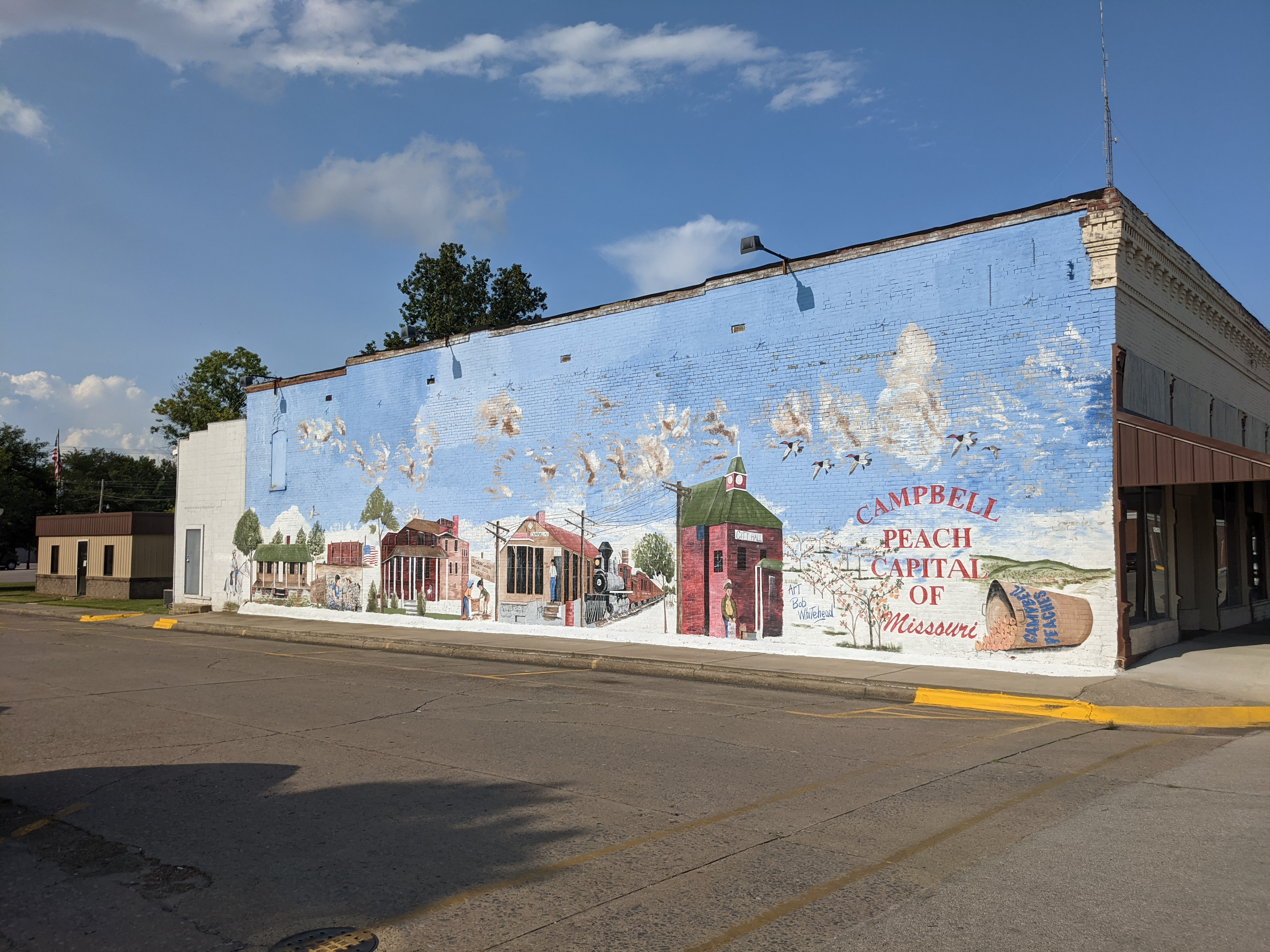
- Campbell, Peach Capital of Missouri mural

- Location within Missouri Location within the United States
- Location: Roughly bounded by Magnolia St., Martin Ave., Locust St. and the St. Louis & Southwest RR tracks, Campbell, Missouri
- Coordinates: 36°29′35″N 90°04′30″W
- Area: 4.5 acres (1.8 ha)
- Architect: Christopher & Simpson; Et al.
- Architectural style: Colonial Revival
- NRHP reference No.: 91001482
- Added to NRHP: October 8, 1991

Campbell Commercial Historic District is a national historic district located at Campbell, Dunklin County, Missouri. The district encompasses 19 contributing buildings in the central business district of Campbell. The district developed between 1883 and 1930, and includes representative examples of Colonial Revival style architecture. Notable buildings include the Rice Hardware Company (c. 1910), Cotton Belt Hotel (c. 1900), City Hall (1906), Boyd's Department Store (c. 1909), and Pol-Mac Hotel.

It was listed on the National Register of Historic Places in 1991.
