= Charles and Bettie Birthright House =

Historic house in Missouri, United States

- U.S. National Register of Historic Places
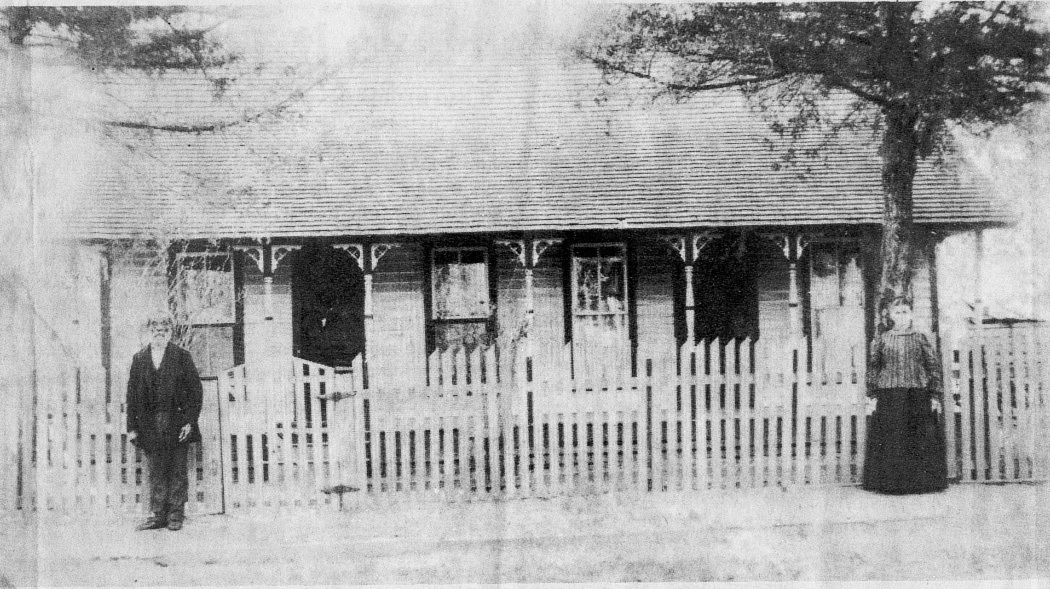
- Charles and Bettie at home, c. 1910.

- Location within Missouri Location within the United States
- Location: 109 S. Main St., Clarkton, Missouri
- Coordinates: 36°27′2″N 89°58′3″W
- Built: 1872, c. 1914
- Architectural style: Frame gable and wing
- NRHP reference No.: 09000857
- Added to NRHP: October 30, 2009

The Charles and Bettie Birthright House is in Clarkton, Dunklin County, Missouri. Built in 1872, the house was occupied by Charles and Bettie Birthright for approximately 40 years, who were African American community leaders in Dunklin County. It was listed on the National Register of Historic Places in 2009.

== History ==
The house, at 109 S. Main Street, was built in 1872 by Charles and Bettie Birthright. Both were born into slavery—Charles in Tennessee in 1833 and Bettie in Virginia in 1840—and met after their enslavers moved to Missouri in the 1850s. They married in 1860 and lived in separate households until they were freed after the Civil War.

Over time, they accumulated more than 400 acres of land and became landowners and community figures in Dunklin County. They supported local institutions, including funding for school buildings. Through a bequest made in 1893, their estate was left to the Tuscaloosa Institute (later Stillman Institute, now Stillman College), where it became one of the largest contributions received by the institution.

The house was listed on the National Register of Historic Places in 2009.

== Description ==
The house was built in 1872 as a double-pen, side-gable dwelling with a full-width porch. Around 1914, a 1½-story addition created a front-gable wing. The structure rests on a brick and concrete foundation.

The house has experienced termite damage and structural issues associated with earthquake activity.

== Gallery ==
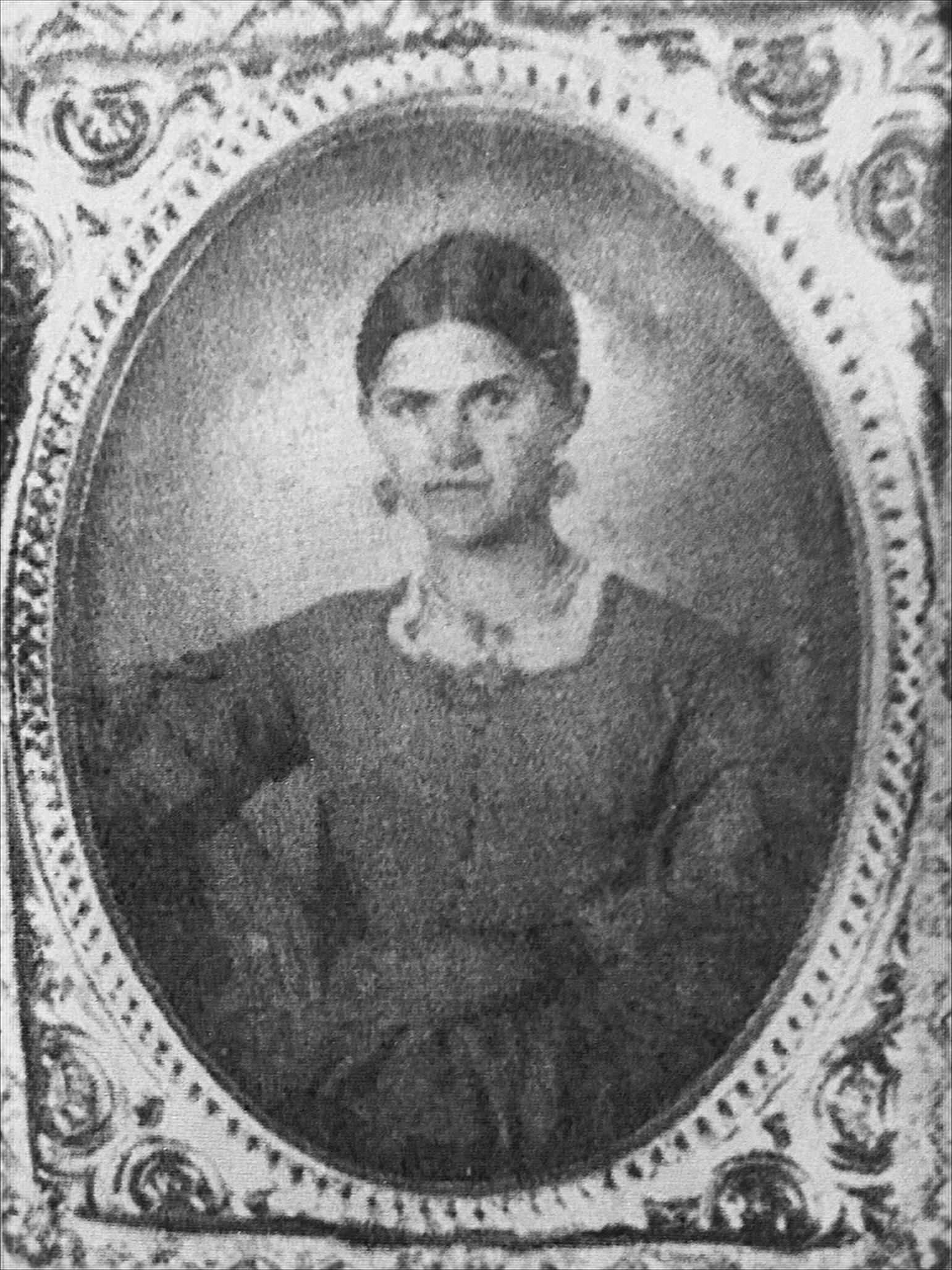
Bettie Scott Birthright, c. 1865

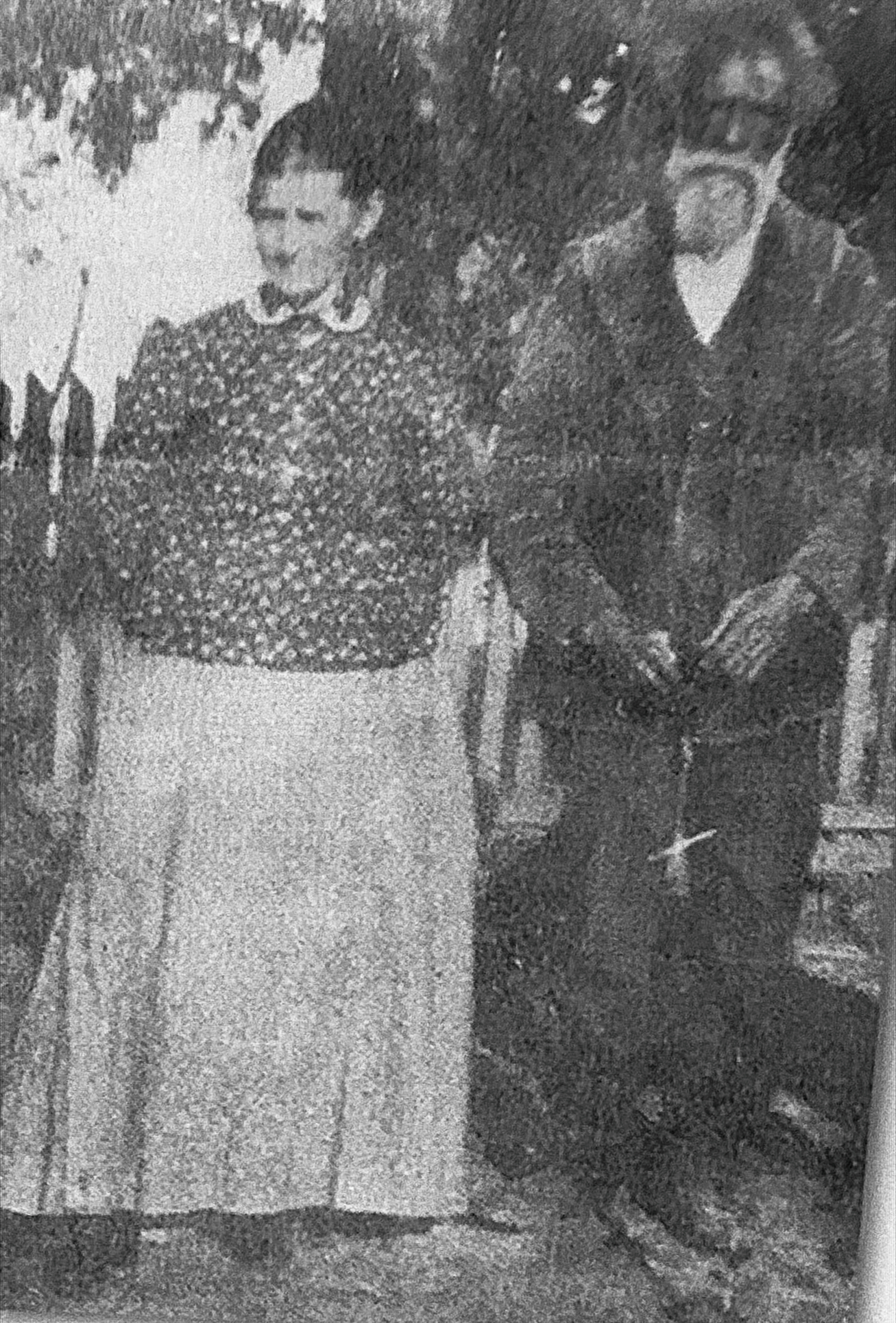
Bettie and Charles, c. 1900

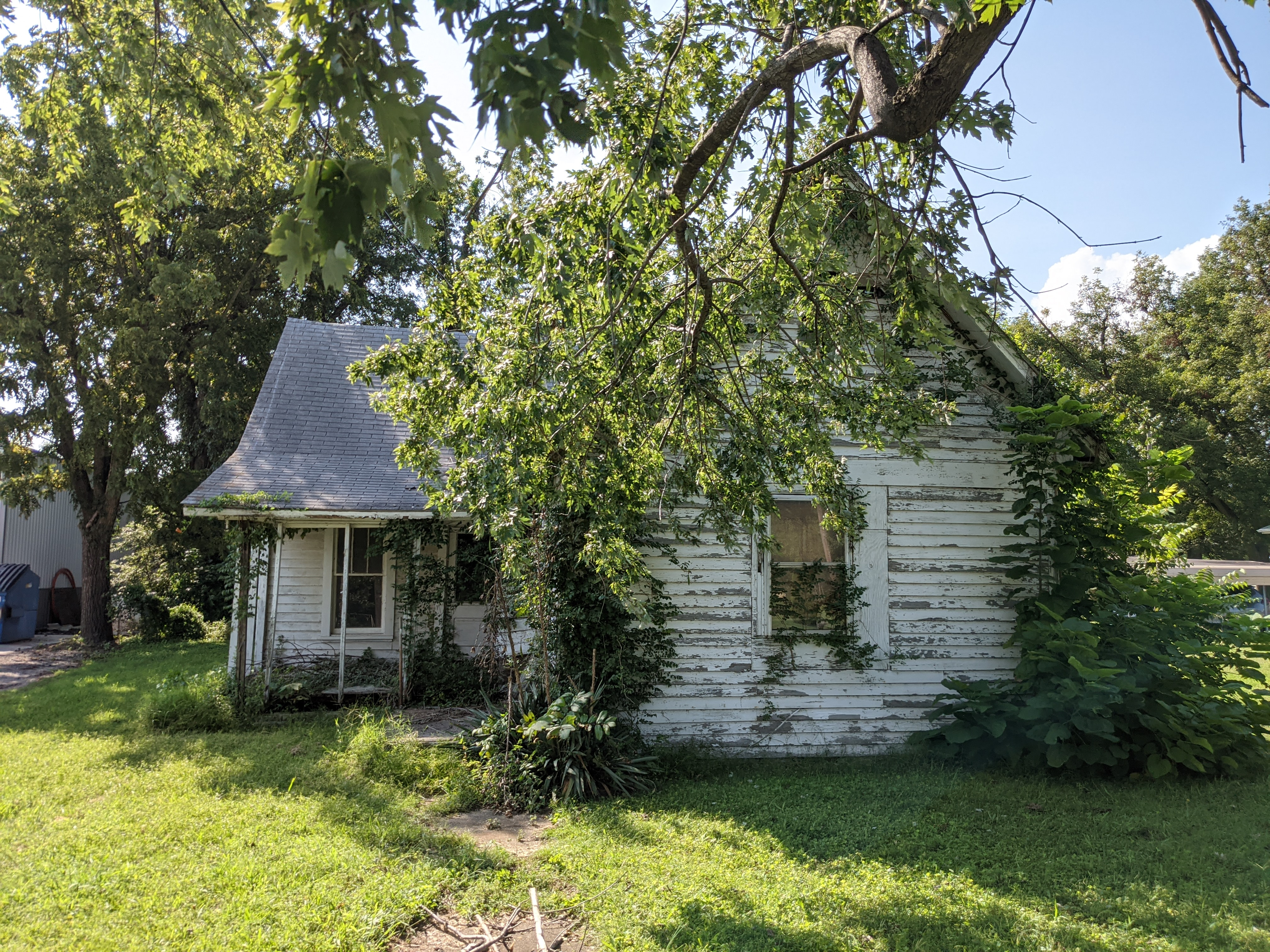
Birthright house, 2020
