= Gary Blaylock =

American baseball player (1931–2026)

- Pitcher
- Born: October 11, 1931; Clarkton, Missouri, U.S.
- Died: February 7, 2026 (aged 94); Clarkton, Missouri, U.S.
- Batted: Right Threw: Right

MLB debut
- April 10, 1959, for the St. Louis Cardinals

Last MLB appearance
- September 27, 1959, for the New York Yankees

MLB statistics
- Win–loss record: 4–6
- Earned run average: 4.80
- Strikeouts: 81
- Stats at Baseball Reference

Teams
- As player: St. Louis Cardinals (1959); New York Yankees (1959); As coach: Kansas City Royals (1984–1987)

Career highlights and awards
- World Series champion (1985)

Gary Nelson Blaylock (October 11, 1931 – February 7, 2026) was an American professional baseball player, coach, scout and manager. A right-handed pitcher, he appeared in Major League Baseball for the St. Louis Cardinals and the New York Yankees during the 1959 season. The native of Clarkton, Missouri, was listed as 6 feet (1.83 m) tall and 196 pounds (89 kg).

== Biography ==
In 41 career Major League games, 13 as a starting pitcher, Blaylock had a 4–6 record with a 4.80 earned run average. In 125 2/3 innings pitched, he gave up 147 hits and 58 bases on balls. Blaylock recorded 81 strikeouts and three complete games. He also spent three seasons in the Venezuelan Professional Baseball League, two with the Industriales de Valencia and one with the Licoreros de Pampero, going 15–13 in 35 career games.

Blaylock was signed by the Cardinals in 1950 and spent nine seasons in the St. Louis farm system, winning 97 games before making the 1959 MLB roster. After 26 games pitched with the Cardinals, and five appearances as a pinch runner, he was claimed off waivers by the Yankees on July 26, 1959, and worked in 15 more games that season. He then resumed his minor league pitching career in 1960, before becoming a manager and instructor in the Yankee farm system in 1963.

He moved to the Kansas City Royals' organization in the early 1970s, managed the Billings Mustangs of the Rookie-level Pioneer League from 1971 to 1973 and then was a scout and minor league instructor before serving as the MLB Royals' pitching coach from 1984 to 1987. He was a member of the Royals' 1985 world championship team. Blaylock was inducted into the Dunklin County Hall of Honor in 2010 at the Dunklin County Library in Kennett, Missouri.

Blaylock died at his home in Clarkton on February 7, 2026, at the age of 94.

Preceded by Cloyd Boyer	Kansas City Royals pitching coach 1984–1987	Succeeded by Frank Funk
