= Valley Ridge =

Valley Ridge may refer to:

- Valley Ridge, Calgary
- Valley Ridge, Missouri
- Valley Ridge (Winter sports resort) proposed indoor resort in Suffolk, England
