= Branums Point, Missouri =

Extinct town in Dunklin County, Missouri

Coordinates: 36°00′03″N 90°06′34″W

Branums Point (also known as Branum) is an extinct town in Dunklin County, in the U.S. state of Missouri. The GNIS classifies it as a populated place.

Branum's Point was founded ca. 1830 by Michael Branum, and named for him. A post office called Branum was established in 1901, and remained in operation until 1909.
