= Buffalo Township, Dunklin County, Missouri =

Extinct town in the U.S. state of Missouri

Coordinates: 36.0480109°N 90.2944261°W

Buffalo Township is a township in Dunklin County, in the U.S. state of Missouri.

Buffalo Township was established in 1845, and named for a creek of the same name within its borders. The largest and only city in the township is Cardwell.
