= Mackeys, Missouri =

Unincorporated community in Dunklin County, Missouri

Coordinates: 36°14′55″N 89°59′43″W

Mackeys is an unincorporated community in Dunklin County, in the U.S. state of Missouri.

The community derives its name from Virgil McKay, original owner of the site.
