= Freeborn Township, Dunklin County, Missouri =

Township in Dunklin County, Missouri, U.S.

Coordinates: 36.4408268°N 89.9914097°W

Freeborn Township is a township in Dunklin County, in the U.S. state of Missouri.

Freeborn Township was established in 1845.
