= Brian, Missouri =

Unincorporated community in Dunklin County, Missouri

Coordinates: 36°36′24″N 90°05′35″W

Brian is an unincorporated community in Dunklin County, in the U.S. state of Missouri.

== History ==
A post office called Brian was established in 1910 and remained in operation until 1926. The community has the name of the local Brian family.
