= Bucoda, Missouri =

- Unincorporated community
- Location within Missouri
- Coordinates: 36°05′24″N 90°12′51″W
- Country: United States
- State: Missouri
- County: Dunklin
- Elevation: 249 ft (76 m)
- Time zone: UTC-6 (Central (CST))
  - Summer (DST): UTC-5 (CDT)
- Area code: 573
- GNIS feature ID: 738036

Bucoda is an unincorporated community in Dunklin County, Missouri, United States. Bucoda is located on U.S. Route 412, 4.3 miles (6.9 km) southwest of Senath.

An early variant name was Byrds, after A. R. Byrds, the original owner of the site. The present name is an amalgamation of the surnames of early settlers Buchanan, Coburn, and Davis. A post office called Byrds was established in 1895, the name was changed to Bucoda in 1917, and the post office closed in 1930.
