= Jake Crawford =

American baseball player (1928-2008)

- Outfielder
- Born: March 20, 1928; Campbell, Missouri, U.S.
- Died: October 21, 2008 (aged 80); Fort Worth, Texas, U.S.
- Batted: Right Threw: Right

MLB debut
- September 7, 1952, for the St. Louis Browns

Last MLB appearance
- September 28, 1952, for the St. Louis Browns

MLB statistics
- Batting average: .182
- Home runs: 0
- Runs batted in: 0

Teams
- St. Louis Browns (1952)

Rufus "Jake" Crawford (March 20, 1928 – October 21, 2008) was an American professional baseball player who appeared in seven games in Major League Baseball as an outfielder and pinch hitter for the St. Louis Browns in 1952. He threw and batted right-handed and was listed as 6 feet 1 inch (1.85 m) tall and 185 pounds (84 kg).

After graduating from high school in his native Campbell, Missouri, Crawford attended the University of Missouri. He signed with the Browns in 1949 and made his major league debut on September 7, 1952, after four minor league seasons. In his first game, on the road against the Cleveland Indians, he was the starting center fielder and batted third in the St. Louis lineup. He struck out against Cleveland starter Steve Gromek in the first inning, then was replaced by fellow rookie Jay Porter two innings later. Crawford started two more games and appeared as a defensive replacement or pinch hitter in three others during his MLB trial. His two hits (in 11 at bats) included a double, but he struck out five times and was not credited with a run batted in.

Crawford was traded to the Detroit Tigers on October 27, 1952, but would never again appear in a major league game. His professional career ended in 1957 after nine seasons.

Crawford was a member of the U.S. Air Force, and after his baseball career, he worked for the Fort Worth Police Department. He died on October 21, 2008.
