= Given Owens House =

House in Missouri

- U.S. National Register of Historic Places
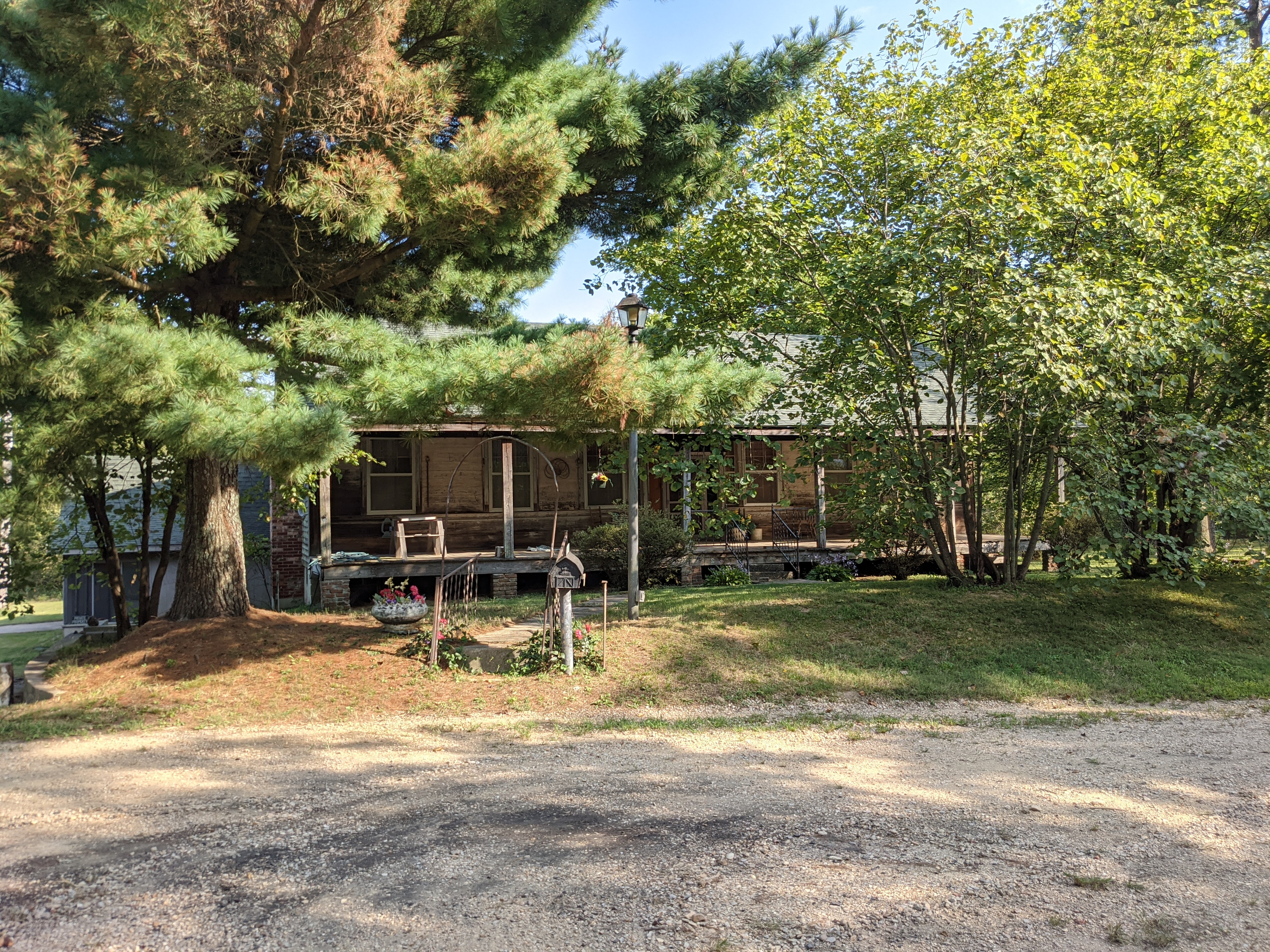

- Location within Missouri Location within the United States
- Location: Off Route 53, near Campbell, Missouri
- Coordinates: 36°30′30″N 90°6′25″W
- Area: 1 acre (0.40 ha)
- Built: 1860
- Built by: Taylor, Leander J.
- Architectural style: Louisiana Tidewater
- NRHP reference No.: 83000987
- Added to NRHP: March 29, 1983

Given Owens House, also known as the Donald Hughes Home, is a historic home located near Campbell, Missouri. It was built in 1860 in the Louisiana Tidewater architectural style. It is a one-story frame dwelling constructed of native Cyprus and poplar lumber. It features a full-width verandah. Also on the property is a contributing barn.

It was listed on the National Register of Historic Places in 1983.
