= Dillman, Missouri =

Unincorporated community in Dunklin County, Missouri

Coordinates: 36°11′05″N 90°06′17″W

Dillman is an unincorporated community in Dunklin County, in the U.S. state of Missouri.

The community was named after Frank Dillman, a businessperson in the lumber industry.
