= Salem Township, Dunklin County, Missouri =

Township in the U.S. state of Missouri

Coordinates: 36.1083°N 90.1856°W

Salem Township is a township in Dunklin County, in the U.S. state of Missouri.

Salem Township was established in 1845, and most likely was named after Salem, Massachusetts. The two biggest cities in the township are Senath and Arbyrd.
