= Vincit, Missouri =

Unincorporated community in Dunklin County, Missouri

Coordinates: 36°09′57″N 90°04′09″W

Vincit is an unincorporated community in Dunklin County, in the U.S. state of Missouri.

== History ==
A post office called Vincit was established in 1880, and remained in operation until 1909. The origin of the name Vincit is uncertain.
