= Hargrove, Missouri =

Unincorporated community in Missouri, US

Coordinates: 36°03′57″N 90°19′13″W

Hargrove is an unincorporated community in Dunklin County, in the U.S. state of Missouri.

The community has the name of Bob Hargrove, a railroad official.
