= Charles and Bettie Birthright =

African American community leaders in Clarkton, Missouri

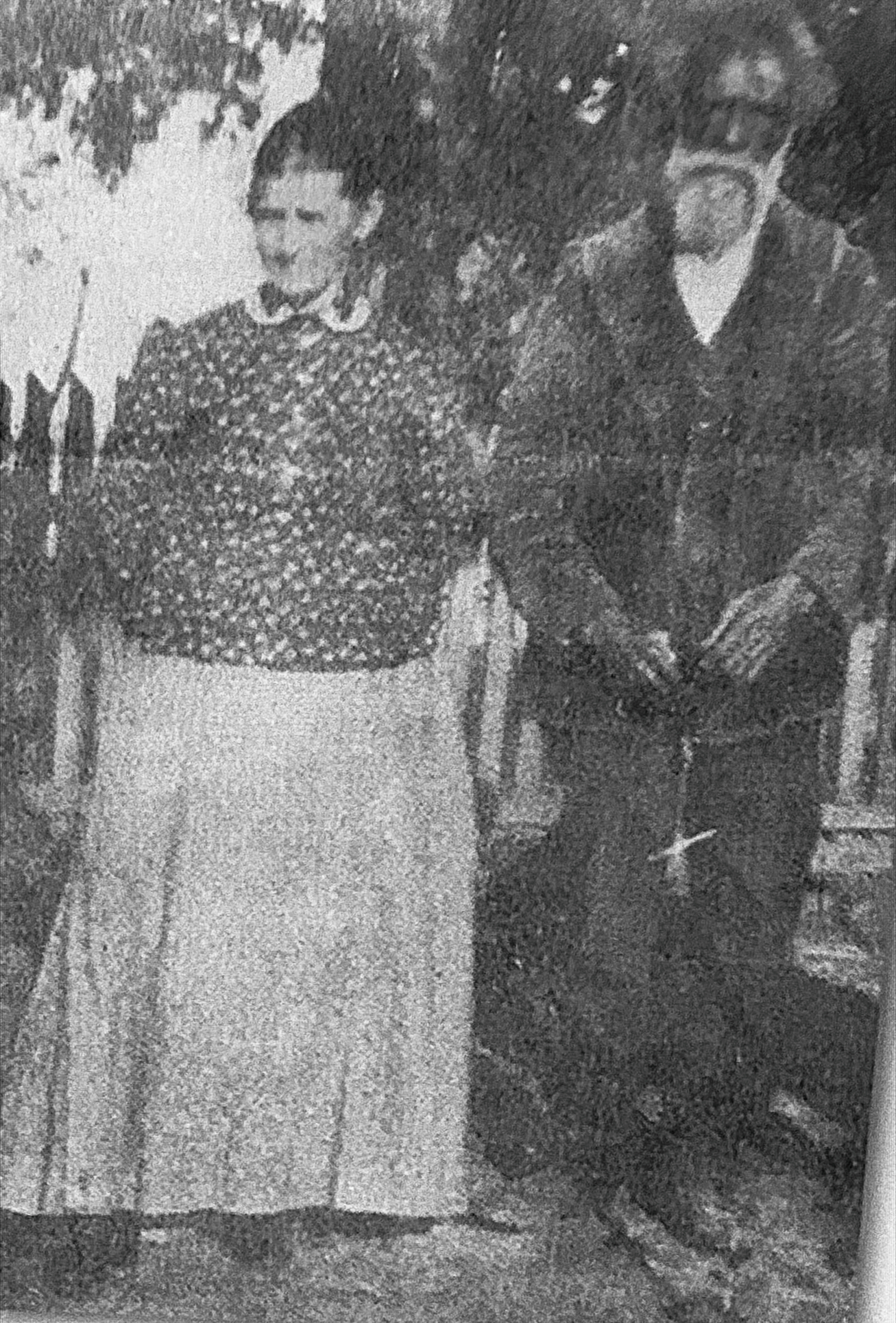
Bettie and Charles Birthright, c. 1900

Charles and Bettie Birthright were an African American married couple who lived in Clarkton, Dunklin County, Missouri, United States, who became philanthropists. Born into slavery and freed after the Civil War, they became landowners and community figures in Dunkling County. They supported local institutions, including funding for school buildings. Through a bequest made in 1893, their estate was left to the Tuscaloosa Institute (later Stillman Institute, now Stillman College), where it became one of the largest contributions in the institution's history. They are associated with the Charles and Bettie Birthright House, which is listed on the National Register of Historic Places.

== Early years ==
Charles Birthright was born into slavery in 1833 in Tennessee. As a young man, he was assigned as a personal servant to Jack Birthright and was brought west to Missouri before the Civil War. He learned the trade of barbering and later worked for many years as a barber in Clarkton.

Bettie Scott was born into slavery in 1840 in Virginia. As a young girl, she was assigned as a maid to Sallie, the daughter of Bettie's enslaver. As part of her responsibilities, she accompanied Sallie to a Catholic boarding school in Richmond, Virginia. In 1853, after Sallie's education was completed, she married David Young Pankey. Bettie moved west with the Pankey household to Missouri in 1858.

== Marriage and family ==
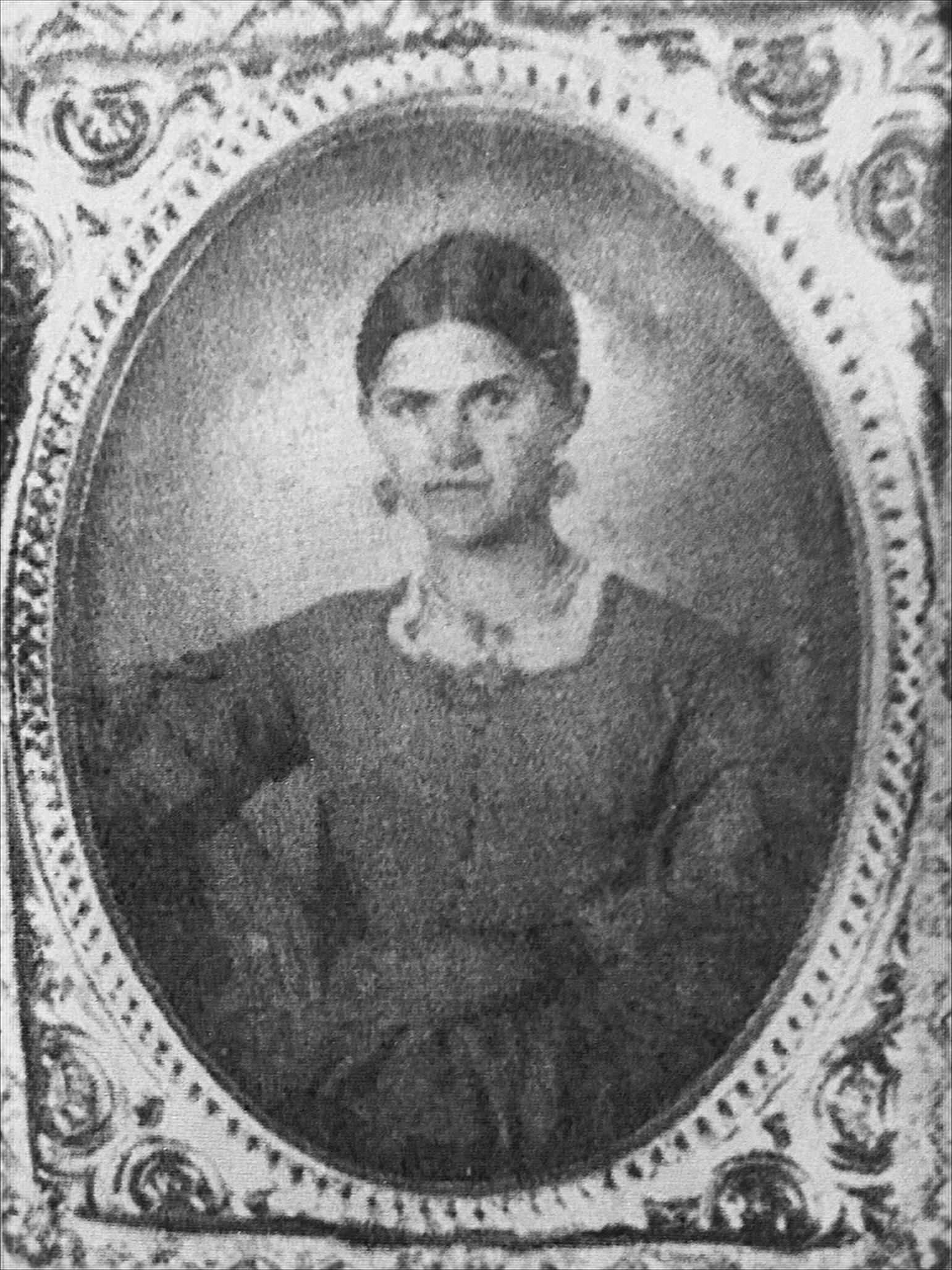
Bettie Scott Birthright, c. 1865

Charles and Bettie became acquainted when their respective owners moved to southeast Missouri in the late 1850s. They were permitted to marry on September 29, 1860, but did not live together until after the Civil War, in part due to wartime circumstances affecting Bettie's enslaver. They had one child, Sterling Price Birthright, named for the Confederate general Sterling Price, who commanded forces in Missouri during the Civil War. Their son died on January 24, 1864.

In later years, Charles and Bettie Birthright told friends that their experiences in slavery differed from those of individuals who labored in the fields or mills, though they emphasized the lack of personal freedom and control over their lives.

=== Personal letters ===
A series of letters exchanged between Charles and Bettie Birthright, preserved in the Dunklin County Museum and donated in the 1970s by Carey Pankey Williams, a descendant of the Pankey family, provide insight into their relationship and the constraints they faced while enslaved. The correspondence documents efforts to bring the couple together, including a proposal by Charles's enslaver to either sell him or purchase Bettie so they could live in the same household, an arrangement that was refused. Charles wrote that he was “as valuable a Negro as they would find,” reflecting the negotiations surrounding their separation.

The letters also highlight the risk of separation and the limited control they had over their lives. In one letter, Bettie's mother expressed concern that marriage might result in permanent separation, noting that the family was attempting to purchase her freedom. Writing in 1861, Charles conveyed the emotional strain of separation, stating that he feared he would be “no account” if they remained apart.

== Life and work in Missouri ==
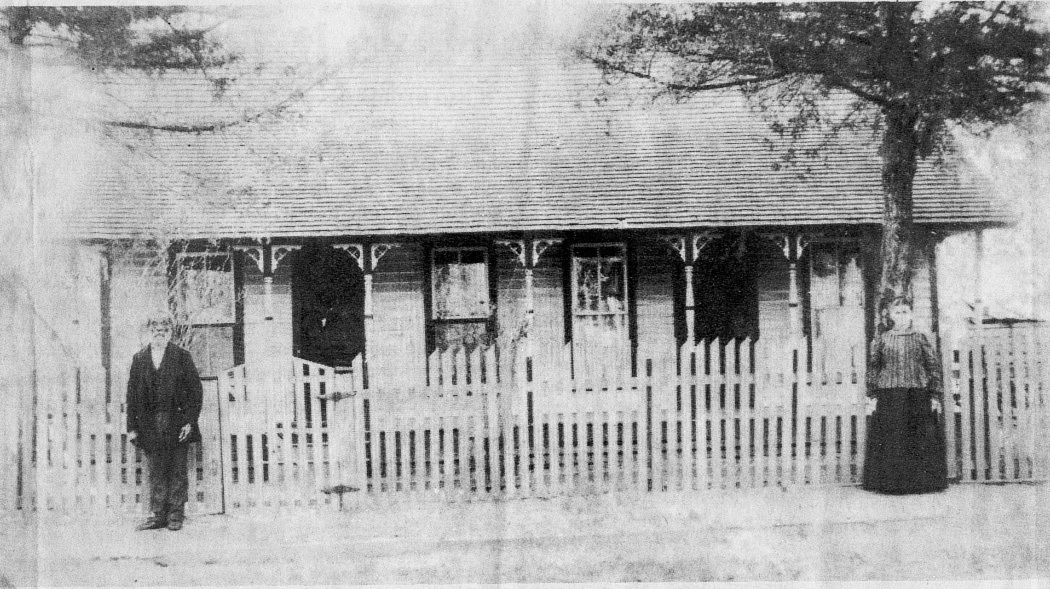
Charles and Bettie Birthright at home, c. 1910.

After they were freed, Charles and Bettie settled in Clarkton, Missouri. He worked as a barber, and she worked as a seamstress and cook, and they both farmed. Over time, they began acquiring land and eventually accumulated more than 400 acres. As the town of Clarkton grew, the value of their property increased. The couple had no surviving children. They contributed funds for the construction of school buildings in Clarkton in 1884 and 1911.

Bettie managed her own business affairs and, in 1915, wrote to Hugh Pankey reminding him to pay her business taxes before the books closed. She also worked as a pastry cook, making wedding cakes in Dunklin County for many years. Her culinary skills may have been shaped in part by her mother, Anne Scott, who worked as a pastry cook at Hollins Institute and at nearby resorts. Charles was a fiddler and performed at social gatherings throughout his life.

Charles and Bettie Birthright were described as deeply religious and interested in supporting the education of African Americans in the South. In 1893, Charles executed a will leaving his property to Bettie, with the provision that, upon her death, their real and personal property would be sold and the proceeds donated to the Tuscaloosa Institute in Tuscaloosa, Alabama, for the education of young men for the ministry. Before Charles's death, the Tuscaloosa Institute had been renamed Stillman Institute.

== Estate and legacy ==
Charles died in 1912, and Bettie died on February 1, 1917. After their deaths, the Birthrights’ property passed to the Tuscaloosa Institute (now Stillman College), where it was reported to be the institution's largest single contribution until the 1980s. A campus building, Birthright Auditorium, is named in their honor. Their contributions included support for education and local institutions in Clarkton and Dunklin County.

The Birthright estate became the subject of legal disputes involving heirs and Stillman Institute, which ultimately received the bequest.

Their home at 106 S. Main Street in Clarkton was listed on the National Register of Historic Places in 2009.
