= Marlow, Missouri =

Unincorporated community in Dunklin County, Missouri

Coordinates: 36°23′23″N 89°58′44″W

Marlow is an unincorporated community in Dunklin County, in the U.S. state of Missouri.

The community has the name of James and Toby Marlow, original owners of the site.
