= Independence Township, Dunklin County, Missouri =

Township in the U.S. state of Missouri

Coordinates: 36.236253°N 90.038386°W

Independence Township is a township in Dunklin County, in the U.S. state of Missouri.

Independence Township was erected in 1845.
