= Providence, Dunklin County, Missouri =

Unincorporated community in Missouri, U.S.

Coordinates: 36°30′59″N 89°58′18″W

Providence is an unincorporated community in Dunklin County, in the U.S. state of Missouri.

Providence was founded ca. 1836, and named after a local Baptist church of the same name.
