= Buck Donic, Missouri =

Unincorporated community in Missouri, U.S.

Coordinates: 36°02′23″N 90°19′33″W

Buck Donic is an unincorporated community in Dunklin County, in the U.S. state of Missouri.

== History ==
Buck Donic is a name said to be derived from regional dialect meaning "beach tree among the rocks".
