= Baird, Missouri =

Unincorporated community in Missouri, U.S.

Coordinates: 36°26′51″N 90°00′13″W

Baird is an unincorporated community in Dunklin County, in the U.S. state of Missouri.

Baird was founded c. 1910, taking its name from Martin V. Baird, the proprietor of a local sawmill.
