= Nesbit, Missouri =

Unincorporated community in Dunklin County, Missouri

Coordinates: 36°05′25″N 90°08′05″W

Nesbit is an unincorporated community in Dunklin County, in the U.S. state of Missouri.

== History ==
A post office called Nesbit was established in 1887, and remained in operation until 1905. A local merchant named the community after the Nesbit, McKay and Company.
