= Cotton Hill Township, Dunklin County, Missouri =

Township in Missouri, U.S.

Coordinates: 36.5629970°N 89.9944451°W

Cotton Hill Township is a township in Dunklin County, in the U.S. state of Missouri.

Cotton Hill Township was established in 1845, and named for a trading center within its borders.
