= KMIS (AM) =

KMIS and KMIS-FM
KMIS: Portageville, Missouri; KMIS-FM: Gideon, Missouri; United States
- Frequencies: KMIS: 1050 kHz; KMIS-FM: 103.9 MHz
- Branding: Sports Radio 1050 & 103.9

Programming
- Language(s): English
- Format: Sports
- Affiliations: Fox Sports Radio, Premiere Networks

Ownership
- Owner: Pollack Broadcasting Co.
- Sister stations: KBOA, KBOA-FM, KCRV, KCRV-FM, KTMO, KMIS-FM, WGCQ

History
- First air date: KMIS: September 1, 1960
- Call sign meaning: Missouri

Technical information
- Licensing authority: FCC
- Facility ID: KMIS: 48550; KMIS-FM: 164227
- Class: KMIS: D; KMIS-FM: A
- Power: KMIS: 600 watts (day only)
- ERP: KMIS-FM: 2,500 watts (FM)
- HAAT: KMIS-FM: 122 meters (400 ft) (FM)
- Transmitter coordinates: KMIS: 36°25′31.2″N 89°41′29.3″W; KMIS-FM: 36°25′31.2″N 89°41′29.3″W

Links
- Public license information: KMIS: Public file; LMS; KMIS-FM: Public file; LMS
- Webcast: Listen live
- Website: kmisradio.com

KMIS (1050 kHz, "Sports Radio 1050 & 103.9") is an American AM radio station licensed to serve the community of Portageville, Missouri. The station's broadcast license is held by Pollack Broadcasting Company.

KMIS operates as a daytime-only broadcaster to prevent skywave interference with clear-channel stations WEPN in New York City, KTCT in San Mateo, California, and XEG-AM in Guadalupe, Nuevo León, Mexico. The station broadcasts a sports format branded "Sports Radio 1050" as an affiliate of Fox Sports Radio. Syndicated programming includes The Dan Patrick Show and The Jim Rome Show from Premiere Networks.

The station was assigned the call sign "KMIS" by the Federal Communications Commission (FCC).

Logo before FM sign on

Sports Radio 1050 is simulcast on sister station 103.9 FM KMIS-FM.
