= Cockrum, Missouri =

Unincorporated community in Dunklin County, Missouri

Coordinates: 36°00′40″N 90°20′17″W

Cockrum is an unincorporated community in Dunklin County, in the U.S. state of Missouri.

== History ==
A post office called Cockrum was established in 1886, and remained in operation until 1895. The community has the name of J. C. Cockrum, an original owner of the site.
