= Holcomb Township, Dunklin County, Missouri =

Township in the U.S. state of Missouri

Coordinates: 36.3954018°N 90.0504206°W

Holcomb Township is a township in Dunklin County, in the U.S. state of Missouri.

Holcomb Township was originally called Holcomb Island Township, and under the latter name was organized in 1845.
