= Okta (disambiguation) =

An okta is a unit for measuring cloud cover.

Okta may also refer to:

- OKTA, a Macedonian oil company
- Okta, Inc., an American identity management company
- Okta (album), a 2020 album by the band Keiino
- Okta (restaurant), a restaurant in McMinnville, Oregon

== See also ==
- Octa (disambiguation)
