= Wilhelmina, Missouri =

Unincorporated community in Dunklin County, Missouri

Coordinates: 36°30′53″N 90°10′57″W

Wilhelmina is an unincorporated community in Dunklin County, in the U.S. state of Missouri.

== History ==
A post office called Wilhelmina was established in 1911, and remained in operation until 1957. The community was named in honor of Wilhelmina of the Netherlands (1880–1962), Queen of the Netherlands from 1890 to 1948.
