= Frisbee, Missouri =

- Census-Designated Place
- Interactive map of Frisbee, Missouri
- Coordinates: 36°21′00″N 90°01′43″W
- Country: United States
- State: Missouri
- County: Dunklin

Area
  - Total: 0.80 sq mi (2.07 km^{2})
  - Land: 0.80 sq mi (2.07 km^{2})
  - Water: 0 sq mi (0.00 km^{2})
- Elevation: 276 ft (84 m)

Population (2020)
  - Total: 107
  - Density: 133.8/sq mi (51.65/km^{2})
- FIPS code: 29-26020
- GNIS feature ID: 2806396

Frisbee is an unincorporated community and Census-designated place in Dunklin County, in the U.S. state of Missouri. As of the 2020 census, Frisbee had a population of 107.

== History ==
A variant name was "Manley". A post office called Frisbee was established in 1907, the name was changed to Manley in 1908, and the post office closed in 1918. The present name is apparently after one Mr. Frisbee, a railroad worker.

== Demographics ==
Historical population
Census	Pop.	Note	%±
2020	107		—
U.S. Decennial Census

Frisbee first appeared as a census designated place in the 2020 U.S. census.

== Education ==
It is in the Holcomb R-III School District.
