= Union Township, Dunklin County, Missouri =

Township in Dunklin County, Missouri, U.S.

Coordinates: 36.54°N 90.12°W

Union Township is a township in Dunklin County, in the U.S. state of Missouri.

Union Township was founded in 1845.
