= Valley Ridge, Missouri =

Unincorporated community in Dunklin County, Missouri

Coordinates: 36°33′53″N 90°05′01″W

Valley Ridge is an unincorporated community in Dunklin County, in the U.S. state of Missouri.

== History ==
A post office called Valley Ridge was established in 1878, the name was changed to Valleyridge in 1894, and the post office closed in 1908. The community was so named because despite its ridgetop location, the soil is said to be as fertile as if the town site were in a valley.
