= Townley =

Surname

Townley is a surname. Notable people with the surname include:

- A. C. Townley (1880–1959), American political organizer, founder the National Non-Partisan League
- Alvin Townley (born 1975), American author who writes about adventure with a greater purpose
- Athol Townley (1905–1963), Australian politician and Minister for Defence
- Ben Townley (born 1984), professional motocross rider originating from Taupo, New Zealand
- Charles Townley (1737–1805), English country gentleman, antiquary and collector of the Townley Marbles
- Charles Townley (officer of arms) (1713–1774), long-serving officer of arms at the College of Arms in London
- Doody Townley (born 1925), driver of standardbred racehorses in New Zealand
- Fred Townley, architect who designed many buildings in Vancouver, Canada
- Frederick Townley-Smith (1887–1961), Co-operative Commonwealth Federation member of the Canadian House of Commons
- George Townley (1891–1977), the sixth Bishop of Hull in the modern era from 1957 until 1965
- Henry Townley Heald (1904–1975), president of Armour Institute of Technology from 1938 to 1940
- Jack Townley (1897–1960), American screenwriter
- James Townley (1714–1778), English dramatist and anonymous playwright
- Jimmy Townley (1902–1983), English professional footballer
- John Townley (born 1945), musician who was a member of the folk-rock group The Magicians from 1965 to 1966
- John Wes Townley (born 1989), former NASCAR Nationwide Series driver
- Jonathan Townley Crane (1819–1880), American clergyman, author and abolitionist
- Mary Townley (architect) née Gosling (1753–1839), one of England's earliest female architects.
- Max Townley (1864–1942), British land agent, agriculturist and politician
- Michael Townley, US citizen living in the United States under terms of the federal witness protection program
- Michael Townley (politician) (born 1934), former Tasmanian senator
- Rex Townley (1904–1982), Australian politician who served as leader of the Liberal Party in Tasmania from 1950 to 1956
- Richard Greaves Townley (1786–1855), English Whig politician
- Richard Townley (died 1711), the 8th son of Nicholas Townley of Littleton and Joanne White
- Robert Townley Caldwell, the Master of Corpus Christi College, Cambridge from 1906 to 1914
- Roderick Townley (born 1942), American author of juvenile, young adult, and adult books
- Sidney Dean Townley (1867–1946), American astronomer and geodeticist
- Simon Townley, piano player and composer
- Thomas Townley (1862–1935), Canadian lawyer and the eighth Mayor of Vancouver, British Columbia
- Thomas Townley (cricketer) (1825–1895), English soldier, cricketer and amateur jockey
- Toke Townley, (1912–1984), English actor
- Sir Walter Townley (1863–1945), British ambassador
- William Townley, (1866–1950), English football (soccer) player and coach
- William Townley Mitford (1817–1889), Victorian Conservative Party politician in Britain
- Winfield Townley Scott (1910–1968), American poet, critic and diarist

== See also ==
- Towneley family
