= KCRV (AM) =

- Caruthersville, Missouri; United States
- Frequency: 1,370 kilohertz (219 m)
- Branding: "Classic Country 1370 KCRV"

Programming
- Format: Country

Ownership
- Owner: Pollack Broadcasting Co.
- Sister stations: KBOA, KBOA-FM, KCRV-FM, KMIS, KTMO

History
- First air date: 1950
- Call sign meaning: CaRuthersVille

Technical information
- Licensing authority: FCC
- Facility ID: 53976
- Class: D
- Power: 1,000 watts day 63 watts night
- Transmitter coordinates: 36°12′50″N 89°41′25″W

Links
- Public license information: Public file; LMS
- Website: www.kcrvradio.com/kcrv-am-1370.html

KCRV (1370 AM) is a radio station broadcasting a Country music format. Licensed to Caruthersville, Missouri, United States. The station is currently owned by Pollack Broadcasting Co.
