= KAHR =

- Poplar Bluff, Missouri; United States
- Frequency: 96.7 MHz
- Branding: Sam 96.7

Programming
- Format: Adult hits
- Affiliations: ABC Radio

Ownership
- Owner: Eagle Bluff Enterprises
- Sister stations: KFEB, KOEA, KPPL, KXOQ

History
- First air date: 1985; 41 years ago
- Former call signs: KXOQ (1985–1987)

Technical information
- Licensing authority: FCC
- Facility ID: 18045
- Class: A
- ERP: 6,000 watts
- HAAT: 100 meters (330 ft)

Links
- Public license information: Public file; LMS
- Website: www.foxradionetwork.com/sam/

KAHR (96.7 FM) is a radio station broadcasting an Adult Hits format. It is licensed to Poplar Bluff, Missouri, United States. The station is currently owned by Eagle Bluff Enterprises and features programming from ABC Radio.

== History ==
The station went on the air as KXOQ on 16 January 1985. On 23 November 1987, it changed its call sign to the current KAHR.
