= Townley, Missouri =

Unincorporated community in Dunklin County, Missouri

Coordinates: 36°37′00″N 89°58′11″W

Townley is an unincorporated community in Dunklin County, in the U.S. state of Missouri.

== History ==
A post office called Townley was established in 1905, and remained in operation until 1919. The community was named after one Mr. Townly, a businessperson in the lumber industry.
