= Sumach, Missouri =

Unincorporated community in Dunklin County, Missouri

Coordinates: 36°19′26″N 89°59′29″W

Sumach is an unincorporated community in Dunklin County, in the U.S. state of Missouri.

== History ==
A post office called Sumack was established in 1889, and remained in operation until 1896. The community was so named on account of the sumach near the original town site.
