= Cotton Plant, Missouri =

Unincorporated community in Dunklin County, Missouri

Coordinates: 36°05′24″N 90°05′28″W

Cotton Plant is an unincorporated community in Dunklin County, in the U.S. state of Missouri.

== History ==
A post office was established at Cotton Plant in 1875. The community was most likely named due to its role as a shipping point for cotton.
