= Onie Wheeler =

American singer-songwriter

Onie Wheeler (November 10, 1921 – May 26, 1984) was an American rockabilly, gospel, country and bluegrass musician.

Wheeler was born in Senath, Missouri, United States, to a cotton sharecropping family in the Mississippi River Bootheel of Southeast Missouri, and he learned to play guitar and harmonica and do a 'train whistle' with his mouth as a child. He joined the US Army at age 18, and was stationed in Pearl Harbor when it was attacked by the Japanese. After serving in World War II, he started working in radio, appearing on stations in Missouri, Arkansas, Michigan, and Kentucky. In 1950, he formed The Ozark Cowboys, along with Ernest Thompson, A.J. Nelson, and Doyle Nelson.

The Ozark Cowboys went to Nashville in 1953 and signed to Columbia Records. Their initial releases were not hits, though Lefty Frizzell took the Wheeler-penned "Run 'Em Off" to the Top Ten of the U.S. country chart.

Wheeler signed as a solo artist to Sun Records in 1957 and went on tour with headliner Hank Snow, and Faron Young, the Wilburn Brothers, Mother Maybelle & the Carter Sisters, Slim Whitman, Jerry Lee Lewis, Johnny Cash, Elvis Presley, and Carl Perkins. After a short time living in California, he returned to Missouri. He moved up north to Sherman, Missouri, outside of St Louis, for a short time, playing honky-tonks while holding a job before moving to Nashville in 1962, and joining Roy Acuff's band, touring Vietnam for US military and the Grand Ole Opry.

His biggest success was the 1973 hit "John's Been Shucking My Corn", though the achievements of his daughter Karen Wheeler would eclipse his own in the decade. He had a hit — "Go Home". He played on OKeh Records, and was a studio musician for such groups as the gospel duo, Slim & Zella Mae Cox. He bought a guitar shop in Nashville in the late 1970s, and played at the Grand Ole Opry, as a member of Roy Acuff's Smoky Mountain Boys band, from 1962 until his death. Wheeler was onstage playing for a taping of the Rev. Jimmie Snow's Grand Ole Gospel Radio Show in 1984 when he collapsed and died of a heart attack while standing in the Circle.

== Discography ==
Year	Title	Label
1954	"Would You Like To Wear A Crown" / "I Saw Mother With God Last Night"	Okeh Records 18058-s (78) / 4-28058-s (45)
1955	"Little Mama" / "She Wiggled and Giggled"	Columbia Records
1956	"I Wanna Hold My Baby" / "Onie's Bop"	Columbia Records 4-21523
1956	"A Booger Gonna Getcha" / "A Beggar For Your Love"	Columbia Records 4-40787
1957	"'Goin' Back To The City" / "Steppin' Out"	Columbia Records
1959	"Tell 'Em Off" / "Jump Right Out Of This Jukebox"	Sun Records
1960	"Too Hot To Handle" / "I Need To Go Home"	K-Ark Records/Scottie Records
1961	"You're Getting All Over Me" / "All Day, All Night, All Wast"	K-Ark Records
1961	"White Lightning Cherokee" / "My Stubborn Heart"	K-Ark Records
1973	"John's Been Shucking My Corn" / "Make 'Em All Go Home"	Royal American RA-76
	"Bonaparte's Retreat"; "Hazel"; "I'll Love You For A Life Time"; "Long Gone"; "That's All"; "Walkin' Shoes" (1957)	Sun Records (not released)
