= KOEA =

- Doniphan, Missouri; United States
- Broadcast area: Poplar Bluff, Missouri; Pocahontas, Arkansas
- Branding: The Storm 97.5

Programming
- Format: Country

Ownership
- Owner: Eagle Bluff Enterprises
- Sister stations: KAHR, KFEB, KPPL, KXOQ

History
- Call sign meaning: K-Ozark-Electric-Authority

Technical information
- Licensing authority: FCC
- Facility ID: 29624
- Class: C2
- ERP: 40,000 watts
- HAAT: 176.0 meters (577.4 ft)
- Translator: 94.1FM (K231BM)

Links
- Public license information: Public file; LMS

KOEA (97.5 FM) is a radio station broadcasting a Country music format. Licensed to Doniphan, Missouri, United States. The station is currently owned by Eagle Bluff Enterprises.
