= Mikhail Novitsky =

Russian musician (born 1963)

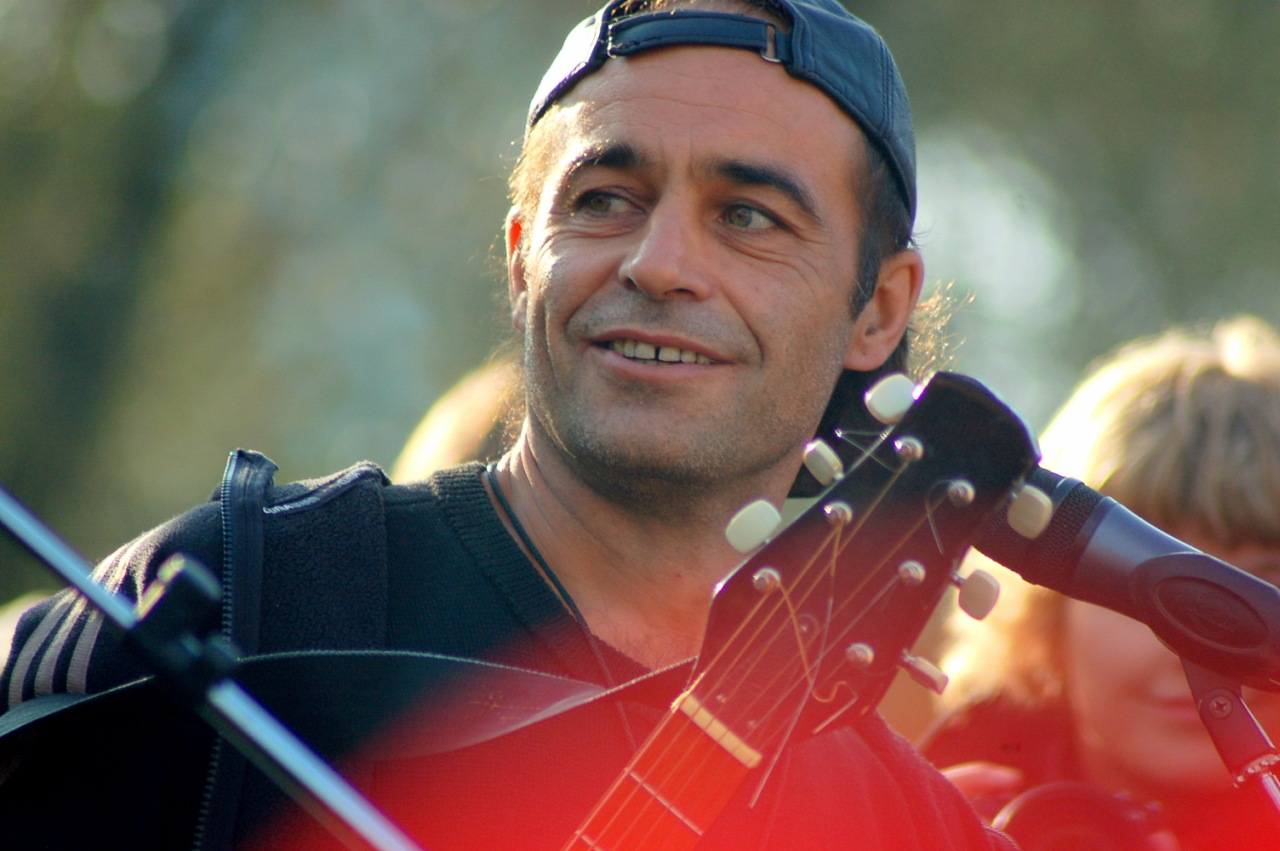

Background information
- Born: Mikhail Valentinovich Novitsky; 17 December 1963 (age 62); Brailiv, Zhmerynka Raion, Vinnytsia Oblast, Ukrainian Soviet Socialist Republic, Soviet Union
- Genres: Rock
- Instrument: Acoustic Guitar
- Website: Mikhail Novitsky on Facebook

Mikhail Valentinovich Novitsky (Russian: Михаил Валентинович Новицкий; born 17 December 1963) is a Russian actor, singer/songwriter and guitarist, who fronts the rock band "SP Babai " (Saint Petersburg), which he formed in 1993 from the remnants of his first band, "Avtobus". He is also the organizer of the Vladimir Vysotsky singer-songwriter festival "Lampushka" since 2001. Apart from music, he is an active member of his preservationist group "Green Wave", which he set up to protect St. Petersburg parks and lakes.

== Discography ==
- 1996 — «Free flight».
- 1997 — «With a badge in the head.».
- 1999 — «Flying star».
- 2000 — «SP Babai the Best».
- 2001 — «Lyrical album».
- 2002 — «Tale about King Arlis».
- 2002 — «Whack in the heart».
- 2003 — «Stebalovo».
- 2004 — «The main song about the different».
- 2007 — «In the middle of life».
- 2007 — «Our Vysotsky» (concert-performance, DVD + Book).

== Participation in Russian political protest movement ==
Mikhail Novitsky is a regular participant of the protest movement in Russia. From the middle of the zero's he constantly played at meetings of the democratic opposition in St. Petersburg, where he performed critical songs of his own devoted to the Russian authorities, especially Russian President Vladimir Putin. His song “Putin, skiing, Magadan” in recent years has become the unofficial anthem of the protest movement in St. Petersburg. Putin's regime cancels his concerts in Russia regularly because of irreconcilable political position of Mikhail Novitsky.

== See also ==
- In St. Petersburg Vysotsky Birthday prepared to do the impossible, January 25, 2006
- St. Peterburg remembers Vladidmir Vysotsky, Russkiy Mir Foundation, 22.07.2010
- Free Pussy Riot Fest A Success in St. Petersburg, The Moscow Times, September 13, 2012, by Sergei Chernov
