= White Oak, Missouri =

- Census-Designated Place
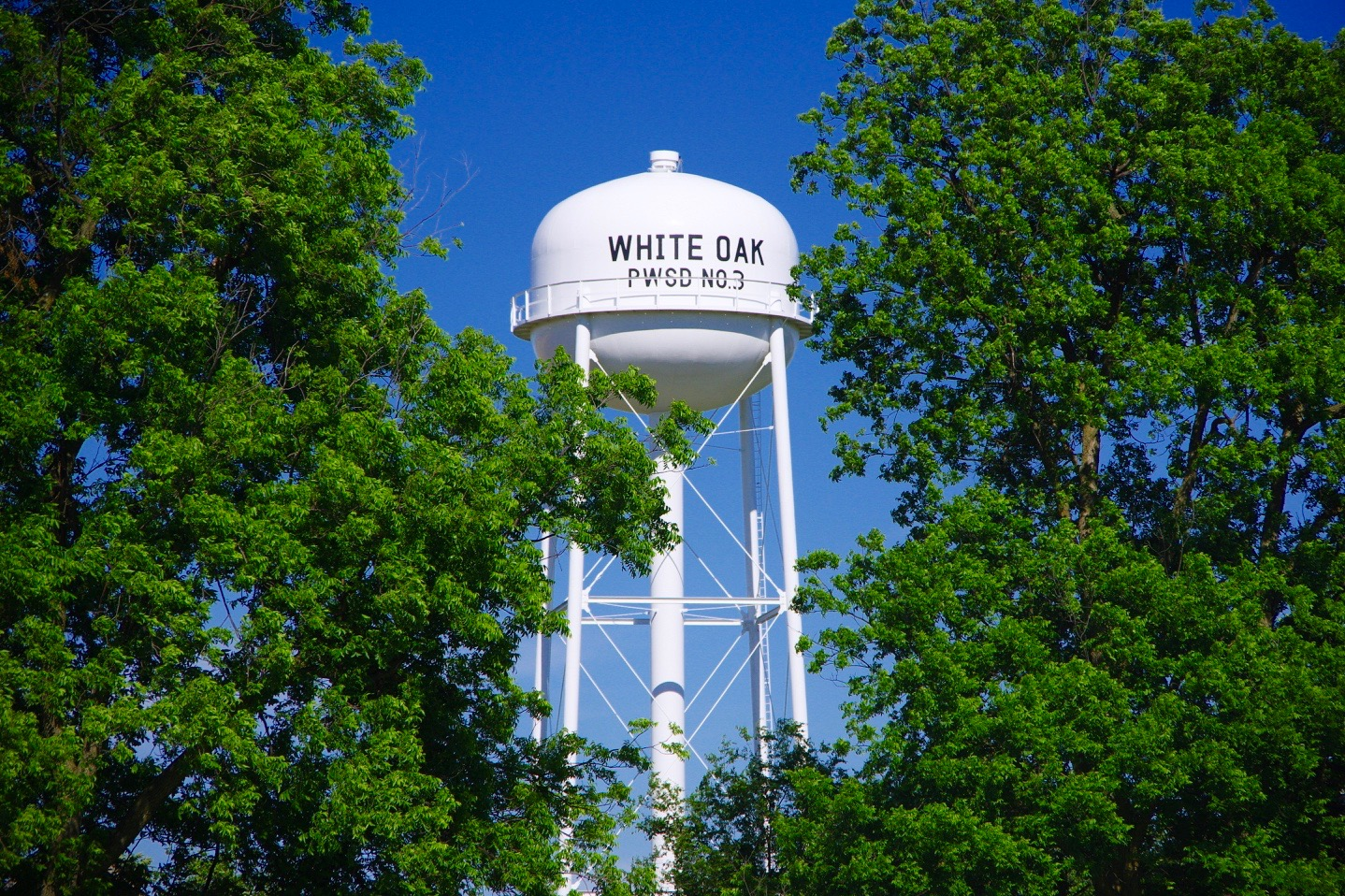
- Water tower in White Oak

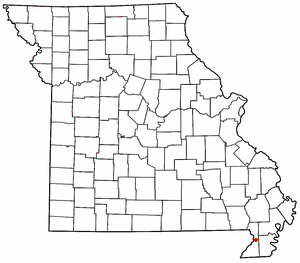
- Location of White Oak in Missouri
- Coordinates: 36°19′48″N 90°01′39″W
- Country: United States
- State: Missouri
- County: Dunklin

Area
  - Total: 0.13 sq mi (0.33 km^{2})
  - Land: 0.13 sq mi (0.33 km^{2})
  - Water: 0 sq mi (0.00 km^{2})
- Elevation: 272 ft (83 m)

Population (2020)
  - Total: 101
  - Density: 802.3/sq mi (309.76/km^{2})
- FIPS code: 29-79468
- GNIS feature ID: 2806398

White Oak is an unincorporated community in Dunklin County, Missouri, United States. It is located on Route 25, approximately five miles north of Kennett.

As of the 2020 census, White Oak had a population of 101.

A post office called White Oak was established in 1891, and the name was changed to Whiteoak in 1895. The community was named for a grove of white oak trees near the original town site.

== Demographics ==
Historical population
Census	Pop.	Note	%±
2020	101		—
U.S. Decennial Census

== Education ==
It is in the Holcomb R-III School District.
