= KTMO (FM) =

- New Madrid, Missouri; United States
- Broadcast area: Kennett, Missouri; Northwest Tennessee; Fulton County, Kentucky
- Frequency: 106.5 MHz
- Branding: The Wolf

Programming
- Format: Country music

Ownership
- Owner: Pollack Broadcasting Co.
- Sister stations: KBOA-FM, KBOA, KCRV-FM, KCRV-AM, KMIS, WGCQ

Technical information
- Licensing authority: FCC
- Facility ID: 48549
- Class: C2
- ERP: 50,000 watts
- HAAT: 143 meters (469 ft)
- Transmitter coordinates: 36°25′32″N 89°41′30″W

Links
- Public license information: Public file; LMS
- Webcast: Listen live
- Website: http://ktmoradio.com

KTMO is a radio station airing a country music format licensed to New Madrid, Missouri, broadcasting on 106.5 FM. The station is owned by Pollack Broadcasting Co.
