= Octa, Missouri =

Unincorporated community in Dunklin County, Missouri

Coordinates: 36°10′16″N 90°07′23″W

Octa is an unincorporated community in Dunklin County, in the U.S. state of Missouri.

== History ==
A post office called Octa was established in 1903, and remained in operation until 1908. The origin of the name Octa is obscure.
