= KFEB =

- Campbell, Missouri; United States
- Broadcast area: Kennett, Missouri
- Branding: The Pulse 107.5 Hits Now

Programming
- Format: Pop Contemporary Hit Radio
- Affiliations: Dial Global

Ownership
- Owner: Eagle Bluff Enterprises
- Sister stations: KAHR, KOEA, KPPL, KXOQ

History
- Former call signs: KAVY (1997–1998)

Technical information
- Licensing authority: FCC
- Facility ID: 76532
- Class: C3
- ERP: 17,500 watts
- HAAT: 119 meters (390 ft)

Links
- Public license information: Public file; LMS
- Website: www.foxradionetwork.com/thepulse/

KFEB (107.5 FM, "The Pulse 107.5 Hits Now") is a radio station broadcasting a pop contemporary hit radio music format. Licensed to Campbell, Missouri, United States, the station is currently owned by Eagle Bluff Enterprises and features programming from Westwood One.

== History ==
The Federal Communications Commission issued a construction permit for the station on May 14, 1997. The station was assigned the call sign KAVY on June 27, 1997, and on March 27, 1998, changed its call sign to the current KFEB. On April 14, 1999, the station received its license to cover. The station has been silent since January 27, 2009.
