= KPPL =

- Poplar Bluff, Missouri; United States
- Broadcast area: Poplar Bluff, Missouri
- Frequency: 92.5 MHz
- Branding: 92.5 The Eagle

Programming
- Format: Country

Ownership
- Owner: Eagle Bluff Enterprises
- Sister stations: KAHR, KFEB, KOEA, KXOQ

Technical information
- Licensing authority: FCC
- Facility ID: 87462
- Class: C3
- ERP: 25,000 watts
- HAAT: 100.0 meters (328.1 ft)

Links
- Public license information: Public file; LMS
- Website: www.foxradionetwork.com/theeagle/

KPPL (92.5 FM) is a radio station broadcasting a Country music format. Licensed to Poplar Bluff, Missouri, United States. The station is currently owned by Eagle Bluff Enterprises
