= KCRV-FM =

- Caruthersville, Missouri; United States
- Frequency: 105.1 MHz
- Branding: Classic Hits 105.1

Programming
- Format: Classic hits

Ownership
- Owner: Pollack Broadcasting Co.
- Sister stations: KBOA, KBOA-FM, KCRV, KMIS, KTMO

History
- First air date: 1975
- Former call signs: KLOW (1984–2001)

Technical information
- Licensing authority: FCC
- Facility ID: 53977
- Class: A
- ERP: 4,800 watts
- HAAT: 100 meters (330 ft)
- Transmitter coordinates: 36°12′50″N 89°41′25″W

Links
- Public license information: Public file; LMS
- Website: kcrvradio.com

KCRV-FM (105.1 FM) is a radio station licensed to Caruthersville, Missouri, United States. The station is currently owned by Pollack Broadcasting Co.

== History ==
The station was assigned the call letters KCRV-FM on May 19, 1981. On January 2, 1984 the station changed its call sign to KLOW, on March 21, 2003 to the current KCRV-FM.
