= KBOA-FM =

- Piggott, Arkansas; United States
- Frequency: 105.5 MHz
- Branding: Magic 105

Programming
- Format: Hot adult contemporary
- Affiliations: Westwood One

Ownership
- Owner: Pollack Broadcasting Co.
- Sister stations: KBOA, KCRV, KCRV-FM, KMIS, KTMO

History
- First air date: 1983 (as KTEI)
- Former call signs: KTEI (1983–1995)

Technical information
- Licensing authority: FCC
- Facility ID: 33673
- Class: A
- ERP: 6,000 watts
- HAAT: 91 meters
- Transmitter coordinates: 36°19′50″N 90°7′24″W

Links
- Public license information: Public file; LMS
- Webcast: Listen Live
- Website: KBOA-FM Online

KBOA-FM (105.5 FM, "Magic 105") is a radio station broadcasting a hot adult contemporary music format. Licensed to Piggott, Arkansas, United States, the station is currently owned by Pollack Broadcasting Co. and features programming from Westwood One.

== History ==
The station was assigned the call sign KTEI on 1983-01-25. On 1995-04-21, the station changed its call sign to the current KBOA-FM.
