= KXOQ =

KXQQ
- Kennett, Missouri; United States
- Broadcast area: Southeast Missouri, Northeast Arkansas, West Tennessee
- Frequency: 104.3 MHz
- Branding: The Quake

Programming
- Language: English
- Format: Classic rock
- Affiliations: Westwood One

Ownership
- Owner: Steven and Rochelle Fuchs; (Eagle Bluff Enterprises)
- Sister stations: KAHR, KFEB, KOEA, KPPL

History
- Former call signs: KOLW (1995)

Technical information
- Licensing authority: FCC
- Facility ID: 18044
- Class: A
- ERP: 6,000 watts
- HAAT: 100 meters (330 ft)

Links
- Public license information: Public file; LMS

KXOQ (104.3 FM, "The Quake") is an American radio station licensed to serve Kennett, Missouri, United States. The station's broadcast license is held by Eagle Bluff Enterprises, and it operates as part of the Poplar Bluff-based Fox Radio Network.

KXOQ broadcasts a classic rock format with some programming from Westwood One.

== History ==
In July 1993, Eagle Bluff Enterprises applied to the Federal Communications Commission (FCC) for a construction permit for a new broadcast radio station. The FCC granted this permit on March 30, 1994, with a scheduled expiration date of September 30, 1995. The new station was assigned call sign KOLW on June 30, 1995. After construction began, the station was assigned new call sign KXOQ by FCC on November 1, 1995.

In late November 1995, permit holder Eagle Bluff Enterprises agreed to transfer the construction permit to P.M. Broadcasting, Inc. The FCC approved the transfer on February 14, 1996, and the transaction was formally consummated on February 6, 1996. After station construction and testing were completed, KXOQ was granted its broadcast license on April 12, 1996. The station's license was transferred back to Eagle Bluff Enterprises effective September 29, 2020; both entities are owned jointly by Steven and Rochelle Fuchs.
