= KBOA (AM) =

- Kennett, Missouri; United States
- Frequency: 1540 kHz
- Branding: AM 1540 KBOA

Programming
- Format: Adult standards–MOR
- Affiliations: Citadel Media, Music of Your Life

Ownership
- Owner: Pollack Broadcasting Co.
- Sister stations: KBOA-FM, KCRV, KCRV-FM, KMIS, KTMO

History
- First air date: 1965 (as KBXM)
- Former call signs: KBXM (1965–1986); KNNT (1986–1995)

Technical information
- Licensing authority: FCC
- Facility ID: 33674
- Class: D
- Power: 1,000 watts day; 500 watts critical hours; 3 watts night
- Transmitter coordinates: 36°13′30″N 90°4′30″W
- Repeater: 98.7 WGCQ (Hayti)

Links
- Public license information: Public file; LMS
- Website: KBOA Online

KBOA (1540 AM, America's Best Music) is a radio station broadcasting an Adult Standards music format. Licensed to Kennett, Missouri, United States, the station is currently owned by Pollack Broadcasting Co. and features programming from Citadel Media.

AM 1540 KBOA is simulcast on sister station 98.7 FM WGCQ. The location has recently been moved to a site along Southwest Drive.

== History ==
The station was assigned the call sign KNNT on February 1, 1986. On January 19, 1995, the station changed its call sign to the current KBOA.
