= Malden High School (Missouri) =

Location
- 505 Burkhart Street; Malden, Missouri 63863; United States; 36°34′00″N 89°58′22″W

Information
- Type: Public
- Established: 1987
- School district: Malden R-1 School District
- Superintendent: Kenneth Cook
- Teaching staff: 38.00 (on FTE basis)
- Grades: 6 to 12
- Enrollment: 392 (2023-2024)
- Student to teacher ratio: 10.32
- Colors: Green and gold
- Mascot: Green Wave

Malden High School is a public high school located in Malden, Missouri. The school serves about 425 students in grades 6 to 12. It is part of the Malden R-1 School District.

== Sports championships ==
3A School Sports (2A Football) Last State Championship 2007 Track Recent Championships 2011 Class 2 District 1 Baseball
