= Senath, Missouri =

Senath
- City
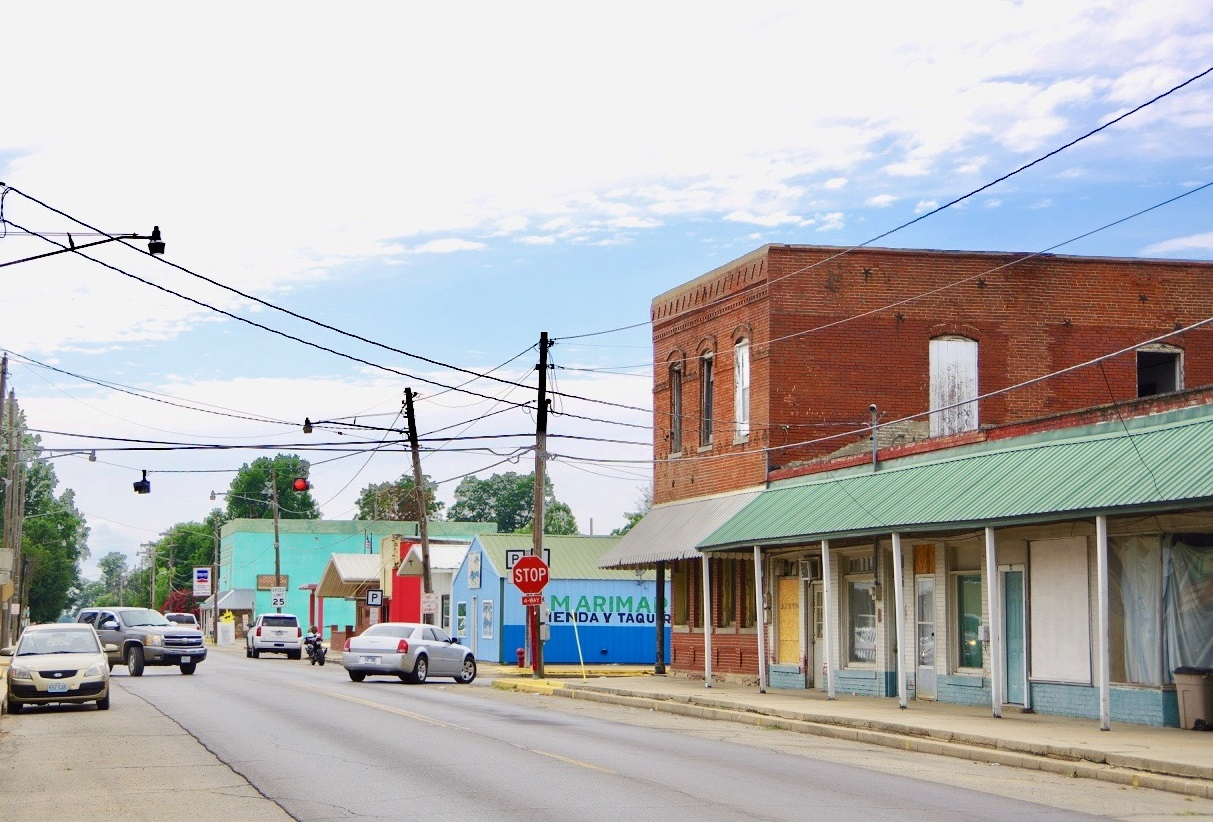
- Commercial Street (State Highway P)
- Motto: Little City With A Big Heart
- Location of Senath, Missouri
- Coordinates: 36°8′0″N 90°9′36″W
- Country: United States
- State: Missouri
- County: Dunklin
- Settled: 1878
- Incorporated: March 10, 1882
- Named for: Asenath Douglass

Area
  - Total: 1.92 sq mi (4.98 km^{2})
  - Land: 1.92 sq mi (4.98 km^{2})
  - Water: 0 sq mi (0.00 km^{2})
- Elevation: 256 ft (78 m)

Population (2020)
  - Total: 1,593
  - Density: 828/sq mi (319.7/km^{2})
- Time zone: UTC-6 (Central (CST))
  - Summer (DST): UTC-5 (CDT)
- ZIP code: 63876
- FIPS code: 29-66638
- GNIS feature ID: 2396573
- Website: www.cityofsenath.com

Senath (/ˈsiːnəθ/ SEE-nəth) is a city in Dunklin County, Missouri, United States. The population was 1,593 at the 2020 census.

== History ==
The city of Senath was first settled by A.W. Douglas, who is believed to have moved into the area in 1878. The city was later founded in 1882. It is named after an early settler, Asenath Douglass, who was commonly called Senath and in whose family her Bible-derived name Asenath was pronounced with a long "e" and with stress on the second syllable. A post office called Senath has been in operation since 1881. In 1897, the St. Louis, Kennett, & Southern Railroad was extended from Kennett south to Senath, giving the city its first rail connection.

== Geography ==
The city lies in the southwestern Bootheel approximately nine miles southwest of Kennett along U.S. Route 412. Senath is served by Missouri supplemental routes A, C and P.

According to the United States Census Bureau, the city has a total area of 1.92 square miles (4.97 km^{2}), all land.

== Demographics ==
Historical population
| Census | Pop. | Note | %± |
|---|---|---|---|
| 1900 | 241 | | — |
| 1910 | 1,029 | | 327.0% |
| 1920 | 1,054 | | 2.4% |
| 1930 | 1,086 | | 3.0% |
| 1940 | 1,261 | | 16.1% |
| 1950 | 1,528 | | 21.2% |
| 1960 | 1,369 | | −10.4% |
| 1970 | 1,484 | | 8.4% |
| 1980 | 1,728 | | 16.4% |
| 1990 | 1,622 | | −6.1% |
| 2000 | 1,650 | | 1.7% |
| 2010 | 1,767 | | 7.1% |
| 2020 | 1,593 | | −9.8% |
U.S. Decennial Census

=== 2020 census ===
As of the 2020 census, Senath had a population of 1,593. The median age was 38.3 years. 24.5% of residents were under the age of 18 and 15.5% of residents were 65 years of age or older. For every 100 females there were 98.6 males, and for every 100 females age 18 and over there were 96.1 males age 18 and over.

0.0% of residents lived in urban areas, while 100.0% lived in rural areas.

There were 590 households in Senath, of which 33.4% had children under the age of 18 living in them. Of all households, 40.7% were married-couple households, 19.7% were households with a male householder and no spouse or partner present, and 33.2% were households with a female householder and no spouse or partner present. About 34.4% of all households were made up of individuals and 15.9% had someone living alone who was 65 years of age or older.

There were 709 housing units, of which 16.8% were vacant. The homeowner vacancy rate was 4.1% and the rental vacancy rate was 13.3%.

Racial composition as of the 2020 census
| Race | Number | Percent |
|---|---|---|
| White | 1,104 | 69.3% |
| Black or African American | 32 | 2.0% |
| American Indian and Alaska Native | 6 | 0.4% |
| Asian | 0 | 0.0% |
| Native Hawaiian and Other Pacific Islander | 0 | 0.0% |
| Some other race | 343 | 21.5% |
| Two or more races | 108 | 6.8% |
| Hispanic or Latino (of any race) | 510 | 32.0% |

=== 2010 census ===
As of the census of 2010, there were 1,767 people, 661 households, and 433 families living in the city. The population density was 920.3 inhabitants per square mile (355.3/km^{2}). There were 765 housing units at an average density of 398.4 per square mile (153.8/km^{2}). The racial makeup of the city was 76.74% White, 1.08% Black or African American, 0.17% Native American, 0.11% Asian, 20.71% from other races, and 1.19% from two or more races. Hispanic or Latino of any race were 27.62% of the population.

There were 661 households, of which 37.1% had children under the age of 18 living with them, 48.4% were married couples living together, 11.8% had a female householder with no husband present, 5.3% had a male householder with no wife present, and 34.5% were non-families. 31.0% of all households were made up of individuals, and 17.1% had someone living alone who was 65 years of age or older. The average household size was 2.56 and the average family size was 3.24.

The median age in the city was 37 years. 28.5% of residents were under the age of 18; 7.2% were between the ages of 18 and 24; 23.8% were from 25 to 44; 22.9% were from 45 to 64; and 17.5% were 65 years of age or older. The gender makeup of the city was 46.3% male and 53.7% female.

=== 2000 census ===
As of the census of 2000, there were 1,650 people, 688 households, and 427 families living in the city. The population density was 865.3 inhabitants per square mile (334.1/km^{2}). There were 783 housing units at an average density of 410.6 per square mile (158.5/km^{2}). The racial makeup of the city was 91.76% White, 0.55% African American, 0.36% Native American, 0.06% Asian, 6.48% from other races, and 0.79% from two or more races. Hispanic or Latino of any race were 11.58% of the population.

There were 688 households, of which 26.3% had children under the age of 18 living with them, 48.0% were married couples living together, 10.9% had a female householder with no husband present, and 37.8% were non-families. Of all households, 34.2% were made up of individuals, and 20.3% had someone living alone who was 65 years of age or older. The average household size was 2.26 and the average family size was 2.89.

Of the city's population, 22.5% were under the age of 18, 7.2% were from 18 to 24, 24.7% were from 25 to 44, 20.8% were from 45 to 64, and 24.8% were 65 years of age or older. The median age was 41 years. For every 100 females, there were 88.4 males. For every 100 females age 18 and over, there were 81.4 males.

== Education ==
Senath-Hornersville C-8 School District, which covers the municipality, operates one elementary school and Senath-Hornersville Sr. High School. The middle school is located in Hornersville.

Senath has a public library, a branch of the Dunklin County Library.

== Notable people ==
- Onie Wheeler (1921–1984) – bluegrass/country/rockabilly musician
