= Clarkton, Missouri =

- City
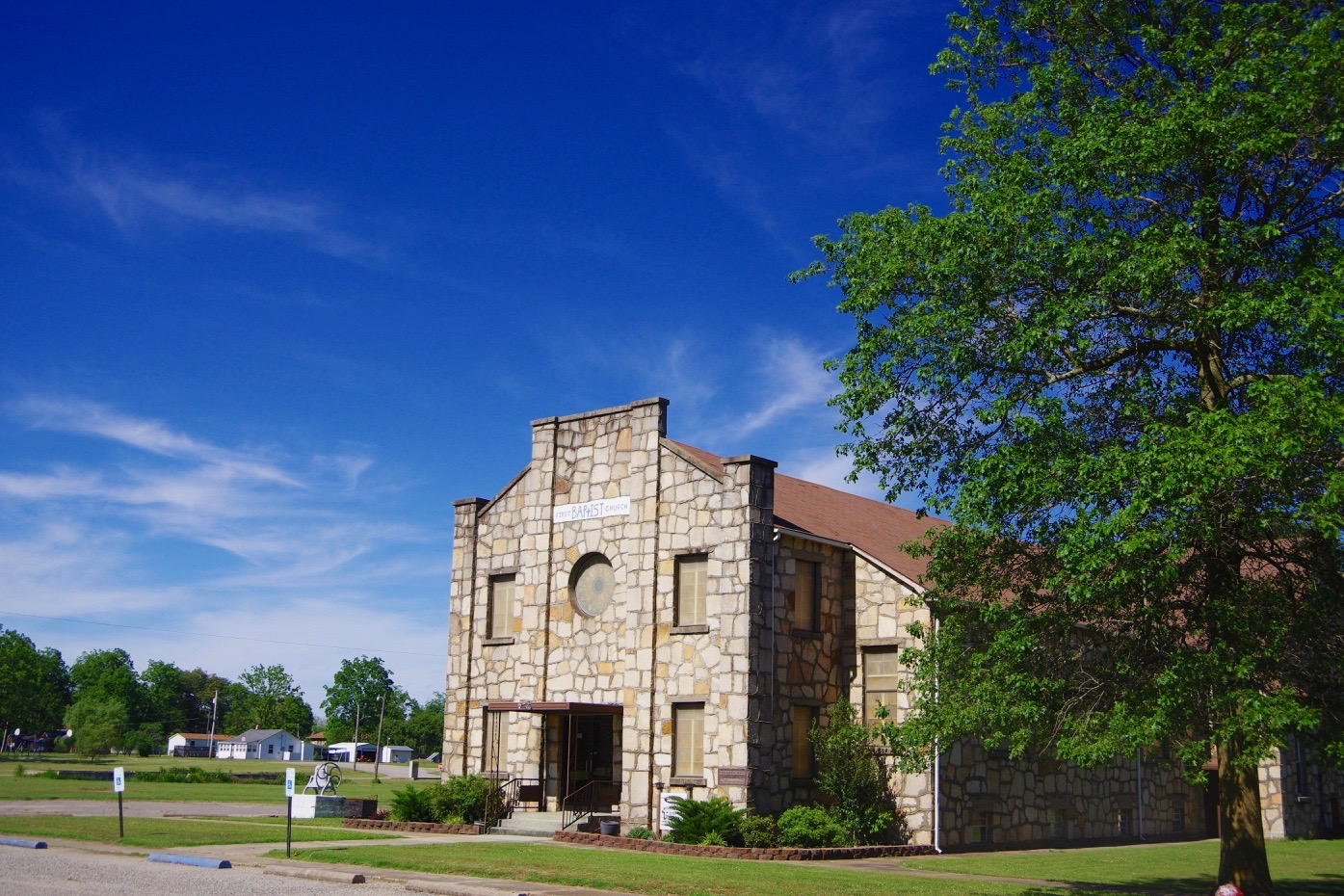
- First Baptist Church

- Location of Clarkton, Missouri
- Coordinates: 36°27′3″N 89°58′4″W
- Country: United States
- State: Missouri
- County: Dunklin

Government
  - mayor: Diana reliy
  - mayor pro temp: Paul Mitchell

Area
  - Total: 1.13 sq mi (2.93 km^{2})
  - Land: 1.13 sq mi (2.93 km^{2})
  - Water: 0 sq mi (0.00 km^{2})
- Elevation: 279 ft (85 m)

Population (2020)
  - Total: 1,009
  - Density: 893.4/sq mi (344.95/km^{2})
- Time zone: UTC-6 (Central (CST))
  - Summer (DST): UTC-5 (CDT)
- ZIP code: 63837
- Area code: 573
- FIPS code: 29-14212
- GNIS feature ID: 2393546

Clarkton is a city in Dunklin County, Missouri, United States. The population was 1,009 at the 2020 census. Clarkton is the oldest city in Dunklin County.

== History ==
Originally called Beech, the town site was platted as Clarkton in 1876. The present name is after Henry E. Clark, a contractor on a new plank road leading to town. A post office called Beech was established in 1855, and the name was changed to Clarkton in 1870.

== Geography ==
Clarkton is located at 36°27′3″N 89°58′4″W (36.450899, -89.967853). It lies at the intersection of Missouri Route 25 and Missouri Route 162 in the western Bootheel. Gideon is located just to the east, and Holcomb to the southwest.

According to the United States Census Bureau, the city has a total area of 1.13 square miles (2.93 km^{2}), all land.

== Demographics ==
Historical population
| Census | Pop. | Note | %± |
|---|---|---|---|
| 1880 | 314 | | — |
| 1910 | 682 | | — |
| 1920 | 689 | | 1.0% |
| 1930 | 493 | | −28.4% |
| 1940 | 733 | | 48.7% |
| 1950 | 1,004 | | 37.0% |
| 1960 | 1,049 | | 4.5% |
| 1970 | 1,177 | | 12.2% |
| 1980 | 1,228 | | 4.3% |
| 1990 | 1,113 | | −9.4% |
| 2000 | 1,330 | | 19.5% |
| 2010 | 1,288 | | −3.2% |
| 2020 | 1,009 | | −21.7% |

=== 2010 census ===
As of the census of 2010, there were 1,288 people, 495 households, and 327 families living in the city. The population density was 1,139.8 inhabitants per square mile (440.1/km^{2}). There were 557 housing units at an average density of 492.9 per square mile (190.3/km^{2}). The racial makeup of the city was 84.32% White, 5.05% Black or African American, 0.31% Native American, 8.15% from other races, and 2.17% from two or more races. Hispanic or Latino of any race were 9.78% of the population.

There were 495 households, of which 37.0% had children under the age of 18 living with them, 41.4% were married couples living together, 18.4% had a female householder with no husband present, 6.3% had a male householder with no wife present, and 33.9% were non-families. 29.7% of all households were made up of individuals, and 11.7% had someone living alone who was 65 years of age or older. The average household size was 2.60 and the average family size was 3.20.

The median age in the city was 32.9 years. 30% of residents were under the age of 18; 10.2% were between the ages of 18 and 24; 25.4% were from 25 to 44; 24% were from 45 to 64; and 10.3% were 65 years of age or older. The gender makeup of the city was 48.4% male and 51.6% female.

=== 2000 census ===
As of the census of 2000, there were 1,330 people, 537 households, and 366 families living in the city. The population density was 1,182.1 inhabitants per square mile (456.4/km^{2}). There were 598 housing units at an average density of 531.5 per square mile (205.2/km^{2}). The racial makeup of the city was 91.58% White, 4.51% African American, 0.38% Native American, 0.15% Asian, 1.80% from other races, and 1.58% from two or more races. Hispanic or Latino of any race were 3.53% of the population.

There were 537 households, out of which 35.4% had children under the age of 18 living with them, 44.5% were married couples living together, 18.6% had a female householder with no husband present, and 31.8% were non-families. 28.9% of all households were made up of individuals, and 14.2% had someone living alone who was 65 years of age or older. The average household size was 2.48 and the average family size was 2.99.

In the city the population was spread out, with 30.0% under the age of 18, 10.0% from 18 to 24, 27.5% from 25 to 44, 19.0% from 45 to 64, and 13.5% who were 65 years of age or older. The median age was 33 years. For every 100 females, there were 91.6 males. For every 100 females age 18 and over, there were 85.1 males.

The median income for a household in the city was $16,250, and the median income for a family was $20,350. Males had a median income of $20,147 versus $19,479 for females. The per capita income for the city was $9,292. About 35.2% of families and 40.0% of the population were below the poverty line, including 53.1% of those under age 18 and 17.9% of those age 65 or over.

== Education ==
- Clarkton C-4 School District, which covers the municipality, operates one elementary school and Clarkton High School.
- Clarkton has a public library, a branch of the Dunklin County Library.

== Notable people ==
- Charles and Bettie Birthright, African American couple born into slavery and freed after the Civil War lived in Clarkton, Missouri
- Leary Lentz, Former basketball player for the Houston Mavericks; born here.
- Gary Blaylock, Former MLB player and pitching coach of the 1985 Kansas City Royals.
