= Campbell, Missouri =

- City
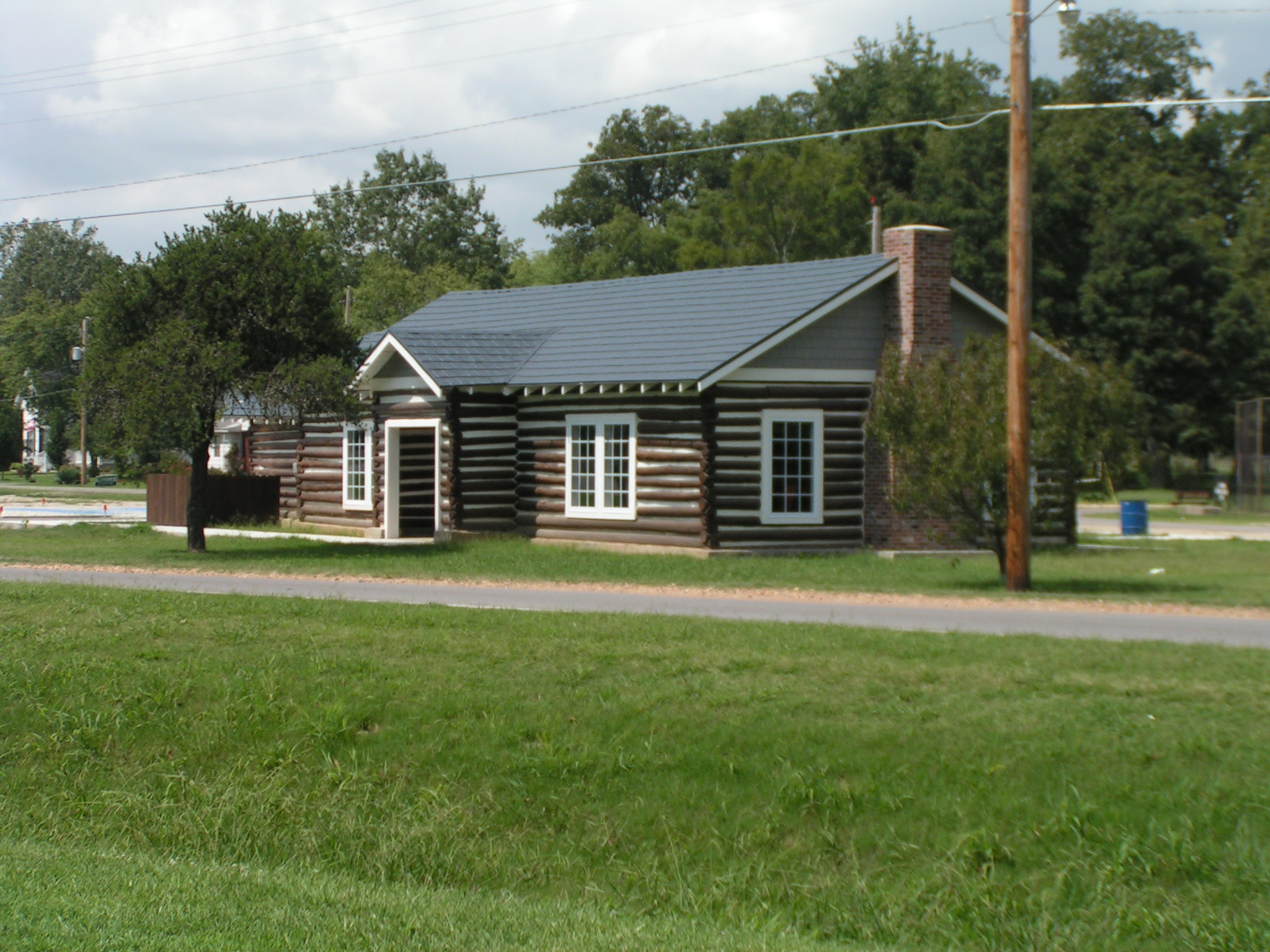
- Campbell Visitors Center
- Motto: Peach Capital of Missouri
- Location of Campbell, Missouri
- Coordinates: 36°29′34″N 90°4′24″W
- Country: United States
- State: Missouri
- County: Dunklin

Area
  - Total: 1.41 sq mi (3.64 km^{2})
  - Land: 1.41 sq mi (3.64 km^{2})
  - Water: 0 sq mi (0.00 km^{2})
- Elevation: 315 ft (96 m)

Population (2020)
  - Total: 1,605
  - Density: 1,142.8/sq mi (441.24/km^{2})
- Time zone: UTC-6 (Central (CST))
  - Summer (DST): UTC-5 (CDT)
- ZIP code: 63933
- Area code: 573
- FIPS code: 29-10864
- GNIS feature ID: 2393725

Campbell is a city in northern Dunklin County, Missouri, United States. The population was 1,605 at the 2020 census.

== History ==
Campbell was originally called Four Mile, and under the latter name settlement was made in 1844. The town site was platted in 1886, and the present name adopted from Alexander Campbell, a local judge. A post office called Four Mile was established in 1855, and the name was changed to Campbell in 1882.

== Geography ==
Campbell is located in the northwestern part of the Missouri Bootheel at the intersection of US Route 62 and Missouri Route 53. Malden is seven miles to the northeast and St. Francis, Arkansas is 4.5 miles to the southwest on the St. Francis River. Kennett is approximately 17 miles to the south.

According to the United States Census Bureau, the city has a total area of 1.40 square miles (3.63 km^{2}), all land.

== Demographics ==
Historical population
Census	Pop.	Note	%±
1900	737		—
1910	1,781		141.7%
1920	2,025		13.7%
1930	1,592		−21.4%
1940	1,786		12.2%
1950	1,931		8.1%
1960	1,964		1.7%
1970	1,979		0.8%
1980	2,134		7.8%
1990	2,165		1.5%
2000	1,883		−13.0%
2010	1,992		5.8%
2020	1,605		−19.4%

=== 2020 census ===
As of the 2020 census, Campbell had a population of 1,605. The median age was 43.6 years. 22.4% of residents were under the age of 18 and 20.8% of residents were 65 years of age or older. For every 100 females there were 89.0 males, and for every 100 females age 18 and over there were 85.0 males age 18 and over.

0.0% of residents lived in urban areas, while 100.0% lived in rural areas.

There were 636 households in Campbell, of which 29.2% had children under the age of 18 living in them. Of all households, 38.4% were married-couple households, 18.4% were households with a male householder and no spouse or partner present, and 31.4% were households with a female householder and no spouse or partner present. About 33.3% of all households were made up of individuals and 14.3% had someone living alone who was 65 years of age or older.

There were 747 housing units, of which 14.9% were vacant. The homeowner vacancy rate was 0.0% and the rental vacancy rate was 13.8%.

Racial composition as of the 2020 census
Race	Number	Percent
White	1,493	93.0%
Black or African American	11	0.7%
American Indian and Alaska Native	6	0.4%
Asian	0	0.0%
Native Hawaiian and Other Pacific Islander	0	0.0%
Some other race	9	0.6%
Two or more races	86	5.4%
Hispanic or Latino (of any race)	45	2.8%

=== 2010 census ===
As of the census of 2010, there were 1,992 people, 799 households, and 495 families living in the city. The population density was 1,422.9 inhabitants per square mile (549.4/km^{2}). There were 903 housing units at an average density of 645.0 per square mile (249.0/km^{2}). The racial makeup of the city was 97.84% White, 0.10% Black or African American, 0.25% Native American, 0.05% Asian, 0.45% from other races, and 1.31% from two or more races. Hispanic or Latino people of any race were 2.11% of the population.

There were 799 households, of which 32.7% had children under the age of 18 living with them, 40.6% were married couples living together, 15.9% had a female householder with no husband present, 5.5% had a male householder with no wife present, and 38.0% were non-families. 32.7% of all households were made up of individuals, and 16.9% had someone living alone who was 65 years of age or older. The average household size was 2.40 and the average family size was 3.03.

The median age in the city was 39.8 years. 24.8% of residents were under the age of 18; 8.2% were between the ages of 18 and 24; 23% were from 25 to 44; 24.6% were from 45 to 64; and 19.4% were 65 years of age or older. The gender makeup of the city was 46.5% male and 53.5% female.

=== 2000 census ===
As of the census of 2000, there were 1,883 people, 853 households, and 499 families living in the city. The population density was 1,477.9 inhabitants per square mile (570.6/km^{2}). There were 966 housing units at an average density of 758.2 per square mile (292.7/km^{2}). The racial makeup of the city was 98.14% White, 0.58% Native American, 0.16% Pacific Islander, 0.27% from other races, and 0.85% from two or more races. Hispanic or Latino people of any race were 1.38% of the population.

There were 853 households, out of which 28.5% had children under the age of 18 living with them, 40.3% were married couples living together, 14.3% had a female householder with no husband present, and 41.4% were non-families. 37.5% of all households were made up of individuals, and 22.2% had someone living alone who was 65 years of age or older. The average household size was 2.21 and the average family size was 2.90.

In the city the population was spread out, with 24.7% under the age of 18, 8.2% from 18 to 24, 25.9% from 25 to 44, 21.3% from 45 to 64, and 19.9% who were 65 years of age or older. The median age was 38 years. For every 100 females, there were 88.9 males. For every 100 females age 18 and over, there were 81.3 males.

The median income for a household in the city was $21,838, and the median income for a family was $27,802. Males had a median income of $24,286 versus $17,000 for females. The per capita income for the city was $14,026. About 11.6% of families and 20.2% of the population were below the poverty line, including 27.0% of those under age 18 and 18.8% of those age 65 or over.

== Education ==
Campbell R-2 School District, which covers the municipality, operates one elementary school and Campbell High School.

Campbell has a public library, a branch of the Dunklin County Library.

== Arts and culture ==
The city of Campbell holds many events for the town and surrounding areas, including Easter egg hunts in the softball fields, fireworks for the 4th of July, citywide yard sales, auto shows, craft fairs, senior citizen dances, Campbell High School annual reunions, and the annual Missouri Peach Fair.

In 1944, the Campbell American Legion, local peach farmers, and local business owners hosted the first ever Peach Festival. This was initially a one-day event then, including a picnic where people could barbecue, and prizes given to the farmers with the best peaches. In 2011, the event expanded to become the official Missouri Peach Fair. It is now a seven-day celebration of a good year's harvest. It includes carnival rides, arcade games, food stands, pageant contests, and raffle drawings.

== Notable people ==
- Carl Edward Bailey, Arkansas Attorney General (1934) and Governor (1937–1941)
- Jake Crawford, professional baseball player
