= 2021 Monette–Samburg tornado =

EF4 tornado in the United States

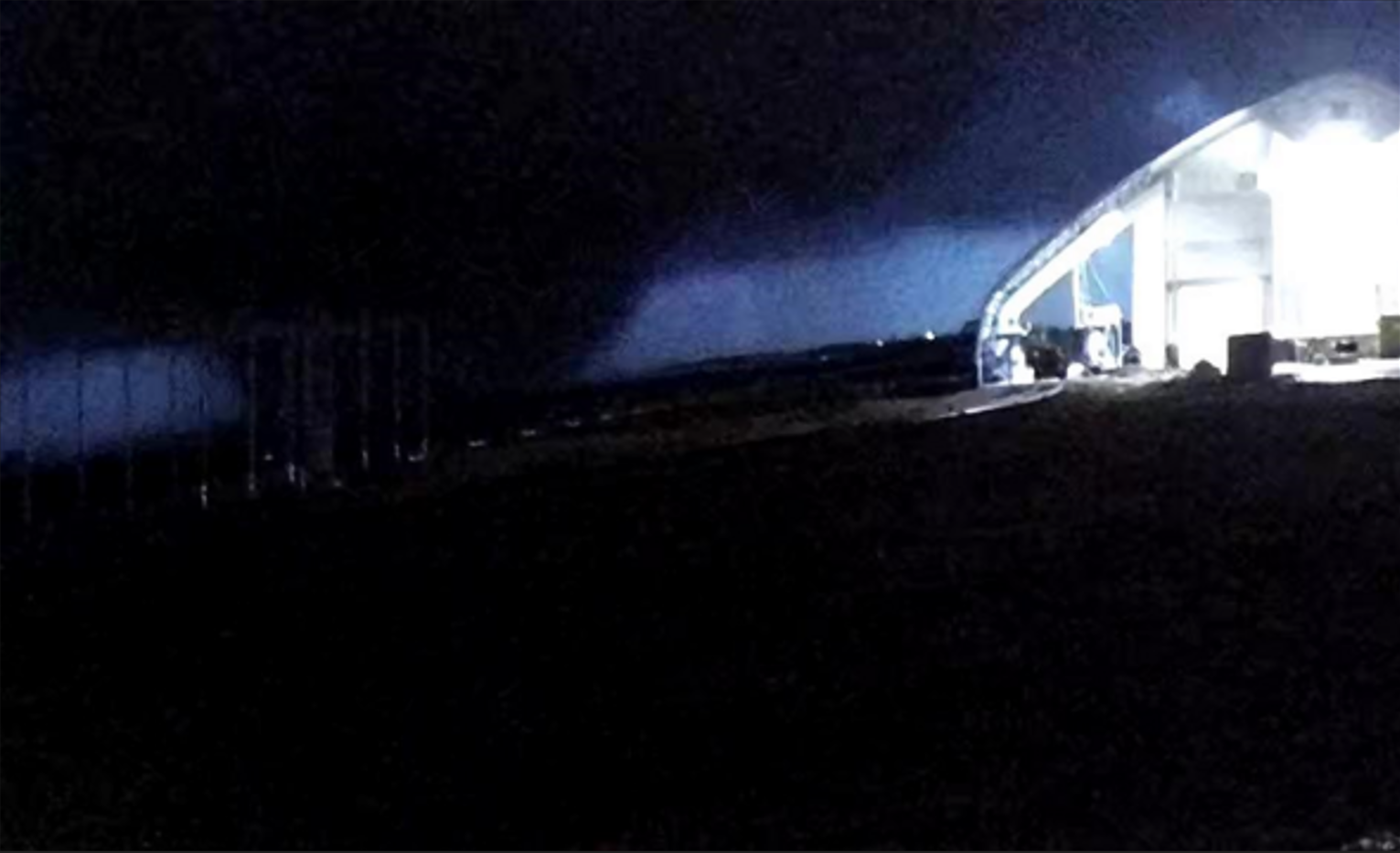
- The large tornado being illuminated by lightning near Hayti, Missouri.

Meteorological history
- Formed: December 10, 2021, 7:24 p.m. CST (UTC–06:00)
- Dissipated: December 10, 2021, 8:36 p.m. CST (UTC–06:00)
- Duration: 1 hour, 29 minutes

EF4 tornado
- on the Enhanced Fujita scale
- Path length: 81.17 miles (130.63 km)
- Highest winds: 170 mph (270 km/h)

Overall effects
- Fatalities: 8 (+1 indirect)
- Injuries: 16
- Damage: $13.5 million (2021 USD)
- Areas affected: Craighead (AR), Mississippi (AR), Dunklin (MO), Pemiscot (MO), Lake (TN), Obion (TN) counties.
- Part of the Tornado outbreak of December 10–11, 2021 and Tornadoes of 2021

Throughout the evening hours of December 10, 2021, a large and destructive nocturnal tornado struck areas in and around the cities and communities of Monette and Leachville in Arkansas, Braggadocio and Hayti in Missouri, and Tiptonville and Samburg in Tennessee, tracking through three states and killing eight people, with 16 others sustaining injuries. The tornado was the second strongest and third deadliest of the tornado outbreak of December 10–11, 2021. The tornado reached peak intensity twice, the first time east of Braggadocio and the second time in Tiptonville, leading the National Weather Service to assign a rating of low-end EF4 on the Enhanced Fujita scale, with maximum wind speeds estimated at 170 mph (270 km/h).

Early estimates suggested that the tornado family—identified by some media outlets as a "quad-state tornado", due to the storm's long track extending into Kentucky and its similarity to the 219-mile (352 km) tri-state tornado of 1925—might have cut a path of up to 250 miles (400 km) across the affected areas, making it the longest-tracked tornado in history. However, storm surveys found that the majority of the storm's path consisted of two distinct EF4 tornadoes – the Monette–Samburg tornado and the western Kentucky tornado – with three short-lived and weak tornadoes in between them in northwestern Obion County, Tennessee. The parent supercell that produced the two EF4 tornadoes, and eleven tornadoes in total, later became known as the "quad-state supercell".

== Meteorological synopsis ==
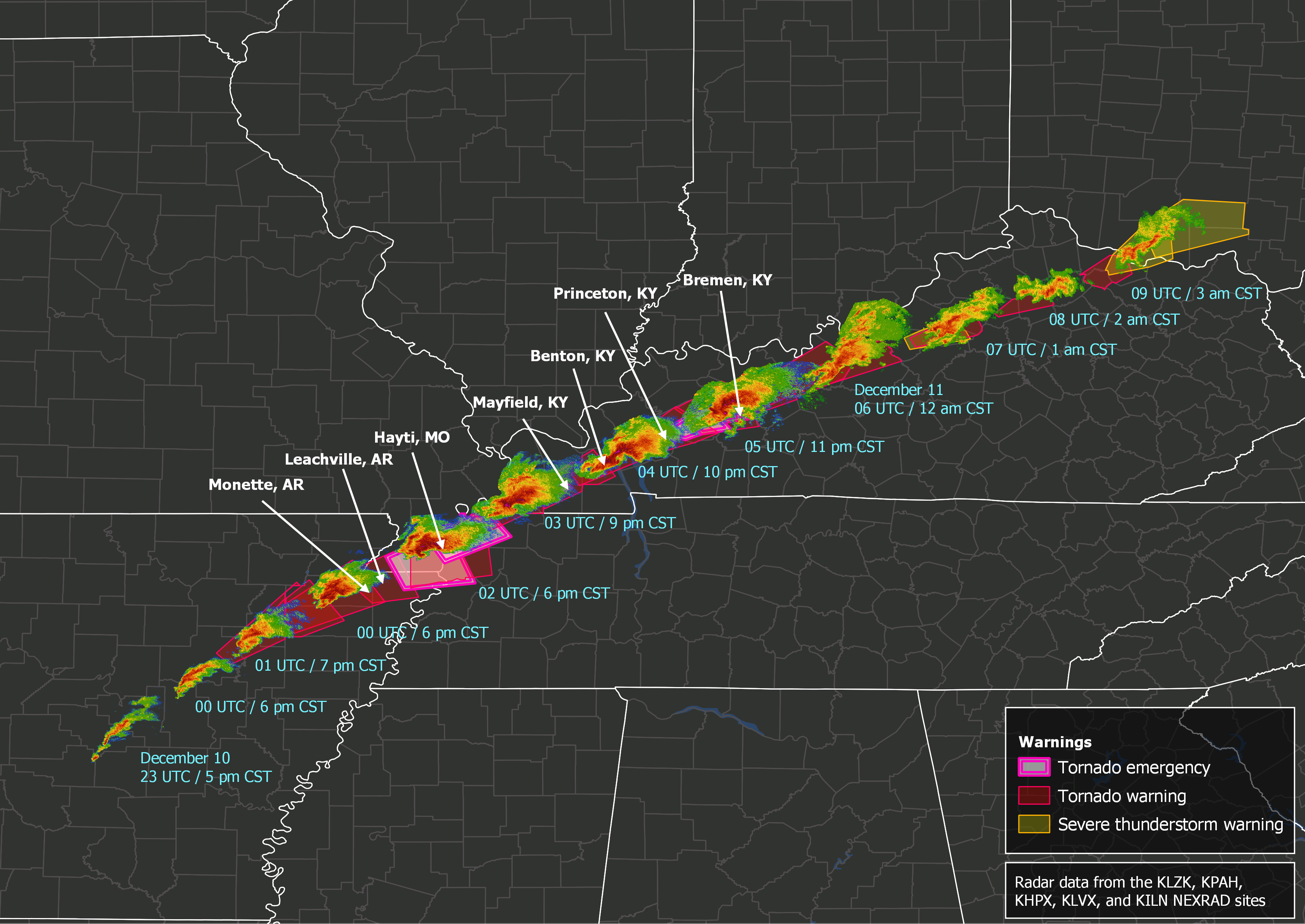
Radar collage of a supercell that spawned a tornado family during the outbreak

On December 8, the Storm Prediction Center (SPC) outlined a slight risk of severe weather across a broad area of the Mississippi Valley. Despite the potential for a higher-end severe threat to materialize, forecasters expressed uncertainty regarding the extent of instability, degree of directional wind shear, and late timing of potential storms. The following day, the SPC noted increased certainty of organized severe thunderstorm potential extending from southeastern Arkansas northeast into southern Indiana, thereby upgrading that region to an enhanced risk.

As an intense upper-level trough progressed across the High Plains, with robust instability and moisture return realized across the Mississippi Valley, the SPC expanded the enhanced risk and introduced a moderate risk area from northeastern Arkansas into southern Illinois on the morning of December 10. Forecasters indicated that atmospheric conditions favored the development of nocturnal supercells capable of producing long-tracked, strong tornadoes.

At 3:00 p.m. CST (21:00 UTC), the SPC issued a tornado watch across the highest risk area (encompassing central and eastern Arkansas, west Tennessee, northwestern Mississippi, southeastern Missouri, and southern portions of Illinois and Indiana), the first of eleven issued over subsequent hours over the middle Mississippi Valley. Initial storms developed across central Arkansas around 2:00 p.m. CST (20:00 UTC), with even weaker activity developing over central Missouri a little over 1 1/2 hours later; additional clusters of thunderstorms developed over southwestern Missouri (forming between Bolivar and Carthage, eventually back-building into northeastern Oklahoma) and central Arkansas (forming southwest of Hot Springs) between 5:00 and 5:30 p.m. CST (23:00–23:30 UTC). Though this activity lacked much vigor at its onset due to a strong capping inversion, the convective cells began to show organization as they progressed eastward.

One such storm—which formed from the initial mid-afternoon activity near Arkadelphia, Arkansas—matured into a long-lived supercell as it progressed in an unstable, deeply moist, and highly sheared environment; this cell ultimately persisted for longer than 550 miles (890 km) over several hours from eastern Arkansas to northeastern Kentucky, producing two large and intense tornadoes along its track, among eleven tornadoes in total. The fifth and first violent tornado produced by the storm was this tornado.

== Tornado summary ==
=== Northeast Arkansas ===
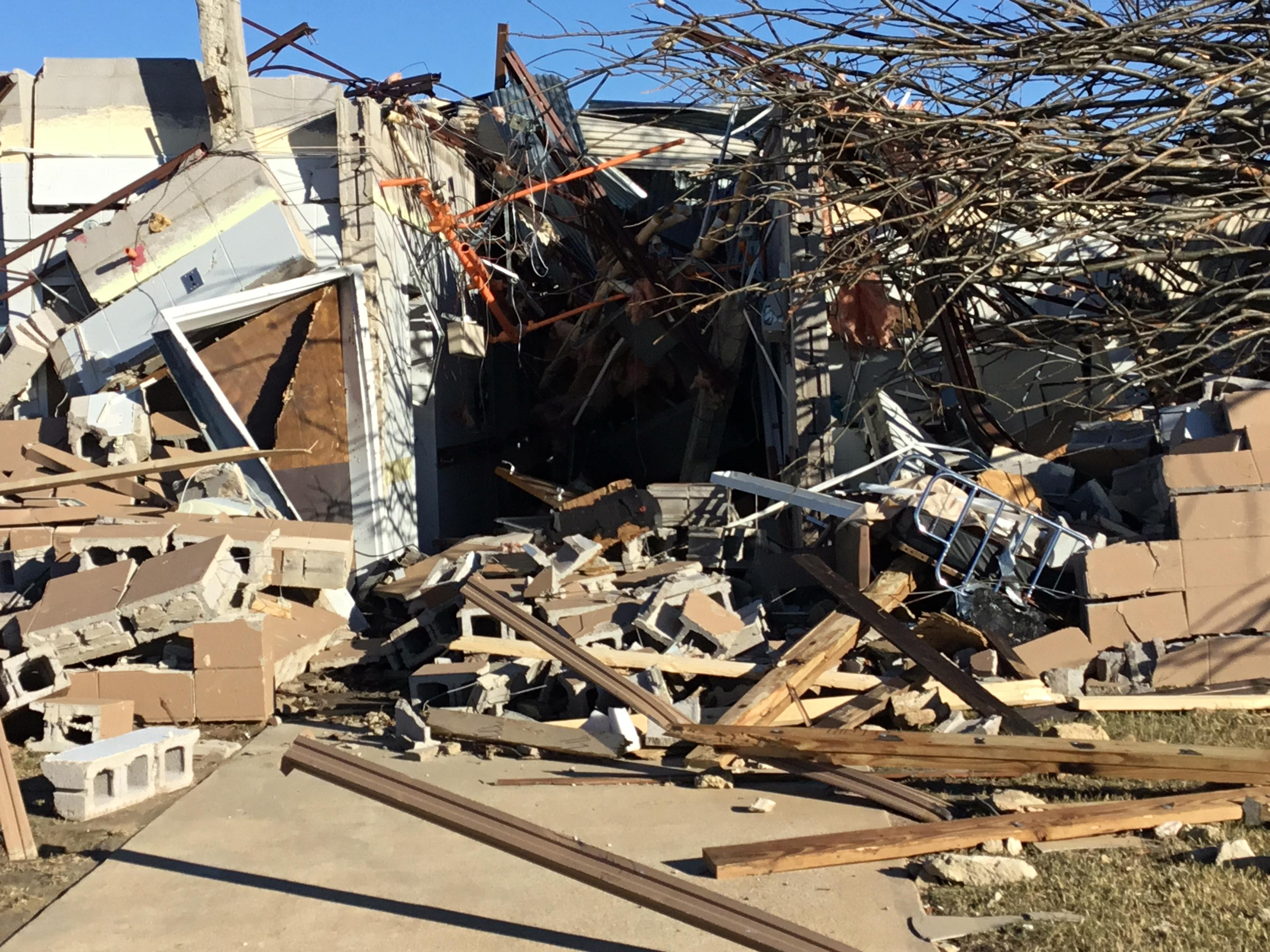
Low-end EF3 damage to the Monette manor nursing home.

The tornado first touched down in Craighead County, Arkansas, just north of Bay, at 7:07 p.m. CST (01:07 UTC) on the evening of December 10, initially causing minor EF0 tree and outbuilding damage. As it moved through the south side of Bowman, it caused EF0 to EF1 damage as roofs were damaged, power poles and tree limbs were downed, and a radio antenna at a residence was bent. The tornado quickly intensified to EF2 strength as it crossed AR 18 and passed northwest of Lake City, downing trees and damaging or destroying some metal outbuildings. A house also sustained minor damage in this area and AR 135 north of the town was shut down due to downed power lines as well. It grew to a width of 800 yards (730 m) as it crossed County Road 505 and tracked to the northeast, snapping power poles and unroofing a house along County Road 508. Another house sustained major roof damage in this area, an irrigation pivot sprinkler was overturned, and a silo was damaged. The tornado reached low-end EF3 strength as it moved through the western and northern fringes of Monette at 7:23 p.m. CST (01:23 UTC), resulting in significant damage. Two industrial buildings were destroyed at the west edge of town, and many trees and power poles were snapped. The Monette Manor nursing home was struck by the tornado, killing one person and trapping 20 other residents and employees, including five people who were seriously injured. The building sustained major structural damage, losing much of its roof and sustaining the collapse of some masonry exterior walls. Multiple homes and mobile homes were damaged or destroyed in a neighborhood near the nursing home, and several large grain silos were torn apart. AR 139 was also shut down north of the town due to downed power lines on the roadways. Maximum wind speeds in the Monette area were estimated at 143 mph (230 km/h).

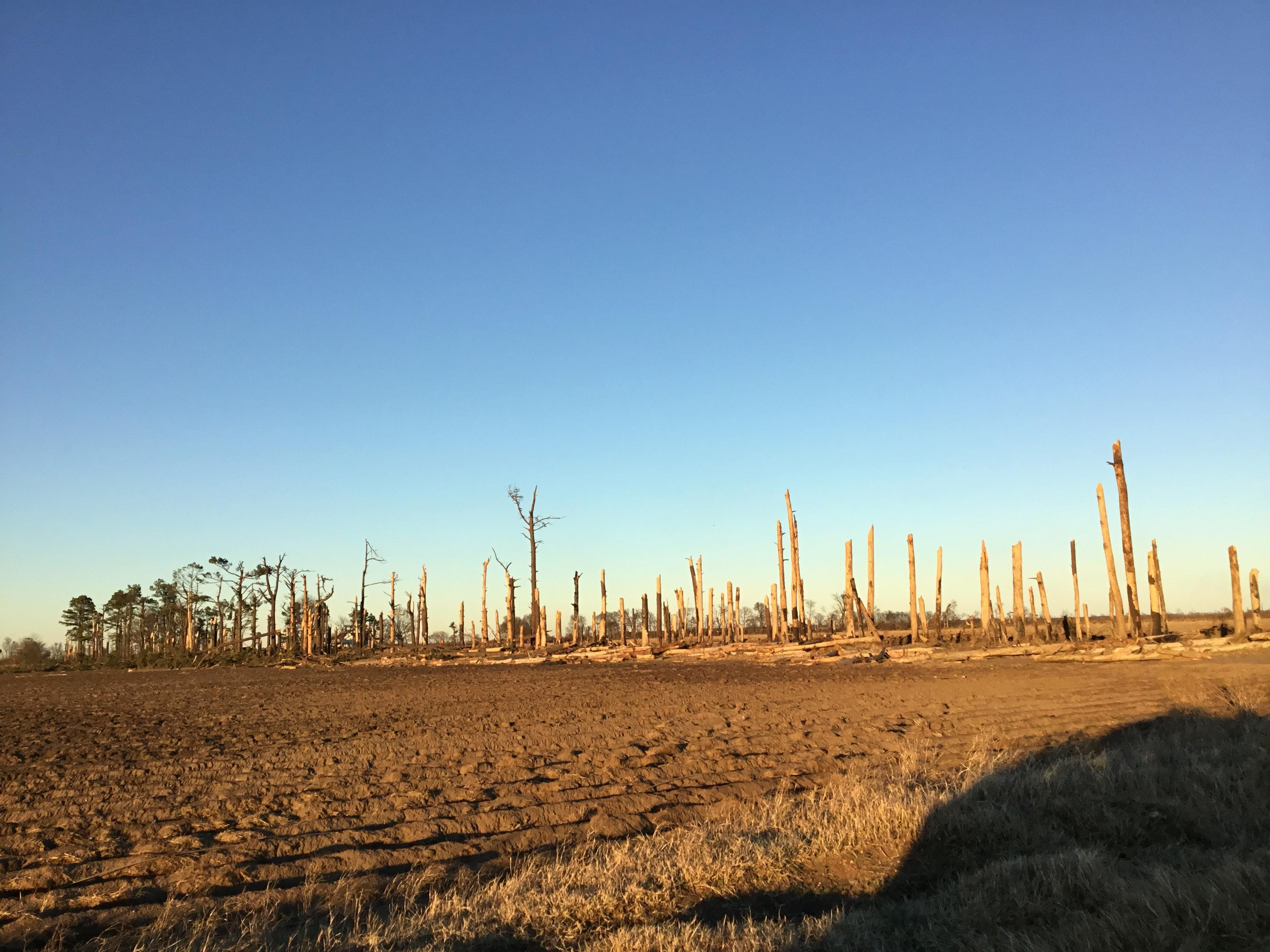
Trees that were completely debarked and denuded near Buckeye, Arkansas.

The tornado continued at low-end EF3 intensity as it crossed into northwestern Mississippi County, striking the northern part of Leachville at 7:30 p.m. CST (01:30 UTC). As the tornado crossed AR 77, it completely destroyed a local Dollar General store sweeping a portion of it off its foundation, killing the store's assistant manager. A few metal-framed warehouse buildings across AR 77 were badly damaged or destroyed, cars and semi-trailers were tossed, and multiple homes and mobile homes were damaged or destroyed in town. Extensive tree damage also occurred, and businesses in downtown Leachville had roofing blown off. Maximum wind speeds in the Leachville area were estimated at 145 mph (233 km/h). The tornado continued northeast for six miles (9.7 km) and grew larger as it passed near the rural community of Buckeye, and very intense tree damage was noted along West County Road 38. An entire row of large trees was completely debarked and denuded at this location, and an EF3 rating was applied. The tornado also snapped power poles and destroyed an outbuilding in this area.

=== Missouri Bootheel ===
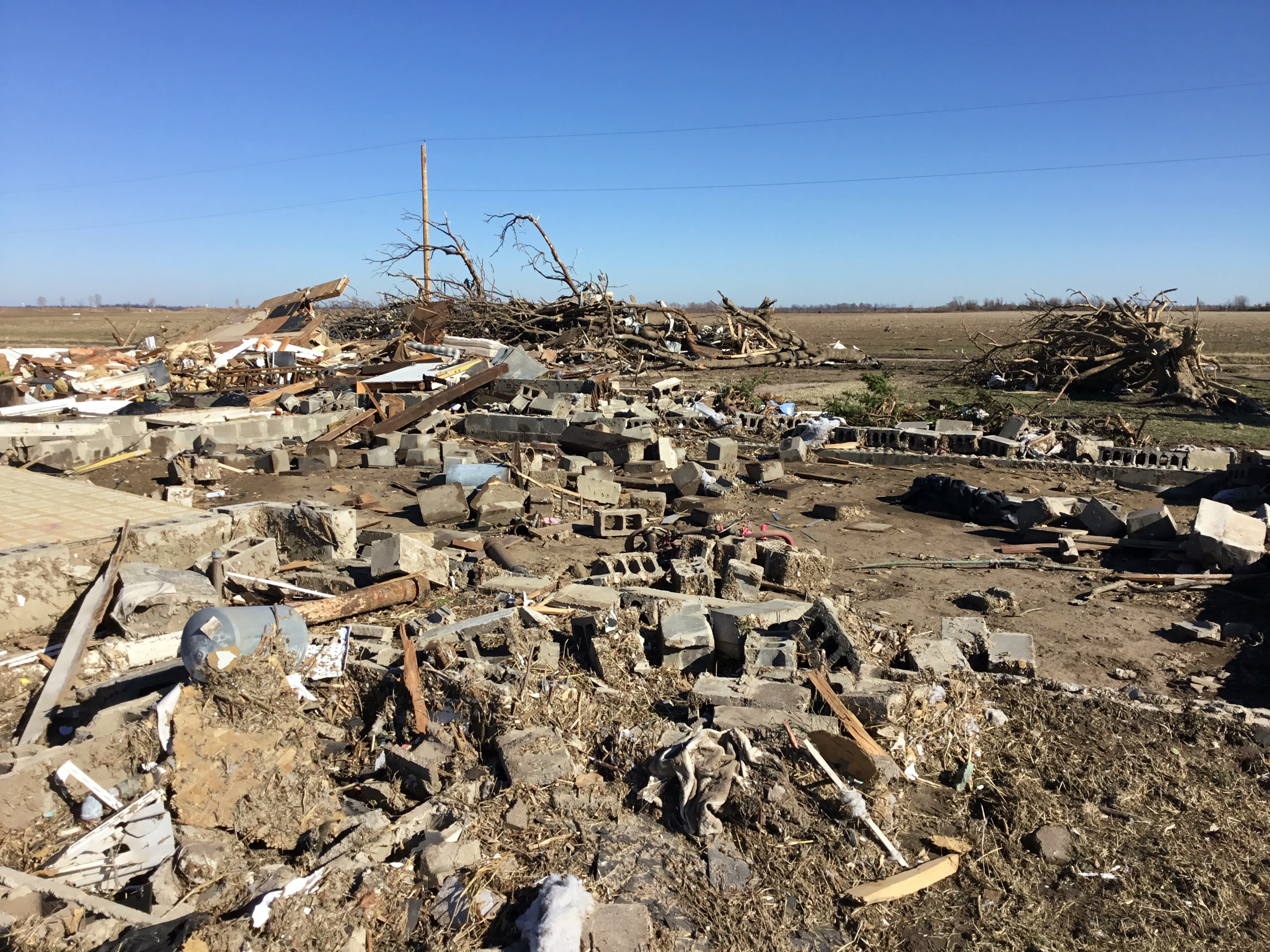
Low-end EF4 damage to a home near Braggadocio, Missouri.

As it crossed the state line into Dunklin County in the Missouri Bootheel at 7:40 p.m. CST (01:40 UTC), high-end EF2 damage occurred as multiple outbuildings, mobile homes, and houses were damaged or destroyed, and many power poles and trees were snapped, with some low-end debarking noted. It continued south of Hornersville and over the Hornersville Swamp Conservation Area. Trees and power poles were damaged in this area, and a mobile home also sustained minor damage. Farther to the northeast, the damage became more severe again as multiple metal truss transmission towers were twisted or collapsed near County Road 722, and damage in this area was rated EF3. A house along the periphery of the circulation sustained minor damage, and some power poles were pushed over as well. High-end EF2 damage occurred as the tornado then crossed into Pemiscot County west of Steele. Trees were snapped and denuded, power poles were downed, a couple of homes were heavily damaged, and a pickup truck was tossed along this segment of the path. The tornado then passed just south of Braggadocio, damaging or destroying some barns and outbuildings, and inflicting roof damage to homes. However, the tornado abruptly became violent as it moved through the intersection of State Highway J and County Highway 407 to the east of town, causing low-end EF4 damage as two homes were swept from their foundations and scattered across fields. A nine-year-old girl was killed, and her parents and two younger sisters were injured in the destruction of one of the homes. As it crossed I-55 just south of Hayti, the large wedge tornado weakened back to EF2 strength and blew multiple semi-trailer trucks and a car off the highway into a field. Several semi-truck drivers were injured here, and the driver of the car was killed. In addition to the two fatalities, at least nine people overall were injured in the county. An indirect fatality also occurred when a vehicle struck a downed utility pole and two indirect injuries were confirmed as well.

=== Northwest Tennessee ===
The tornado at EF4 intensity south of Tiptonville as captured by a security camera

East of Hayti, the tornado caused additional EF2 power pole damage and then crossed the Mississippi River into Lake County, Tennessee around 8:20 p.m. CST (02:20 UTC). It briefly crossed a bend in the river back into Missouri before crossing into Lake County again. Moving through central Lake County, the tornado narrowly missed the small community of Wynnburg, producing EF3 damage in rural areas outside of town, where numerous large trees were snapped and denuded, and some were debarked. Metal high-tension power poles were bent to the ground in this area as well. The tornado reached peak intensity a second time near Tiptonville as it moved across the southern shore of Reelfoot Lake, striking the Cypress Point Resort and causing three fatalities. A bait and tackle shop sustained EF4 damage as it was swept clean from its foundation, with only a bare concrete slab remaining. Multiple cottages, houses, and cabins were also destroyed, while a couple of two-story hotel buildings sustained total destruction of their top floors and collapse of many walls on their first floors, with damage to those structures rated EF3. A gift shop and a restaurant also sustained severe damage, large amounts of debris were scattered throughout the area, and several people sustained serious injuries at the resort. The tornado crossed the southeastern part of the lake, before moving ashore again as it entered Obion County, causing high-end EF2 damage as it damaged or destroyed cabins, outbuildings, and houses along Lake Drive. One person was killed in a mobile home park in this area when their RV was destroyed. Continuing at high-end EF2 strength, the tornado narrowed as it impacted the small town of Samburg, resulting in major damage along SR 22. Houses in town had roofs and exterior walls ripped off, RV campers were tossed, and mobile homes were destroyed. The city hall building, post office, a gas station, and several other buildings were damaged or destroyed as well. Northeast of town, the tornado began to weaken, with the roof being blown off a farm building along Old Samburg Road. Trees and tree limbs were also downed, and damage was rated EF1 in this area. It continued northeastward along the road, causing EF0 tree limb damage until it dissipated approximately 2.5 miles (4.0 km) northeast of Samburg at 8:36 p.m. CST (02:36 UTC).

== Aftermath ==
The tornado was rated as a low-end EF4 with winds estimated at 170 mph (270 km/h), reaching a peak width of 1,800 yards (1,600 m) along an 81.17-mile (130.63 km) path through portions of three states, remaining on the ground for 89 minutes. Eight fatalities and one indirect fatality occurred. Officially, 16 injuries and two indirect injuries, some of which were serious, were confirmed, although the number was likely higher than that. After the tornado dissipated, the parent supercell entered a cycling phase, producing three brief tornadoes, one rated EF1 and the other two rated EF0, in Obion County northeast of Samburg and west of Union City. As the storm passed to the northwest of Union City, it produced a stronger, longer-tracked tornado near Woodland Mills.

== See also ==
- Weather of 2021
- List of North American tornadoes and tornado outbreaks
- List of F4 and EF4 tornadoes
  - List of F4 and EF4 tornadoes (2020–present)
