= Missouri Route 164 =

State highway in Missouri, U.S.

Route 164
- Route 164 highlighted in blue

Route information
- Maintained by MoDOT
- Length: 38.71 mi (62.30 km)
- Existed: 1956–present

Major junctions
- West end: US 412 / Route F in Cardwell
- I-55 / US 61 in Steele
- East end: CRD 553 / Ferry Landing Road near the Mississippi River

Location
- Country: United States
- State: Missouri
- Counties: Dunklin, Pemiscot

Highway system
- Missouri State Highway System; Interstate; US; State; Supplemental
← Route 163	→ Route 165

Route 164 is a state highway in the Missouri Bootheel. The route starts at U.S. Route 412 (US 412) in Cardwell. The route travels eastward across the bootheel, and it goes through the towns of Arbyrd, Hornersville, Rives, and Steele. It becomes concurrent with US 61 briefly in Steele, and intersects Interstate 55 (I-55) east of the city. The route ends east of Cottonwood Point, near the Mississippi River.

The route was designated in 1956, replacing two supplemental routes that started from Cardwell and ended at Steele. In 1965, another former supplemental route was added to the route, extending the eastern terminus to Cottonwood Point. An interchange was constructed at I-55 in 1974.

== Route description ==
In 2015, Missouri Department of Transportation (MoDOT) calculated as many as 2,454 vehicles traveling on Route 164 west of I-55, and as few as 482 vehicles traveling east of Route H. This is expressed in terms of annual average daily traffic (AADT), a measure of traffic volume for any average day of the year.

The route is located in rural Dunklin and Pemiscot counties. Route 164 starts at US 412 and Route F on the southern city limit of Cardwell. The route travels north into the city as Main Street, and intersects the southern terminus of Route V at Pool Street. Route 164 travels eastward and leaves Cardwell past County Road 613 (CRD 613). The road crosses over Kennemore Slough and intersects US 412 for the second time. Route 164 continues eastward through farmland, and intersects Route 108 on the western side of Arbyrd. The routes are briefly concurrent, and Route 108 continues northward at Frisco Street. Route 164 travels along the city limit for Arbyrd and leaves the city at CRD 625. The road crosses over another river near Hollywood. The Hornersville Memorial Airport is located past Route K, west of the Hornersville. Route 164 intersects Route YY on the northern edge of the city and begins travelling north soon after. The road turns northeastward and parallels Little River until it reaches the unincorporated area of Cotton Plant. Inside the area, the route intersects Routes N and Y, resumes travelling eastward, and crosses over the Little River. West of CRD 709, Route 164 crosses over two unnamed streams. The road intersects Route TT, southwest of the village of Rives. It soon meets the terminus of Route PP, which leads to the center of the village, less than one mile later. At the Dunklin-Pemiscot county line, Route 164 intersects Route NN.

West of Denton, the road intersects Routes C and F. Route 164 shifts southwards near the Steele Municipal Airport. At Administration Drive, the road enters the city limits of Steele. The route turns northeast at First Street and turns southeast at Route Z. Travelling on Main Street, the route enters the center of the city and crosses the River Subdivision railroad. The route becomes concurrent with US 61 at Walnut Street. Travelling away from downtown Steele, the road crosses over a creek and leaves city limits at Cooter Road. Route 164 and US 61 travels slightly northward at the diamond interchange with I-55. US 61 travels concurrently with the interstate, thus ending the concurrency with Route 164. The route shifts back southward at Outer Road. At Acorn Corner, the road intersects the northern terminus of Route H. Travelling across farmland, it meets Route D at a T-intersection. The route travels southwards to Cottonwood Point, where it intersects Route DD. Route 164 then travels southeastwards to its eastern terminus at CRD 553. The road continues as Ferry Landing Road, which leads to a boat ramp.

== History ==
Around 1933, Route Y was designated along a gravel road from Cardwell to Caruth, through the community of Hollywood. About one year later, Route J was designated from Routes C and N near the Dunklin–Pemiscot county line to US 61 in Steele, and it was removed and designated as a part of Route N in 1937. The entirety of Route Y was paved by January 1946, at a cost of $38,233, and Route N was extended to Route Y by 1953, costing $133,138. The section of Route N from Route NN to US 61 was also paved during that time, and completely paved by 1955. In 1956, Route 164 was designated, replacing a majority of Routes N and Y. The route extended from Route 25 in Arbyrd to Route H east of Steele. Five years later, Route W was designated from the eastern terminus of Route 164 to Route D north of Cottonwood Point. Route 164 replaced Route W and was extended to Cottonwood Point by 1965. By 1972, Route 25 was rerouted between Cardwell and Arbyrd, and its old alignment through Cardwell was added to Route 164. An interchange at I-55 opened in November 1973, as part of a $13.5 million project. By 1983, Route 25 from the Arkansas–Missouri state line to Kennett was replaced by US 412.

== Major intersections ==
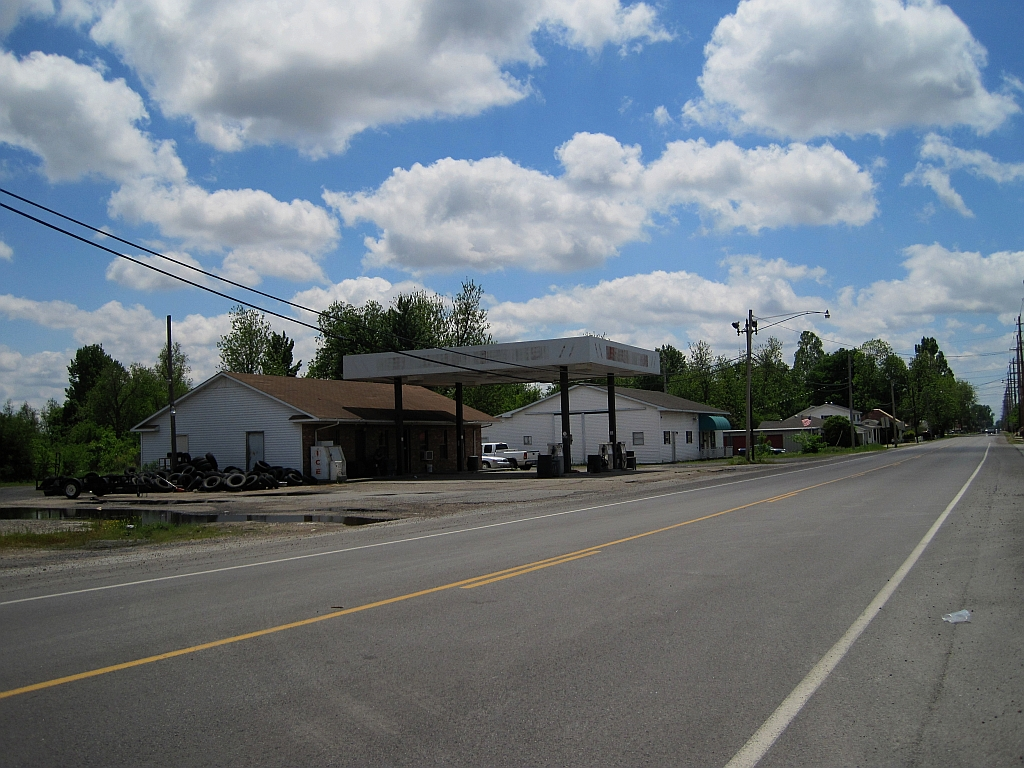
US 61 and Route 164 in Steele

County	Location	mi	km	Destinations	Notes
Dunklin	Cardwell	0.000	0.000	US 412 / Route F – Senath, Paragould, AR	Western terminus; Northern terminus of Route F
Dunklin	Cardwell	0.491	0.790	Route V	Southern terminus of Route V
Dunklin		1.836	2.955	US 412 – Senath	
Dunklin	Arbyrd	3.024	4.867	Route 108 – Leachville, AR	Western end of Route 108 concurrency
Dunklin	Arbyrd	3.507	5.644	Route 108 – Senath	Eastern end of Route 108 concurrency
Dunklin		8.033	12.928	Route K	Northern terminus of Route K
Dunklin	Hornersville	10.717	17.247	Route YY	Northern terminus of Route YY
Dunklin		14.204	22.859	Route N / Route Y – Caruth	Eastern terminus of Route N; Southern terminus of Route Y
Dunklin		17.587	28.304	Route TT – Gosnell, AR	Northern terminus of Route TT
Dunklin	Rives	18.835	30.312	Route PP – Rives	Southern terminus of Route PP
Dunklin–Pemiscot county line		21.601	34.763	Route NN – Gobler, Gosnell, AR	
Pemiscot		24.119	38.816	Route C / Route F – Holland	Southern terminus of Route C; Northern terminus of Route F
Pemiscot	Steele	28.796	46.343	Route Z	Southern terminus of Route Z
Pemiscot	Steele	29.118	46.861	US 61	Western end of US 61 concurrency
Pemiscot		31.119– 31.226	50.081– 50.253	I-55 / US 61 – Hayti, Blytheville, AR	Eastern end of US 61 concurrency at a diamond interchange
Pemiscot		32.580	52.432	Route H	
Pemiscot		36.569	58.852	Route D – Dyersburg, TN	Southern terminus of Route D
Pemiscot	Cottonwood Point	38.294	61.628	Route DD	Eastern terminus of Route DD
Pemiscot		38.710	62.298	CRD 553 / Ferry Landing Road	Eastern terminus
1.000 mi = 1.609 km; 1.000 km = 0.621 mi: Concurrency terminus
