= Brother Phelps =

American country music duo

- Doug (left) and Ricky Lee Phelps

Background information
- Origin: Edmonton, Kentucky, United States
- Genres: Country
- Years active: 1992–1995
- Label: Asylum
- Spinoff of: The Kentucky Headhunters
- Past members: Doug Phelps; Ricky Lee Phelps

Brother Phelps was an American country music duo from Edmonton, Kentucky. The duo consisted of brothers Ricky Lee Phelps and Doug Phelps, both vocalists and guitarists. Both brothers had left the Southern rock band the Kentucky Headhunters. In 1993, Brother Phelps charted with its debut single "Let Go", which reached a peak of No. 6 on the Billboard country music charts. In all, the duo charted six singles between 1993 and 1995 (although only one other single reached Top 40), in addition to recording two albums on Asylum Records. Brother Phelps disbanded in 1995, with Doug rejoining the Kentucky Headhunters as lead singer, and Ricky Lee assuming a solo career.

== Biography ==
The Brothers are Ricky Lee Phelps, who was born in 1953 Edmonton, Kentucky, and Doug Phelps who was born in Leachville, Arkansas, in 1960. They were raised in Arbyrd, Missouri which is in the Missouri Bootheel. Doug graduated from a small school named Southland in Cardwell, Missouri. They joined The Kentucky Headhunters in 1986. Ricky Lee served as lead vocalist, while Doug played bass guitar and sang backup vocals. The Kentucky Headhunters released its debut album, Pickin' on Nashville, in 1989, producing four Top 40 singles on the country charts with it. After the band's second album, 1991's Electric Barnyard, failed to produce a major hit, Ricky Lee and Doug announced that they were leaving to form their own group. Mark Orr then became lead singer of The Kentucky Headhunters, while Anthony Kenney took over as bass guitarist.

The newly formed duo (named Brother Phelps, after Ricky Lee and Doug's minister father), signed to Asylum Records in 1992. Unlike the country rock sounds of The Kentucky Headhunters, Brother Phelps featured a more traditional country music sound. Their first single, "Let Go", reached a peak of No. 6 on the Billboard Hot Country Singles & Tracks charts in 1993, higher than any of The Kentucky Headhunters' singles had peaked. The same year, the duo's first album (also titled Let Go) was released.

Brother Phelps' second and final album, Anyway the Wind Blows (its title track a J. J. Cale cover), was released in 1995, although it failed to produce any Top 40 singles. The duo disbanded in 1995, with Doug returning to the Kentucky Headhunters, assuming the role of lead vocalist after Orr's departure. Ricky Lee, meanwhile, continued to record as a solo artist.

== Discography ==
=== Albums ===
Title	Album details	Peak chart positions	
Title	Album details	US Country	US Heat
Let Go	Release date: August 3, 1993; Label: Asylum Records	56	21
Anyway the Wind Blows	Release date: March 7, 1995; Label: Asylum Records	43	24

=== Singles ===
Year	Single	Peak chart positions		Album
Year	Single	US Country	CAN Country	Album
1993	"Let Go"	6	8	Let Go
1993	"Were You Really Livin'"	28	54	Let Go
1994	"Eagle over Angel"	53	54	Let Go
1994	"Ever-Changing Woman"	62	90	Let Go
1995	"Anyway the Wind Blows"	53	48	Anyway the Wind Blows
1995	"Not So Different After All"	65	77	Anyway the Wind Blows

=== Music videos ===
Year	Video	Director
1993	"Let Go"	Steven T. Miller/R. Brad Murano
1993	"Were You Really Livin'"	Sherman Halsey
1994	"Eagle over Angel"	Steven T. Miller/R. Brad Murano
1994	"Ever-Changing Woman"	Michael McNamara
1995	"Any Way the Wind Blows"	Michael McNamara

== Awards and nominations ==
Year	Organization	Award	Nominee/Work	Result
1994	Country Music Association Awards	Vocal Duo of the Year	Brother Phelps	Nominated
1995	Country Music Association Awards	Vocal Duo of the Year	Brother Phelps	Nominated
