= U.S. Route 412 in Missouri =

Segment of American highway

U.S. Route 412
- US 412 highlighted in red

Route information
- Maintained by MoDOT
- Length: 50.767 mi (81.702 km)

Major junctions
- West end: US 412 at the Arkansas state line at Riverside
- Route 164 in Cardwell; Route 108 near Arbyrd; Route 84 from Kennett to Hayti; Route 25 in Kennett; I-55 / I-155 / US 61 in Hayti; Route 84 in Caruthersville
- East end: I-155 / US 412 at the Tennessee state line near Boothspoint, TN

Location
- Country: United States
- State: Missouri
- Counties: Dunklin, Pemiscot

Highway system
- United States Numbered Highway System; List; Special; Divided; Missouri State Highway System; Interstate; US; State; Supplemental
← US 400	→ Route 413

U.S. Route 412 (US 412) enters the state of Missouri from Arkansas near Cardwell. The highway leaves the state into Tennessee concurrent with I-155 near Caruthersville.

== Route description ==
US 412 enters the state from Arkansas after crossing the St. Francis River. The highway enters into the small town of Cardwell before turning to the north, passing by Arbyrd, and then going through Senath. In Kennett, the highway turns back to the east, concurrent with Route 84. In Hayti, US 412 has an interchange with I-55 and travels concurrent with I-155. The two highways pass through Caruthersville, and crosses the Mississippi River on the Caruthersville Bridge into Tennessee.

== Major intersections ==
County	Location	mi	km	Exit	Destinations	Notes
St. Francis River		0.00	0.00		US 412 west – Paragould	Continuation into Arkansas
St. Francis River		0.00	0.00		Arkansas–Missouri state line	
Dunklin	Cardwell	2.922	4.703		Route 164 east / Route F – Cardwell, Monette	
Dunklin		4.427	7.125		Route 164 – Cardwell, Steele	
Dunklin		7.065	11.370		Route 108 south – Arbyrd	
Dunklin	Kennett	23.598	37.977		Route 84 west – Rector	West end of Route 84 overlap
Dunklin	Kennett	23.810	38.318		Route 25 north – Holcomb	
Pemiscot	Hayti	37.884	60.968		Route 84 east – Hayti	East end of Route 84 overlap
Pemiscot	Hayti	40.044– 40.677	64.445– 65.463	1	I-55 / US 61 / I-155 begins – St. Louis, Chicago, Memphis	West end of I-155 overlap; signed as exits 1A (south) & 1B (north). I-55 exits 17A-B.
Pemiscot	Caruthersville	46.813	75.338	6	Route 84 west / Route Y south – Caruthersville	
Mississippi River		50.767	81.702	Caruthersville Bridge; Missouri–Tennessee state line		
Mississippi River		50.767	81.702		I-155 east / US 412 east – Dyersburg	Continuation into Tennessee
1.000 mi = 1.609 km; 1.000 km = 0.621 mi: Concurrency terminus

== See also ==
U.S. Route 412
Previous state: Arkansas	Missouri	Next state: Tennessee
