= Leachville, Arkansas =

- City
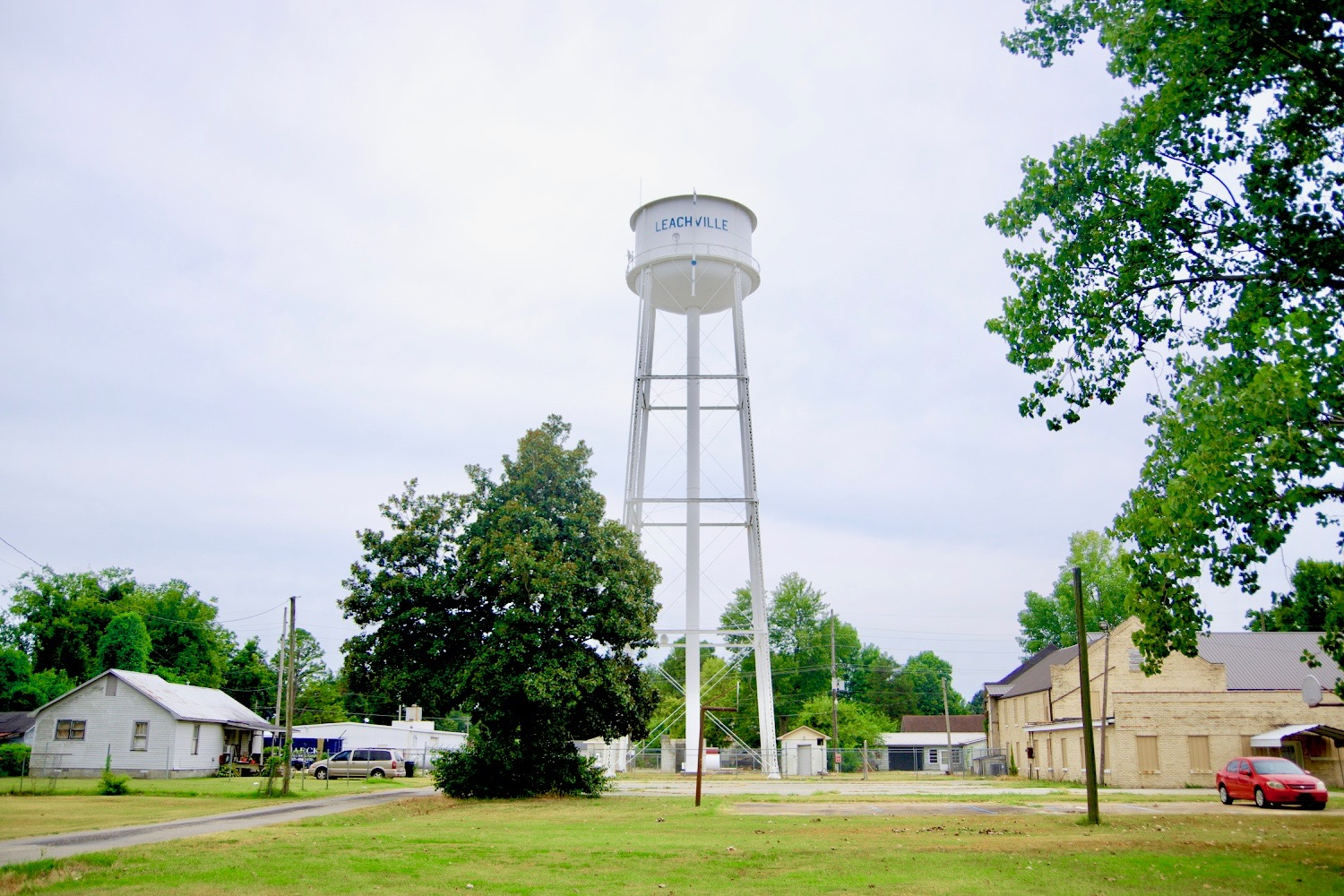

- Location in Mississippi County, Arkansas
- Coordinates: 35°54′35″N 90°15′18″W
- Country: United States
- State: Arkansas
- County: Mississippi
- Founded: 1896
- Incorporated: February 2, 1916
- Named for: Joshua Gilbert Leach

Area
  - Total: 4.40 sq mi (11.40 km^{2})
  - Land: 4.40 sq mi (11.40 km^{2})
  - Water: 0 sq mi (0.00 km^{2})
- Elevation: 233 ft (71 m)

Population (2020)
  - Total: 2,039
  - Estimate (2025): 1,883 ▼
  - Density: 463.1/sq mi (178.81/km^{2})
- Time zone: UTC-6 (Central (CST))
  - Summer (DST): UTC-5 (CDT)
- ZIP code: 72438
- Area code: 870
- FIPS code: 05-39010
- GNIS feature ID: 2404900
- Website: cityofleachvilleark.gov

Leachville is a city in Mississippi County, Arkansas, United States. The population was 2,039 at the 2020 census. Leachville was incorporated in 1916.

== History ==
Leachville was established in 1896 by land developers Joshua Gilbert Leach, James Wiseman Honnoll, and Sam McNamee, who afterward formed the Leach-McNamee Land Development Company.

The Jonesboro, Lake City and Eastern Railroad completed a rail line to Leachville in 1899, and the Blytheville, Leachville and Arkansas Southern Railroad completed a second line in 1908.

One of the largest cotton gins in Arkansas, the Adams Land Company gin, was completed in Leachville in the early 1990s.

On the evening of December 10, 2021, the north side of Leachville suffered major damage from a long track and violent EF4 tornado, a woman was killed at a Dollar General and several others suffered injuries.

== Geography ==
Leachville is located in the Arkansas Delta region. According to the United States Census Bureau, the city has a total area of 4.4 square miles (11 km^{2}), all land. The city lies just south of the Arkansas-Missouri state line in northwestern Mississippi County. Arkansas Highway 77 connects the city with Manila 8 miles (13 km) to the southeast and the state line 4 miles (6 km) to the north at Arkmo (where the road continues as Missouri Route 108 in the direction of Arbyrd, Missouri). Arkansas Highway 119 connects the city with the east-west oriented Arkansas Highway 18 to the south.

Ecologically, Leachville is located within the St. Francis Lowlands ecoregion within the larger Mississippi Alluvial Plain. The St. Francis Lowlands are a flat region mostly covered with row crop agriculture today, though also containing sand blows and sunken lands remaining from the 1811–12 New Madrid earthquakes. Waterways have mostly been channelized, causing loss of aquatic and riparian wildlife habitat. The Big Lake National Wildlife Refuge, which preserves some of the bottomland hardwood forest typical of this ecoregion prior to development for row agriculture lies east of Leachville.

== Demographics ==
Historical population
Census	Pop.	Note	%±
1930	1,157		—
1940	1,076		−7.0%
1950	1,230		14.3%
1960	1,507		22.5%
1970	1,582		5.0%
1980	1,882		19.0%
1990	1,743		−7.4%
2000	1,981		13.7%
2010	1,993		0.6%
2020	2,039		2.3%
2025 (est.)	1,883	▼	−7.7%
U.S. Decennial Census

=== 2020 census ===
As of the 2020 census, Leachville had a population of 2,039. The median age was 36.8 years. 26.9% of residents were under the age of 18 and 16.1% of residents were 65 years of age or older. For every 100 females there were 103.9 males, and for every 100 females age 18 and over there were 97.5 males age 18 and over.

0.0% of residents lived in urban areas, while 100.0% lived in rural areas.

There were 816 households in Leachville, of which 36.2% had children under the age of 18 living in them. Of all households, 44.1% were married-couple households, 19.6% were households with a male householder and no spouse or partner present, and 29.3% were households with a female householder and no spouse or partner present. About 30.0% of all households were made up of individuals and 14.7% had someone living alone who was 65 years of age or older.

There were 938 housing units, of which 13.0% were vacant. The homeowner vacancy rate was 0.7% and the rental vacancy rate was 12.7%.

Leachville racial composition
Race	Number	Percentage
White (non-Hispanic)	1,656	81.22%
Black or African American (non-Hispanic)	15	0.74%
Native American	3	0.15%
Asian	2	0.1%
Other/Mixed	97	4.76%
Hispanic or Latino	266	13.05%

=== 2010 census ===
As of the 2010 United States census, there were 1,993 people living in the city. The racial makeup of the city was 85.6% White, 0.3% Black, 0.2% Native American, 0.1% Asian and 1.3% from two or more races. 12.6% were Hispanic or Latino of any race.

=== 2000 census ===
As of the census of 2000, there were 1,981 people, 788 households, and 549 families living in the city. The population density was 1,069.6 inhabitants per square mile (413.0/km^{2}). There were 866 housing units at an average density of 467.6 per square mile (180.5/km^{2}). The racial makeup of the city was 92.88% White, 1.41% Black or African American, 0.30% Native American, 0.20% Asian, 4.04% from other races, and 1.16% from two or more races. 9.54% of the population were Hispanic or Latino of any race.

There were 788 households, out of which 32.0% had children under the age of 18 living with them, 56.6% were married couples living together, 10.2% had a female householder with no husband present, and 30.3% were non-families. 27.5% of all households were made up of individuals, and 16.5% had someone living alone who was 65 years of age or older. The average household size was 2.51 and the average family size was 3.07.

In the city, the population was spread out, with 27.3% under the age of 18, 8.2% from 18 to 24, 27.1% from 25 to 44, 22.0% from 45 to 64, and 15.4% who were 65 years of age or older. The median age was 36 years. For every 100 females, there were 93.3 males. For every 100 females age 18 and over, there were 87.6 males.

The median income for a household in the city was $25,789, and the median income for a family was $32,574. Males had a median income of $26,792 versus $17,083 for females. The per capita income for the city was $15,360. About 12.4% of families and 17.3% of the population were below the poverty line, including 19.9% of those under age 18 and 16.9% of those age 65 or over.

== Education ==
The Buffalo Island Central School District, which operates Buffalo Island Central High School and Buffalo Island Central Elementary School, serves Leachville. The school's mascot is the mustang.

The Buffalo Island Central School District was established on July 1, 1984. Until that point the Leachville School District served the community; on that day it merged with the Monette School District to form the current school district.
