= Let Go (Brother Phelps album) =

Studio album by Brother Phelps
- Released: August 3, 1993
- Genre: Country
- Label: Asylum
- Producer: Brother Phelps

Brother Phelps chronology
Let Go (1993)	Any Way the Wind Blows (1995)

Singles from Let Go
- 1. "Let Go" Released: June 14, 1993; 2. "Were You Really Livin'" Released: November 13, 1993

Professional ratings
Review scores
Source	Rating
AllMusic	3/5 stars
Entertainment Weekly	B

Let Go is the debut studio album by American country music duo Brother Phelps. The duo was formed by brothers Ricky Lee and Doug Phelps, both of whom had departed the country rock band The Kentucky Headhunters in 1993. The album's title track and debut single peaked at No. 6 on the Billboard country singles chart. "Were You Really Livin'", "Eagle over Angel", and "Ever-Changing Woman" were all released as singles, too. Richard Young, Fred Young, and Greg Martin of The Kentucky Headhunters co-wrote the track "Everything Will Work Out Fine."

== Track listing ==
Let Go track listing
No.	Title	Writer(s)	Length
1.	"Let Go"	Dickie Brown	3:37
2.	"What Goes Around"	Ricky Lee Phelps, Doug Phelps	3:27
3.	"Were You Really Livin'"	R. L. Phelps, D. Phelps	2:46
4.	"Ever-Changing Woman"	Dave Kirby, Curly Putman	3:24
5.	"Hot Water"	P. R. Battle	3:16
6.	"Everything Will Work Out Fine"	Greg Martin, D. Phelps, R. L. Phelps, Fred Young, Richard Young	2:53
7.	"Inside Outside"	R. L. Phelps, D. Phelps	2:48
8.	"Playin' House"	R. L. Phelps, D. Phelps	3:20
9.	"Four Leaf Clover"	George Hawke	2:47
10.	"Eagle over Angel"	Gerald Guinn, Yvonne Guinn, James H. Peters	3:36
11.	"Watch Your Step"	R. L. Phelps, D. Phelps	3:59

== Personnel ==
- Mike Brignardello – bass guitar
- Sam Bush – mandolin
- Larry Byrom – electric guitar
- Paul Franklin – steel guitar
- Jim Horn – horns
- John Hughey – steel guitar
- Martin Kickliter – drums
- Albert Lee – electric guitar
- Paul Leim – drums
- Nashville String Machine – strings
- Doug Phelps – background vocals, acoustic guitar, 12-string guitar, harmonica
- Ricky Lee Phelps – lead vocals, tambourine
- Richard Ripani – piano, Hammond organ
- Billy Joe Walker, Jr. – rhythm guitar
- Glenn Worf – bass guitar

== Charts ==
Chart (1993)	Peak position
U.S. Billboard Top Country Albums	56
U.S. Billboard Top Heatseekers	21
