= Braggadocio, Missouri =

Unincorporated community in Missouri, U.S.

Coordinates: 36°10′31″N 89°49′46″W

Braggadocio is an unincorporated community in Pemiscot County, Missouri, United States. It is located 8 miles (13 km) west of Caruthersville on Missouri Route J and 5.5 miles (8.9 km) north of Steele on Route Z.

== History ==
Braggadocio was founded circa 1847. A post office called Braggadocio has been in operation since 1881. Possibly the community was named because a large share of the early settlers were braggarts, or after the knight and horse thief Sir Braggadoccio, in Edmund Spenser's The Faerie Queene. Braggadocio has been noted for its unusual place name.

In 1927, an African-American man named Will Sherod was lynched in Braggadocio.

On April 2, 2006, an F3 tornado hit the town, causing two deaths, and on December 10, 2021, an EF4 tornado struck the town, causing one death.
