= Lynching of Will Sherod =

Lynching of a Black man in Missouri, 1927

Coordinates: 36°10′31″N 89°49′46″W

Will Sherod (c. 1896–1897 – May 22, 1927) was a Black man who was lynched in Braggadocio, Missouri, on May 22, 1927, following the alleged assault of a woman.

== Lynching ==
On May 21, 1927, Ella Hendershot, a 31-year-old widow with two children, was assaulted. That night, she called a police constable and described the perpetrator. Her description led the police to suspect Will Sherod, a 30-year-old Black man. The following day, during their attempt to arrest him, Sherod attempted to flee apprehension, prompting an officer to fire two shots, one hitting his right arm and the other hitting his right shoulder. He was taken to the county jail in nearby Caruthersville.

At around 10 o'clock on May 22, a mob of 20 men from Braggadocio abducted Sherod and brought him back to the town. A half-hour later, they had hanged him in the town square on temporary scaffolding, with about twelve bullet piercings on his body. Sherod was left there until the following morning, when county officers came to investigate the matter.

== Aftermath ==
No members of the mob were ever brought to justice. The sheriff claimed that most of the members of the mob wore masks, and he couldn't recognize the ones who didn't. No witnesses ever came forward to identify mob members.

== See also ==
- List of lynching victims in the United States
