= Southland C-9 School District =

School district in Missouri, U.S.

Southland C-9 School District is a public school located in the southernmost portion of the Missouri Bootheel in Dunklin County. It is a consolidated school district made up of the towns of Arbyrd and Cardwell, as well as the Hollywood census-designated place.

The Southland C-9 school district is composed of preschool through twelfth grade with all grades located on one general campus.

Sports offered at Southland include Boys basketball and baseball as well as Girls volleyball, softball, cheerleading, and basketball. Southland's school mascot is a Confederate style rebel man and the school colors are red, gray, and white.
