= John Hardeman Walker =

American judge

John Hardeman Walker (March 3, 1794 – April 30, 1860) was an early landowner in southeast Missouri, most famous for convincing the United States Congress to place the Bootheel in Missouri instead of Arkansas.

Walker was born in Fayette County, Tennessee. He moved to the Bootheel area in 1810 and settled at Little Prairie, near what is now known as Caruthersville in Pemiscot County. When many citizens of the area left after the New Madrid earthquakes of 1811–12, Walker maintained his cattle operation in the area and steadily increased his holdings.

When Missouri was added to the Union, its original border proposal in 1818 was to be an extension of the 36°30' parallel north that formed the border between Kentucky and Tennessee, which would have excluded the Bootheel. However, Walker argued that the area had more in common with the Mississippi River towns of Cape Girardeau, Ste. Genevieve and St. Louis in Missouri than with its proposed location in Arkansas Territory. The border was then dropped about 50 miles to the 36th parallel north. It follows that parallel about 30 miles until it intersects the St. Francis River, then follows the river back up to about the 36°30' parallel just west of Campbell, Missouri.

Walker served as sheriff of New Madrid County in 1821–22 and later served as a county court judge in Pemiscot County. After the 1851 formation of Pemiscot County from New Madrid County, Walker helped to lay out the town of Caruthersville in 1857 and died there in 1860.
