= Missouri Route 108 =

State highway in Missouri, U.S.

Route 108
- Route 108 highlighted in red

Route information
- Maintained by MoDOT
- Length: 5.709 mi (9.188 km)
- Existed: c. 1930–present

Major junctions
- West end: AR 77 in Arkmo
- Route 164 in Arbyrd
- East end: US 412 near Arbyrd

Location
- Country: United States
- State: Missouri
- Counties: Dunklin

Highway system
- Missouri State Highway System; Interstate; US; State; Supplemental
← Route 107	→ Route 109

Route 108 is a short highway in the Bootheel of southeastern Missouri. Its eastern terminus is the Arkansas state line at Arkansas Highway 77, about six miles (10 km) south of Arbyrd, the only town on the route. Its western terminus is at U.S. Route 412 (US 412) about two miles (3 km) north of Arbyrd. Although signed as an east–west route, the route follows mostly north–south roadways. The route was designated in 1930, and was extended east in 1972.

== Route description ==
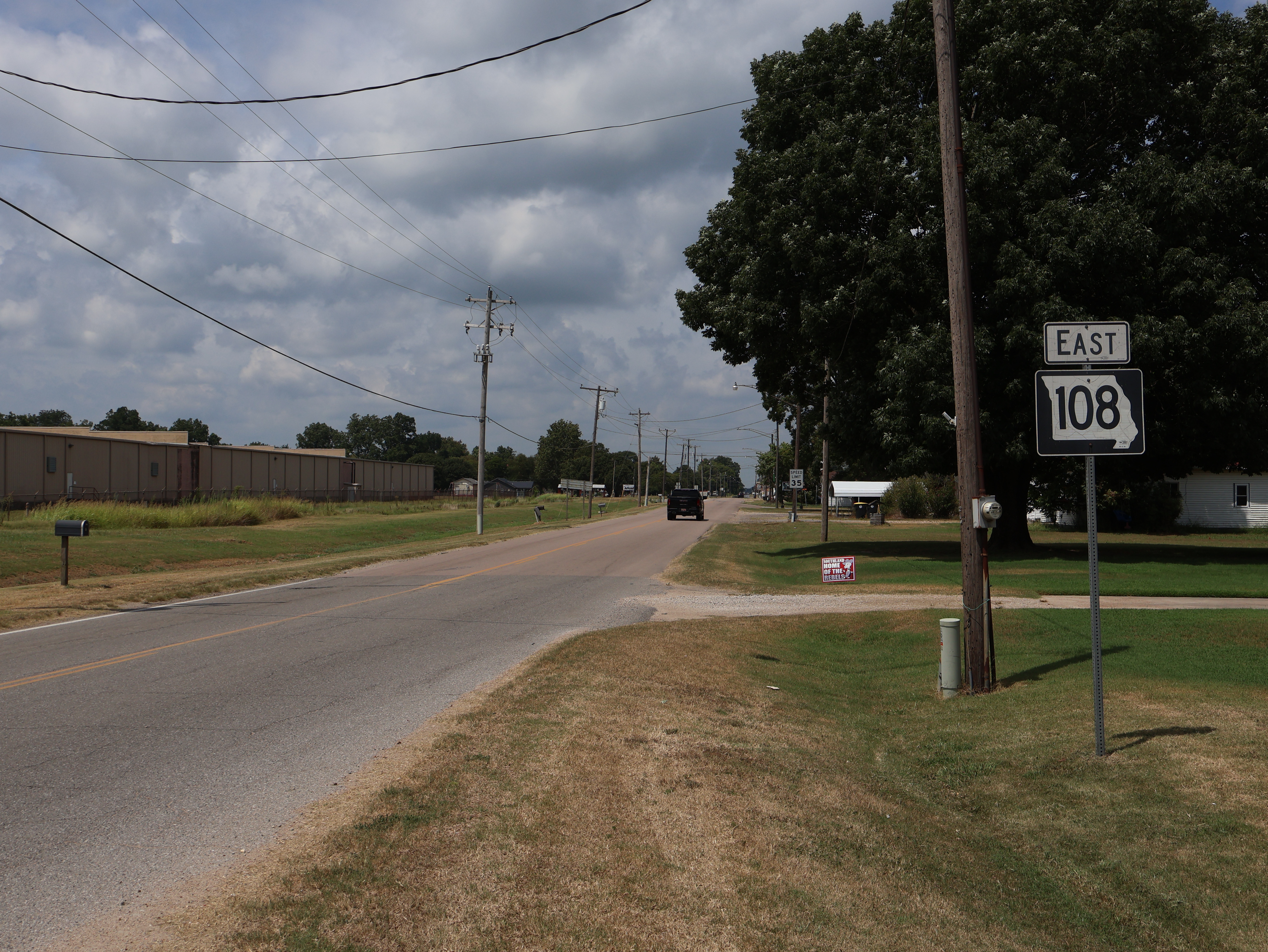
Stretch of Route 108 near Arbyrd

Route 108 begins at the Arkansas state line in Arkmo, Dunklin County, where the road continues south into that state as Highway 77. From the Arkansas-Missouri state line, the route heads north as a two-lane undivided road, passing a few homes and businesses in Arkmo before running through farmland. The road continues through rural areas to the southern edge of Arbyrd, where it reaches an intersection with Route 164. At this point, Route 108 turns east to form a concurrency with Route 164, with the two routes passing through more fields before running to the south of industry. Route 108 splits from Route 164 by heading north on East Frisco Street, passing homes and a few businesses. Route 108 leaves Arbyrd and heads through more agricultural areas before reaching its eastern terminus at US 412. In 2012, Missouri Department of Transportation (MoDOT) calculated 1,057 vehicles traveling north of the state line. This is expressed in terms of annual average daily traffic (AADT), a measure of traffic volume for any average day of the year.

== History ==
Route 108 was designated in 1930, connecting from the state line to Route 25. The road was already paved in gravel. Three years later, Route Y was designated, and it connected from Route 108 in Arbyrd to Caruth. In 1936, Route 108 was repaved in concrete. By 1953, Route 25 was rerouted into Arbyrd, becoming the terminus of Routes 108 and Y there. Route 164 was designated in 1956, replacing a large section of Route Y from Route 108 to Route N. Fifteen years later, Route 25 was rerouted to the west, and the old alignment, from Route 246, through Arbyrd, became part of Route 108. Around 1983, US 412 was designated, replacing Route 25 from Kennett to the state line.

== Major intersections ==
The entire route is in Dunklin County.

Location	mi	km	Destinations	Notes
Arkmo	0.000	0.000	AR 77 south	Arkansas state line
Arbyrd	3.418	5.501	Route 164 west	South end of Route 164 overlap
Arbyrd	3.902	6.280	Route 164 east	North end of Route 164 overlap
Arbyrd	5.709	9.188	US 412	
1.000 mi = 1.609 km; 1.000 km = 0.621 mi: Concurrency terminus
