= Let Go (Brother Phelps song) =

Single by Brother Phelps

from the album Let Go
- B-side: "Everything Will Work Out Fine"
- Released: June 14, 1993
- Genre: Country
- Length: 3:37
- Label: Asylum
- Songwriter: Dickie Brown
- Producer: Brother Phelps

Brother Phelps singles chronology
"Let Go" (1993)	"Were You Really Livin'" (1993)

"Let Go" is a song written by Dickie Brown and recorded by American country music duo Brother Phelps. It was released in June 1993 as the first single and title track from their debut album Let Go. The song reached number 6 on the Billboard Hot Country Singles & Tracks chart in October 1993.

== Content ==
Dickie Brown, a friend of the Phelps brothers, wrote the song around 1989. He said that he was inspired to write it after thinking about "close friends" who were "hurting". The song is in the key of G major with a chord pattern of G-C-D.

== Music video ==
The music video was directed by Steven T. Miller and R. Brad Murano and premiered in mid-1993.

== Chart performance ==
"Let's Go" debuted at number 68 on the U.S. Billboard Hot Country Singles & Tracks for the week of July 3, 1993.

Chart (1993)	Peak position
Canada Country Singles (RPM)	8
US Hot Country Songs (Billboard)	6

=== Year-end charts ===
Chart (1993)	Position
US Country Songs (Billboard)	71
