= Cardwell, Missouri =

- City
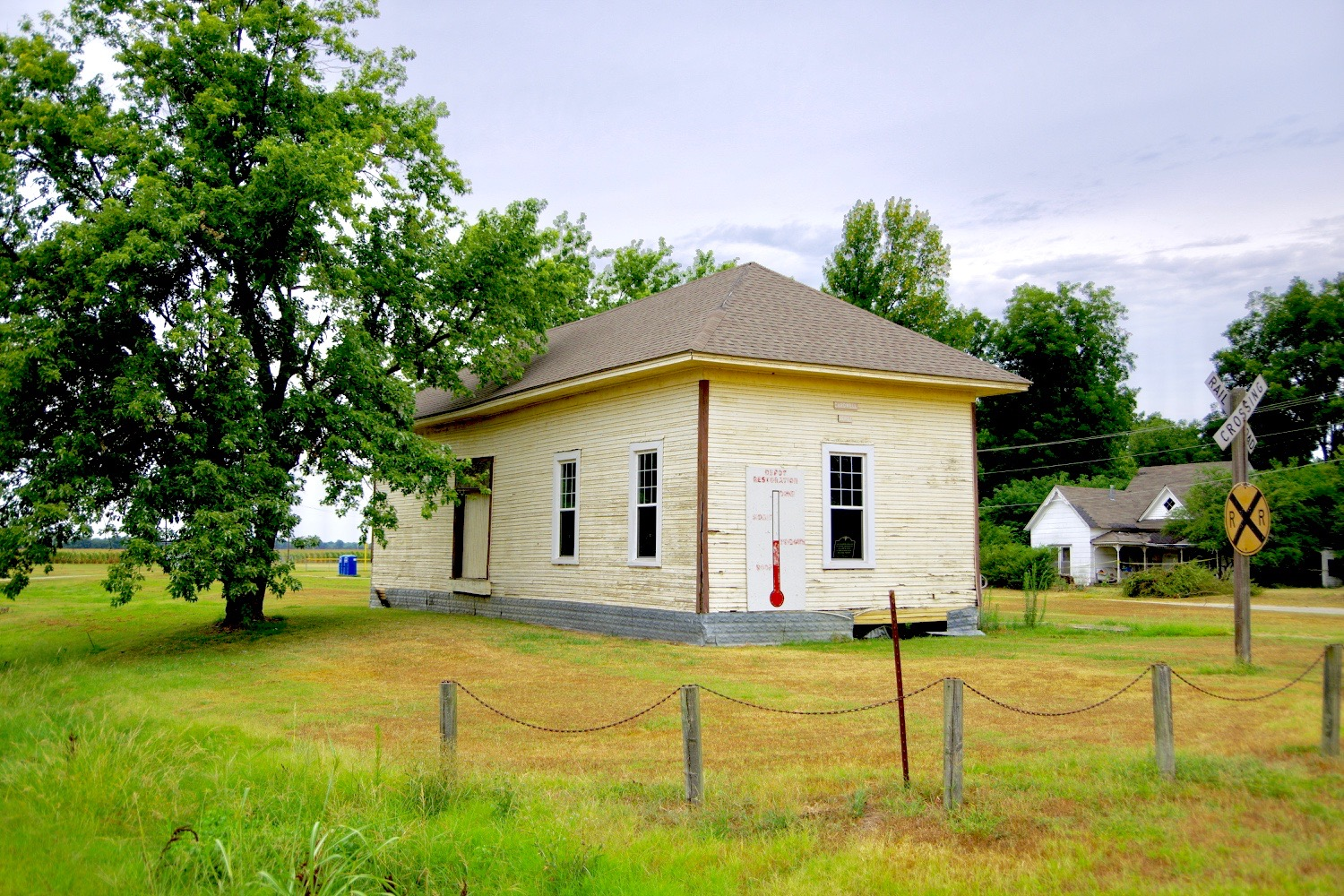
- Cotton Belt Depot in Cardwell, MO

- Location of Cardwell, Missouri
- Coordinates: 36°2′50″N 90°17′33″W
- Country: United States
- State: Missouri
- County: Dunklin
- First settled: 1895
- Incorporated: 1904
- Named for: Frank Cardwell

Government
  - Mayor: Denise Latting

Area
  - Total: 0.63 sq mi (1.63 km^{2})
  - Land: 0.63 sq mi (1.63 km^{2})
  - Water: 0 sq mi (0.00 km^{2})
- Elevation: 249 ft (76 m)

Population (2020)
  - Total: 561
  - Density: 890.7/sq mi (343.92/km^{2})
- Time zone: UTC-6 (Central (CST))
  - Summer (DST): UTC-5 (CDT)
- ZIP code: 63829
- Area code: 573
- FIPS code: 29-11350
- GNIS feature ID: 2393741

Cardwell is a city in southwest Dunklin County, Missouri, United States. The 2024 recorded population is 526. The community was named after Frank Cardwell, an Arkansas banker who lent money to the town's founders. The current mayor of Cardwell is Denise Latting and the current aldermen are Cody Todd, Dustin Lee and Winnia Cohea. Lisa Vowels serves as the City Clerk.

== History ==
On January 1, 1893, the Paragould Southeastern Railway, originally a tramway, began construction to extend its mainline from Paragould, Arkansas eastward into the Missouri Bootheel. By November 1894, the line had been graded to the new townsite and it was being advertised in local papers that plotts were being sold. On January 19, 1895, the first train was reported to have arrived in Cardwell, and platting continued into the following year by the Bertig family of Paragould, AR, and a post office was established soon after. A school district was established for Cardwell in 1899, and that July a contract was let for the construction of a two story brick school building.

In 1902, the Paragould and Memphis Railroad, a "tap line" built a link between Cardwell and Manila, AR. This line was mostly used to haul lumber. In 1904, the city of Cardwell was formally incorporated.

== Geography ==
Cardwell is situated in the southwestern corner of Missouri's Bootheel, with the Missouri-Arkansas state line lying both to the west and south. Missouri Route 164 traverses Cardwell, connecting the city with Arbyrd and Hornersville to the east. U.S. Route 412 passes just south and east of Cardwell. Paragould, Arkansas is ten miles to the west on Route 412. The St. Francis River follows the state line two miles to the west of the community.

According to the United States Census Bureau, the city has a total area of 0.63 square miles (1.63 km^{2}), all land.

== Climate ==
Cardwell experiences a humid subtropical climate, with hot summers and generally cold winters.

Climate data for Cardwell, Missouri
Month	Jan	Feb	Mar	Apr	May	Jun	Jul	Aug	Sep	Oct	Nov	Dec	Year
Mean daily maximum °F (°C)	46 (8)	51 (11)	61 (16)	71 (22)	80 (27)	88 (31)	91 (33)	90 (32)	84 (29)	73 (23)	60 (16)	49 (9)	70 (21)
Mean daily minimum °F (°C)	29 (−2)	33 (1)	41 (5)	50 (10)	60 (16)	68 (20)	71 (22)	70 (21)	62 (17)	50 (10)	40 (4)	32 (0)	51 (10)
Average precipitation inches (mm)	3.3 (84)	4.1 (100)	4.7 (120)	5.2 (130)	5.2 (130)	3.5 (89)	3.8 (97)	3.4 (86)	3.2 (81)	4.3 (110)	5.0 (130)	4.9 (120)	50.6 (1,277)
Source: https://www.ncdc.noaa.gov

== Demographics ==
Historical population
Census	Pop.	Note	%±
1900	502		—
1910	874		74.1%
1920	1,043		19.3%
1930	861		−17.4%
1940	913		6.0%
1950	952		4.3%
1960	816		−14.3%
1970	859		5.3%
1980	831		−3.3%
1990	792		−4.7%
2000	789		−0.4%
2010	713		−9.6%
2020	561		−21.3%

=== 2010 census ===
As of the census of 2010, there were 713 people, 317 households, and 180 families residing in the city. The population density was 1,131.7 inhabitants per square mile (437.0/km^{2}). There were 386 housing units at an average density of 612.7 per square mile (236.6/km^{2}). The racial makeup of the city was 96.35% White, 0.42% Black or African American, 0.28% Native American, 1.12% from other races, and 1.82% from two or more races. Hispanic or Latino of any race were 3.37% of the population.

There were 317 households, of which 30.6% had children under the age of 18 living with them, 31.5% were married couples living together, 17.0% had a female householder with no husband present, 8.2% had a male householder with no wife present, and 43.2% were non-families. 36.0% of all households were made up of individuals, and 12.6% had someone living alone who was 65 years of age or older. The average household size was 2.25 and the average family size was 2.95.

The median age in the city was 39.5 years. 25% of residents were under the age of 18; 9.1% were between the ages of 18 and 24; 24.2% were from 25 to 44; 25.1% were from 45 to 64; and 16.5% were 65 years of age or older. The gender makeup of the city was 50.2% male and 49.8% female.

=== 2000 census ===
As of the census of 2000, there were 789 people, 345 households, and 218 families residing in the city. The population density was 1,246.1 inhabitants per square mile (481.1/km^{2}). There were 387 housing units at an average density of 611.2 per square mile (236.0/km^{2}). The racial makeup of the city was 97.34% White, 0.89% African American, 0.63% Native American, and 1.14% from two or more races. Hispanic or Latino of any race were 1.01% of the population.

There were 345 households, out of which 29.6% had children under the age of 18 living with them, 45.5% were married couples living together, 13.3% had a female householder with no husband present, and 36.8% were non-families. 33.6% of all households were made up of individuals, and 16.5% had someone living alone who was 65 years of age or older. The average household size was 2.29 and the average family size was 2.92.

In the city the population was spread out, with 24.3% under the age of 18, 7.5% from 18 to 24, 28.6% from 25 to 44, 22.6% from 45 to 64, and 17.0% who were 65 years of age or older. The median age was 39 years. For every 100 females, there were 88.3 males. For every 100 females age 18 and over, there were 86.0 males.

The median income for a household in the city was $21,042, and the median income for a family was $27,361. Males had a median income of $25,179 versus $19,500 for females. The per capita income for the city was $12,207. About 25.1% of families and 27.0% of the population were below the poverty line, including 34.0% of those under age 18 and 22.7% of those age 65 or over.

== Education ==
Southland C-9 School District, which covers the municipality, operates two schools in Cardwell: Southland Elementary School and Southland High School.

Cardwell has a public library, a branch of the Dunklin County Library.
