= Buffalo Island Central School District =

School district in Arkansas, United States

Location
- 801 West Drew; Monette, Arkansas 72447 United States

District information
- Grades: PK–12
- Established: 1984
- Accreditation: AdvancED
- Schools: 2
- NCES District ID: 0503710

Students and staff
- Students: 875
- Teachers: 70.10 (on FTE basis)
- Student–teacher ratio: 12.48
- Athletic conference: 2A Region 3 (2012–14)
- District mascot: Mustangs
- Colors: Navy Blue; Silver

Other information
- 8705307464
- Website: www.buffaloislandcentral.com

Buffalo Island Central School District (or BIC) is a public school district based in Monette, Arkansas, United States. The Buffalo Island Central School District provides early childhood, elementary and secondary education for more than 850 prekindergarten through grade 12 students at its four northeast Arkansas facilities at Monette in Craighead County and Leachville in Mississippi County.

Buffalo Island Central School District's two schools are accredited by the Arkansas Department of Education (ADE) and AdvancED.

== History ==
It was established on July 1, 1984, by the merger of the Leachville School District and the Monette School District.

== Schools ==
- Buffalo Island Central High School—serving more than 150 students in grades 10 through 12 in Monette, Craighead County.
- Buffalo Island Central Junior High School—serving more than 180 students in grades 7 through 9 in Leachville, Mississippi County.
- Buffalo Island Central West Elementary School—serving approximately 250 students in pre-kindergarten through grade 6 in Monette, Craighead County.
- Buffalo Island Central East Elementary School—serving approximately 275 students in pre-kindergarten through grade 6 in Leachville, Mississippi County.
