= Anyway the Wind Blows =

Studio album by Brother Phelps
- Released: March 7, 1995
- Genre: Country
- Label: Asylum
- Producer: Brother Phelps; Kyle Lehning

Brother Phelps chronology
Let Go (1993)	Anyway the Wind Blows (1995)

Professional ratings
Review scores
Source	Rating
AllMusic	4/5 stars
Entertainment Weekly	B

Anyway the Wind Blows is the second and final studio album by American country music duo Brother Phelps. After its release, Doug re-joined country rock band The Kentucky Headhunters, of which he and Ricky Lee were both members previous to Brother Phelps' inception. This album produced singles in its title track and "Not So Different After All", although neither charted in the Top 40 on the Billboard country charts. The title track was originally recorded by J. J. Cale on his 1974 album Okie. The track "Ragtop" was previously recorded by The Kentucky Headhunters on their 1989 debut album Pickin' on Nashville, while "Cinderella" is a cover of a song originally released by the rock band Firefall. "Down into Muddy Water" would later be recorded by Shelly Fairchild on her 2004 debut album Ride.

== Track listing ==
1. "Anyway the Wind Blows" (J. J. Cale) - 3:09
2. "Down into Muddy Water" (Dennis Linde) - 3:46
3. "Mary Ann Is a Pistol" (Linde) - 3:10
4. "Not So Different After All" (Jeff Hughes, Irene Kelly) - 3:24
5. "Walls" (Mary Ann Kennedy, Pam Rose) - 3:08
6. "Cinderella" (Larry Burnett) - 3:04
7. "I Ain't Ever Satisfied" (Steve Earle) - 3:51
8. "Ragtop" (Ricky Lee Phelps, Doug Phelps) - 3:14
9. "The Other Kind" (Earle) - 4:30
10. "Johnny" (R. L. Phelps, D. Phelps) - 3:30
11. "Lookout Mountain" (Linde) - 4:27

== Personnel ==
- Al Anderson - electric guitar
- Mike Brignardello - bass guitar
- Larry Byrom - electric guitar
- Dan Dugmore - steel guitar
- Paul Leim - drums, percussion, washboard
- Doug Phelps - vocals
- Ricky Lee Phelps - vocals
- Richard Ripani - organ, piano
- Hank Singer - fiddle
- Billy Joe Walker, Jr. - electric guitar

== Chart performance ==
Chart (1995)	Peak position
U.S. Billboard Top Country Albums	43
U.S. Billboard Top Heatseekers	24
