= Arkmo, Arkansas and Missouri =

Arkmo
- Unincorporated community
- Location of Arkmo in Arkansas, with Missouri to the north Arkmo (the United States)
- Coordinates: 35°59′48″N 90°14′51″W
- Country: United States
- States: Arkansas and Missouri
- County: Mississippi (Arkansas) and Dunklin (Missouri)
- Elevation: 243 ft (74 m)
- Time zone: UTC-6 (Central (CST))
  - Summer (DST): UTC-5 (CDT)
- GNIS feature ID: 61892

Arkmo is an unincorporated community located in both Mississippi County, Arkansas and Dunklin County, Missouri, United States. Arkmo is situated at the junction of Arkansas Highway 77 and Missouri Route 108, 3.5 miles (5.6 km) south of Arbyrd; the community primarily lies on the Missouri side of the border.
