= Hollywood, Missouri =

- Census-designated place
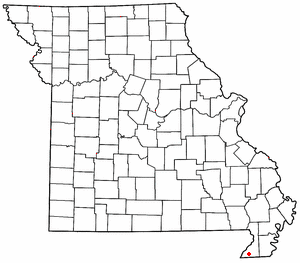
- Location of Hollywood in Missouri
- Coordinates: 36°03′05″N 90°11′10″W
- Country: United States
- State: Missouri
- County: Dunklin

Area
  - Total: 0.38 sq mi (0.99 km^{2})
  - Land: 0.38 sq mi (0.99 km^{2})
  - Water: 0 sq mi (0.00 km^{2})
- Elevation: 246 ft (75 m)

Population (2020)
  - Total: 24
  - Density: 63/sq mi (24.2/km^{2})
- FIPS code: 29-32698
- GNIS feature ID: 2806397

Hollywood is an unincorporated community in southern Dunklin County, Missouri, United States. It is located less than one mile from Route 164, approximately twelve miles south of Kennett.

Hollywood got its start ca. 1898 when the railroad was extended to that point. The community was named for the holly near the original town site. A post office called Hollywood was established in 1898, and remained in operation until 1974.

== Demographics ==
Historical population
Census	Pop.	Note	%±
2020	24		—
U.S. Decennial Census

Hollywood first appeared as a census designated place in the 2020 U.S. census.

== Education ==
It is in the Southland C-9 School District.
