= Rives, Missouri =

- Village
- Location of Rives, Missouri
- Coordinates: 36°5′40″N 90°0′41″W
- Country: United States
- State: Missouri
- County: Dunklin

Area
  - Total: 0.37 sq mi (0.95 km^{2})
  - Land: 0.37 sq mi (0.95 km^{2})
  - Water: 0 sq mi (0.00 km^{2})
- Elevation: 243 ft (74 m)

Population (2020)
  - Total: 42
  - Density: 115.0/sq mi (44.42/km^{2})
- Time zone: UTC-6 (Central (CST))
  - Summer (DST): UTC-5 (CDT)
- ZIP code: 63875
- Area code: 573
- FIPS code: 29-62228
- GNIS feature ID: 2396882

Rives is a town in Dunklin County, Missouri, United States. The population was 42 at the 2020 census.

== History ==
Rives had its start in 1894 when the railroad was extended to that point. A post office called Rives has been in operation since 1915. The village has the name of Colonel H. W. Rives, a railroad official.

== Geography ==
Rives is located at 36°5′49″N 90°0′54″W (36.097025, -90.015094).

According to the United States Census Bureau, the village has a total area of 0.37 square miles (0.96 km^{2}), all land.

== Demographics ==
Historical population
Census	Pop.	Note	%±
2000	88		—
2010	63		−28.4%
2020	42		−33.3%
U.S. Decennial Census

=== 2010 census ===
As of the census of 2010, there were 63 people, 30 households, and 18 families living in the village. The population density was 170.3 inhabitants per square mile (65.8/km^{2}). There were 35 housing units at an average density of 94.6 per square mile (36.5/km^{2}). The racial makeup of the village was 100.0% White.

There were 30 households, of which 20.0% had children under the age of 18 living with them, 40.0% were married couples living together, 16.7% had a female householder with no husband present, 3.3% had a male householder with no wife present, and 40.0% were non-families. 30.0% of all households were made up of individuals, and 10% had someone living alone who was 65 years of age or older. The average household size was 2.10 and the average family size was 2.44.

The median age in the village was 49.8 years. 15.9% of residents were under the age of 18; 6.3% were between the ages of 18 and 24; 17.5% were from 25 to 44; 39.7% were from 45 to 64; and 20.6% were 65 years of age or older. The gender makeup of the village was 52.4% male and 47.6% female.

=== 2000 census ===
As of the census of 2000, there were 88 people, 38 households, and 25 families living in the town. The population density was 222.1 inhabitants per square mile (85.8/km^{2}). There were 39 housing units at an average density of 98.4 per square mile (38.0/km^{2}). The racial makeup of the town was 90.91% White, 5.68% from other races, and 3.41% from two or more races. Hispanic or Latino of any race were 9.09% of the population.

There were 38 households, out of which 31.6% had children under the age of 18 living with them, 57.9% were married couples living together, 5.3% had a female householder with no husband present, and 31.6% were non-families. 28.9% of all households were made up of individuals, and 18.4% had someone living alone who was 65 years of age or older. The average household size was 2.32 and the average family size was 2.85.

In the town the population was spread out, with 25.0% under the age of 18, 8.0% from 18 to 24, 19.3% from 25 to 44, 27.3% from 45 to 64, and 20.5% who were 65 years of age or older. The median age was 44 years. For every 100 females, there were 83.3 males. For every 100 females age 18 and over, there were 83.3 males.

The median income for a household in the town was $28,125, and the median income for a family was $36,563. Males had a median income of $25,417 versus $24,375 for females. The per capita income for the town was $12,111. There were 4.0% of families and 18.7% of the population living below the poverty line, including 25.0% of under eighteens and 53.3% of those over 64.

== Education ==
It is in the Senath-Hornersville C-8 School District.
