= Buffalo Island Central High School =

Location
- 803 Drew Avenue; Monette, Arkansas 72447; United States; 35°53′23″N 90°21′4″W

Information
- School type: Public (government funded)
- Status: Open
- School district: Buffalo Island Central School District
- NCES District ID: 0503710
- Authority: Arkansas Department of Education (ADE)
- CEEB code: 041680
- NCES School ID: 050371001271
- Teaching staff: 33.29 (FTE)
- Grades: 7-12
- Enrollment: 325 (2023-2024)
- Student to teacher ratio: 9.76
- Education system: ADE Smart Core curriculum
- Colors: Navy blue and silver
- Athletics conference: 2A 3 (Basketball) Conference (2012-14)
- Sports: Basketball (boys/girls), track (boys/girls),
- Mascot: Mustang horse
- Nickname: BIC
- Team name: Buffalo Island Central Mustangs
- Newspaper: Hoof Prints
- Yearbook: Mustang Yearly
- Communities served: Monette and Blue Island area
- Feeder schools: Buffalo Island Central Junior High School (5-8)
- Affiliation: Arkansas Activities Association
- Website: hs.bicschools.net

Buffalo Island Central High School (or BIC) is a comprehensive public high school serving students in grades seven through twelve in Monette, Arkansas, United States. It serves the Buffalo Island area in Craighead County and is the sole high school administered by the Buffalo Island Central School District with its elementary school located in Leachville. In 2010, two administrators were recognized as Administrators of the Year by the Arkansas Scholastic Press Association (ASPA).

== Curriculum ==
The assumed course of study for BIC students is the Smart Core curriculum developed the Arkansas Department of Education (ADE), which requires students to complete 22 credit units before graduation. Students engage in regular and Advanced Placement (AP) coursework and exams.

== Extracurricular activities ==
The Buffalo Island Central High School mascot is the Mustang with school colors are navy blue and silver. The Buffalo Island Central Mustangs participate in various interscholastic activities in the 2A 3 (Basketball) Conference administered by the Arkansas Activities Association. The school athletic activities include basketball (boys/girls), cross country (boys/girls), soccer (boys only), track (boys/girls), golf (boys/girls), baseball, and softball.

In 2012 and 2015, the Lady Mustangs were Class 2A state finalists in softball.

In 2013, the boys golf team were the 2A State Champions, placing two individuals in the overall tournament.

Buffalo Island Central's journalism program has been recognized on the local, state and national level. Students in the program frequently win recognition at the Arkansas Scholastic Press Association's annual conventions. In 2013 and 2014, journalism staff members won nine Quill and Scroll National Yearbook Excellence Gold Keys and two Sweepstakes awards, and students won awards at the Journalism Education Association's national conventions in both 2013 and 2014.

Buffalo Island Central High School also has extracurricular programs including but not limited to the Future Farmers of America (FFA) chapter, the Education Accelerated by Service and Technology (EAST) Initiative, and others.
