= Steele, Missouri =

- City
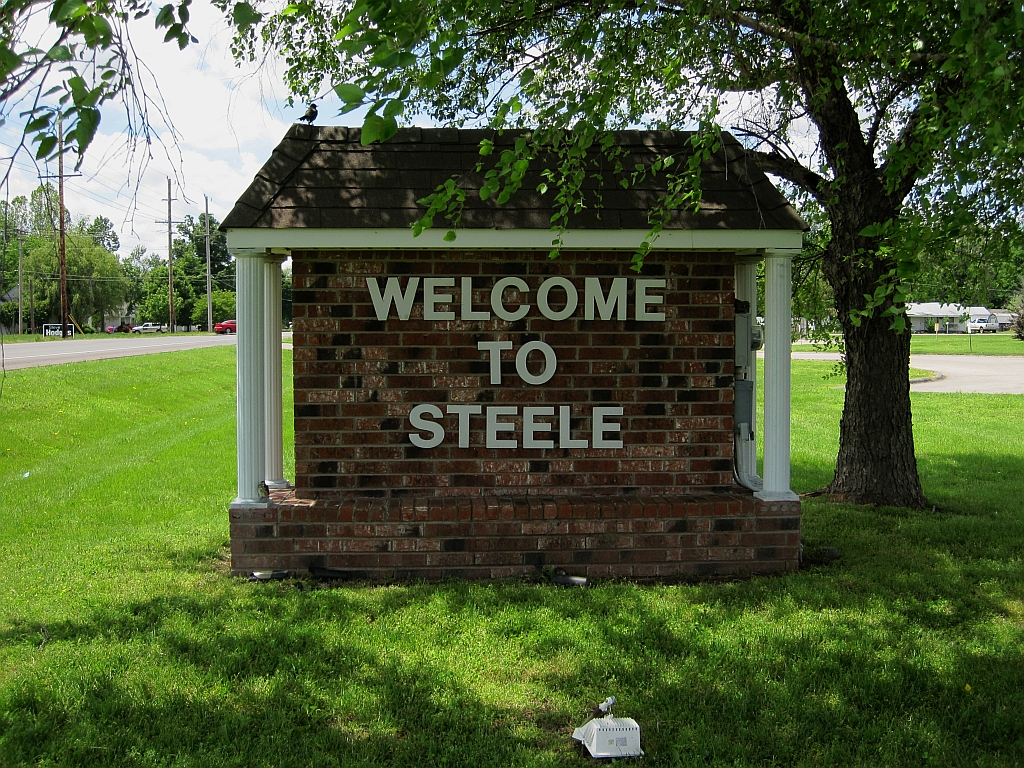

- Location of Steele, Missouri
- Coordinates: 36°04′54″N 89°50′09″W
- Country: United States
- State: Missouri
- County: Pemiscot
- Named for: Leonidas Lucilius Steele (1845–1907)

Area
  - Total: 2.19 sq mi (5.67 km^{2})
  - Land: 2.16 sq mi (5.60 km^{2})
  - Water: 0.027 sq mi (0.07 km^{2})
- Elevation: 259 ft (79 m)

Population (2020)
  - Total: 1,853
  - Density: 856.9/sq mi (330.85/km^{2})
- Time zone: UTC-6 (Central (CST))
  - Summer (DST): UTC-5 (CDT)
- ZIP code: 63877
- Area code: 573
- FIPS code: 29-70558
- GNIS feature ID =: 2395961

Steele is a city in southern Pemiscot County in the Missouri Bootheel of southeastern Missouri, United States. The population was 1,853 at the 2020 census.

== History ==
The Steele post office was in operation from 1896 to 2017. The community was named for Leonidas Lucilius Steele, an early settler who came to Pemiscot County in 1874 and moved to Steele in 1885, where he operated a hotel and mercantile business. The city's early growth was due to it being the only way for people and freight to cross the Little River Swamp to reach Cottonwood Point and the Mississippi River. The community was a point along the St. Louis–San Francisco Railway. In 1912, Steele contained seven general stores, three cotton gins, a sawmill and a gristmill.

In 1942, an auxiliary field was constructed by the US Army northwest of the city. This was one of four auxiliary fields that served Blytheville Army Airfield, a B-25 pilot training school in Blytheville, Arkansas. In August 1946, the Blytheville base and its auxiliary facilities (including the field at Steele) were declared surplus property. Local James K. Burton obtained a fiver year lease on the field to operate a flying school on the property.

== Geography ==
Steele is located in southern Pemiscot County, approximately five miles north of the Missouri-Arkansas state line. The community is on Missouri Route 164 and U.S. Route 61. Interstate 55 passes just to the east of the city. Caruthersville is on the Mississippi River, eleven miles northeast of Steele.

According to the United States Census Bureau, the city has a total area of 1.87 square miles (4.84 km^{2}), of which 1.84 square miles (4.77 km^{2}) is land and 0.03 square miles (0.08 km^{2}) is water.

== Demographics ==
Historical population
Census	Pop.	Note	%±
1910	833		—
1920	751		−9.8%
1930	1,219		62.3%
1940	1,585		30.0%
1950	2,360		48.9%
1960	2,301		−2.5%
1970	2,107		−8.4%
1980	2,419		14.8%
1990	2,395		−1.0%
2000	2,263		−5.5%
2010	2,172		−4.0%
2020	1,853		−14.7%
U.S. Decennial Census

=== 2020 census ===
As of the 2020 census, Steele had a population of 1,853. The median age was 37.2 years. 25.6% of residents were under the age of 18 and 18.5% of residents were 65 years of age or older. For every 100 females there were 87.6 males, and for every 100 females age 18 and over there were 87.1 males age 18 and over.

0.0% of residents lived in urban areas, while 100.0% lived in rural areas.

There were 721 households in Steele, of which 35.1% had children under the age of 18 living in them. Of all households, 35.4% were married-couple households, 21.6% were households with a male householder and no spouse or partner present, and 36.9% were households with a female householder and no spouse or partner present. About 35.2% of all households were made up of individuals and 17.2% had someone living alone who was 65 years of age or older.

There were 859 housing units, of which 16.1% were vacant. The homeowner vacancy rate was 1.3% and the rental vacancy rate was 14.1%.

Racial composition as of the 2020 census
Race	Number	Percent
White	1,350	72.9%
Black or African American	342	18.5%
American Indian and Alaska Native	7	0.4%
Asian	14	0.8%
Native Hawaiian and Other Pacific Islander	3	0.2%
Some other race	19	1.0%
Two or more races	118	6.4%
Hispanic or Latino (of any race)	48	2.6%

=== 2010 census ===
As of the census of 2010, there were 2,172 people, 838 households, and 551 families living in the city. The population density was 1,180.4 inhabitants per square mile (455.8/km^{2}). There were 919 housing units at an average density of 499.5 per square mile (192.9/km^{2}). The racial makeup of the city was 77.53% White, 18.69% Black or African American, 0.46% Native American, 0.37% Asian, 1.38% from other races, and 1.57% from two or more races. Hispanic or Latino of any race were 2.16% of the population.

There were 838 households, of which 38.8% had children under the age of 18 living with them, 40.5% were married couples living together, 19.0% had a female householder with no husband present, 6.3% had a male householder with no wife present, and 34.2% were non-families. 29.4% of all households were made up of individuals, and 13% had someone living alone who was 65 years of age or older. The average household size was 2.54 and the average family size was 3.12.

The median age in the city was 35.4 years. 29.1% of residents were under the age of 18; 9.2% were between the ages of 18 and 24; 23.8% were from 25 to 44; 23% were from 45 to 64; and 14.9% were 65 years of age or older. The gender makeup of the city was 46.6% male and 53.4% female.

=== 2000 census ===
As of the census of 2000, there were 2,263 people, 887 households, and 582 families living in the city. The population density was 1,205.9 inhabitants per square mile (465.6/km^{2}). There were 971 housing units at an average density of 517.4 per square mile (199.8/km^{2}). The racial makeup of the city was 80.87% White, 17.41% African American, 100% Native American, 0.93% from other races, and 0.75% from two or more races. Hispanic or Latino of any race were 1.81% of the population.

There were 887 households, out of which 31.8% had children under the age of 18 living with them, 43.6% were married couples living together, 17.1% had a female householder with no husband present, and 34.3% were non-families. 30.7% of all households were made up of individuals, and 15.6% had someone living alone who was 65 years of age or older. The average household size was 2.49 and the average family size was 3.11.

In the city, the population was spread out, with 29.7% under the age of 18, 8.8% from 18 to 24, 23.8% from 25 to 44, 21.8% from 45 to 64, and 16.0% who were 65 years of age or older. The median age was 34 years. For every 100 females, there were 84.7 males. For every 100 females age 18 and over, there were 79.0 males.

The median income for a household in the city was $20,958, and the median income for a family was $29,125. Males had a median income of $30,595 versus $19,286 for females. The per capita income for the city was $13,695. About 25.5% of families and 31.3% of the population were below the poverty line, including 39.6% of those under age 18 and 26.0% of those age 65 or over.

== Education ==
South Pemiscot Schools is the local district. It operates these public schools: East Elementary School (Kindergarten), Central Elementary School (grades 1–5), and South Pemiscot High School (grades 6–12).

Steele has a lending library, the Steele Public Library.

Three Rivers College's service area includes Pemiscot County.

== Notable people ==
- Isaac Harmon Severn – Political ally of President Harry S. Truman
