= Arbyrd, Missouri =

- City
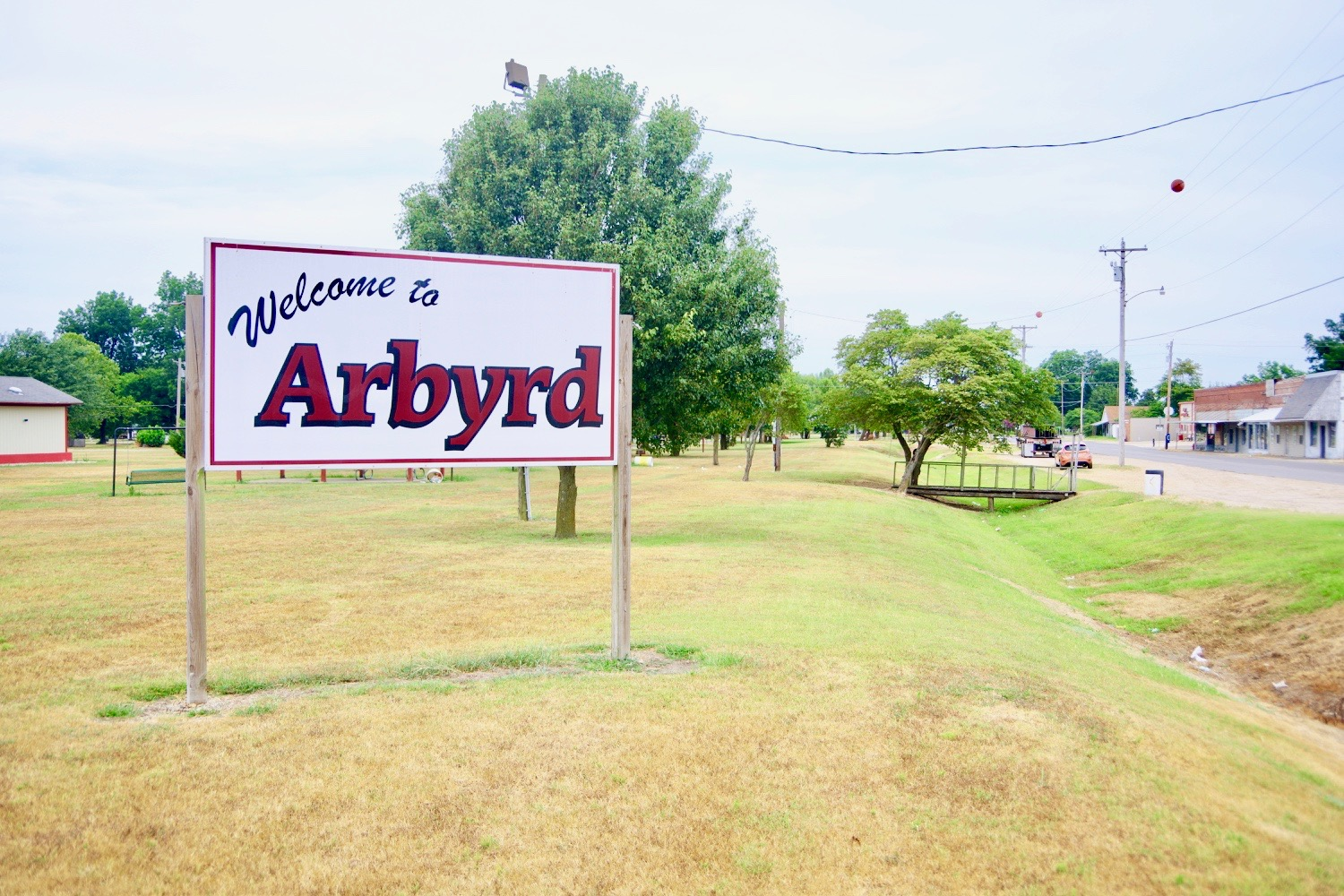
- Welcome sign along Route 108

- Location of Arbyrd, Missouri
- Coordinates: 36°3′2″N 90°14′20″W
- Country: United States
- State: Missouri
- County: Dunklin
- Arbyrd: 1919

Government
  - Mayor: Richard Kelley

Area
  - Total: 1.00 sq mi (2.60 km^{2})
  - Land: 1.00 sq mi (2.60 km^{2})
  - Water: 0 sq mi (0.00 km^{2})
- Elevation: 246 ft (75 m)

Population (2020)
  - Total: 404
  - Density: 402/sq mi (155.3/km^{2})
- Time zone: UTC-6 (Central (CST))
  - Summer (DST): UTC-5 (CDT)
- ZIP code: 63821
- Area code: 573
- FIPS code: 29-01630
- GNIS feature ID: 2393971
- Website: arbyrdmissouri.com

Arbyrd (/ˈɛərbɜːrd/ AIR-burd) is a small town in southeast Dunklin County, Missouri, United States. The population was 404 at the 2020 census. The town was officially incorporated in 1919.

== History ==
A post office called Arbyrd has been in operation since 1911. The town's name is a contraction of A. R. Byrd, a land and cattle speculator from the St. Louis area who lived near San Antonio, Texas, at the time he purchased just over 4000 acres of mostly hardwood timber land just to the north of where the town was originally platted.

== Geography ==
The city is concentrated along Missouri Route 108, with its municipal boundaries stretching southward to the road's junction with Missouri Route 164. U.S. Route 412 passes just to the west. Cardwell lies along Route 164 to the west, and Hornersville lies along Route 164 to the east. Senath lies to the northeast along US 412. The Missouri-Arkansas state line lies three miles to the south along Route 108 (the road becomes Arkansas Highway 77 at the border).

According to the United States Census Bureau, the city has a total area of 1.00 square mile (2.59 km^{2}), all land.

=== List Of Highways ===
- Highway 164
- Highway 108

=== Climate ===
Climate data for Arbyrd, Missouri
Month	Jan	Feb	Mar	Apr	May	Jun	Jul	Aug	Sep	Oct	Nov	Dec	Year
Record high °F (°C)	74 (23)	80 (27)	86 (30)	94 (34)	98 (37)	105 (41)	112 (44)	109 (43)	106 (41)	97 (36)	87 (31)	78 (26)	112 (44)
Mean daily maximum °F (°C)	44 (7)	50 (10)	60 (16)	71 (22)	80 (27)	89 (32)	93 (34)	91 (33)	84 (29)	74 (23)	60 (16)	48 (9)	70 (22)
Mean daily minimum °F (°C)	25 (−4)	29 (−2)	38 (3)	47 (8)	57 (14)	65 (18)	69 (21)	67 (19)	59 (15)	47 (8)	38 (3)	29 (−2)	48 (8)
Record low °F (°C)	−12 (−24)	−4 (−20)	0 (−18)	24 (−4)	34 (1)	43 (6)	50 (10)	46 (8)	34 (1)	24 (−4)	12 (−11)	−6 (−21)	22 (−6)
Average precipitation inches (mm)	3.37 (86)	3.84 (98)	4.85 (123)	4.92 (125)	5.59 (142)	4.03 (102)	3.63 (92)	2.66 (68)	3.29 (84)	3.93 (100)	4.95 (126)	4.55 (116)	49.61 (1,260)

== Demographics ==
Historical population
Census	Pop.	Note	%±
1930	253		—
1940	489		93.3%
1950	679		38.9%
1960	667		−1.8%
1970	575		−13.8%
1980	704		22.4%
1990	597		−15.2%
2000	528		−11.6%
2010	509		−3.6%
2020	404		−20.6%
U.S. Decennial Census

=== 2000 census ===
As of the census of 2000, there were 528 people, 230 households, and 143 families residing in the town. The population density was 528.8 inhabitants per square mile (204.2/km^{2}). There were 257 housing units at an average density of 257.4 per square mile (99.4/km^{2}). The racial makeup of the town was 98.48% White, 0.19% African American, 0.19% Native American, and 1.14% from two or more races. Hispanic or Latino of any race were 1.14% of the population.

There were 230 households, out of which 23.5% had children under the age of 18 living with them, 48.7% were married couples living together, 8.3% had a female householder with no husband present, and 37.4% were non-families. 34.8% of all households were made up of individuals, and 17.0% had someone living alone who was 65 years of age or older. The average household size was 2.30 and the average family size was 2.91.

In the town the population was spread out, with 24.1% under the age of 18, 7.4% from 18 to 24, 23.9% from 25 to 44, 27.1% from 45 to 64, and 17.6% who were 65 years of age or older. The median age was 42 years. For every 100 females, there were 97.0 males. For every 100 females age 18 and over, there were 96.6 males.

The median income for a household in the town was $25,438, and the median income for a family was $28,929. Males had a median income of $24,432 versus $16,563 for females. The per capita income for the town was $12,504. About 14.3% of families and 23.8% of the population were below the poverty line, including 28.8% of those under age 18 and 28.7% of those age 65 or over.

=== 2010 census ===
As of the census of 2010, there were 509 people, 198 households, and 124 families residing in the city. The population density was 509.0 inhabitants per square mile (196.5/km^{2}). There were 228 housing units at an average density of 228.0 per square mile (88.0/km^{2}). The racial makeup of the city was 94.30% White, 0.20% Native American, 4.72% from other races, and 0.79% from two or more races. Hispanic or Latino of any race were 8.25% of the population.

There were 198 households, of which 35.4% had children under the age of 18 living with them, 43.4% were married couples living together, 9.6% had a female householder with no husband present, 9.6% had a male householder with no wife present, and 37.4% were non-families. 31.8% of all households were made up of individuals, and 17.2% had someone living alone who was 65 years of age or older. The average household size was 2.57 and the average family size was 3.24.

The median age in the city was 39.4 years. 27.7% of residents were under the age of 18; 7.3% were between the ages of 18 and 24; 22.8% were from 25 to 44; 23.6% were from 45 to 64; and 18.7% were 65 years of age or older. The gender makeup of the city was 49.3% male and 50.7% female.

== Arts and culture ==
The Missouri Bootheel was the home of two members of The Kentucky Headhunters, Doug and Ricky Phelps. They grew up in Cardwell and Arbyrd and obtained their education from the Southland C-9 school district. Doug and Ricky were both members of the Headhunters who then left to form their own band called - Brother Phelps.

== Education ==
It is in the Southland C-9 School District.

The nearest Dunklin County Library branch is, as of 2023, is in Cardwell. The Dunklin County Library formerly operated an Arbyrd Library branch. It closed circa 2011. In 2015 a community library was established by the Arbyrd Development Corporation. As of 2023 there was advocacy to re-establish the county library branch, as there was a desire to have more than the small community library.
