= Missouri Bootheel =

Geographic region of Missouri, US

- Location of the bootheel region centered on 36°15′N 89°51′W

Area
  - Land: 1,708.45 sq mi (4,424.9 km^{2})

Population (2019)
  - Total: 62,012
  - Density: 36.3/sq mi (14.0/km^{2})

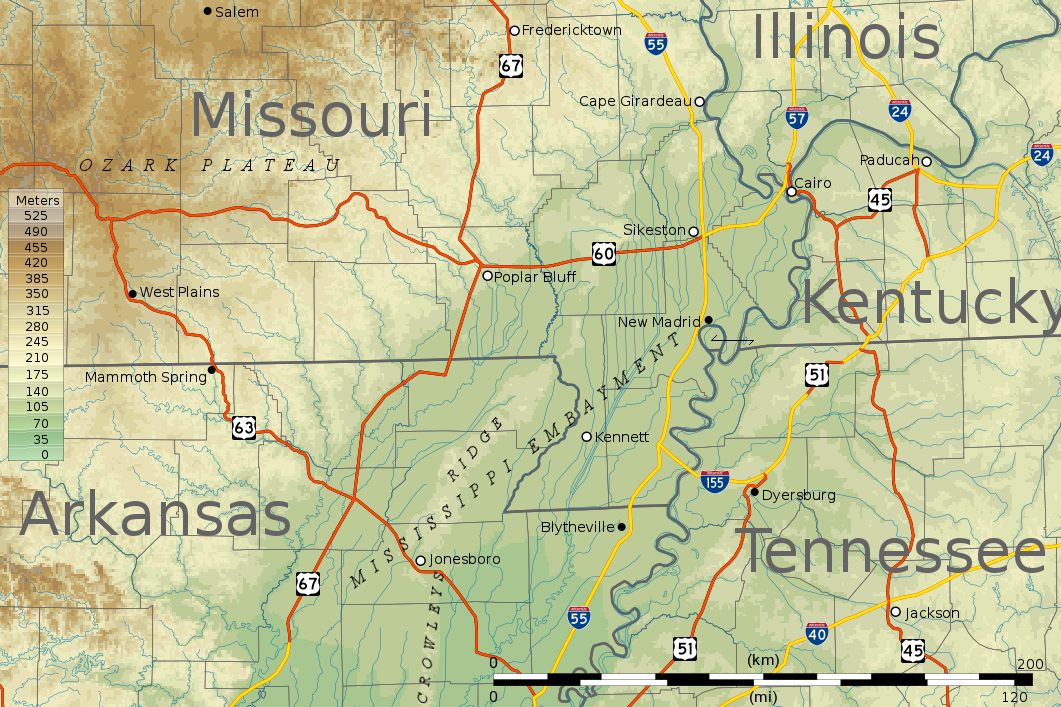
Topographic map of the bootheel and surrounding areas of Missouri and neighboring states.

The Missouri Bootheel is the protrusion located in the southeasternmost part of the U.S. state of Missouri, extending south of 36°30′ north latitude, so called because its shape in relation to the rest of the state resembles the heel of a boot. Strictly speaking, it is composed of some or all of the counties of Dunklin, New Madrid, and Pemiscot. However, the term is locally used to refer to the entire southeastern lowlands of Missouri located within the Mississippi Embayment, which includes parts of Butler, Mississippi, Ripley, Scott, Stoddard and extreme southern portions of Cape Girardeau and Bollinger counties. The largest city in the region is Kennett.

Until the 1920s, the district was a wheat-growing area of family farms. Following the invasion of the boll weevil, which ruined the cotton crop in Arkansas, planters moved in. They bought up the land for conversion to cotton commodity crops, bringing along thousands of sharecroppers. After mechanization of agriculture and other changes in the 1930s, many black families left the area to go north in the Great Migration. These counties have predominantly white populations in the 21st century, although some have a significant number of black residents.

== History ==
When Missouri was admitted to the Union as part of the Missouri Compromise, its original border was proposed as an extension of the 36°30′ parallel north that formed the border between Kentucky and Tennessee. That would have excluded the Bootheel. John Hardeman Walker, a pioneer planter in what is now Pemiscot County, argued that the area had more in common with the Mississippi River towns of Cape Girardeau, Ste. Genevieve and St. Louis in Missouri than with its proposed incorporation in the Arkansas Territory. The border was dropped about 50 miles to the 36th parallel north. It follows that parallel west about 30 miles until intersecting the St. Francis River, then follows that river north to about the 36°30′ parallel just west of Campbell, Missouri.

According to an apocryphal story in various versions, the Bootheel was added to the state because of the request of John Hardeman Walker to remain in the state "as he had heard it was so sickly in Arkansas", "...full of bears and panthers and copperhead snakes, so it ain't safe for civilized people to stay there over night even." Another legend has the adaptation made by a lovestruck surveyor to spare the feelings of a widow living 50 miles south of the Missouri border, but unaware of it. At one time, the area was known locally as "Lapland, because it's the place where Missouri laps over into Arkansas".

During the American Civil War, a number of battles took place in this area, most notably the Battle of Island No. 10.

Until the early 20th century, the district was largely covered by wetlands and swamps, but otherwise was a wheat-growing area of family farms. Lumbering was important in the 1890s until the most valuable trees were taken.

In 1905, the Little River Drainage District built an elaborate network of ditches, canals, and levees to drain the swamps, as people believed, not understanding about the important function of wetlands in modifying river flooding, that the highest use was for agriculture.

From 1880 to 1930, the population in the area more than tripled as many workers were brought in. Cotton became the chief commodity crop. Meanwhile, the boll weevil ruined the cotton crop in Arkansas, and planters moved into the Bootheel, bought up the new lands or leased them from insurance companies that had invested in the area, and recruited thousands of black sharecroppers as workers.

During the 1910s, the Bootheel experienced a surge in racial violence as white tenant farmers attacked black workers who were imported by landowners from the South. This competition between white laborers and black laborers resulted in a period of extreme racial violence which took the form of lynchings in New Madrid, Charleston, and Caruthersville.

In contrast to the other cotton-growing areas of the South, where blacks had been disfranchised around the turn of the century, they were allowed to vote in Missouri and played a political role in this area. In the main, political power was held by white power brokers, especially Democrat J. V. Conran from the 1930s to 1960s. He worked closely with blacks in the region. An ally of Senator and President Harry S. Truman, Conran packed the ballot boxes but did bring efficiency and government services, and helped improve economic and social conditions.

During the Great Depression, the Farm Security Administration said that the Bootheel was a "paradox of rich land and poor people." In 1935, three-fourths of all farms were operated by tenants, most of them black. Radicals in the Southern Tenant Farmers Union organized protests by hundreds of sharecroppers in early 1939, alleging that landlords had evicted masses of tenants because they did not want to share federal AAA checks with them. The Farm Security Administration, a New Deal agency, responded by providing low-cost rental housing for 500 cropper families. It awarded $500,000 (equivalent to $9 million in 2024) in grants to 11,000 families in 1939. The protest fizzled out as Communist and Socialist elements battled for control.

== Geography and geology ==
Available samples from the Bootheel and most of the southeastern Missouri counties demonstrate late Tertiary (more than 1.8 mya) to Quaternary (1.8 mya to present) geology, much younger than neighboring highlands. The lowest point in the state is in southwestern Dunklin County along the St. Francis River near Arbyrd, at 230 feet above sea level. The bootheel area is notable for being the epicenter of the 1811–12 New Madrid earthquakes, some of the largest earthquakes ever felt in the United States.

Barring surveying errors along the rest of the Arkansas border, the Missouri Bootheel is the only part of Missouri in the Sun Belt according to the Kinder Institute. Kinder defines the Sun Belt as areas south of 36°30'N latitude, which was drawn to be the northern border of neighboring Tennessee, the southern border of neighboring Oklahoma's panhandle and the southern border of non-Bootheel areas of Missouri.

== Swamp reclamation and flooding ==
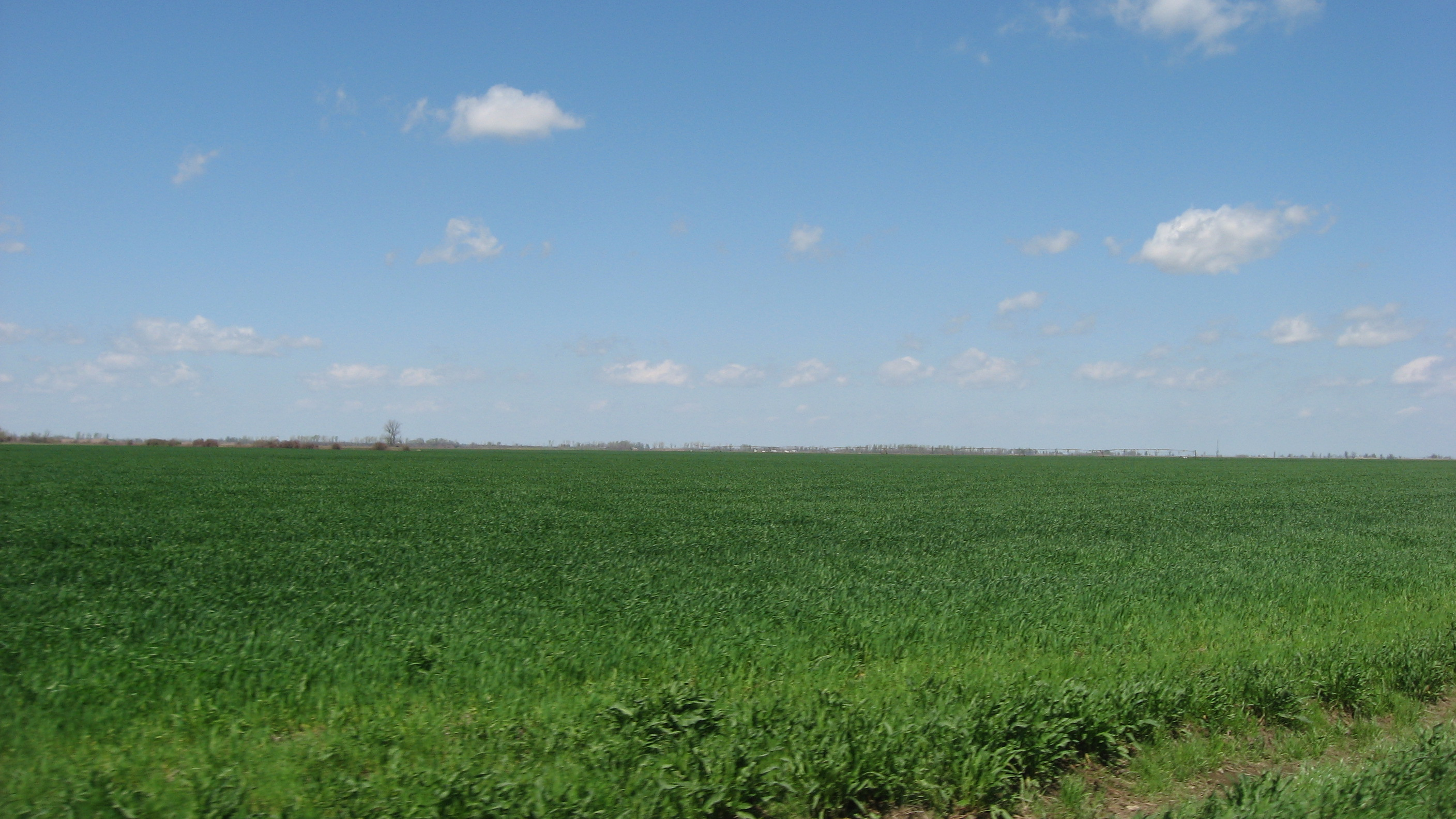
A typical Bootheel scene: the Mississippi floodplain in southern Pemiscot County

As glaciers receded towards the end of the Ice Age and turned ice into liquid, the Mississippi River grew longer and wider. Over time, the silt deposits of the Mississippi created some of the most fertile soil in the world, ideal for agriculture. The areas around the Mississippi are composed of thick regolith that is around 100 metres (330 ft) thick. The Bootheel lies in the flood plain between the Mississippi and St. Francis rivers, so the land is very flat. Since clearing and drainage of wetlands in the early 20th century, it has been predominantly developed for agricultural purposes. Prior to the 20th century, it was mostly swampy forestland.

Between 1893 and 1989, developers cut about 85% of the native forests in the region; most clearing was done in the early decades of the 20th century. The entire landscape was transformed into farmland by extensive logging, draining of the watershed, channelization, and the construction of flood control structures. High levees along both river courses, an extensive system of drainage ditches and diversion channels, and controlled lakes, pumping stations and cutoffs protect the area from flooding. The soils are predominantly a rich and deep glacial loess, alluvial silt, and a sandy loam, well-suited for agricultural use.

But the levees have changed the nature of the rivers, and cumulatively have aggravated flooding problems. They also prevent regular silt deposits, as they have increased the speed of the rivers. The reduction in wetlands has reduced important habitats for many species of migratory birds and a variety of fish and animals.

Flooding is a major concern along the Mississippi River. With such a large river basin and the vast discharge of water, the river makes the towns along its banks highly susceptible to frequent flooding. The National Weather Service reported that from 1980 to 2002, nine floods in the United States had total losses exceeding one billion dollars. In terms of monetary loss and effects on society, the Great Flood of 1993 was the worst.

== New Madrid fault zone ==
Earthquakes have long been frequent in the area. The New Madrid Fault Zone is named for the city of New Madrid in the Bootheel. This fault zone is entirely hidden beneath the deep alluvial deposits of the Mississippi embayment. Unlike the San Andreas Fault in California, it is not visible anywhere. This fault zone was responsible for an extremely powerful series of earthquakes that rocked the area in 1811 and 1812, known collectively as the New Madrid earthquake. It was reported to have been so powerful as to ring church bells along the East Coast. Subsidence formed Reelfoot Lake on the other side of the Mississippi River in West Tennessee. An eyewitness of the earthquakes of 1811 and 1812 noted:

Great fissures opened the earth, geysers show mud and rocks hundreds of feet in the air, new hills and ridges heaved up out of the ground, and the river itself ran red with brimstone and sulfur. Whole islands in the river disappeared, the forests went under, the tall oaks snapped like twigs, and violent winds tossed bundles of fallen timbers. Deafening thunder rang to the heavens. Animals went crazy; thousands of birds hovered and screamed.

The states of Missouri, Arkansas, Mississippi, Alabama, Tennessee, Kentucky, Illinois, and Indiana felt the brunt of this quake, ruining lives and leaving residents in fear of aftershocks and possible larger quakes. The New Madrid Seismic Zone is still active and frequently produces small earthquakes. Scientists have estimated that a strong earthquake is inevitable and is overdue. Residents of the area are aware of the risk, but critics say they are not well prepared for a disaster. William Atkinson, author of The Next New Madrid Earthquake, writes:

The area is well overdue for a moderately powerful tremor- which will cause major damage and undoubtedly some casualties...With each passing year, the inevitable earthquake is becoming more powerful, while the state of readiness in the Mississippi Valley remains woefully inadequate.

== Culture and economy ==
The Bootheel is on the edge of the Mississippi Delta culture that produced the Delta blues. Its relatively large black population makes it distinct from the rest of rural Missouri. The area has a unique rural black culture reflected in its music, churches and other traditions. The black population ranges from about 26% in Pemiscot County, to 15% in New Madrid County, and about 9% in Dunklin County.

The Bootheel once had a reputation for lawlessness. Remote settlements along the river banks, miles from paved roads, provided an ideal environment (and market) for moonshining and bootlegging.

Culturally, the Bootheel is considered more Southern than Midwestern. It was settled largely by people from the South, both black and white. It is considered part of the Mid-South, a region centered on the Memphis metropolitan area; it is also included in the area of the Upper South. Definitions of the Mid-South vary but in general include west Tennessee and Kentucky, north Mississippi, northeast Arkansas, and the Missouri Bootheel. The locations of the region's television stations had reflected this until the early 21st century prior to smaller, but closer cities obtaining local stations and before the digital transition in 2009:

- CBS and Fox affiliates (KFVS-TV and KBSI, respectively) are located in Cape Girardeau (the prior affiliate was WREG-TV in Memphis)
- ABC affiliates include WSIL-TV in Harrisburg, Illinois, and KAIT in Jonesboro, Arkansas (the prior affiliate was WATN in Memphis)
- NBC affiliate WPSD-TV is in Paducah, Kentucky; digital subchannel KAIT-DT2 from Jonesboro is a secondary affiliate (the prior affiliate was WMC-TV in Memphis)

Economically, the agricultural area is one of the more impoverished parts of Missouri. It does not enjoy the benefits of tourism as do areas of the nearby Ozark Mountains. There is some manufacturing, but the area is primarily agricultural. Because of its alluvial past, the area's rich soil is ideal for growing soybeans, rice and cotton. Some truck crops are grown, most notably various types of melons, especially watermelons. A limited amount of livestock is raised. In contrast to much of the rest of Missouri, there are few fences.

No large cities are located in the Bootheel. Sizable towns include Kennett, the birthplace of singers Sheryl Crow, David Nail, and Trent Tomlinson; and Sikeston, the birthplace of professional athletes James Wilder Sr., Brandon Barnes, and Blake DeWitt. Sikeston's city limits fall within both Scott County and New Madrid County. Cape Girardeau and Poplar Bluff are often considered to be part of the Bootheel due to the influence the two cities have had on the development of the region, but neither is located within its geographic boundaries.

Hornersville, a small town in southern Dunklin County, was home to William H. "Major" Ray, a one-time 19th-century circus "midget". He later became known as the representative of the Buster Brown shoe brand. He and his wife, Jennie, are buried in a cemetery in Hornersville. Caruthersville is the county seat of Pemiscot County.

The small towns of Senath and Arbyrd are also located in Dunklin County. They are home to a locally celebrated ghost light, sometimes called the "Senath Light" or "Arbyrd light". It occurs between these two towns and closer to Hollywood near the Lulu Church and Cemetery.

The Missouri Bootheel is the home of two members of the musical group the Kentucky Headhunters, Doug and Ricky Phelps. They received their education at Southland C-9, the consolidated schools of Arbyrd and Cardwell, Missouri. They performed at the Cotton Pickin Festival in the small town of Arbyrd; a place where they spent much time while growing up. They both performed as Brother Phelps, and then Doug came back and performed with The Kentucky Headhunters. This festival is a major attraction and draws a huge crowd for a town of only about 550 people. Other prominent acts at Arbyrd include T. Graham Brown and The Bellamy Brothers.

Also in the northern part of Dunklin County lies the town of Malden, the home of country/rockabilly singer Narvel Felts. Felts' music has played worldwide, as he continues to tour.

== Politics ==
Results of presidential elections in the Missouri Bootheel:

Year	Democratic		Republican		Third Party	
Year	#	%	#	%	#	%
2024	4,777	21.58%	17,216	77.79%	139	0.63%
2020	5,508	23.53%	17,702	75.64%	194	0.83%
2016	6,240	26.04%	17,260	72.03%	462	1.93%
2012	9,121	37.63%	14,732	60.79%	383	1.58%
2008	10,939	40.66%	15,591	57.95%	373	1.39%
2004	11,998	45.46%	14,272	54.08%	120	0.45%
2000	11,930	50.02%	11,592	48.60%	329	1.38%
1996	13,250	56.58%	8,003	34.17%	2,167	9.25%
1992	15,084	56.84%	8,616	32.47%	2,836	10.69%
1988	12,381	51.82%	11,479	48.05%	32	0.13%
1984	12,036	45.97%	14,148	54.03%	0	0%
1980	14,431	52.35%	12,813	46.48%	325	1.18%
1976	17,107	66.27%	8,653	33.52%	55	0.21%
1972	8,293	35.06%	15,358	64.94%	0	0%
1968	11,939	40.27%	8,874	29.93%	8,837	29.80%
1964	20,965	70.66%	8,706	29.34%	0	0%
1960	21,253	58.02%	15,377	41.98%	0	0%
1956	25,181	66.89%	12,464	33.11%	0	0%
1952	26,932	66.84%	13,327	33.07%	37	0.09%
1948	30,173	81.54%	6,797	18.37%	35	0.09%
1944	23,437	64.71%	12,715	35.11%	65	0.18%
1940	30,114	62.65%	17,845	37.13%	107	0.22%
1936	26,195	66.72%	12,970	33.03%	97	0.25%
1932	24,887	70.66%	10,160	28.85%	173	0.49%
1928	14,291	49.38%	14,608	50.48%	42	0.15%
1924	14,140	52.49%	12,265	45.53%	532	1.97%
1920	12,737	49.15%	12,643	48.79%	534	2.06%
1916	8,885	57.20%	6,039	38.88%	609	3.92%
1912	6,285	48.60%	3,567	27.58%	3,079	23.81%
1908	6,283	56.11%	4,464	39.87%	450	4.02%
1904	4,861	58.31%	3,306	39.65%	170	2.04%
1900	5,460	67.04%	2,599	31.91%	85	1.04%
1896	5,874	76.47%	1,796	23.38%	11	0.14%
1892	4,082	74.38%	1,153	21.01%	253	4.61%
1888	3,551	73.66%	1,269	26.32%	1	0.02%
1884	3,296	77.39%	963	22.61%	0	0%
1880	3,165	84.33%	588	15.67%	0	0%
1876	2,935	88.40%	384	11.57%	1	0.03%
1872	2,079	85.07%	365	14.93%	0	0%
1868	489	97.41%	13	2.59%	0	0%
1864	9	8.33%	99	91.67%	0	0%
1860	385	30.08%	0	0%	895	69.92%
1856	500	49.36%	0	0%	513	50.64%
1852	66	30.56%	150	69.44%	0	0%
1848	210	36.52%	365	63.48%	0	0%
1844	208	41.11%	298	58.89%	0	0%
1840	194	34.83%	363	65.17%	0	0%
1836	No returns		No returns		No returns	
1832	No returns		No returns		No returns	
1828	58	63.74%	33	36.26%	0	0%

== See also ==
- New Mexico Bootheel
