= Cottonwood Point, Missouri =

Unincorporated community in Missouri, U.S.

Coordinates: 36°03′50″N 89°41′57″W

Cottonwood Point is an unincorporated community in Pemiscot County, in the U.S. state of Missouri. The community is on the west bank of the Mississippi River with Heloise, Tennessee lying one mile across the river to the southeast.

== History ==
A post office called Cottonwood Point was established in 1853, and remained in operation until 1912. The community was named for a grove of cottonwood trees near the original town site. It is also the home of the Historic Taylor Cemetery and the Taylor Cemetery Restoration Project started in 2017.
