= Hornersville, Missouri =

Hornersville
- City

- Location within Missouri
- Coordinates: 36°2′25″N 90°6′57″W
- Country: United States
- State: Missouri
- Region: Dunklin County

Area
  - Total: 0.78 sq mi (2.03 km^{2})
  - Land: 0.78 sq mi (2.02 km^{2})
  - Water: 0.0039 sq mi (0.01 km^{2})
- Elevation: 246 ft (75 m)

Population (2020)
  - Total: 537
  - Density: 688.0/sq mi (265.65/km^{2})
- Time zone: CST
- ZIP code: 63855
- Area code: 573
- FIPS code: 29-33076
- GNIS feature ID: 2394421

Hornersville is a city in Dunklin County, Missouri, United States, founded in 1840. It is the southernmost municipality in the state of Missouri. The population was 537 at the 2020 census.

According to the United States Geological Survey, Hornersville is the southernmost town in Missouri.

== History ==
Hornersville was platted in 1842. The city was named for its founder, Dr. William H. Horner, who had settled there in 1832. A post office called Hornersville has been in operation since 1875. Hornersville got train service in 1897 from Paragould, Arkansas when the Paragould Southeastern Railway was completed into town; and, was later linked to Blytheville, Arkansas when that rail line was extended.

In 1942, an auxiliary field for the Blytheville Army Airfield was constructed west of town. The field was used by cadets of the advanced flight school for their training exercises.

== Geography ==
Hornersville is located at 36°2′25″N 90°6′57″W (36.0403228, -90.1158674). It is the southernmost municipality in the Midwestern United States.

According to the United States Census Bureau, the city has a total area of 0.78 square miles (2.02 km^{2}), all land.

== Demographics ==
Historical population
Census	Pop.	Note	%±
1900	240		—
1910	390		62.5%
1920	647		65.9%
1930	877		35.5%
1940	964		9.9%
1950	875		−9.2%
1960	752		−14.1%
1970	693		−7.8%
1980	704		1.6%
1990	629		−10.7%
2000	686		9.1%
2010	663		−3.4%
2020	537		−19.0%
U.S. Decennial Census

=== 2010 census ===
As of the census of 2010, there were 663 people, 275 households, and 178 families living in the city. The population density was 850.0 inhabitants per square mile (328.2/km^{2}). There were 302 housing units at an average density of 387.2 per square mile (149.5/km^{2}). The racial makeup of the city was 97.0% White, 1.2% Native American, 0.3% from other races, and 1.5% from two or more races. Hispanic or Latino of any race were 5.4% of the population.

There were 275 households, of which 31.3% had children under the age of 18 living with them, 44.7% were married couples living together, 13.1% had a female householder with no husband present, 6.9% had a male householder with no wife present, and 35.3% were non-families. 33.1% of all households were made up of individuals, and 16.4% had someone living alone who was 65 years of age or older. The average household size was 2.41 and the average family size was 3.01.

The median age in the city was 36.4 years. 24% of residents were under the age of 18; 10.7% were between the ages of 18 and 24; 25% were from 25 to 44; 27% were from 45 to 64; and 13.1% were 65 years of age or older. The gender makeup of the city was 50.1% male and 49.9% female.

=== 2000 census ===
As of the census of 2000, there were 686 people, 296 households, and 182 families living in the city. The population density was 865.8 inhabitants per square mile (334.3/km^{2}). There were 324 housing units at an average density of 408.9 per square mile (157.9/km^{2}). The racial makeup of the city was 97.23% White, 0.58% African American, 0.58% Asian, 1.31% from other races, and 0.29% from two or more races. Hispanic or Latino of any race were 4.23% of the population.

There were 296 households, out of which 28.7% had children under the age of 18 living with them, 46.3% were married couples living together, 11.8% had a female householder with no husband present, and 38.2% were non-families. 33.8% of all households were made up of individuals, and 17.6% had someone living alone who was 65 years of age or older. The average household size was 2.32 and the average family size was 3.00.

In the city the population was spread out, with 26.2% under the age of 18, 7.3% from 18 to 24, 25.2% from 25 to 44, 21.6% from 45 to 64, and 19.7% who were 65 years of age or older. The median age was 40 years. For every 100 females, there were 99.4 males. For every 100 females age 18 and over, there were 87.4 males.

The median income for a household in the city was $22,000. Males had a median income of $28,500 versus $16,875 for females. The per capita income for the city was $11,589. About 22.5% of families and 28.9% of the population were below the poverty line, including 38.1% of those under age 18 and 28.6% of those age 65 or over.

== Education ==
Senath-Hornersville C-8 School District, which covers the municipality, operates Senath-Hornersville Middle School in the city.

Hornersville has a public library, a branch of the Dunklin County Library.
