= Lifeline (safety) =

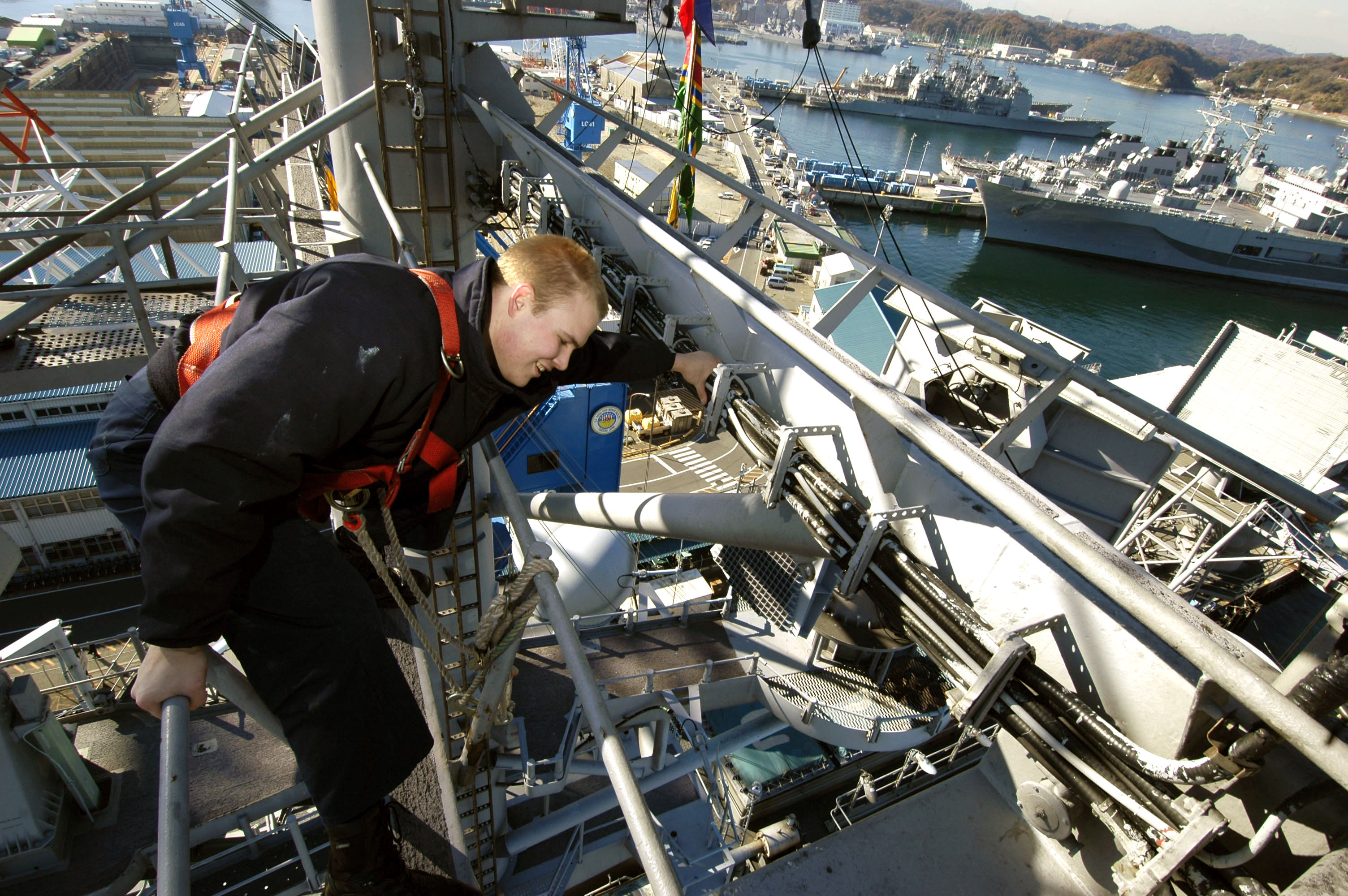
Worker secured by a lifeline.

A lifeline is a fall protection safety device in the form of an open fence composed of wire and stanchions secured around the perimeter of an area to prevent accidental falls. It is commonly found on sailboats and construction sites, as well as other situations where dangerous falls can occur, such as at scenic overlooks and in caves.

For workers who require horizontal mobility along an edge or elevated surface, a horizontal cable lifeline system offers a practical solution by providing continuous fall protection across long distances. These systems consist of a permanently installed, multi-span anchored cable, allowing workers to secure themselves while moving along the cable. Horizontal lifeline systems require careful engineering due to the specific nature of the structures they are designed for, ensuring safety in high-risk areas.

Lifeline wire has traditionally been available in 1/8" (3.175 mm) and 3/16" (4.763 mm) wire diameters, with a soft but durable vinyl coating increasing the effective diameters to 7/32" (5.556 mm) and 5/16" (8.467 mm) respectively. It should be inspected on an annual basis for signs of corrosion or breakage of wire strands. Regular maintenance and inspection are crucial for lifeline systems. In corrosive environments, it is recommended that lifeline systems be inspected more frequently than annually. Signs of wear, damage, or corrosion can compromise the system's effectiveness, leading to serious safety hazards. Certified professionals should conduct inspections to ensure that anchor points, wire ropes, and other components meet OSHA and ANSI standards.

In simplest form, a land-based lifeline consists of a horizontal wire rope cable attached to two or more anchor points on a roof-top, crane runway, bridge or outdoor construction site, or any other elevated work area that poses a fall risk. OSHA defines an anchorage in a fall protection system "a secure point of attachment for lifelines, lanyards, or deceleration devices".

Construction site lifeline systems include dedicated attachment brackets, safety lanyards and harnesses. Construction lifeline systems may be subdivided into those used to arrest workers in the event of a fall (active systems), or restrain workers from reaching a fall hazard (restraint systems).

== See also ==
- Fall protection
- Safety device
