= Fall protection =

Controls for workplace fall hazards

A video on the value of fall protection measures

Fall protection refers to the use of controls designed to prevent personnel from falling or, if a fall occurs, to stop it without causing severe injury. Falls are one of the most leading causes for work-related injuries and deaths. While fall protection is typically associated when working at height, it is also relevant when working near edges, such as near a pit or hole, or steep surfaces. Many of these incidents are preventable when proper precautions are taken, making fall protection training not only critical, but also required.

== Falls in the workplace ==
The American Society of Safety Professionals stated that falls account for 80.1% of the slips, trips, and fall category. Globally, the World Health Organization identified falls as the second leading cause of unintentional injury deaths worldwide, with an estimated 684,000 individuals dying annually.

In 2021, there were 5,190 fatal workplace injuries in the United States, with 680 (approximately 13%) resulting from falls from elevations. The CDC adds that falls in the work place usually happen by means of unprotected edges, unsafely positioned ladders, misused fall protection, water, grease, and other contaminants on the floor, clutter and tripping hazards in walkways, and irregularities in the floor and wall openings. Nevertheless, falls can be preventable through trainings, correct use of personal protective equipment (PPE) and the implementation of hierarchy of controls. In the United States, statutes, standards, and regulations pertaining to fall protection are administered by Occupational Safety and Health Administration (OSHA). According to OSHA, employers are required to take measures for fall protection, including providing working conditions that are free of hazards, keeping floors in work areas in a clean and dry condition, selecting and providing required personal protective equipment at no cost, and training workers about job hazards in a language they can understand.

== Types of fall protection ==
There are four generally accepted categories of fall protection: fall elimination, fall prevention, fall arrest and administrative controls.

=== Fall elimination and substitution ===
Fall elimination is often the preferred way of providing fall protection. This entails finding ways of completing tasks without working at heights. Although this solution is highly recommended, job performance may have an impact on whether this route is even possible or would be affected enough for the employees. One example of elimination is moving equipment to a lower location. This will make it easier for any employee that needs to use the equipment for repairs or maintenance without having possession of a lift or ladder. The main challenge with using elimination for fall protections is figuring out what change is need for the practice, procedures, or location of the equipment that is exposed to fall hazards.

Another way to eliminate fall hazards is simply by substituting them with a more effective way to work without there being an opportunity for possible injury. This may include coming up with a way for workers to stay on the ground rather than having them work at heights.

=== Fall prevention. ===
Fall prevention is used when working from elevated areas are unavoidable. The most efficient way to protect employees from fall injuries or casualties is to prevent them from being able to fall from the start. Both passive and safety system are put in place to aid fall prevention. In addition to elevated work areas, fall prevention measures should also be applied around hazardous machinery and open holes. OSHA also required that all workplace apply the following:

- Decrease the amount of hazards in the workplace
- Housekeeping (keep the work areas clear, dry, and clean)
- All employees should be well trained on identifying fall hazards and how to properly use the fall protection equipment that is provided for them.

Passive Fall Prevention

This is a system that is stationary, non-dynamic, or adapt when it is being used.

Fall guarding is the use of guard rails or other barricades to prevent a person from falling. These barricades are placed near an edge where a fall-hazard can occur, or to surround a weak surface (such as a skylight on a roof) which may break when stepped on. Other examples include covers for openings and holes, as well as netting systems.

Active Fall Prevention

This system involves the worker partication to function properly.

Safety harnesses are designed to keep the users body attached to their lanyard. Fall restraint is a class of personal protective equipment to prevent persons who are in a fall hazard area from falling. These systems physically prevent a worker from approaching edges, reducing the risk of falling.

Risk Management

There are many workplaces that are hazardous based on what might be required for the certain job. For example, There is fall injuries for slipping on surfaces with poor traction. To reduce the risk of injury first, take your time and don't rush, look ahead of you and not just down, change your stride in a way you can comfortably maneuver on the surface, turn corners slowly and use wide turns, walk with your feet outwards for better balance.

Maintaining a clean environment is one of the most important ways to prevent falls in the work place. Some immediate actions that can be taken to effectively prevent falls include immediately cleaning up spilled liquid, marking wet floors and hazards zones, regularly sweeping and vacuuming debris, keeing walkways clear of clutter, securing loose rugs and mats with tape or tacks, covering electrical cables in walking pathways, keeping drawers and cabinet doors closed, and replacing burned-out light bulbs as soon as possible.

=== Fall arrest ===
Fall arrest is an active form of fall protection design to stop a worker from falling and after a fall as occurred and prevent impact on the ground. These fall arrest systems consist of harness, single or multiple anchor points, and a self- retracting lifeline or safety lanyard.

The most common types of fall arrest systems is the Personal Fall Arrest System (PFAS) often referred to as a "lifeline". A PFAS is a series of constituents designed to arrest a worker's fall, preventing contact with lowest level, and minimizing risk of serious injury.

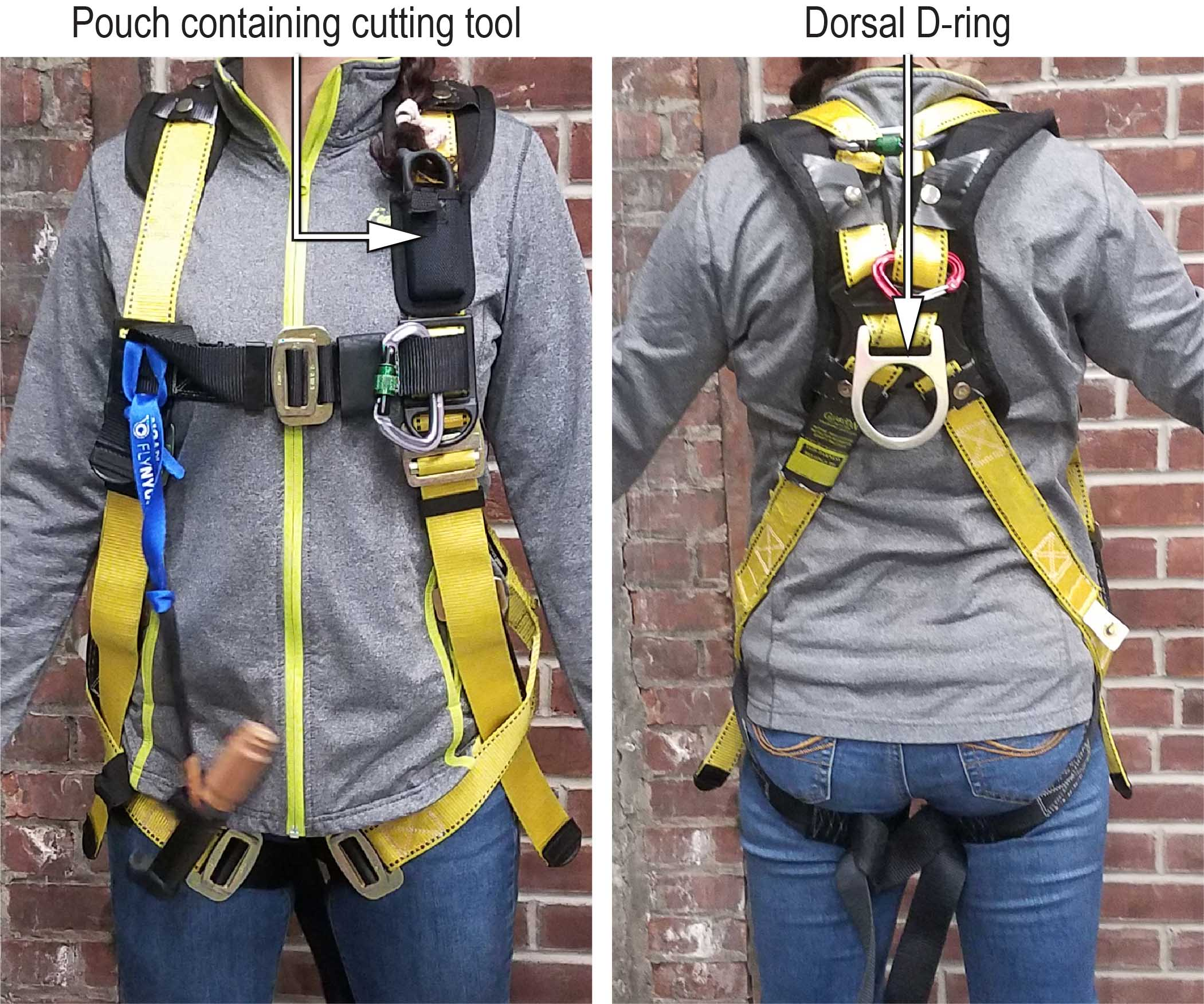
Full Body Safety Harnesses

=== Administrative controls ===
Administrative controls are used in conjunction with other safety measures; however they do not physically prevent a worker from going over an edge. Instead they focus on policies, procedures, and practices that reduce exposure to hazards.

Administrative controls include the following:

Training: Education and training are vital mechanisms to ensure workers learn about workplace hazards and how to limit personal exposure.

Codes of practice: A code of practice creates safe work practices for specific hazards.

Working alone protocol: Regulations such as Part 28 of the Occupational Health and Safety Code requires procedures that helps workers identify the danger of working alone and implenting appropriate controls.

Safe work practices: This is a written method for showing workers how to safely handle specific hazardous materials.

Emergency preparedness: Planning and response strategies can prevent/reduce injuries or damage to property.

Documentation and signage: All locations containing hazardous materials need warning signs were hazardous materials are present.

Maintenance and housekeeping: Proper equipment maintenance and good housekeeping pracitices critical to controlling exposure to workplace hazards.

Preventive health measures: Preventive health measures are necessary to prevent serious illnesses or injuries.

== See also ==
- Construction site safety
- Roofer
