= Energy absorber =

Energy absorber may refer to:

- A panel to absorb the radiant energy of sunlight to heat a fluid, such as solar hot water
- A bolometer, a device to convert electromagnetic radiation and the momentum of energetic particles to thermal energy which in turn is easily measured
- A kinetic-energy absorbing medium, sometimes called a crash pit or runaway truck ramp
- A shock absorber, a device to dampen spring rebound by expending work by forcing a fluid through ports, and so converting the mechanical energy to heat
- In the context of Fall arrest, an energy absorber is a device that limits the energy of a falling body
- A material or device to disperse and dissipate impact energy, such as
  - a protective helmet for sports, motorcycling or bicycling
  - armor such as a ballistic vest for protection in warfare
  - Materials to protect boxed contents during shipping, such as
    - Foam peanuts
    - Bubble wrap
- A portion of vehicle such as an automobile designed to protect the occupants, usually by creating "crumple zones" at each end of the vehicle while preserving a stiff central cage in which the occupants are secured by seat belts and protected by inflatable air bags
- A piece of rock climbing equipment
