= Boat =

Small watercraft

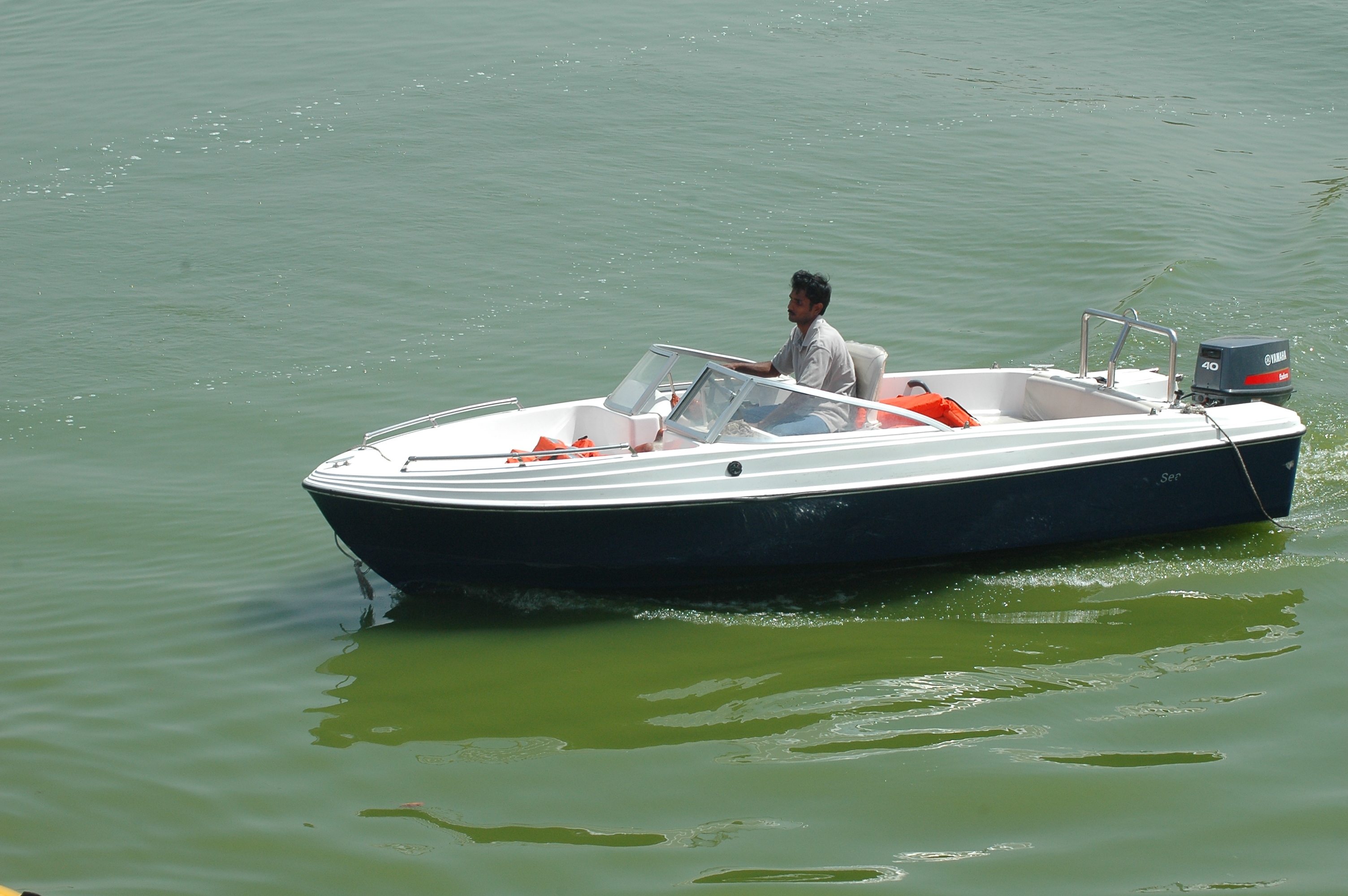
A recreational motorboat with an outboard motor

A boat is a watercraft of a large range of types and sizes, but generally smaller than a ship, which is distinguished by its larger size or capacity, its shape, or its ability to carry boats.

Small boats are typically used on inland waterways such as rivers and lakes, or in protected coastal areas. However, some boats (such as whaleboats) were intended for offshore use. In modern naval terms, a boat is a vessel small enough to be carried aboard a ship.

Submarines are referred to as boats rather than ships regardless of their size.

Boats vary in proportions and construction methods according to their intended purpose, available materials, or local traditions. Canoes have been used since prehistoric times and remain in use throughout the world for transportation, fishing, and sport. Fishing boats vary widely in style, partly to match local conditions. Pleasure craft used in recreational boating include ski boats, pontoon boats, and sailboats. Houseboats may be used for vacationing or long-term residence. Lighters are used to move cargo to and from large ships unable to get close to shore. Lifeboats have rescue and safety functions.

Boats can be propelled by manpower (e.g., rowboats and paddle boats), wind (e.g., sailboats), and inboard/outboard motors (including gasoline, diesel, and electric).

== History ==
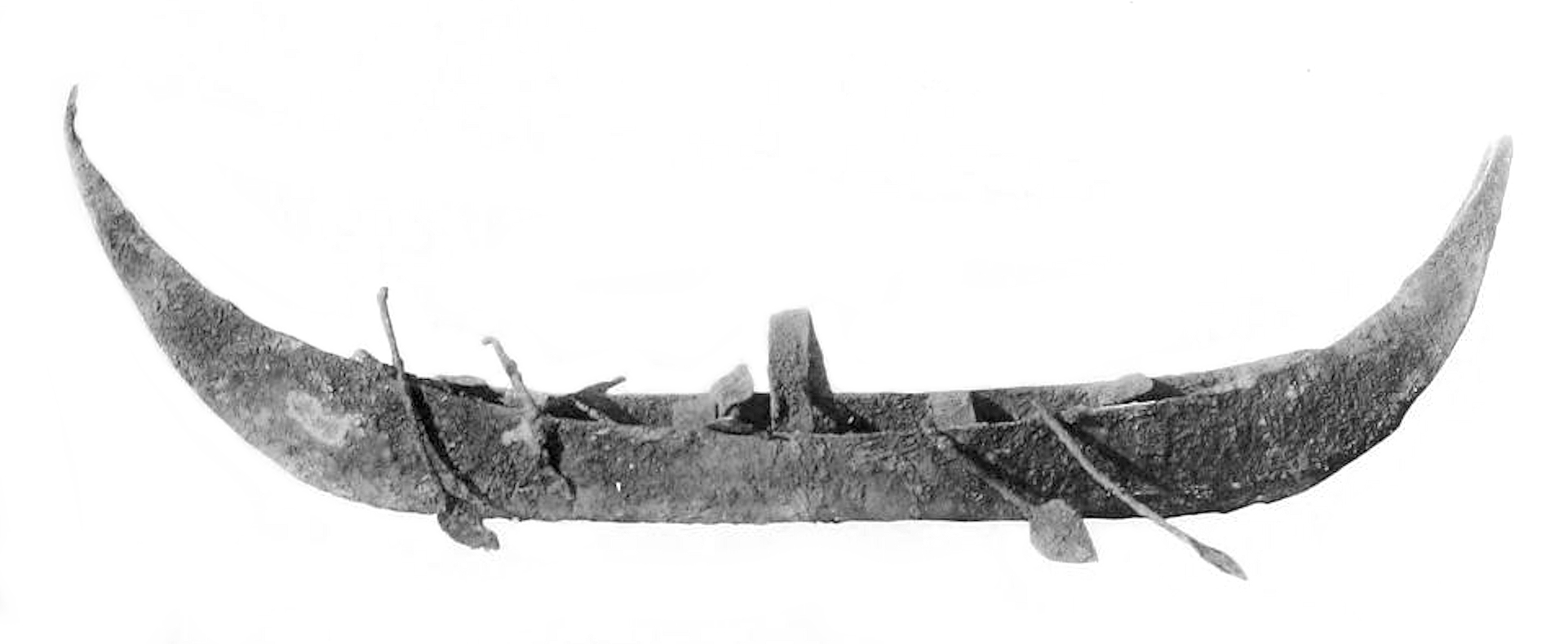
Silver model of a boat, tomb PG 789, Royal Cemetery of Ur, 2600–2500 BCE

=== Differentiation from other prehistoric watercraft ===
The earliest watercraft are considered to have been rafts. These would have been used for voyages such as the settlement of Australia, which occurred sometime between 50,000 and 60,000 years ago.

A boat differs from a raft by obtaining its buoyancy by having most of its structure exclude water with a waterproof layer, e.g., the planks of a wooden hull, the hide covering (or tarred canvas) of a currach. In contrast, a raft is buoyant because it joins components that are themselves buoyant, such as logs, bamboo poles, bundles of reeds, and floats (such as inflated hides, sealed pottery containers, or, in a modern context, empty oil drums). The key difference between a raft and a boat is that the former is a "flow through" structure, with waves able to pass up through it. Consequently, except for short river crossings, a raft is not a practical means of transport in colder regions of the world, as the users would be at risk of hypothermia. Today, that climatic limitation restricts rafts to between 40° north and 40° south, with similar boundaries in the past that have shifted as the world's climate has varied.

=== Types ===
The earliest boats may have been either dugouts or hide boats. The oldest recovered boat in the world, the Pesse canoe, found in the Netherlands, is a dugout made from the hollowed tree trunk of a Pinus sylvestris that was constructed somewhere between 8200 and 7600 BC. This canoe is exhibited in the Drents Museum in Assen, Netherlands. Other very old dugout boats have also been recovered. Hide boats, made from covering a framework with animal skins, could be equally as old as logboats, but such a structure is much less likely to survive in an archaeological context.

Plank-built boats are considered, in most cases, to have developed from the logboat. There are examples of logboats that have been expanded: by deforming the hull under heat, by raising the sides with added planks, or by splitting down the middle and adding a central plank to widen it. (Some of these methods have been in quite recent use – there is no simple developmental sequence). The earliest known plank-built boats are from the Nile, dating to the third millennium BC. Outside Egypt, the next earliest are from England. The Ferriby boats are dated to the early second millennium BC and the end of the third millennium BC. Plank-built boats require a level of woodworking technology that was first available in the Neolithic with more complex versions only becoming achievable in the Bronze Age.

== Types ==
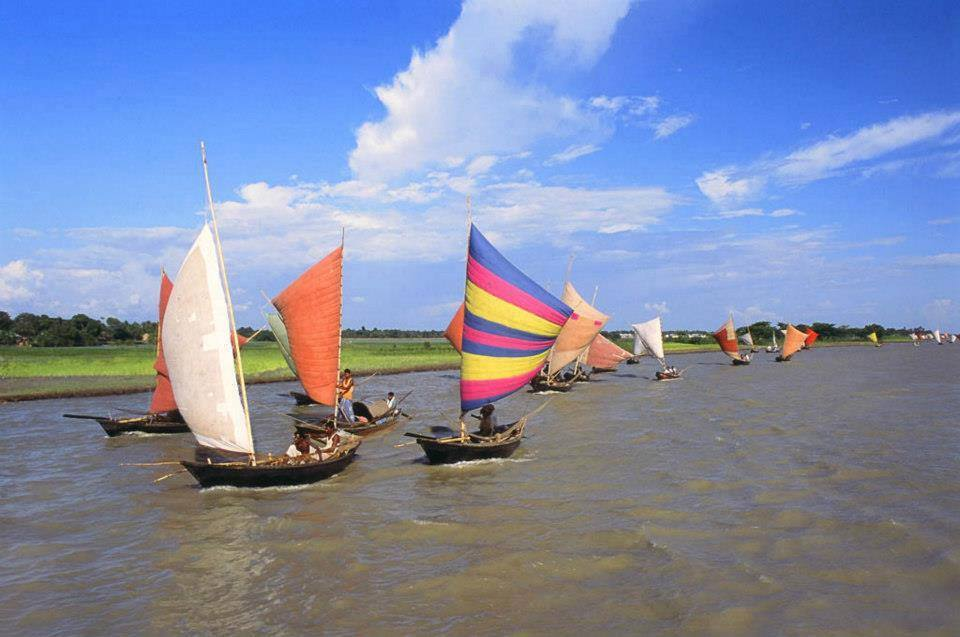
Boats with sails in Bangladesh

Boats can be categorized by their means of propulsion. These divide into:

1. Unpowered. This involves drifting with the tide or a river current.
2. Powered by the crew-members on board, using oars, paddles or a punting pole or quant.
3. Powered by sail.
4. Towed – either by humans or animals from a river or canal bank (or in very shallow water, by walking on the sea or river bed) or by another vessel.
5. Powered by machinery, such as internal combustion engines, steam engines, or by batteries and an electric motor.
  Any one vessel may use more than one of these methods at different times or in combination.

Several large vessels are usually referred to as boats. Submarines are a prime example. Other types of large vessels which are traditionally called boats include Great Lakes freighters, riverboats, and ferryboats. Though large enough to carry their own boats and heavy cargo, these vessels are designed for operation on inland or protected coastal waters.

== Terminology ==
The hull is the main, and in some cases only, structural component of a boat. It provides both capacity and buoyancy. The keel is a boat's "backbone", a lengthwise structural member to which the perpendicular frames are fixed. On some boats, a deck covers the hull, in part or whole. While a ship often has several decks, a boat is unlikely to have more than one. Above the deck are often lifelines connected to stanchions, bulwarks, perhaps topped by gunnels, or some combination of the two. A cabin may protrude above the deck forward, aft, along the centerline, or cover much of the length of the boat. Vertical structures dividing the internal spaces are known as bulkheads.

The forward end of a boat is called the bow, the aft end the stern. Facing forward the right side is referred to as starboard and the left side as port.

== Building materials ==
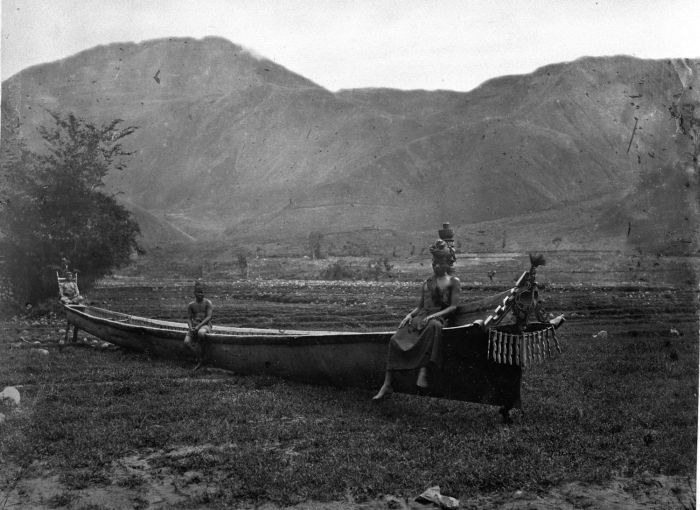
Traditional Toba Batak boat (c. 1870), photograph by Kristen Feilberg

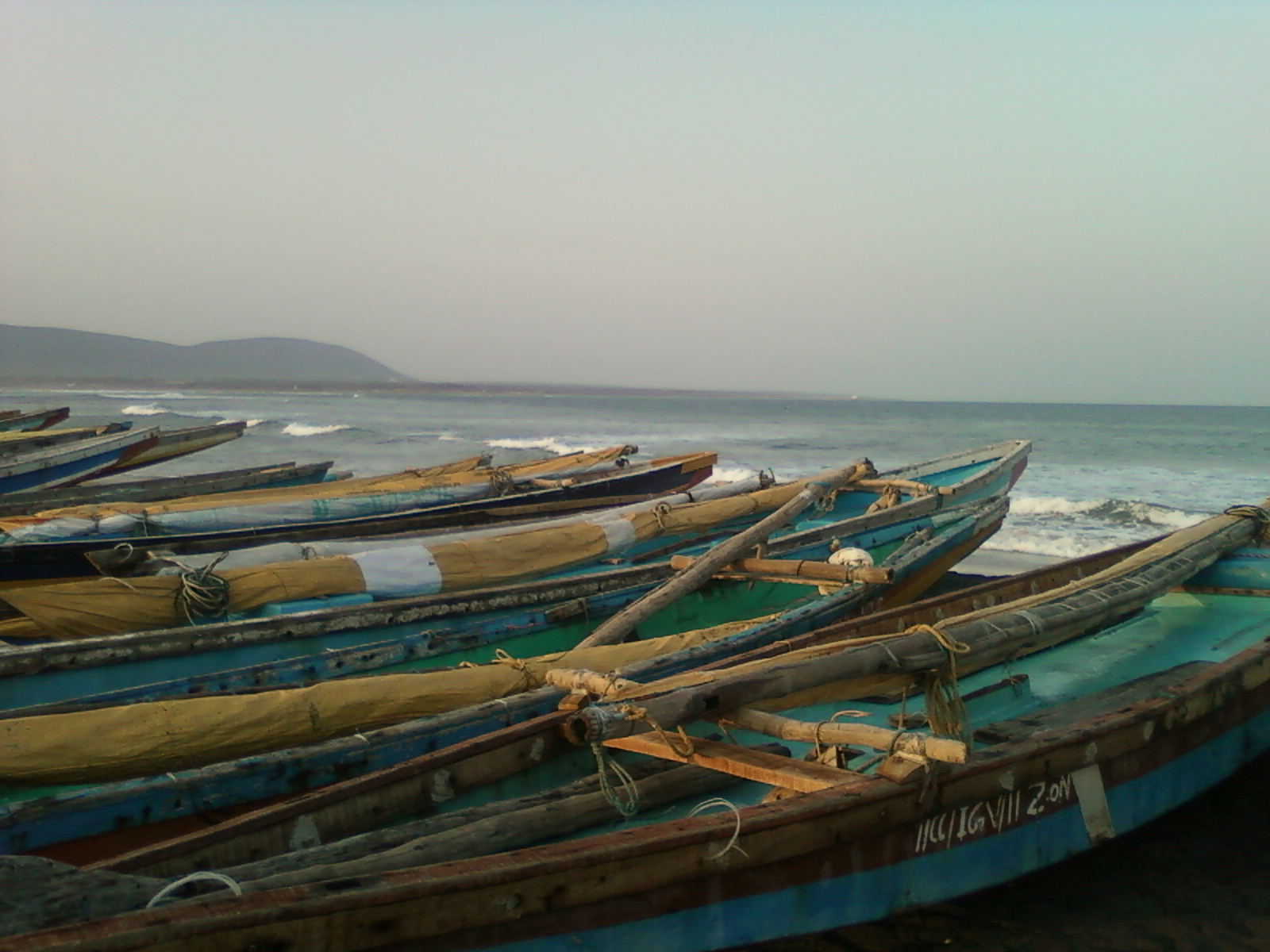
Fishing boats in Visakhapatnam, India

Until the mid-19th century, most boats were made of natural materials, primarily wood, although bark and animal skins were also used. Early boats include the birch bark canoe, the animal hide-covered kayak and coracle and the dugout canoe made from a single log.

By the mid-19th century, some boats had been built with iron or steel frames but still planked in wood. In 1855, ferro-cement boat construction was patented by the French, who coined the name "ferciment". This is a system by which a steel or iron wire framework is built in the shape of a boat's hull and covered over with cement. Reinforced with bulkheads and other internal structures, it is strong but heavy, easily repaired, and, if sealed properly, will not leak or corrode.

As the forests of Britain and Europe continued to be over-harvested to supply the keels of larger wooden boats, and the Bessemer process (patented in 1855) reduced the cost of steel, steel ships and boats became more common. By the 1930s, boats built entirely of steel, from frames to plating, were replacing wooden boats in many industrial uses and fishing fleets. Private recreational steel boats remain uncommon. In 1895, WH Mullins produced steel boats of galvanized iron, and by 1930, became the world's largest producer of pleasure boats.

Mullins also offered aluminium boats from 1895 through 1899 and once again in the 1920s, but it was not until the mid-20th century that aluminium gained widespread popularity. Though much more expensive than steel, certain aluminum alloys do not corrode in salt water, allowing them to carry loads comparable to steel at much lower weight.

Around the mid-1960s, boats made of fiberglass (aka "glass fiber") became popular, especially for recreational boats. Fiberglass is also known as "GRP" (glass-reinforced plastic) in the UK and "FRP" (fiber-reinforced plastic) in the US. Fiberglass boats are strong and do not rust, corrode, or rot. Instead, they are susceptible to structural degradation from sunlight and temperature extremes over their lifespan. Fiberglass structures can be made stiffer with sandwich panels, where the fiberglass encloses a lightweight core such as balsa wood or foam.

Cold molding is a modern construction method that uses wood as the structural component. In a single cold-molding process, very thin strips of wood are layered over a form. Each layer is coated with resin, then another layer is laid on top at a 90-degree angle. Subsequent layers may be stapled or otherwise mechanically fastened to the previous layer, or weighted or vacuum-bagged to provide compression and stabilization until the resin sets. An alternative process uses thin plywood sheets shaped over a disposable male mold and coated with epoxy.

== Propulsion ==
The most common means of boat propulsion are as follows:

- Engine
  - Inboard motor
  - Stern drive (Inboard/outboard)
  - Outboard motor
  - Paddle wheel
  - Water jet (jetboat, personal water craft)
  - Fan (hovercraft, air boat)
- Man (rowing, paddling, setting pole etc.)
- Wind (sailing)

== Buoyancy ==
A boat displaces its weight in water, regardless of whether it is made of wood, steel, fiberglass, or even concrete. If weight is added to the boat, the volume of the hull submerged below the waterline will increase to keep the weight above and below the surface balanced. Boats have a natural or designed level of buoyancy. Exceeding it will cause the boat first to ride lower in the water, second to take on water more readily than when properly loaded, and ultimately, if overloaded by any combination of structure, cargo, and water, sink.

As commercial vessels must be correctly loaded to be safe, and as the sea becomes less buoyant in brackish areas such as the Baltic, the Plimsoll line was introduced to prevent overloading.

== European Union classification ==
Since 1998, all new leisure boats and barges built in Europe between 2.5m and 24m must comply with the EU's Recreational Craft Directive (RCD). The Directive establishes four categories that permit the allowable wind and wave conditions for vessels in each class:

- Class A – the boat may safely navigate any waters.
- Class B – the boat is limited to offshore navigation. (Winds up to Force 8 & waves up to 4 metres)
- Class C – the boat is limited to inshore (coastal) navigation. (Winds up to Force 6 & waves up to 2 metres)
- Class D – the boat is limited to rivers, canals, and small lakes. (Winds up to Force 4 & waves up to 0.5 metres)

Europe is the main producer of recreational boats (the second-largest producer in the world is Poland). European brands are known all over the world – in fact, these are the brands that created RCD and set the standard for shipyards around the world.

== See also ==
- Abora
- Barge
- Boat club
- Cabin cruiser
- Car float
- Dinghy
- Dory
- Flatboat
- Halkett boat
- Inflatable boat
- Launch (boat)
- Log canoe
- Narrowboat
- Naval architecture
- Panga (boat)
- Pirogue
- Poveiro
- Rescue craft
- Sampan
- Ship's boat
- Skiff
- Tour boat
- Traditional fishing boats
- Tûranor PlanetSolar
- Yacht
