= Tether =

Cord for anchoring a movable object

A tether is a cord, fixture, or flexible attachment that characteristically anchors something movable to something fixed; it also may be used to connect two movable objects, such as an item being towed by its tow.

Applications for tethers include: fall arrest systems, lanyards, balloons, kites, airborne wind-power systems, anchors, floating water power systems, towing, animal constraint, space walks, power kiteing, and anti-theft devices.

== Failure ==
Failure modes for tethers are considered in their design. A cord or rope tether may reach its breaking strength and fail. Outcomes can include an injury or fatal fall, and damage or loss of life to personnel or bystanders caused by backlash of the ruptured segments.

Failure-prevention may be designed into a tethering system. Some safety harnesses are used in combination with a shock-absorbing lanyard, which has break-away stitching designed into it to prevent material failure and regulate deceleration, thereby preventing a serious G-force injury to the user when the end of the rope is reached.

Designed-to-fail safety links are sometimes used to prevent excessive tension in a tether involved in towing objects, such as sailplanes.

A signal tether is a system in which a constant signal designates a positive condition, and its interruption, whether by discontinuation or jamming, conveys a failure. The signal may be electrically generated, or a physical device such as flying a flag.

== See also ==
- Umbilical cable
- Safety lanyard
