= Wire fu =

Mix of Chinese martial arts and cinematic visual effects

Wire fu is an element or style of Hong Kong action cinema used in fight scenes. It is a combination of two terms: "wire work" and "kung fu".

Wire fu is used to describe a subgenre of kung fu films where the stuntmen's or actor's skill is augmented with the use of wires and pulleys, as well as other stage techniques, usually to perform fight-scene stunts and give the illusion of super-human ability (or qinggong). It is exemplified by the works of Tsui Hark, Yuen Woo-ping, and Jet Li. Hollywood has subsequently adopted the style for the American film industry. Almost all modern wuxia films fall in this category. Not all martial arts films use wire work.

== In practice ==
The basic concept is not complex and originates in the mechanical effects of stagecraft. Planning and persistence are important as it often requires many takes to perfect the stunt.

Typically, a harness is hidden under the actor's costume, and a cable and pulley system is attached to the harness. When live sets are used, wire removal is done in post-production. Another later-developed technique of creating wire fu is using a green screen and post-production special effects. Green screening the wire work is done for more complex stunts and camera angles. The actors are suspended in the air by green wires, which are then erased digitally during the post-production process. The process by which this was done in older (pre-digital) movies was to use film coloration techniques in a method similar to animation; artists (usually animators), would painstakingly go frame by frame over the raw footage and color in the wires to match the background.

Wire work is often used in kung fu films to allow actors to perform stunts beyond their physical abilities. In movies such as Crouching Tiger, Hidden Dragon, it is used to create a more dramatic effect and adds magical realism to the world in which the film takes place. "Wire fu is used to describe a sub genre of kung fu films where the stuntmen's or actor's skill is augmented with the use of wires and pulleys"

== Examples of wire fu films ==
- Sister Street Fighter (1974), aka Onna Hissatsu Ken
- Once Upon a Time in China (1991), aka Wong Fei-Hung
- Fong Sai-yuk (1993), aka Fang Shi Yu or The Legend of Fong Sai-yuk
- Iron Monkey (1993), aka Siu Nin Wong Fei Hung Chi: Tit Ma Lau
- The Matrix (1999)
- Crouching Tiger, Hidden Dragon (2000), aka Wo Hu Cang Long
- X-Men (2000)
- Charlie's Angels (2000)
- Spider-Man (2002)
- Austin Powers in Goldmember (2002)
- Hero (2002), aka Ying Xiong
- Kill Bill: Volume 1 (2003)
- House of Flying Daggers (2004), aka Shi Mian Mai Fu
- Mulan (2020)
- Shang-Chi and the Legend of the Ten Rings (2021)

== See also ==
- Gun fu
- Wire-flying
- Stunt rigging
