= Rigger (entertainment) =

Entertainment industry job

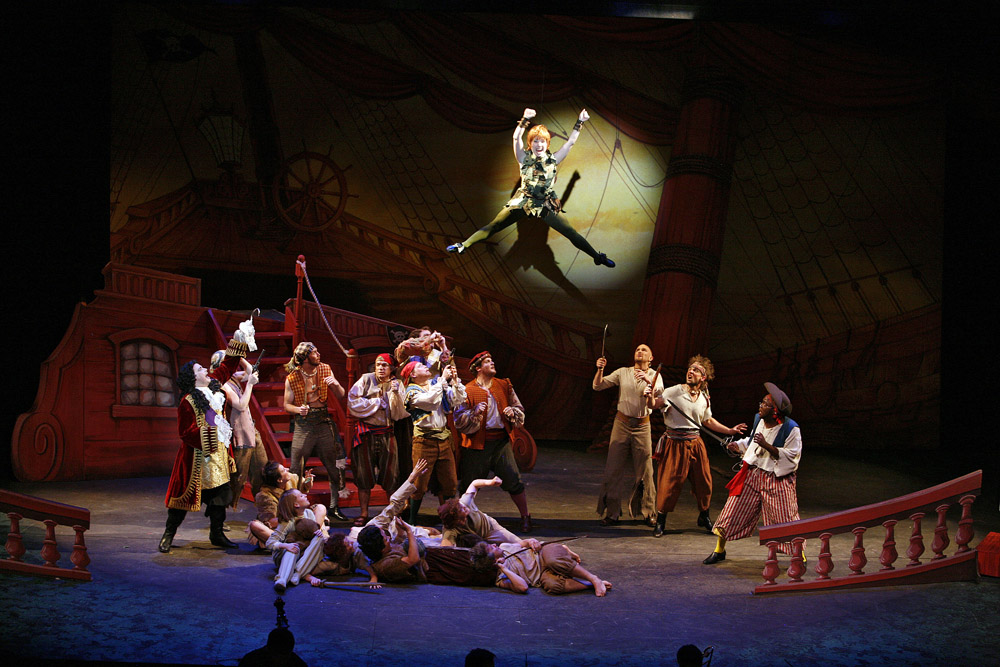
The stage play of Peter Pan is based on wire-flying.

A rigger is a worker using equipment like ropes, booms, lifts, and hoists for a stage production, film, or television show.

The term "rigger" originally referred to a person who attended to the rigging of a sailing ship. In the age of sail, trading followed seasonal patterns with ships leaving port at set times of the year to make the most of winds. When not at sea sailors would seek employment ashore. Their skill with ropes and booms found use in the theatre.

The original canvas backdrops used in the theatre moved with ropes and pulleys, being developed from techniques used for sails. It is from these roots that modern fly systems emerged. This also gave rise to the tradition in British theatres of never whistling on stage because the riggers would use the same whistled instructions on stage as they did aboard ship. A misplaced whistle could be taken as an instruction to the riggers to change the set.

The term rigger is still used for people backstage in theatres, the road crew for a live concert, conventions and trade shows, and by extension to similar jobs such as those who are responsible for fastening chain motors (like CM Lodestar, EXE Rise, or Chainmaster) by wire rope to the structural steel of a building.

Since the start of the film industry, stage techniques were adapted to the new medium, by stage actors and by back stage crew. The complexity of the new environment giving rise to specializations such as those in the film industry who rig scaffolding for film sets and camera rigs; also termed as a standby rigger if they are on site and on call all of the time.

== Wire riggers ==
In the industries of theater and film, a wire rigger is a worker in the special effects and stunts film crew who flies actors. They are responsible for rigging special harnesses to attached wires which are run through a series of blocks (pulleys) to a control area. There, a wire rigger manipulates a harnessed actor for wire-flying, or for wire fu which simulates the impact from a punch, kick, or explosion. With stunts, it is also called stunt rigging. Wire riggers also rig up rails along which travels a skate from which the wire is attached. Many plays and feature films use this technique, such as Peter Pan, Harry Potter, and Superman. In films, wire removal is done in post-production to remove the wires from the scene to maintain the illusion.

== See also ==
- Safety harness
