= Badge tether =

Spring-loaded reeled tether that resembles a button badge

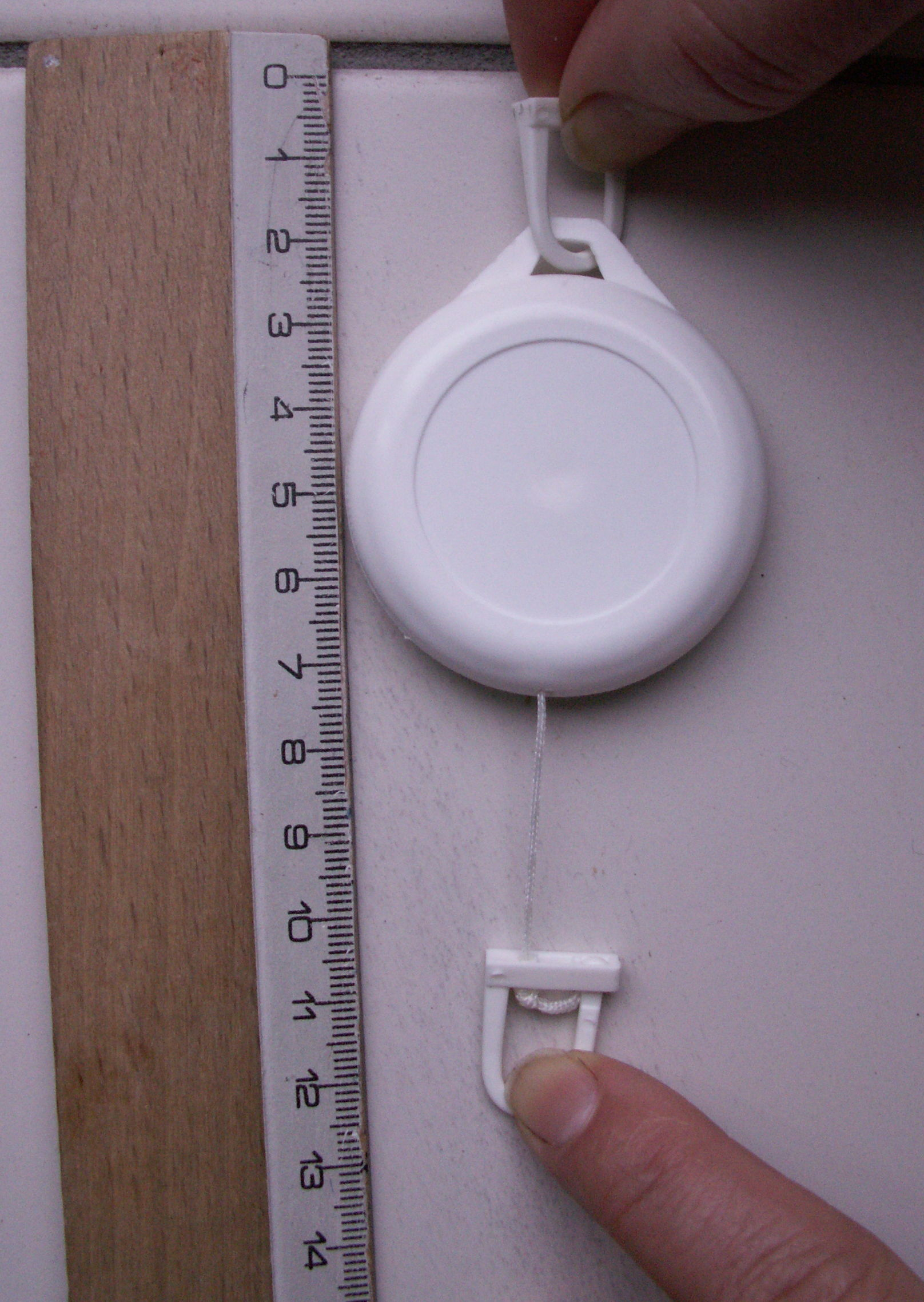
A badge tether with clips suited for skiwear and a ski pass, since skiwear typically has dedicated loops for attachment.

A badge tether or badge reel is a spring-loaded reeled tether that resembles a button badge in appearance or attachment. It is used to avoid damage to or the loss of small important objects kept on-person that need to be accessed frequently or quickly, such as a ski pass, identification card or badge, name badge, keys, a phone or other handheld device, or a penknife or other small tool.

Badge tethers consist of a thin cord, dimensions on the order of a millimetre diameter by a metre long with one end wound round a spring-loaded reel contained within a small badge-like body that has a clip for a belt, belt loop, pocket, the edge of the clothing itself, or an attachment specifically for such a tether. The other end of the cord has a clip, loop, splitring, strap, or other fastener.

== History ==
Early spring-loaded wearable reels were patented as early as 1918, however, the modern retractable reel was popularized in 1948 by Wilburn Russell Lummis after witnessing railroad workers suffer injuries when dangling key chains snagged on moving rail cars. Lummis went on to found West Coast Chain Manufacturing Co., developing the self-retracting KEY-BAK reel, for which he was granted a patent in 1956.

Following the introduction of electronic access control systems (such as Radio-frequency identification proximity cards), specially adapted plastic body reels, such as the MINI-BAK introduced in 1981, were created with identification cards in mind. Later patents introduced flat front surfaces ("billboards") for displaying institutional logos, clothing attachments, and coupling systems capable of hosting supplementary displays mounted alongside the main identification badge.
