= Reel =

Device used to store elongated and flexible objects

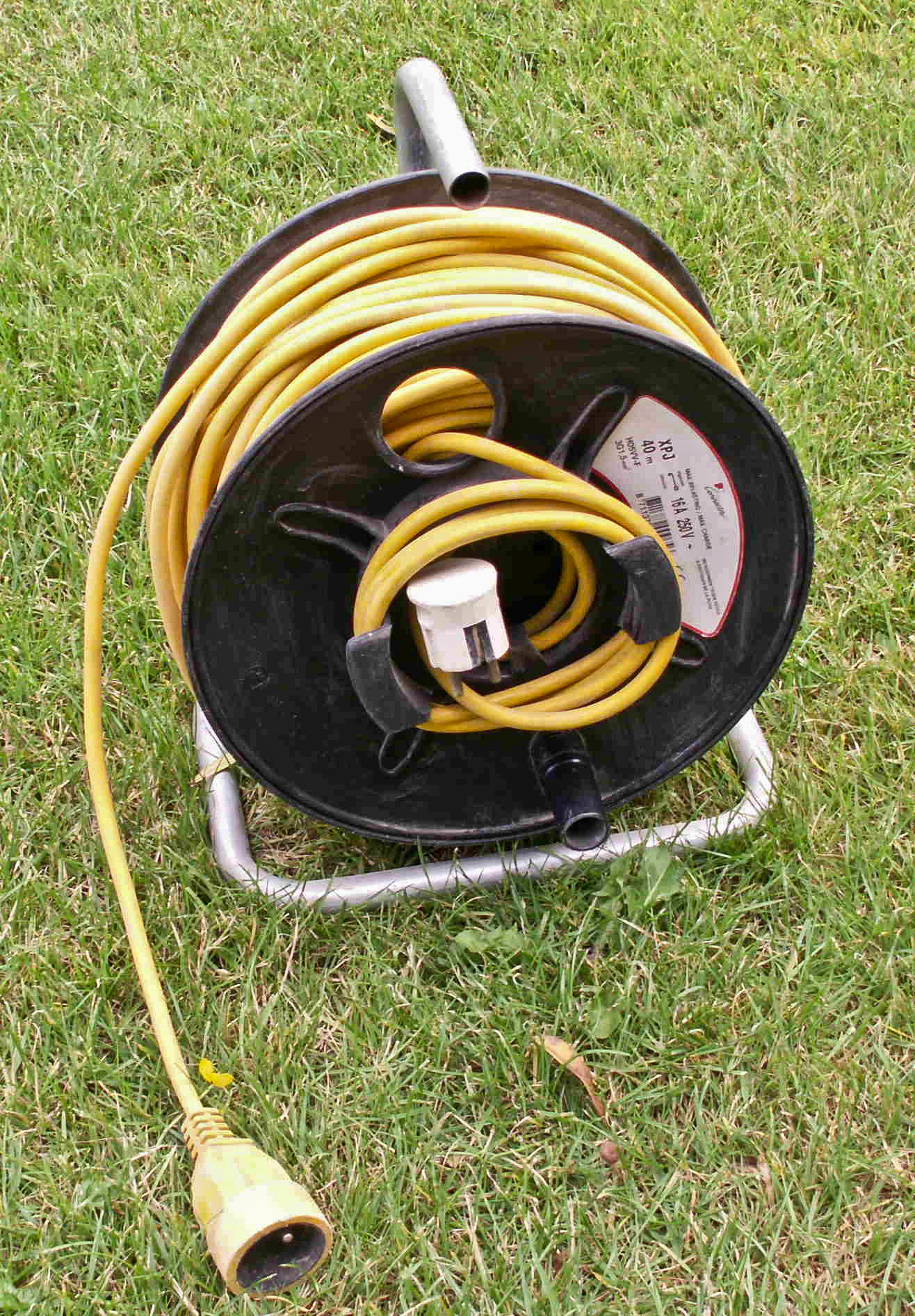
A 250 V 16 A electrical wire on a reel

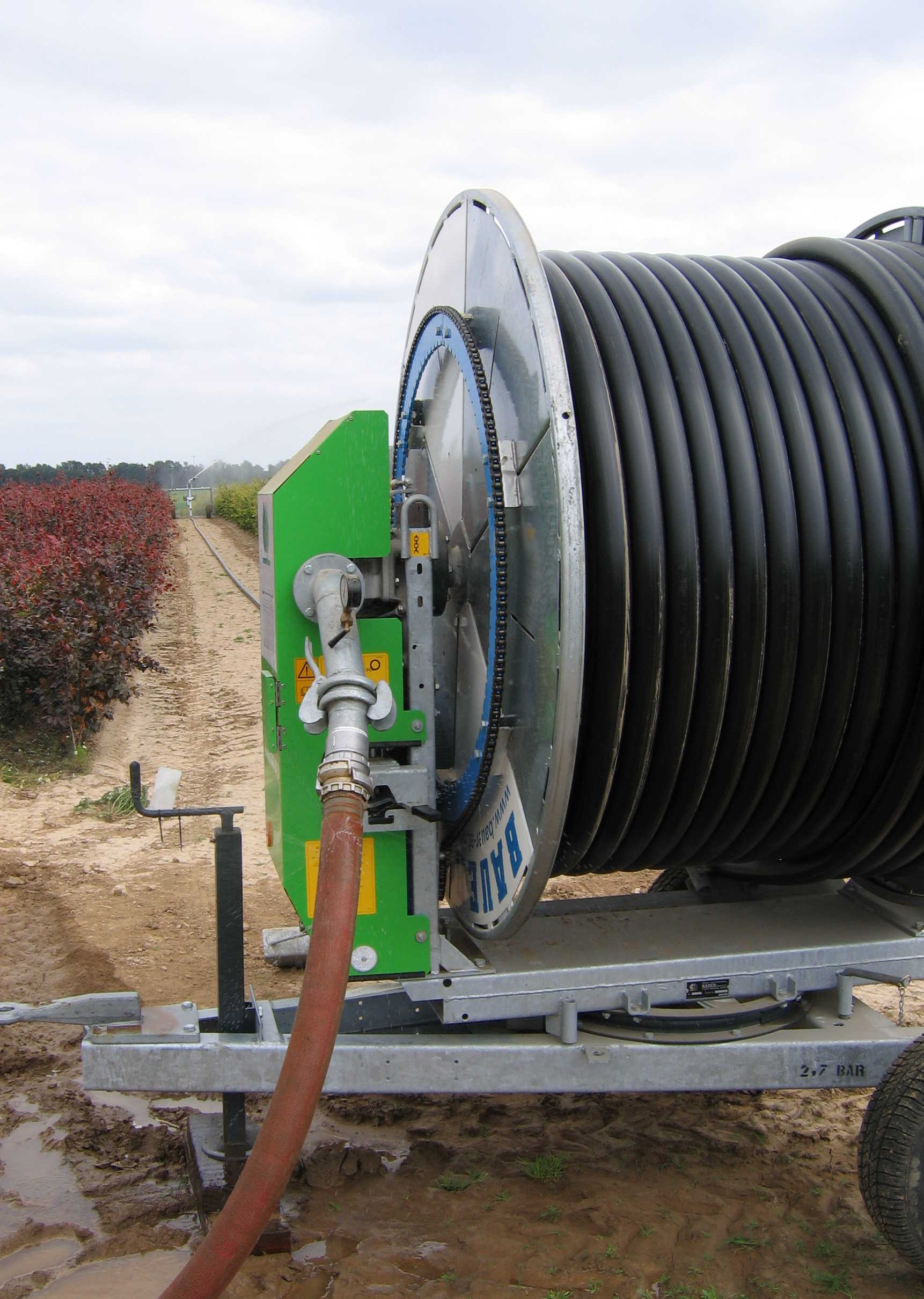
An irrigation reel with travelling sprinkler

A reel is a tool used to store elongated and flexible objects (e.g. yarns/cords, ribbons, cables, hoses, etc.) by wrapping the material around a cylindrical core known as a spool. Many reels also have flanges (known as the rims) around the ends of the spool to help retain the wrapped material and prevent unwanted slippage off the ends. In most cases, the reel spool is hollow in order to pass an axle and allow it to spin like a wheel, a winding process known as reeling, which can be done by manually turning the reel with handles or cranks, or by machine-powered rotating via (typically electric) motors.

== Construction ==
The size of the core is dependent on several factors. A smaller core will obviously allow more material to be stored in a given space. However, there is a limit to how tightly the stored material can be wound without damaging it and this limits how small the core can be.

Other issues affecting the core size include:

- Mechanical strength of the core (especially with big reels).
- Acceptable turning speed (for a given rate of material moving on or off the reel a smaller core will mean that an almost empty reel has to turn faster).
- any functional requirements of the core e.g.
  - For a reel that must be mechanically turned the size of the grips that mount it on the mechanical turning device.
  - The size of the mountings needed to support the core during unwinding.
  - Anything mounted on the cores (e.g. the sockets on an extension reel).

With material such as photographic film that is flat and long but is relatively wide, the material generally is stored in successive single layers. In cases where the material is more uniform in cross-section (for example, a cable), the material may be safely wound around a reel that is wider than its width. In this case, several windings are needed to create a layer on the reel.

== Uses ==
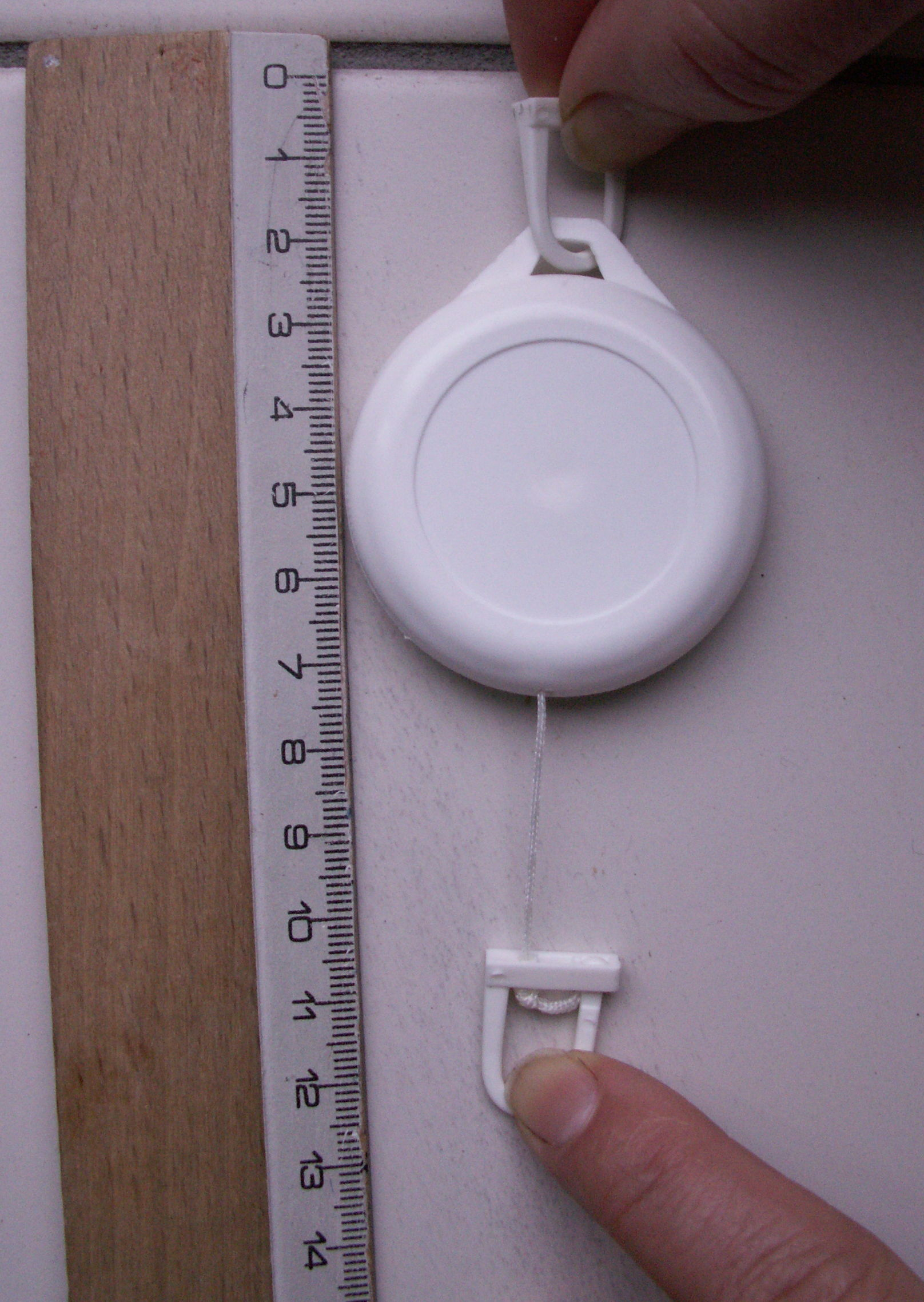
A badge reel

Examples of reel usage include:

- Hose reels that store and prevent kinking of fire hoses or garden hoses
- Bobbins that hold yarns or threads for sewing machines and weavers
- Retractable tape measures
- Fishing reels that store and pull in fishing lines when angling
- Film reels that carry film stocks
- Many audio recordings of the late 20th century (and some today) use reel-to-reel magnetic tape
- Kite lines are frequently operated from reels
- Specialized reels for holding tow line for hang glider, glider, and sailplane launching
- Laying of communications cables use giant reels
- Winches that wind cables/chains for sails or anchors on ships
- Windlasses that are used to wind and pull rope or chains in order to lift weights on implements such as a crane, a well or a drawbridge
- Webbing barriers that allow mobile post positions collect tensionally excess webbing
- Tow trucks hold steel cable on reels
- Rope, wire and electrical cable is often supplied on reels
- Badge reels are used to hold access badges, smart cards and other externally tethered small items such as keys and clippers
- A cave diving reel is a safety equipment used for running a distance line

== Motion picture terminology ==
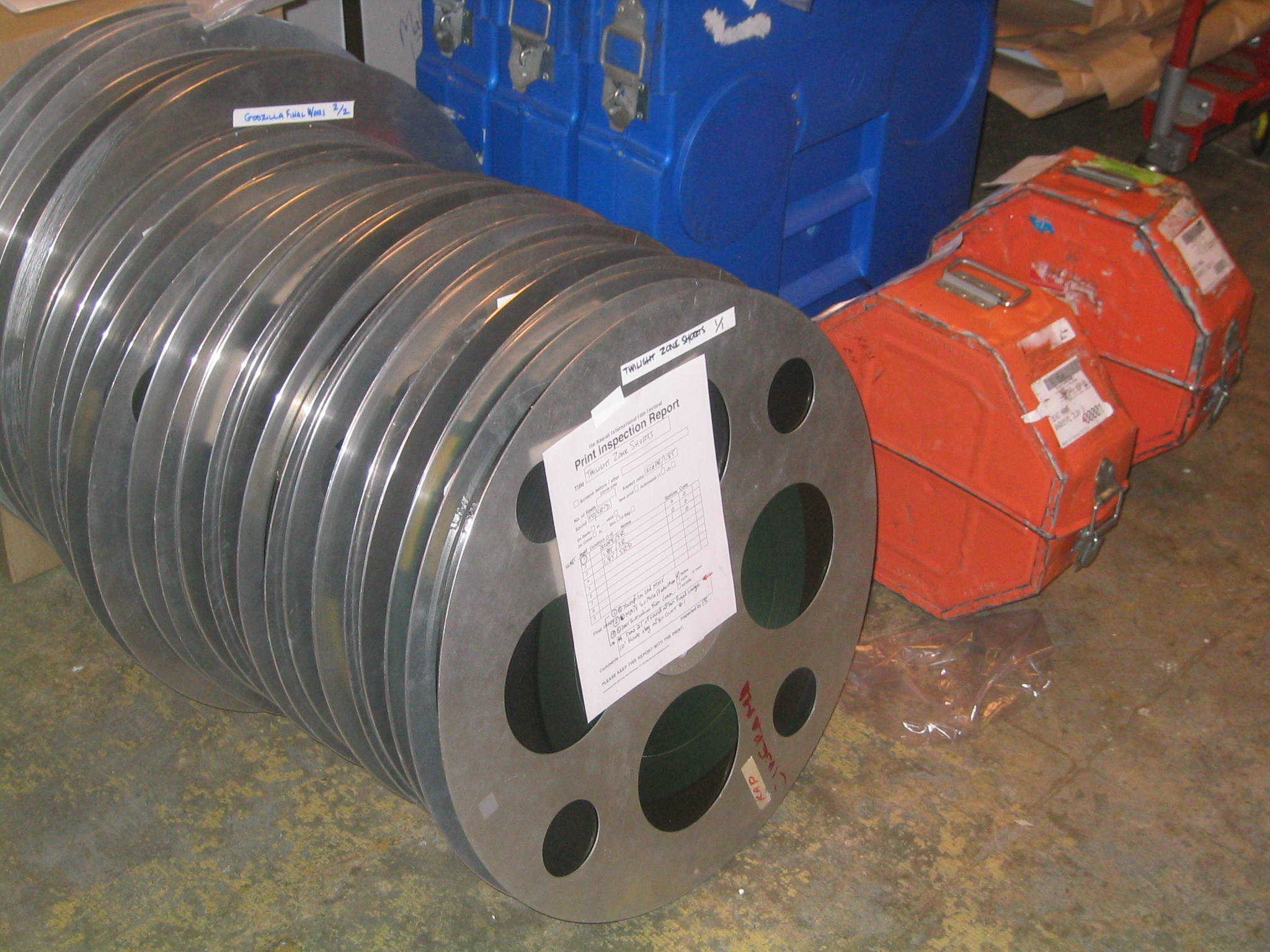
35mm film reels and boxes

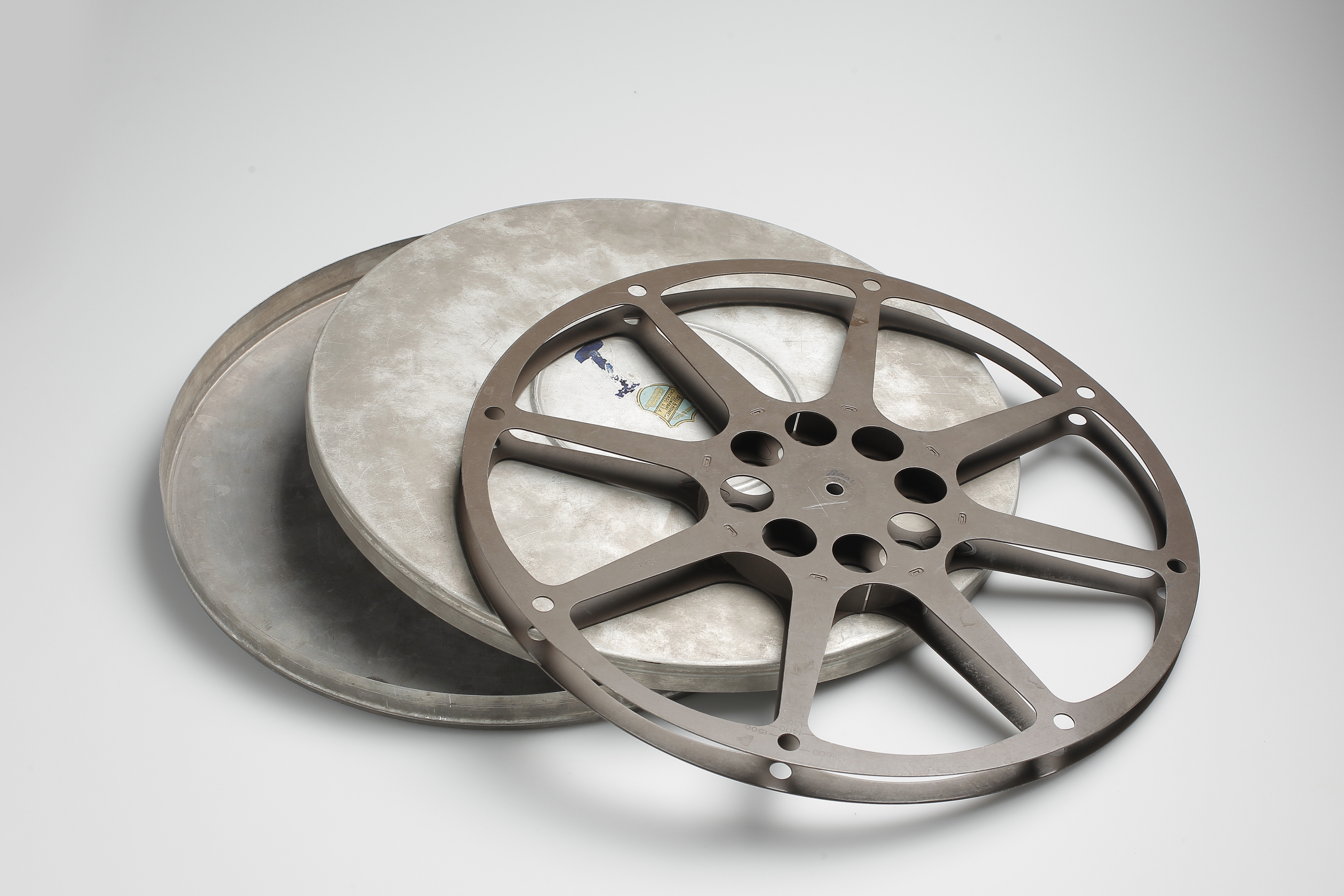
16mm empty film reel with its metal container

It is traditional to discuss the length of theatrical motion pictures in terms of "reels". The standard length of a 35 mm film reel is 1,000 feet (304.8 m), which runs approximately 11 minutes for sound film (24 frames per second) and about 15 minutes for silent film at the more or less standard speed of 18 frames per second. Most films have visible cues which mark the end of the reel. This allows projectionists running reel-to-reel to change over to the next reel on the other projector.

A so-called "two-reeler" short film would have run about 15–24 minutes since the actual short film shipped to a movie theater for exhibition may have had slightly less (but rarely more) than 1,000 ft (304.8 m) on it. Most modern projectionists use the term "reel" when referring to a 2,000-foot (609.6 m) "two-reeler", as modern films are rarely shipped by single 1,000-foot (304.8 m) reels. A standard Hollywood movie averages about five 2,000-foot reels in length.

The "reel" was established as a standard measurement because of considerations in printing motion picture film at a film laboratory, for shipping (especially the film case sizes) and for the size of the physical film magazine attached to the motion picture projector. If it had not been standardized (at 1,000 ft or 304.8 m of 35 mm film), there would have been many difficulties in the manufacture of the related equipment. A 16 mm "reel" is 400 feet (121.9 m). It runs, at sound speed, approximately the same amount of time (11–12 minutes) as a 1,000-foot (304.8 m) 35 mm reel.

A "split reel" is a motion picture film reel in two halves that, when assembled, hold a specific length of motion picture film that has been wound on a plastic core. Using a split reel allows film to be shipped or handled in a lighter and smaller form than film would on a "fixed" reel. In the silent era, the term was used to describe a single reel that accommodated two or more individual titles.

As digital cinema catches on, the physical reel is being replaced by a virtual format called Digital Cinema Package, which can be distributed using any storage medium (such as hard drives) or data transfer medium (such as the Internet) and projected using a digital projector instead of a conventional movie projector.

A newsreel is a short documentary film.

A showreel or demo reel is a short film showcasing a person's or organization's previous work.

== See also ==
- Spindle (tool)
