= Lanyard =

Necklace used to hold ID cards or other items

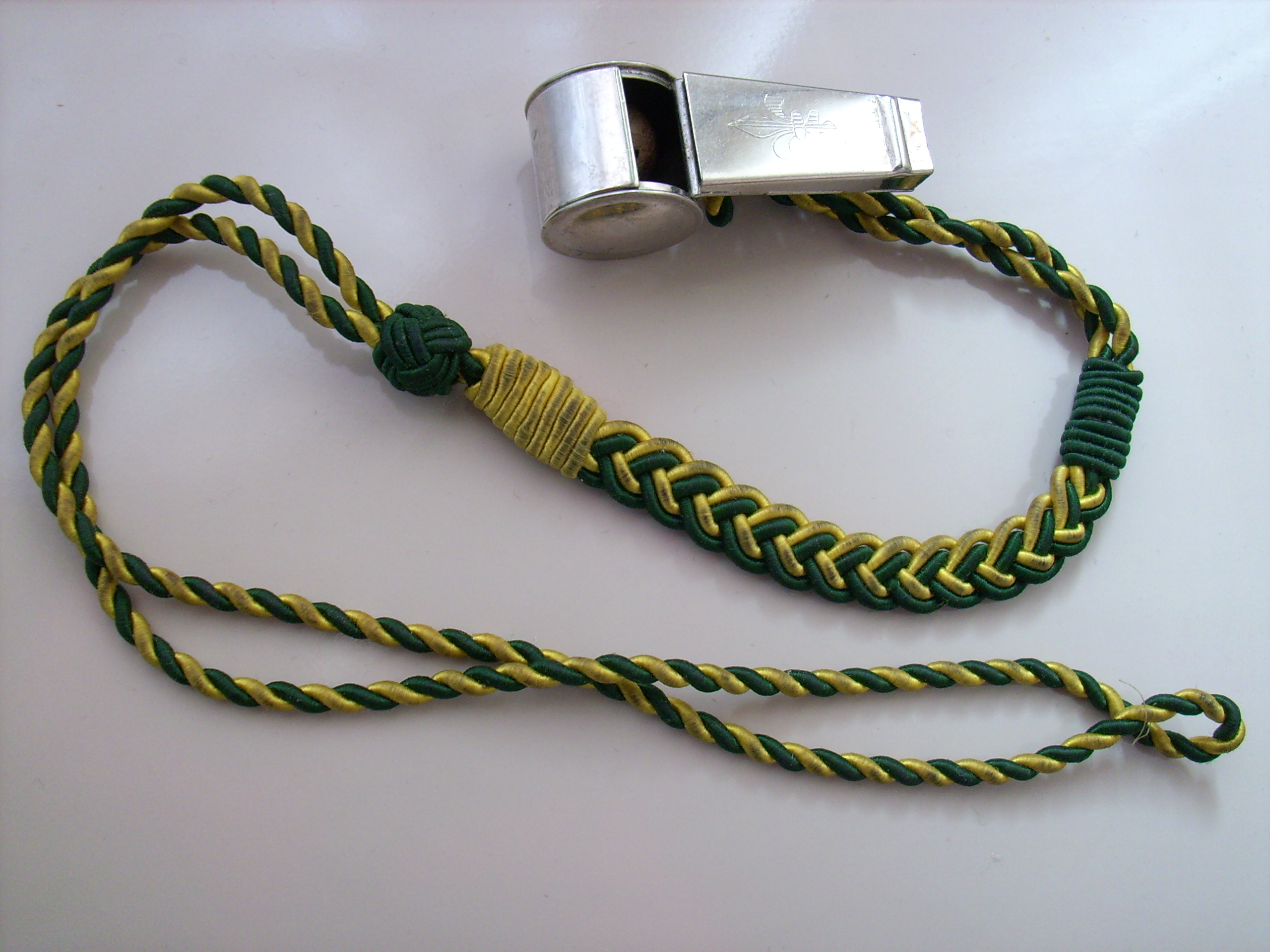
Whistle attached to a lanyard

A lanyard is a length of cord, webbing, or strap used for attachment, carrying, restraint, retrieval, activation, or deactivation. Lanyards range from light-duty straps worn around the neck, shoulder, wrist, or belt for carrying items such as keys, identification cards or badges, and small electronic devices, to safety equipment used for fall restraint, confined-space retrieval, and dead man's switches.

Historically, lanyards have been used to secure equipment such as weapons, whistles, marlinspikes, and knives. They are also worn on some military uniforms as decorative or identifying cords denoting qualifications or regimental affiliations.

Modern lanyards are made from polyester, nylon, silk, leather, paracord, polyethylene terephthalate (PET), and other materials.

== Origins ==
The earliest references to lanyards date from 15th century France: "lanière" was a thong or strap-on apparatus.

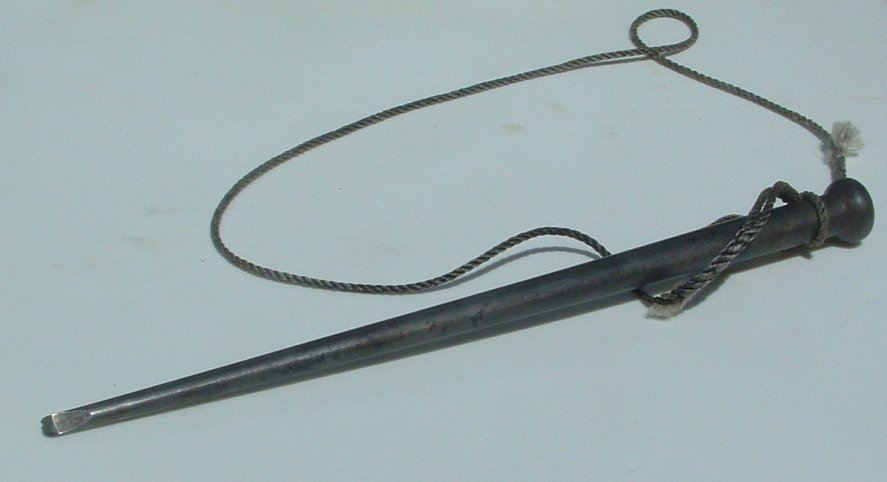
A typical marlinspike with lanyard

Bosun's pipe, marlinspike, and small knives typically had a lanyard consisting of a string loop tied together with a diamond knot. It helped secure the item and gave an extended grip over a small handle.

In the French military, lanyards were used to connect a pistol, sword, or whistle (for signaling) to a uniform semi-permanently. Lanyards were used by mounted cavalry on land and naval officers at sea. A pistol lanyard can be easily removed and reattached by the user, but will stay connected to the pistol whether it is drawn for use or it is placed into a holster for carrying.

In the military, lanyards of various colour combinations and braid patterns are worn on the shoulders of uniforms to denote the wearer's qualification or regimental affiliation. In horse regiments, lanyards were worn on the left, enabling a rider to pull a whistle from the left tunic pocket and maintain communication with his troop. Members of the British Royal Artillery wear a lanyard which originally held a key for adjusting the fuzes of explosive shells.

== Functions ==
- An attachment lanyard is a light duty tether worn around the neck, shoulder, wrist or attached to the belt as a sling to conveniently carry items such as keys or identification cards, or as a safety harness to prevent accidental dropping of valuable handheld items such as a camera.
- A restraint lanyard is a safety lanyard used by construction workers, such as a lineman.
- A retrieval lanyard is a nylon webbing lanyard used to raise and lower workers into confined spaces, such as storage tanks.
- An activation lanyard is a lanyard used to fire an artillery piece or arm the fuze on a bomb leaving an aircraft.
- A deactivation lanyard is a dead man's switch, where pulling a lanyard free will disable a dangerous device.

== Styles and materials ==
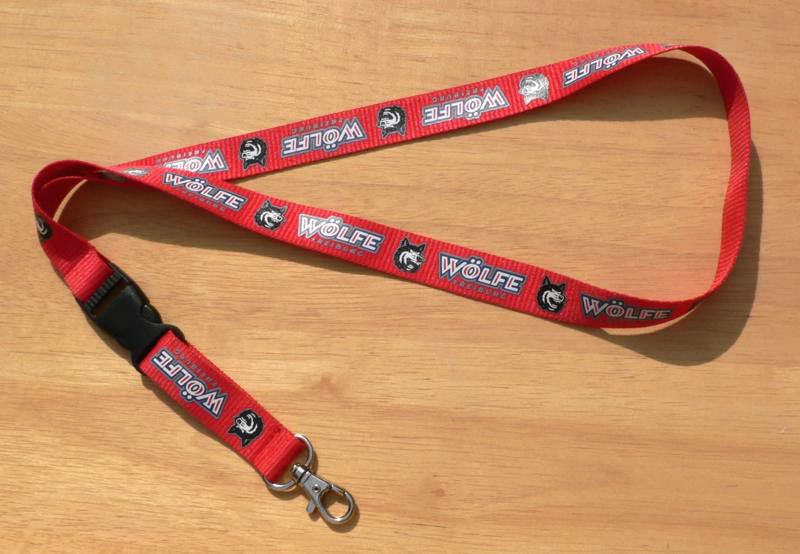
Light-duty webbing lanyard for attaching keys, with a metal clip similar to that of a leash

The style, design or material used will vary depending on end-purpose of the lanyard. Lanyard materials include polyester, nylon, satin, silk, polyethylene terephthalate (PET), braided leather or braided paracord.

=== Common styles ===
- Polyester imprinted lanyards
- Nylon imprinted lanyards
- Tube imprinted lanyards
- Dye-sublimated lanyards or full-color lanyards

=== Accessory for electronics ===
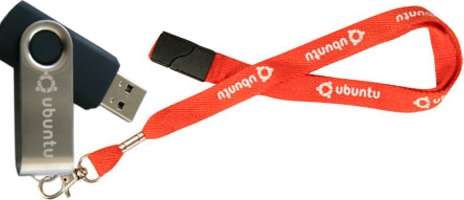
A USB flash drive with a webbing lanyard that includes a safety break-away feature – a predetermined and in this case reattachable segment (in black) meant to prevent accidental strangulation when the lanyard is worn around the neck

Lanyards are widely used with small electronic devices such as cameras, MP3 players and USB flash drives to prevent loss or dropping. Electronics designed to take a lanyard usually have a small through-hole built into a corner or edge of the case or anchored to the frame of the device; the corresponding lanyard generally has a loop of thread on the end that is attached to that hole with a simple knot, usually a cow hitch. Some earphones incorporate the audio signal into the lanyard, meaning it doubles up as headphone cords as well. The Wii Remote wrist strap is a form of lanyard, keeping the device attached to a player's arm during the often vigorous movements involved in its use.

=== Badge or identification holder ===
Lanyards, not to be confused with badge tethers, are commonly used to display badges, tickets or ID cards for identification where security is required, such as businesses, corporations, hospitals, prisons, conventions, trade fairs, and backstage passes used in the entertainment industry. Such lanyards are often made of braided or woven fabric or split with a clip attached to the end. A plastic pouch or badge holder with at least one clear side is attached to the lanyard with the person's name badge or ID card. Occasionally, small items like business cards, pens or tools can be placed behind the badge for easy access. Lanyards can also be used as keychains, particularly in situations where keys can easily be lost, such as gyms, public pools and communal showers.

In these cases, lanyards may be customised with the related name and/or logo of the event, business, or organisation. Lanyards can feature a variety of customisation techniques including screen-printing, Jacquard loom weaving, heat transfer, and offset printing.

=== Safety strap ===
Lanyards are also often attached to dead man's switches or "kill switches" on dangerous machinery, such as large industrial cutting or slicing machines, vehicles, jet-skis or trains, and exercise treadmills, so that if the operator suddenly becomes incapacitated, their fall will pull on the lanyard attached to their wrist, which will then pull the switch to immediately stop the machine or vehicle.

Some law enforcement officers and members of the military utilise specialised lanyards to keep sidearms from falling to the ground during missions.

Many ID card lanyards have a built-in feature known as a "breakaway" closure. Breakaway lanyards release when pulled or when pressure is applied. This prevents choking or hanging. Lanyards with a breakaway feature are most often used in hospitals and healthcare clinics, schools, nursing homes, child care facilities, and factories that require employees to operate machinery.

=== Lineman lanyards ===
Lineman lanyards are used by lineworker utility and other workers to prevent falls, although similar straps are also used recreationally by mountain climbers. This type of lanyard will have a section of heavy-duty nylon strapping attached to a metal ring or carabiner which tightens around an attachment point. The strap may be a fixed length or adjustable, and will attach to the wearer to support them against a fixed object or pole.

=== Uniform accessories ===
Certain lanyards are still worn on uniforms as decorations similar to an aiguillette or fourragère. Among these are the Orange Lanyard in the Military William Order of the Netherlands and the German Armed Forces Badge of Marksmanship.

A white lanyard has formed part of the uniform of Britain's Royal Artillery (RA) since the end of the 19th century. Originally a simple cord carrying a fuse key, the braided and whitened lanyard became the recognised distinction of a Gunner. The distinction was extended to women of the Auxiliary Territorial Service attached to RA units during World War II. Certain battalions descended from the Durham Light Infantry wore green lanyards to denote their past links with the regiment, whose uniform had a dark green facing colour from 1903 onwards.

Royal Naval ratings wear a white lanyard when dressed in No. 1 uniform; the origin of the lanyard was to carry a pouch of gunpowder for the cannon.

== See also ==
- Access badge
- Halyard
- Rope splicing
