= Wire removal =

Visual effects technique

Wire removal is a visual effects technique used to remove wires in films, where the wires are originally included as a safety precaution or to simulate flying in actors or miniatures. It uses a lot of rotomatting, a process of using splines in a program like After Effects or Nuke to extract a subject from a video, motion tracking, and painting over footage, which can be done in Photoshop, Boris Silhouette, or Nuke.

Wire removal can be partly automated through various forms of keying, or each frame can be edited manually. First, the live action plates of actors or models suspended on wires are filmed in front of a green screen. Editors can then erase the wires frame by frame, without worrying about erasing the backdrop, which will be added later. This can be accomplished automatically with a computer. If the sequence is not filmed in front of a green-screen, or with a green wire a digital editor must hand-paint the lines out. This can be an arduous and time consuming task.

The modern technique of wire removal was pioneered by Industrial Light and Magic, when they used it in films such as Howard the Duck (1986), Back to the Future Part II (1989), and Hook (1991).
