= Safety harness =

Equipment designed to protect from falling

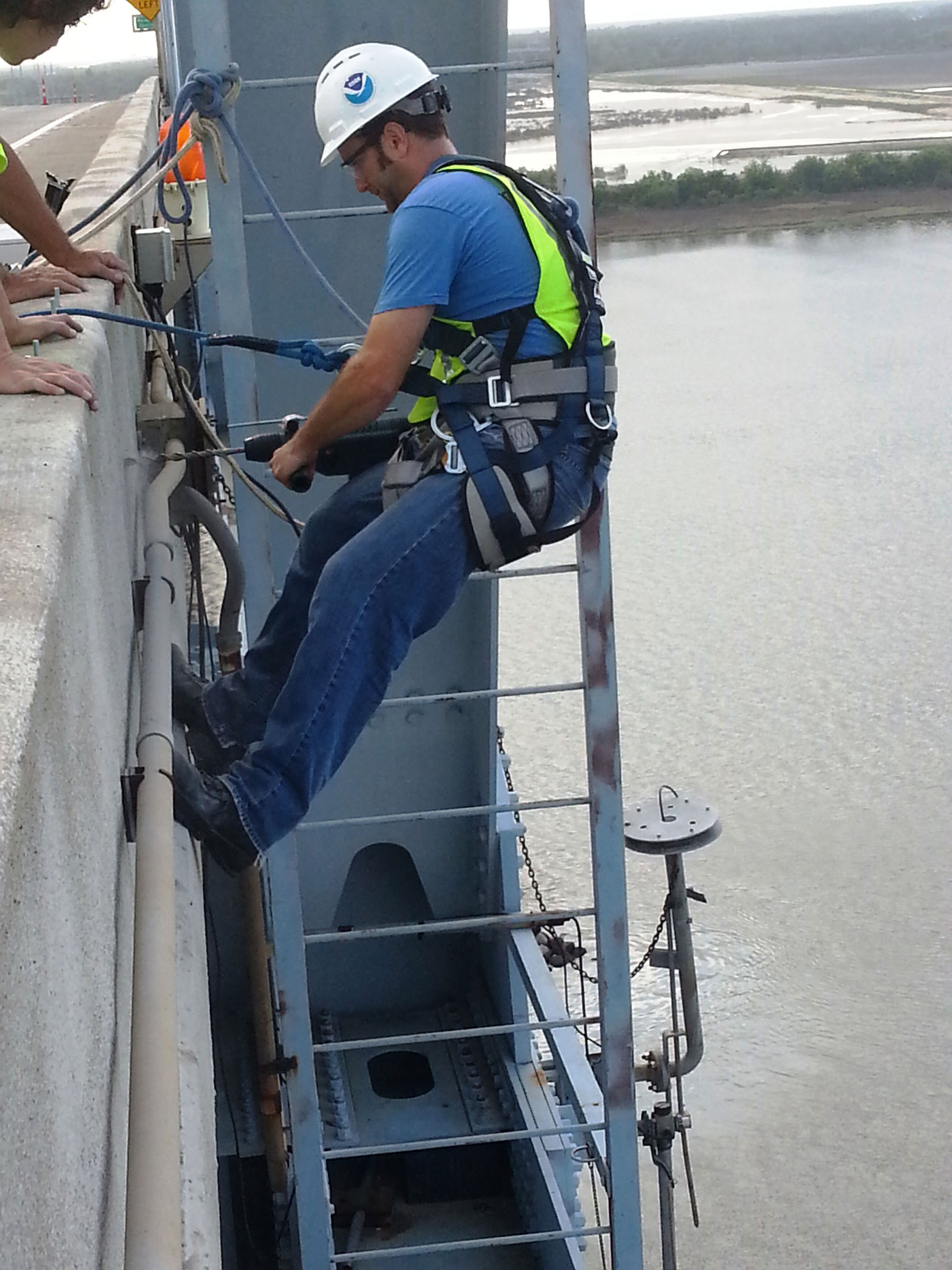
Construction worker wearing a five-point synthetic webbing safety harness, attached at the waist via a lanyard, with a back-up safety line rigged to a loop on the rear of his harness at his shoulders.

A safety harness is a form of protective equipment designed to safeguard the user from injury or death from falling. The core item of a fall arrest system, the harness is usually fabricated from rope, braided wire cable, or synthetic webbing. It is attached securely to a stationary object directly by a locking device or indirectly via a rope, cable, or webbing and one or more locking devices. Some safety harnesses are used in combination with a shock-absorbing lanyard, which is used to regulate deceleration and thereby prevent a serious G-force injury when the end of the rope is reached.

An unrelated use with a materially different arresting mechanism is bungee jumping. Though they share certain similar attributes, a safety harness is not to be confused with a climbing harness used for mountaineering, rock climbing, and climbing gyms. Specialized harnesses for animal rescue or transfer, as from a dock to a vessel, are also made.

Safety harnesses have restraints that prevent the wearer from falling from a height. By wearing the belt or harness the risk of injury from a fall is greatly reduced. The harness allows the user to attach themselves to an object that is stationary, ensuring they will not hit the ground in the event of a possible fall. Falling from high areas is one of the most common causes of injuries in the workplace, so it is very important to make sure you are properly equipped when working up high.

Before safety harnesses were required by OSHA (The Occupational Safety and Health Administration), workers wore body belts to connect to fall protection systems. Workers had the belts fastened around the waist, resulting in the entire force being exerted on the abdomen and often causing significant injury.

OSHA implementing this requirement really made sure the amount of casualties decreased from falling, as well as injuries caused from the old belts they used to wear. Safety harnesses are essential while working in high areas to prevent significant injury or death, and OSHA making these a requirement made everyone understand the importance of safety-harnesses

== Standards ==
In North America, safety harnesses designed for protection against falls from heights in industrial and construction activities are covered by performance standards issued by the American National Standards Institute (ANSI) in the United States and by CSA Group (formerly known as the Canadian Standards Association) in Canada. Specifically, the standards issued are ANSI Z359.1, and CSA Z259.10. These standards are updated approximately every four to five years. The main purpose of the safety standards is to "act as a standard to drive best-in-class harnesses through rigorous design and test requirements. in addition to having requirements for manufacturers to create an ANSI-approved full body harness." The update to Z359.11 includes revisions and new requirements, including A modified, headfirst, dynamic test procedure, New stretch-out requirements for frontal connections, Alternative fall arrest indicator testing and new label requirements, Allowance for harnesses with integrated energy absorbers, and Changes to labeling requirements. It. requires harness label packs to have pictograms showing the approved usage of different connections and diagrams explaining the difference between deployed and non-deployed visual load indicators. These new standards help give the user a level a confidence, while knowing it has gone through rigorous testing to ensure that what you are using is completely safe and effective.

== Design and components ==
A modern safety harness comprises several key components designed to distribute fall forces and ensure safety:

- D-Rings: Attachment points typically located at the back (dorsal), front (sternal), or sides of the harness, used to connect lanyards, lifelines, or other fall arrest devices.
- Straps and Buckles: Made from high-strength synthetic materials, these adjustable elements secure the harness to the user's body to secure a snug fit.
- Padding: Added to areas like the shoulders, legs, and waist to add comfort during prolonged use.
- Visual Indicators: Features that deploy or change appearance when the harness has been involved in a fall, signaling the need for inspection or replacement.
- Labels and Markings: Provide critical information such as size, model, date of manufacture, and compliance with relevant standards.

== Types of safety harnesses ==
Safety harnesses are designed for specific applications, including:

- Full-Body Harness: Distributes fall forces across the shoulders, thighs, and pelvis; commonly used in fall arrest systems.
- Work Positioning Harness: Allows workers to be supported in a specific position, enabling hands-free work at height.
- Suspension Harness: Designed for tasks that require the user to be suspended for extended periods, such as window washing or rescue operations.
- Rescue Harness: Equipped with additional features to facilitate the safe retrieval of individuals from confined spaces or hazardous environments.
- Climbing Harness: Used in recreational activities like rock climbing or bouldering; differs in design and is not typically suitable for industrial fall protection.

== Classifications ==
There are four classes of fall protection systems:

- Class 1 is body belts (single or double D-ring), designed to restrain a person in a hazardous work position, prevent a fall, or arrest it completely within 3 feet (90 cm) (OSHA).
- Class 2 is chest harnesses, used only with limited fall hazards (including no vertical free fall), or for retrieving persons, as from a tank or bin.
- Class 3 is full body harnesses, designed to arrest the most severe free falls.
- Class 4 is suspension belts, independent supports used to suspend a worker, such as boatswain's chairs or raising or lowering harnesses.

== Other types ==
Other forms of safety harnesses include seat belts and child safety seats in cars, which are helping passengers be and feel more safe in a car, Over-the-shoulder restraints, which are mainly used on roller coaster at amusement parks, a seat with a full-body harness like ones used by fighter pilots and racing car drivers, as well as diving harnesses, which are used in surface supplied diving by professional divers.

== Uses ==
=== Fall arrest ===
A video on the importance of fall protection in occupational settings

A fall arrest harness is the equipment that safely stops a person already falling.

A window cleaner who works up high on buildings needs to use a harness to keep from falling many stories if they slip. That is the most common safety harness. A theatrical fly crew member will need a harness because they are up above the theater floor and need to be safe in case they slip as well. Construction workers need a harness if they are working on higher floors because without the harness, they could fall to the ground. Crane operators are at heights that will cause great injury or death if they were to fall off, so they need something to ensure their safety as they are working. A lineman climbs up to power lines and needs to be secured in place so they can work on the high-voltage lines without moving around. Harnesses are used when sailing to prevent the crew from being thrown overboard in case the seas are rough.

=== Climbing ===
A climbing harness is a device which allows a climber access to the safety of a rope.

Rock climbers use harnesses to belay each other, this is when they use a rope to connect to one another so if the climber falls they can catch them with the rope instead of falling all the way to the ground.

=== Guide or support ===
A jackstay harness is a substantial line between two points used to guide or support.

Bungee jumping requires a harness to get the person to bounce back up, without it there would be no way to prevent the jumper from falling straight to the ground. In motorsport harnesses keep the driver secure in the event of a crash, keeping the driver secured in place gives the person more of a chance to leave without injury.

=== Diving ===
A lifeline harness is a rope connecting the diver to an attendant, usually at the surface.

A professional diver would use a safety harness to keep close to something they are working on underwater, without the harness they could be pulled away from their work by a current.

=== Aerial stunts ===
Harnesses are used in aerial stunts to hoist actors into the air to simulate flying (sometimes even in stage plays such as Peter Pan) or impact from punches. Stunt riggers are in charge of setting up the rigging of such stunts. In this case, the harnesses are typically worn underneath the actor's costume to conceal it. When used in the filming of a movie, the wires or ropes used to hoist the actors are usually digitally removed in post-production.

== Inspection ==
Proper inspection of a safety harness is essential for checking if the device remains in safe working condition and compliant with regulatory standards. Harnesses should be inspected before each use (pre-use inspection) and periodically through a formal inspection process, typically every six months, or more frequently depending on usage and environmental exposure.

=== Pre-use inspection ===
Before each use, the user must visually and physically inspect the harness for signs of wear, damage, or degradation. Key inspection points include:

- Webbing: Check for frays, cuts, burns, broken fibers, and chemical damage.
- Stitching: Look for loose, broken, or pulled stitches, especially around attachment points.
- Hardware: Inspect D-rings, buckles, and adjusters for deformation, corrosion, sharp edges, or cracks.
- Labels: Ensure all labels are legible and securely attached, including the date of manufacture and any inspection records.

=== Formal periodic inspection ===
A competent person, as defined by OSHA or relevant regional authority, should conduct formal inspections. These are typically recorded and dated on a safety tag or checklist, and often required at intervals ranging from 3 to 12 months. Factors such as frequency of use, jobsite conditions, and manufacturer recommendations influence the inspection schedule.

=== Storage and maintenance ===
Improper storage can lead to premature wear and damage. Safety harnesses should be stored in a clean, dry, and cool environment, away from direct sunlight, chemicals, or sharp objects. Exposure to UV light, excessive heat, oil, or solvents can degrade the harness materials and compromise safety.

=== Disposal criteria ===
Harnesses must be removed from service immediately if:

- They have been involved in a fall arrest.
- Any damage is detected that could affect performance.
- The manufacturer’s expiration or service life limit has been reached.
- Labels or inspection records are missing or illegible.

It is strongly advised to follow manufacturer-specific inspection guidelines in addition to general safety standards. Failure to properly inspect and maintain a harness can lead to catastrophic failure during use.

== See also ==
- Fall arrest system
- Personal protective equipment
- Occupational safety and health
- Climbing harness
