= Fall arrest =

Equipment which safely stops a person already falling

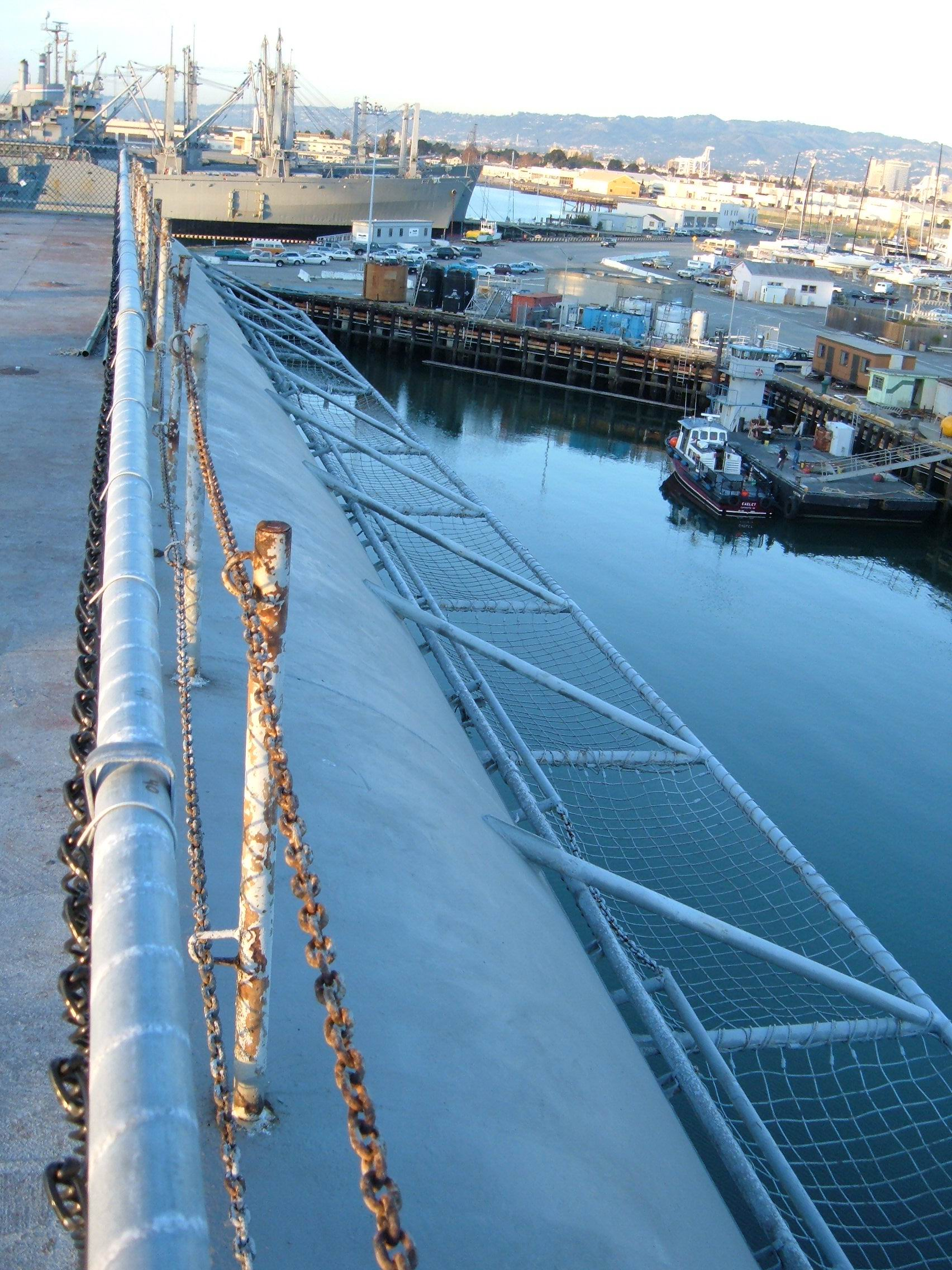
Safety net

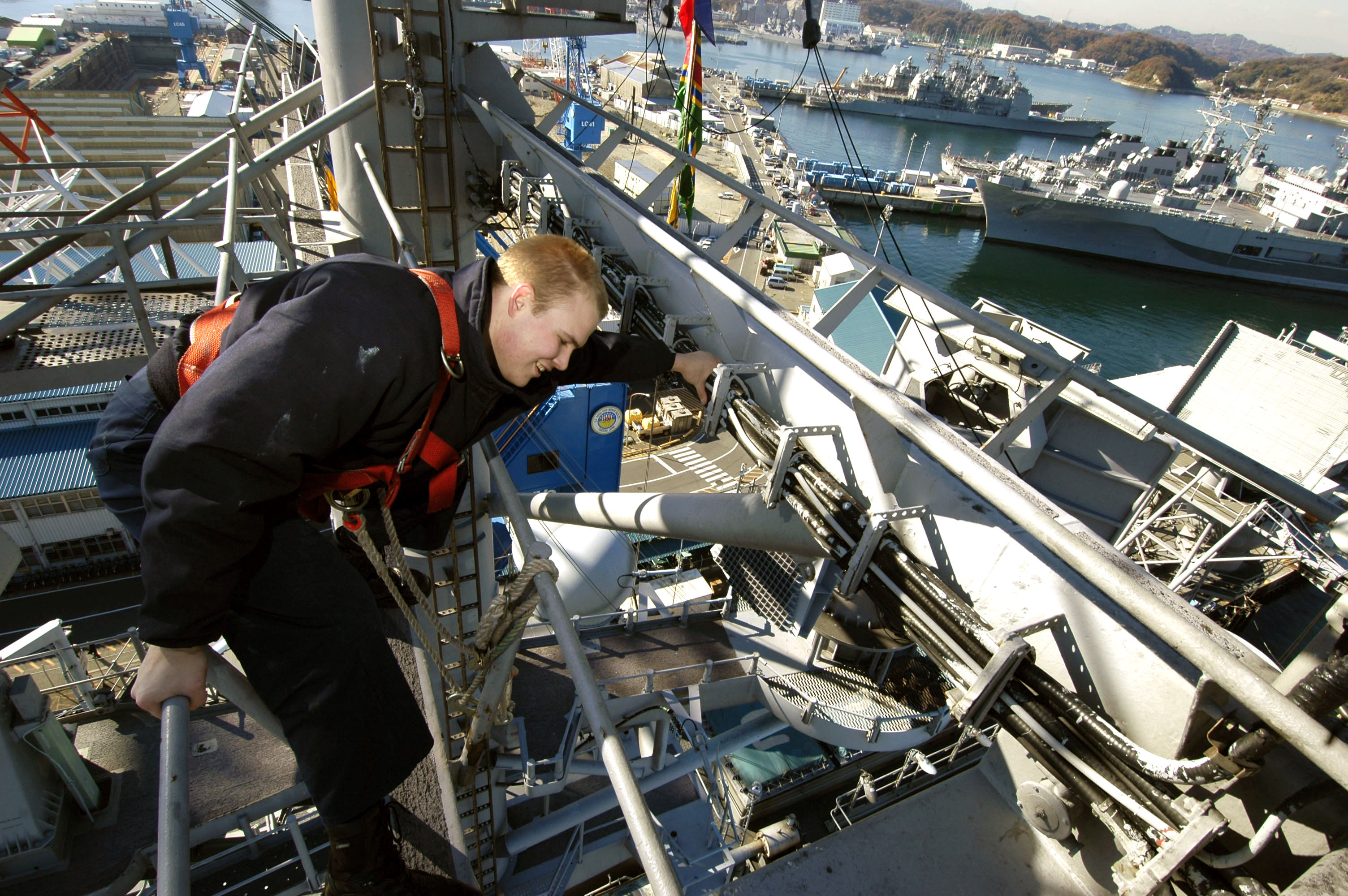
Safety line

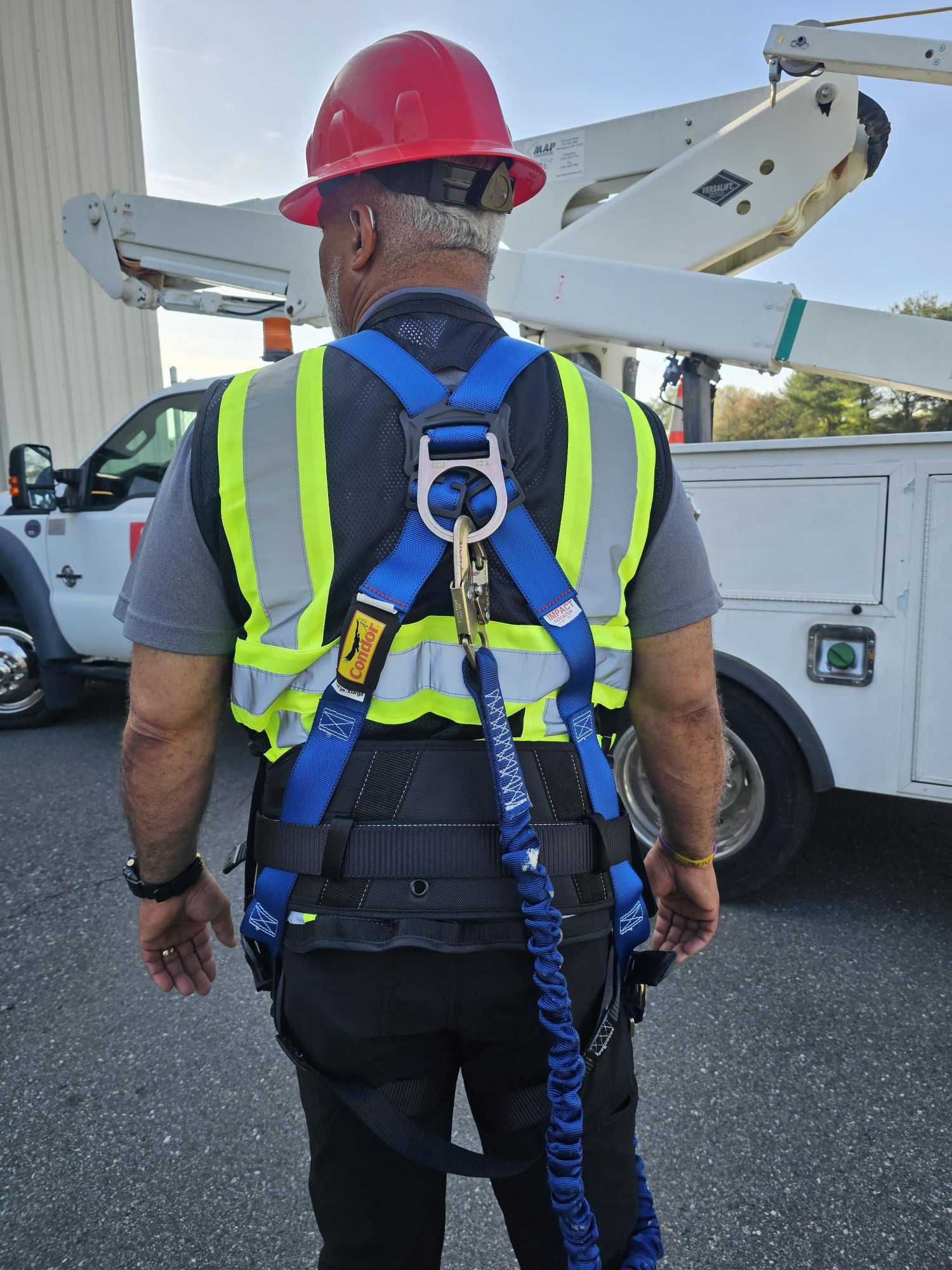
Safety harness

Fall arrest is the form of fall protection which involves the safe stopping of a person already falling. It is one of several forms of fall protection, forms which also include fall guarding (general protection that prevents persons from entering a fall hazard area e.g., guard rails) and fall restraint (personal protection which prevents persons who are in a fall hazard area from falling in the first place, e.g., fall restraint lanyards).

The U.S. Department of Labor's Occupational Safety and Health Administration specifies under Title 29 of the Code of Federal Regulations that individuals working at height must be protected from fall injury, and fall arrest is one of several forms of fall protection as defined within that Code. The employer is required to provide fall protection when a construction worker is performing job duties at six feet or more above a lower level.

== Personal fall arrest system ==
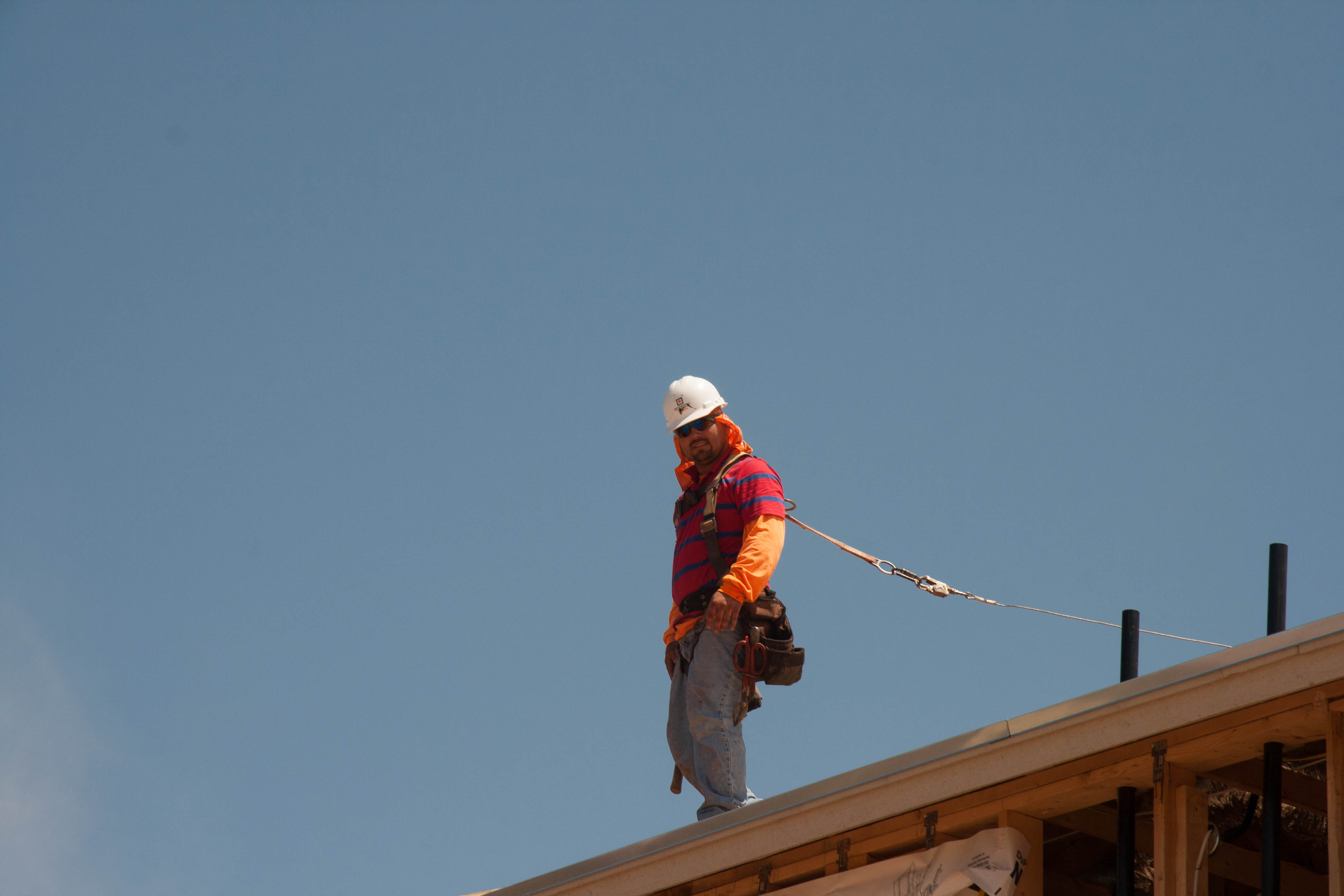
Worker using a fall arrest system

Fall arrest is of two major types: general fall arrest, such as nets; and personal fall arrest, such as lifelines. The most common manifestation of fall arrest in the workplace is the personal fall arrest system (PFAS or lifeline).

Such a system should include 5 elements referred to as ABCDEs of Fall Arrest:

A – Anchorage
a fixed structure or structural adaptation, often including an anchorage connector, to which the other components of the PFAS are rigged.
B – Body harness
a full body harness worn by the worker. The worker is able to secure straps to disperse the force of fall arrest.
C – Connector
a subsystem component connecting the harness to the anchorage – such as a lanyard.
D – Deceleration device
an essential subsystem component designed to dissipate the forces associated with a fall arrest event.
E – Emergency plan & equipment
a clear and simple approach to rescue of a suspended worker following a fall arrest event. All workers should be familiar with the site-specific plan and able to both comply with and implement it. This includes aiding others, as in recovery of a suspended co-worker before "suspension trauma" sets in.

Each of these elements is critical to the effectiveness of a personal fall arrest system. There are many different combinations of products that are commonly used to assemble a personal fall arrest system, and each must meet strict standards. The specific environment or application generally dictates the combination or combinations that are most appropriate.

== Fall protection training ==
Workers are required to have training in the use of fall protection equipment if they will be exposed to fall hazards. This is legislated by occupational health and safety authorities such as OSHA in the USA, and in Canada, the provincial legislative bodies. Training is required by a competent person to include instruction on theoretical aspects of using the equipment, and also practical aspects. Typically a fall protection, sometimes called fall arrest class is 8 hours long for general workers, but may include a second 8 hours of training for workers who climb communication towers, or oil derricks. Fall protection training includes information on the use, maintenance, inspection and hazards of using fall protection equipment.

== Energy absorption ==
To arrest a fall in a controlled manner, it is essential for there to be sufficient energy absorption capacity in the system. Without this designed energy absorption, the fall can only be arrested by applying large forces to the worker and to the anchorage, which can result in either or both being severely affected.

An analogy for this energy absorption is to consider the difference in dropping an egg onto a stone floor or dropping it into soft mud. Even for the same fall distance and weight of egg (the input energy), there will be more damage with the stone floor as the arrest distance is smaller and so forces must be higher to dissipate the energy. For the soft mud, the arrest distance is longer and so arrest forces are lower but the egg is still stopped and is hopefully undamaged.

Because fall arrest designs require high-rate-energy capacity design methods, fundamental fall arrest design is tedious and esoteric. Thus, most fall arrest parts and systems are designed to the force standards contained in federal OSHA 29CFR1910.66 appendix C, a force-type design standard which accounts for required energy considerations. The standard mitigates PPE interchangeability problems, allows wide use by designers not versed in high-rate energy methods, and it limits the force into the worker to a survivable level.

Actual loads on the user and anchor-anchorage vary widely with user weight, height of fall, geometry, and type of line/rope. Excessive energy into the support and user is avoided by the use of energy absorbing PPE designed for the 1800 lbs maximum of the referenced federal OSHA standard. (Designers should be cautioned that the force values of the standard are based on high rate energy system design and thus its force values are not necessarily inter-related.)

The most common fall arrest system is the vertical lifeline: a stranded rope that is connected to an anchor above, and to which the user's PPE is attached either directly or through a "shock absorbing" (energy absorbing) lanyard. Once all of the components of the particular lifeline system meet the requirements of the standard, the anchor connection is then referred to as an anchorage, and the system as well as the rope is then called a "lifeline".

Anchors used for lifeline anchorages are designed for 5,000 lb (2,300 kg) force per connecting user, and the standard permits an anchor to deform in order to absorb energy (adhesive anchors have higher design requirements because of aging loss).

The rope can be lifeline rope, which stretches to lengthen the fall distance as it absorbs energy; or static rope, which does not stretch and thus limits the fall distance, but requires the fall energy be absorbed in other devices. It is essential that the PPE be rated for fall arrest and PPE used with static line include an energy absorber. While the energy absorbing lanyards hold in excess of 5,000 lb (2,300 kg) when fully absorbed, most limit the load during the fall to under 1,400 lb (640 kg).

Another common system is an HLL (horizontal lifeline). These are linear anchoring devices, which allow workers to move along the whole length of the anchor, usually without needing to disconnect and fixing points of the anchorage.

It is normally essential to include energy (or shock) absorbers within HLL in addition to those within the workers' PPE. Without such absorbers, the horizontal life line cannot deform significantly when arresting the fall. Because of the geometry of pulling across the horizontal line, this in turn results in large resolved forces being generated within the anchor system, sufficient to cause failure of the anchorage. This can occur even with energy absorbers being included in the PPE of the worker.

The load and horizontal line geometry in horizontal lifelines usually creates falls in excess of the 6 ft (1.8 m) limit of the standard, limiting HLL design to standard-defined "qualified persons". (The recognition of these basic weaknesses have resulted in most temporary "wrapped structure" HLL anchors, which were anchors made from a wire rope wrapped around a structure and its ends fastened together by wire rope clips, being replaced by fixed-point anchors or HLL systems designed by defined "qualified" persons.)

== Fall clearance ==
In arresting a fall in a controlled manner, the distance required to arrest the fall must be considered. Federal OSHA limits the fall distance to 6 ft (1.8 m) unless the specific system is designed by a qualified person. The user also may not fall so as to strike protrusions or adjoining walls during the 6 ft (1.8 m) fall.

== Design of HLL systems ==
The design of an horizontal lifeline (HLL) system is a complex process. A qualified person must supervise the design, installation, and use of the HLL system.The designer should always perform a design calculation and the results of this calculation should be presented in any proposal and verified as acceptable. The loads applied to the structure and the fall clearance required should be checked.

== Written fall protection plans ==
All of the information needed to implement a fall safety program should be incorporated into a written fall protection plan. The plan must be developed and implemented for each work area where employees are assigned and where fall hazard exist. Each employee must be trained in the policies and procedures outlined in the fall protection plan. The plan shall be kept on site and readily available to all employees. The qualified person is responsible for keeping the plan updated and approving any changes.

An effective approach used to eliminate work hazards is the hierarchy of fall protection. If the fall hazard can be eliminated, it is the most effective approach. The least effective is implementing a fall hazard notification or warning system.

The roles and responsibilities of each employee must be clearly defined, and documentation of employee training is maintained.

== See also ==
- Personal protective equipment
- Safety harness
