= Business routes of Interstate 55 =

Interstate 55 Business

Location
- Country: United States

Highway system
- Interstate Highway System; Main; Auxiliary; Suffixed; Business; Future

Interstate business routes are roads connecting a central or commercial district of a city or town with an Interstate bypass. These roads typically follow along local streets often along a former U.S. Route or state highway that had been replaced by an Interstate. Interstate business route reassurance markers are signed as either loops or spurs using a green shield shaped sign and numbered like the shield of the parent Interstate highway.

Along Interstate 55 (I-55), there are a total of six business routes, three in both Missouri and Illinois, all which are business loops.

== Missouri ==
=== New Madrid business loop ===
Interstate 55 Business
- Location: New Madrid County, MO
- Length: 5.7 mi (9.2 km)

Interstate 55 Business (I-55 Bus.) is a 5.7-mile-long (9.2 km) business loop in New Madrid County, Missouri, that is a major arterial surface street that serves downtown New Madrid, Missouri. It runs north from I-55 at exit 44 in New Madrid through downtown New Madrid to I-55 at exit 49 (north of New Madrid). The entire route runs concurrently with U.S. Route 61/U.S. Route 61 (Great River Road).

Major intersections
The entire route is in New Madrid County.

| Location | mi | km | Destinations | Notes |
|---|---|---|---|---|
| New Madrid | 0.0 | 0.0 | US 61 south (Blues Hwy) / US 62 west / Great River Road south – Howardville, Lilbourn, Marston, Risco | Continuation south |
| New Madrid | 0.0 | 0.0 | I-55 north – I-55 BL I-55 south – Marston, Memphis | Southern end of US 61/US 62 concurrency; southern terminus; I-55 exit 44 |
| New Madrid | 2.3 | 3.7 | US 61 Bus. east (Scott St) | |
| New Madrid | 3.1 | 5.0 | Route U east (Dawson Rd) Route U west – Lilbourn | |
| | 5.7 | 9.2 | I-55 north – Route P, Cape Girardeau, St. Louis I-55 south – I-55 BL | Northern end of US 61/ US 62 concurrency; northern terminus; I-55 exit 49 |
| | 5.7 | 9.2 | US 61 north / US 62 east / Great River Road north – Matthews, Sikeston, East Prairie | Continuation north |
1.000 mi = 1.609 km; 1.000 km = 0.621 mi: Concurrency terminus

=== Cape Girardeau business loop ===
Interstate 55 Business
- Location: Cape Girardeau–Fruitland, MO

Interstate 55 Business (I-55 Bus.) begins at US 61/Route 74 in Cape Girardeau at exit 93 and ends at US 61 at exit 105 in Fruitland. It also crosses its parent Interstate at exit 99

=== Crystal City business loop ===
Interstate 55 Business
- Location: Crystal City–Herculaneum, MO

Interstate 55 Business (I-55 Bus.) spans from US 67/US 61 at exit 174 in Crystal City to McNutt Street at exit 178 in Herculaneum.

== Illinois ==
=== Springfield business loop ===
Interstate 55 Business
- Location: Springfield–Sherman, IL
- Length: 13.9 mi (22.4 km)

Interstate 55 Business (I-55 Bus.) is to a major arterial surface street that serves downtown Springfield, Illinois. It runs north from the intersection of I-55 and I-72 through downtown to Illinois Route 4 (IL 4, Veterans' Parkway). It then runs northeast to Sherman.

All of I-55 Bus. was part of US 66 at some point.

Major intersections
The entire route is in Sangamon County.

| Location | mi | km | Destinations | Notes |
|---|---|---|---|---|
| Springfield | 0.0– 0.7 | 0.0– 1.1 | I-55 / I-72 / US 36 – Jacksonville, Decatur, Chicago, St. Louis | Exit 92A on I-55, exit 97B on I-72 |
| Springfield | 4.9 | 7.9 | IL 97 north (Jefferson Street) | |
| Springfield | 5.0 | 8.0 | IL 97 south (Madison Street) | |
| Springfield | 7.0 | 11.3 | IL 29 (Sangamon Avenue) | Southern end of IL 29 concurrency |
| Springfield | 8.0 | 12.9 | IL 4 south / IL 29 north (Veterans Parkway) – Abraham Lincoln Capital Airport | Northern end of IL 29 concurrency, northern terminus of IL 4 |
| Sherman | 12.1 | 19.5 | IL 124 west (Andrew Road) – Andrew, Athens | Eastern terminus of IL 124 |
| Sherman | 12.7 | 20.4 | I-55 south – Springfield, East St. Louis | No access to I-55 northbound; exit 105 on I-55 |
| Sherman | 13.9 | 22.4 | I-55 north – Chicago | Only access to I-55 northbound |
1.000 mi = 1.609 km; 1.000 km = 0.621 mi: Concurrency terminus; Incomplete access

=== Lincoln business loop ===
Interstate 55 Business
- Location: Lincoln, IL
- Length: 8.9 mi (14.3 km)

Interstate 55 Business (I-55 Bus.) serves the downtown of Lincoln, Illinois.

Major intersections
The entire route is in Logan County.

| Location | mi | km | Destinations | Notes |
|---|---|---|---|---|
| Broadwell Township | 0.0 | 0.0 | I-55 south – St. Louis | Southern terminus, I-55 exit 123 |
| Lincoln | 3.4 | 5.5 | Historic US 66 | |
| Lincoln | 5.0 | 8.0 | IL 10 west / IL 121 west – Mason City | Western end of IL 10/IL 121 concurrency |
| Lincoln | 5.2 | 8.4 | IL 10 east / IL 121 east – Clinton, Decatur | Eastern end of IL 10/IL 121 concurrency |
| Lincoln | 7.1 | 11.4 | Airport Road – Logan County Airport | |
| Lincoln | 7.5 | 12.1 | Historic US 66 | |
| East Lincoln Township | 8.9 | 14.3 | I-55 north – Chicago | Northern terminus, I-55 exit 133 |
1.000 mi = 1.609 km; 1.000 km = 0.621 mi: Concurrency terminus

=== Bloomington–Normal business loop ===
Interstate 55 Business
- Location: McLean County, Illinois

Interstate 55 Business (I-55 Bus.) in Bloomington–Normal is known for its entire length as Veterans Parkway. It is a divided, limited-access highway bypassing the Bloomington–Normal area to the south and east. The route's north–south portion largely passes through a retail core, including Eastland Mall and The Shoppes at College Hills. The highway is also the recommended route from I-39, I-55, and I-74 to Central Illinois Regional Airport via IL 9.

Major intersections

The entire route is in McLean County.

| Location | mi | km | Destinations | Notes |
|---|---|---|---|---|
| Bloomington | 0.0 | 0.0 | I-55 south – Springfield I-74 east / US 51 south – Champaign, Decatur I-55 north / I-74 west / US 51 north – Joliet, Peoria, Rockford | Exit 157 on I-55; exit 134 on westbound I-74 |
| Bloomington | | | Historic US 66 west (Hamilton Road) | |
| Bloomington | | | US 51 Bus. / Historic US 66 east (Main Street) | Interchange |
| Bloomington | | | US 150 (Morrissey Drive) | |
| Bloomington | | | IL 9 (Empire Street) – Pekin, Gibson City | Central Illinois Regional Airport |
| Normal | | | Historic US 66 (Shelbourne Drive) – Normal | Southbound exit only |
| Normal | | | I-55 – Joliet, Springfield | I-55 exit 167; road continues as Pipeline Road |
1.000 mi = 1.609 km; 1.000 km = 0.621 mi: Concurrency terminus; Incomplete access
