= Tornado outbreak of November 15, 2005 =

Tornado outbreak in US

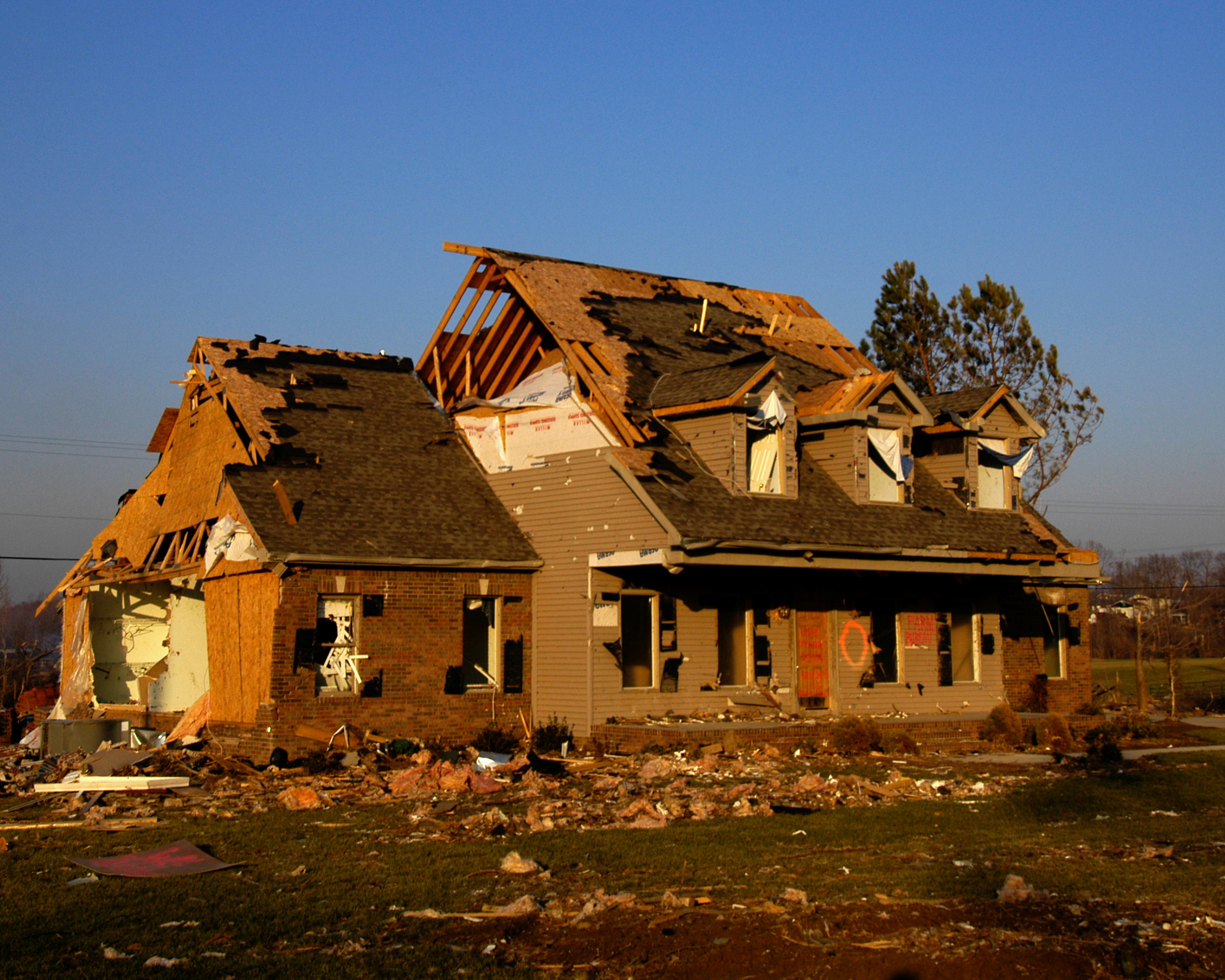
- A house destroyed by an F4 tornado in Kentucky

Meteorological history
- Duration: November 15, 2005

Tornado outbreak
- Tornadoes: 49 confirmed
- Max. rating: F4 tornado
- Duration: 6 hours, 5 minutes

Overall effects
- Fatalities: 1
- Injuries: 108
- Damage: $68 million
- Areas affected: Midwestern United States, Tennessee River Valley
- Part of the tornado outbreaks of 2005

A destructive tornado outbreak impacted the Midwestern United States and Tennessee River Valley on November 15, 2005. It occurred along a cold front separating warm, humid air from the southeast from cold Arctic air to the north and northwest. 49 tornadoes were confirmed in the central United States in the states of Alabama, Arkansas, Illinois, Indiana, Kentucky, Missouri and Tennessee over that afternoon and evening. Strong winds and large hail caused additional damage throughout the region.

The strongest tornado was an F4 tornado on the Fujita scale; it occurred in the vicinity of Earlington and Madisonville, Kentucky. It was also the only violent tornado documented in 2005.

== Meteorological synopsis ==
The Storm Prediction Center of the National Weather Service in Norman, Oklahoma had issued a "high risk" for severe weather over an area from northern Mississippi to central Indiana. Such a declaration is unusual (particularly for November) and means that there is a significant threat for severe thunderstorms with widespread tornadic activity. When the first tornado watches of the afternoon were issued, the SPC had declared a Particularly Dangerous Situation (PDS) for destructive tornadoes in several of the tornado watches, a highly unusual alert which notifies that frequent and dangerous tornadoes are possible, and by late that evening, no less than 49 tornadoes (including ten strong tornadoes and one violent tornado) were confirmed, and several more unconfirmed tornadoes were reported (and later confirmed as microbursts). Fortunately, the tornadoes were centered over more rural areas and damage was scattered but severe over many communities. There were numerous injuries, but remarkably, only one person was killed. The low casualty toll was likely due to the fact the outbreak was well-predicted and primarily occurred in the afternoon when people are most aware of the situation.

This was the third major tornado outbreak of November 2005, the other two being in Evansville, Indiana on November 6 (killing 25 people) and in much of Iowa on November 12 (killing one person). There was another major outbreak in the same general area on November 27 and 28, killing two people.

== Confirmed tornadoes ==
Confirmed tornadoes by Fujita rating
FU	F0	F1	F2	F3	F4	F5	Total
0	21	17	7	3	1	0	49

List of confirmed tornadoes – Tuesday, November 15, 2005
F#	Location	County	Time (UTC)	Path length	Damage
Missouri
F0	E of Matthews	New Madrid	1837	0.2 mile	The first tornado of the outbreak was confirmed by the local sheriff, and no damage was reported.
F0	NNW of East Prairie to NW of Whiting	Mississippi	1844	0.2 mile	Tornado sighted and reported by a local radio station. No damage was reported.
F0	WSW of Lilbourn	New Madrid	2044	0.2 mile	An old equipment shed was destroyed, and a couple of power lines were downed near that shed. A large, partially rotten tree was snapped off about halfway up.
F1	SW of Lilbourn to North Lilbourn	New Madrid	2055	1 mile (1.6 km)	Moderate damage occurred on the western side of Lilbourn. A couple of mobile homes were pushed several feet off of their foundations. Several projectiles were embedded into one of the mobile homes. A considerable amount of debris was stuck in the trees in the area. Numerous trees were either sheared off or blown down. A minivan was turned slightly, and a couple of small outbuildings were damaged or destroyed. Near the end of the tornado track in North Lilbourne, a couple of farm trailers and a couple of empty semi trailers were overturned. Two people were injured.
Illinois
F0	Eastern Norris City	White	1910	0.2 mile	Brief tornado occurred near a reservoir and caused no damage.
F0	NW of Metropolis	Massac	1934	0.1 mile (200 m)	A weak, short-lived tornado was reported crossing the Ohio River just east of the Kentucky state line. No damage was observed.
F1	NW of Omega to SSE of Farina	Marion	2035	5 miles	Much of the path was through Stephen A. Forbes State Park, where extensive tree damage occurred. Some machine sheds, outbuildings, and a 32-foot travel trailer were all destroyed. Three farms were also damaged, and one house lost its entire roof.
F1	W of Bogota to Newton to Sam Parr State Park	Jasper	2115	10 miles (16 km)	Tornado downed numerous trees and power lines as it moved directly through Newton. The majority of the structural damage impacted outbuildings, barns, and grain bins. Eleven outbuildings were severely damaged or destroyed. Three houses sustained minor damage. One attached garage was destroyed, and the debris was carried 150 yards downwind.
F0	S of Harco	Saline	2132	0.2 mile	Brief touchdown. No damage was reported.
Tennessee
F1	W of Eaton to Dyer	Crockett, Gibson	1920	15 miles (24 km)	In Crockett County, one house was shifted off its foundation, and others sustained shingle damage; in Dyer, the tornado damaged 25 houses as well as several businesses. Mobile homes and some utility sheds were also damaged in multiple locations.
F1	N of Rutherford to Sidonia	Weakley	1955	2 miles	One house was significantly damaged. Two mobile homes and several other houses were damaged to a lesser extent. Many trees were blown down or uprooted as well.
F2	Palestine to Paris to NE of Buchanan	Henry	2035	20 miles (32 km)	A strong tornado destroyed several manufacturing facilities and about 30 houses, with another 70 houses sustaining damage of some degree. The Henry County emergency management center took a direct hit from the tornado and was forced to relocate. The tornado briefly displayed a twin funnel and injured 13 people.
F1	ENE of Vale	Benton	2135	1 mile (1.6 km)	A house lost part of its roof.
F2	N of Camden	Benton	2138	1.2 miles	A house had its roof torn off.
F2	S of Tennessee Ridge	Houston	2204	0.5 mile (800 m)	A modular home was destroyed, and other houses were damaged.
F0	SE of Erin (1st tornado)	Houston	2210	0.2 mile	Trees were snapped along Bateman Branch Road.
F1	SE of Erin (2nd tornado)	Houston	2210	0.3 mile	Metal sheds and outbuildings sustained roof damage.
F1	Shiloh	Montgomery	2235	0.2 mile	A mobile home was overturned and destroyed.
F1	SW of Cunningham	Montgomery	2236	0.2 mile	A mobile home was damaged, and the roof was blown off of a market.
F0	N of Cunningham	Montgomery	2237	0.1 mile (200 m)	Damage was limited to trees.
F2	S of Clarksville	Montgomery	2244	1 mile (1.6 km)	A well-built brick house had its roof torn off, and large trees were snapped.
F0	NE of Holladay	Benton	2250	0.1 mile (200 m)	Trees were snapped.
F1	S of New Johnsonville	Humphreys	2255	2 miles	A mobile home and a house were destroyed, and several other houses sustained roof damage. One barn also lost its roof.
F2	N of Sylvia	Dickson	2333	1 mile (1.6 km)	Multiple houses sustained extensive damage.
F0	N of Charlotte	Dickson	2340	0.1 mile (200 m)	Damage was limited to trees.
F2	N of Collinwood	Wayne	0002	6 miles (10 km)	This strong tornado snapped numerous large trees and damaged multiple houses, nearly destroying one of them. Two trailer homes were pushed off their foundations, and a barn was destroyed. One person was injured.
F0	E of Pleasant View	Robertson	0005	0.1 mile (200 m)	Trees were snapped and large branches were downed.
F0	NW of Nashville	Davidson	0015	0.1 mile (200 m)	Utility poles were broken near Whites Creek Pike.
F0	SW of Burwood (1st tornado)	Maury	0025	0.1 mile (200 m)	Brief tornado with no damage.
F0	SW of Burwood (2nd tornado)	Williamson	0032	0.1 mile (200 m)	Brief tornado with no damage.
F0	SE of Hendersonville	Sumner	0042	0.1 mile (200 m)	Several trees were blown down.
Kentucky
F0	Rossington	McCracken	1930	0.2 mile	Brief tornado with no damage.
F3	S of Mayfield to Benton to SW of Princeton	Graves, Calloway, Marshall, Lyon	1945	44 miles (70 km)	1 death – This strong, long-tracked tornado began near Mayfield, downing trees and damaging garages and outbuildings. In Calloway County, additional tree and outbuilding damage occurred. In Marshall County, the tornado reached F3 intensity as it passed just south of Benton. The tornado then crossed the Kentucky Lake and devastated the Hillman Ferry Campground where 115 RVs were destroyed, along with a dock and several boats, Nineteen houses were destroyed, 36 others sustained major damage, and 65 more received minor damage. A man was killed when his mobile home was thrown 40 feet. The tornado damaged several more houses at F2 intensity near Lake Barkley before dissipating. This tornado was on the ground for 65 minutes, and about 20 people were injured.
F0	SE of Princeton	Caldwell	2101	0.2 mile	Several trees were downed.
F4	Earlington to Southeastern Madisonville to W of Sacramento	Hopkins	2127	15 miles (24 km)	Violent multi-vortex tornado first struck Earlington where houses were leveled, trees were "reduced to nubs," and the ground was reportedly scoured to bare soil. Windspeeds were estimated at 220 miles per hour here. A steel beam was carried through the air and found wedged against trees and other debris. Damage also occurred along the east side of Madisonville. A total of 151 houses and buildings were destroyed, 67 others sustained major damage, and 303 more showed minor damage. At least 40 people were injured. This was the only violent tornado that occurred in the United States in 2005.
F1	ENE of Calhoun	McLean	2204	0.2 mile	The front porch of a house was blown off, and an outbuilding behind it was moved slightly.
F0	N of Utica	Daviess	2212	0.2 mile	Brief tornado touched down over an open field with no damage.
F1	NW of Adairville to S of Middleton	Logan	2315	8.4 miles	Many homes, trailers, barns, and outbuildings were damaged.
F2	NNE of Turnertown	Simpson	2352	1 mile (1.6 km)	Tornado damaged trailers and downed many trees.
F1	Woodburn	Warren	0007	1 mile (1.6 km)	Tornado struck the north side of town. Three businesses, six houses, and numerous barns and outbuildings were damaged. Initially thought to have been straight-line winds.
Arkansas
F0	SW of Pine Bluff	Jefferson	2020	0.7 mile (1.1 km)	A number of trees were snapped off along the path of the tornado, and one house sustained chimney damage.
F1	NNE of Gillett to SSE of Ethel	Arkansas	2052	16.5 miles (27 km)	Tornado destroyed a barn and an outbuilding, and damaged several others. A few houses had shingles torn off, and hundreds of trees were knocked down or broken off. A few power poles were also knocked down.
F1	Hyden	Arkansas	2055	3.5 miles (5.5 km)	The tornado blew down some trees and damaged the roofs of several barns.
Indiana
F3	NE of Washington to Burns City	Daviess, Martin	2040	12 miles (20 km)	In Daviess County, the K&K Industries plant was destroyed, trapping several employees. A total of 123 houses and 20 businesses in the county were damaged or destroyed. In Martin County, F1 intensity damage occurred. 31 people were injured.
F1	S of Coveyville	Lawrence	2125	0.2 mile	Brief tornado damaged two houses. This tornado came from the same supercell that spawned the F3 tornado in Daviess and Martin Counties.
F3	NW of Old St Louis	Bartholomew, Shelby	2219	10 miles (23 km)	A large hog farm was severely damaged, and an old farmhouse was blown off its foundation. At least 25 properties were damaged in this largely rural area, with six declared total losses. One person was injured. This tornado came from the same supercell that produced the previous F1 and F3 tornadoes.
F1	WNW of Friendly Corner to SW of Van Buren	Grant	0010	3 miles (5 km)	A house sustained roof damage, several trees and power lines were downed, and grain elevator augers were overturned. The tornado crossed Interstate 69, which resulted in a “semi truck” being blown off the highway.
Alabama
F0	Vernon	Lamar	0030	0.1 mile (200 m)	Tornado partially tore the roof off a building supply company and slightly damaged a few other adjacent smaller buildings in town.
F0	NE of Crane Hill	Cullman	0230	0.3 mile	A service station received moderate roof damage and had its awning partially torn off. Numerous trees were snapped and twisted in this vicinity. A house sustained shingle damage and had a window blown out. Extensive power line damage occurred, and a pump house was destroyed as well.
Sources: NOAA storm data, Paducah office, Memphis office, Little Rock office, Lincoln office, Louisville office, St. Louis office, Nashville office, Northern Indiana office, WCDQ Radio news, WSMB

== See also ==
- Weather of 2005
- List of North American tornadoes and tornado outbreaks
- List of F4 and EF4 tornadoes
  - List of F4 and EF4 tornadoes (2000–2009)
