= Interstate 55 in Missouri =

Section of Interstate Highway in Missouri, United States

Interstate 55
- I-55 highlighted in red

Route information
- Maintained by MoDOT
- Length: 210.45 mi (338.69 km)
- Existed: 1956–present
- NHS: Entire route

Major junctions
- South end: I-55 at the Arkansas state line near Blytheville, AR
- I-155 / US 412 near Hayti; I-57 / US 60 in Sikeston; US 62 in Sikeston; I-255 / I-270 in Mehlville; US 50 / US 61 / US 67 in Mehlville; I-44 in St. Louis; I-44 / I-64 / US 40 in St. Louis
- North end: I-55 / I-64 / US 40 at the Illinois state line in St. Louis

Location
- Country: United States
- State: Missouri
- Counties: Pemiscot, New Madrid, Scott, Cape Girardeau, Perry, Ste. Genevieve, Jefferson, St. Louis, City of St. Louis

Highway system
- Interstate Highway System; Main; Auxiliary; Suffixed; Business; Future; Missouri State Highway System; Interstate; US; State; Supplemental
← US 54	→ US 56

Interstate 55 (I-55) in the US state of Missouri runs from the Arkansas state line to the Poplar Street Bridge over the Mississippi River in St. Louis.

== Route description ==
I-55 enters Missouri at the Arkansas border near Cooter. It runs northward through mostly flat land in the Bootheel, where it has an interchange with U.S. Route 412 (US 412) and I-155. The highway continues over bumpy land through or near the towns of Hayti, Portageville, and New Madrid before reaching an interchange with US 60 and I-57 just south of Sikeston. The next interchange, US 62, provides access into the city of Sikeston and one of its most popular attractions, Lambert's Cafe, the "Home of the Throwed Rolls".

North of Sikeston, I-55 begins to traverse rolling terrain on its way to Cape Girardeau. Exit 95, Route 74 east, provides direct access to the Bill Emerson Memorial Bridge into southern Illinois. The heart of the city of Cape Girardeau as well as Southeast Missouri State University can be reached by taking either exit 96 or exit 99.

I-55 then goes through rural areas again as it makes a north-northwesterly run through the towns of Perryville and Ste. Genevieve before entering the southern reaches of the St. Louis metro area at the interchange with US 67 and the Twin Cities of Festus and Crystal City. US 61 and US 67 run concurrently immediately east of I-55 nearly due north through the Jefferson County towns of Herculaneum, Pevely (where the Interstate expands from four lanes to six), Barnhart (and then to eight), Imperial, and finally Arnold before crossing the Meramec River into St. Louis County.

From Richardson Road in Arnold to I-270, I-55 is 10 lanes wide. The Interstate narrows back down to eight lanes past I-270, through southern St. Louis County, and into the city of St. Louis. In the last few miles of I-55 in the state of Missouri, there is an interchange and brief overlap with I-44 before reaching the Poplar Street Bridge crossing into Illinois.

== History ==
=== Sponsorship controversy ===
The white supremacy group Ku Klux Klan began fighting several court battles with the state of Missouri after the state disputed its right to sponsor a stretch of freeway in Saint Louis County and Jefferson County, near St. Louis. In March 2001, after a US District Court judge found that blocking the Klan's sponsorship was unconstitutional, the Court of Appeals ruled that the state must erect signs announcing the group's sponsorship. However, the Missouri General Assembly later voted to rename the stretch of I-55 the "Rosa Parks Freeway" in honor of the Montgomery civil rights hero who began the Montgomery bus boycott. When asked how she felt about this honor, she is reported to have commented, "It is always nice to be thought of." The Klan were eventually dropped from the scheme on April 4, 2001, on the grounds that, for the duration of their sponsorship, they had not once cleaned the freeway.

== Exit list ==
County	Location	mi	km	Exit	Destinations	Notes
Pemiscot		0.000	0.000		I-55 south – Memphis	Continuation into Arkansas
Pemiscot		1.132	1.822	1	Route O to US 61 – Holland	
Pemiscot		4.487	7.221	4	Route E – Cooter, Holland	
Pemiscot		7.977	12.838	8	US 61 south / Route 164 / Great River Road – Steele, Cottonwood Point	Southern end of US 61 and Great River Road concurrency
Pemiscot		14.483	23.308	14	Route U / Route H / Route J – Caruthersville, Braggadocio	
Pemiscot		17.644	28.395	17	I-155 east / US 412 – Caruthersville, Dyersburg, Hayti, Kennett	Signed as exits 17A (east) and 17B (west); I-155/US 412 exits 1A-B
Pemiscot	Hayti	19.074	30.697	19	Route 84 – Hayti, Caruthersville	
Pemiscot		27.607	44.429	27	Route K / Route A / Route BB – Wardell, Homestown	
New Madrid	Portageville	32.905	52.955	32	US 61 north / Route 162 / Great River Road – Portageville, Gideon	Northern end of US 61 and Great River Road concurrency
New Madrid	Marston	40.984	65.957	40	Route EE (St. Jude Road) – Marston	
New Madrid	New Madrid	44.913	72.280	44	I-55 BL north / US 61 / US 62 – New Madrid, Howardville	
New Madrid		49.637	79.883	49	I-55 BL south / US 61 / US 62 – New Madrid, Kewanee	
New Madrid		52.165	83.951	52	Route P – Kewanee, Bernie	
New Madrid		58.221	93.698	58	Route 80 – Matthews, East Prairie	
Scott	Sikeston	66.177	106.502	66	I-57 north / US 60 – Dexter, Poplar Bluff, Chicago	Signed as exits 66A (north/east) and 66B (west); current southern terminus and exits 1A-B on I-57
Scott	Sikeston	67.486	108.608	67	US 62 – Sikeston, Bertrand	
Scott	Sikeston	69.379	111.655	69	Route HH – Miner, Sikeston	
Scott		80.956	130.286	80	Route 77 – Benton, Diehlstadt	
Scott	Kelso	87	140	87	Route PP – Kelso, Commerce	Opened in 2019
Scott	Scott City	89.717	144.386	89	US 61 south / Route M / Route K / Great River Road – Scott City, Chaffee	Southern end of US 61 and Great River Road concurrency
Scott	Scott City	91.811	147.755	91	Route AB – Cape Girardeau Regional Airport	
Cape Girardeau	Cape Girardeau	93.504	150.480	93	I-55 BL north / US 61 north / Route 74 west / Great River Road – Dutchtown, Cape Girardeau	Northern end of US 61 and Great River Road concurrency; southern end of Route 74 concurrency; signed as exits 93A (west) and 93B (north) northbound
Cape Girardeau	Cape Girardeau	95.245	153.282	95	Route 74 east to IL 146 – Cape Girardeau	Northern end of Route 74 concurrency
Cape Girardeau	Cape Girardeau	96.463	155.242	96	Route K – Cape Girardeau, Gordonville	
Cape Girardeau	Cape Girardeau	99.859	160.707	99	I-55 BL / US 61 / Route 34 – Cape Girardeau, Jackson	
Cape Girardeau		102.304	164.642	102	East Main Street, LaSalle Avenue	
Cape Girardeau		105.758	170.201	105	I-55 BL south / US 61 – Fruitland, Jackson	
Cape Girardeau		111.292	179.107	111	Route E – Oak Ridge, Pocahontas	
Cape Girardeau		118.049	189.981	117	Route KK – Old Appleton, Arnsberg	
Perry		124.037	199.618	123	Route B – Biehle	
Perry	Perryville	129.869	209.004	129	Route 51 – Perryville, Marble Hill	
Perry		135.589	218.209	135	Route M – Brewer	
Ste. Genevieve		141.212	227.259	141	Route Z – St. Mary	
Ste. Genevieve		143.816	231.449	143	Route N / Route J / Route M – Ozora	
Ste. Genevieve		150.411	242.063	150	Route 32 / Route B / Route A – Ste. Genevieve, Farmington	
Ste. Genevieve		154.984	249.423	154	Route O – Ste. Genevieve, Rocky Ridge	
Ste. Genevieve		157.785	253.930	157	Route Y – Bloomsdale	
Ste. Genevieve		162.123	260.912	162	Route DD / Route OO	
Jefferson		165.263	265.965	165	Route TT	Southbound exit and northbound entrance
Jefferson		171.087	275.338	170	US 61 – Selma	
Jefferson	Crystal City	174.470	280.782	174	I-55 BL north / US 67 to US 61 – Crystal City, Farmington, Bonne Terre	Signed as exits 174A (north) and 174B (south); Full cloverleaf interchange to be converted into partial cloverleaf interchange by December 2026.
Jefferson	Festus	175.843	282.992	175	Route A – Hillsboro, Festus	
Jefferson	Herculaneum	178.742	287.657	178	I-55 BL south (McNutt Street) – Herculaneum	
Jefferson	Pevely	180.957	291.222	180	Route Z – Pevely	
Jefferson	Barnhart	185.272	298.166	185	Route M – Barnhart, Antonia	
Jefferson	Imperial	186.892	300.774	186	Imperial Main Street	
Jefferson	Arnold	190.188	306.078	190	Richardson Road	Signed as Richardson Road/Vogel Road southbound
Jefferson	Arnold	192.087	309.134	191	Route 141 – Arnold, Fenton	
St. Louis		193.475	311.368	193	Meramec Bottom Road	
St. Louis		195.409	314.480	195	Butler Hill Road	
St. Louis		196.947	316.955	196	I-255 east – Chicago I-270 west – Kansas City	Southbound exit is via exit 197; I-255/270 exits 1A-B; access to St. Louis Lambert International Airport
St. Louis		197.519	317.876	197	US 61 / US 67 / US 50 (Lindbergh Boulevard)	
St. Louis		199.583	321.198	199	Reavis Barracks Road	
St. Louis		200.309	322.366	200	Union Road	Southbound exit and northbound entrance
St. Louis		201.122	323.674	201A	Bayless Avenue	
City of St. Louis		201.761	324.703	201B	Weber Road	Southbound exit and northbound entrance
City of St. Louis		202.229	325.456	202A	Carondelet Boulevard, River City Boulevard	Northbound exit and southbound entrance
City of St. Louis		202.305	325.578	202B	Germania Avenue	Southbound exit and northbound entrance
City of St. Louis		202.990	326.681	202C	Loughborough Avenue	
City of St. Louis		203.877	328.108	203	Virginia Avenue, Bates Street	
City of St. Louis		204.894	329.745	204	4500 South Broadway	
City of St. Louis		205.526	330.762	205	Gasconade Street	Southbound exit and northbound entrance
City of St. Louis		206.346	332.082	206A	Potomac Street	Northbound exit and southbound entrance
City of St. Louis		206.597	332.486	206B	3200 South Broadway	Northbound exit and southbound entrance
City of St. Louis		206.952	333.057	206C	Arsenal Street	
City of St. Louis		207.803	334.427	207A	Historic US 66 / Route 30 east (Gravois Avenue)	Northbound exit and southbound entrance
City of St. Louis		207.836	334.480	207B	Truman Parkway	Northbound exit and southbound entrance
City of St. Louis		207.982	334.715	207B	I-44 west – Tulsa	Southern end of I-44 concurrency; exit no. not signed southbound; I-44 exit 290A
City of St. Louis		208.040	334.808	290A	Historic US 66 / Route 30 (Gravois Avenue / 12th Street)	Southbound exit and northbound entrance
City of St. Louis		208.614	335.732	290C	Park Avenue / 7th Street	Exit number corresponds to I-44
City of St. Louis		209.190	336.659		I-44 east to I-70 west – Kansas City, Walnut Street	Northern end of I-44 concurrency; I-44 exit 291A; northbound exit and southbound entrance; access to St. Louis Lambert International Airport
City of St. Louis		209.315	336.860		I-64 west / US 40 west – St. Louis	Southern end of I-64/US 40 concurrency; I-64 exit 40B; southbound exit and northbound entrance
Mississippi River		209.689	337.462	Poplar Street Bridge; Missouri–Illinois state line		
Mississippi River		209.689	337.462		I-55 north / I-64 east / US 40 east to I-70 east – Illinois	Continuation into Illinois
1.000 mi = 1.609 km; 1.000 km = 0.621 mi: Concurrency terminus; Incomplete access

== Auxiliary routes ==
- I-155: A spur running from I-55 in Hayti, Missouri, to US 51 in Dyersburg, Tennessee; overlaps with US 412 for its entire length. Eight miles (13 km) of this highway will be absorbed into the newly extended I-69 in the future.
- I-255: The eastern third of the beltway around the St. Louis Metro Area (with I-270 forming the remaining two-thirds)
- I-55 BL: I-55 has three business loops in Missouri.

Interstate 55
Previous state: Arkansas	Missouri	Next state: Illinois
