= Canalou, Missouri =

- City
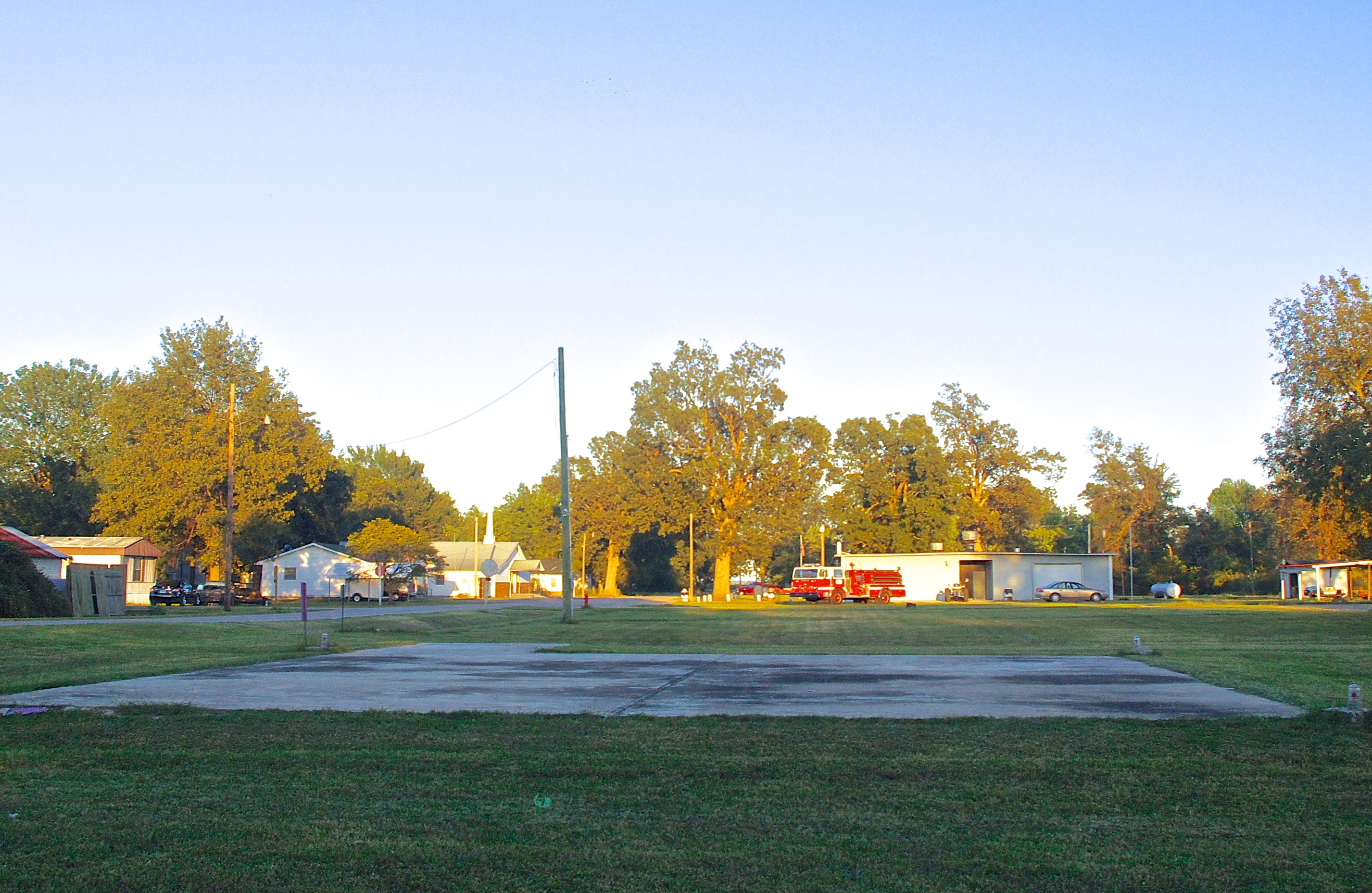
- Canalou

- Location of Canalou, Missouri
- Coordinates: 36°45′14″N 89°41′11″W
- Country: United States
- State: Missouri
- County: New Madrid

Area
  - Total: 0.20 sq mi (0.52 km^{2})
  - Land: 0.20 sq mi (0.52 km^{2})
  - Water: 0 sq mi (0.00 km^{2})
- Elevation: 289 ft (88 m)

Population (2020)
  - Total: 158
  - Density: 784.1/sq mi (302.75/km^{2})
- Time zone: UTC-6 (Central (CST))
  - Summer (DST): UTC-5 (CDT)
- ZIP code: 63828
- Area code: 573
- FIPS code: 29-11026
- GNIS feature ID: 2393727

Canalou is a city in New Madrid County, Missouri, United States. The population was 158 at the 2020 census. The ZIP code is 63828.

== History ==
Canalou had its start in 1902 as a lumber company town. A post office called Canalou has been in operation since 1903. It is unknown why the name "Canalou" was applied to this community.

== Geography ==
Canalou is located in northwest New Madrid County approximately one mile from the Stoddard County line. It is on Missouri Route H three miles west of Matthews. Sikeston is nine miles to the northeast.

According to the United States Census Bureau, the city has a total area of 0.20 square miles (0.52 km^{2}), all land.

== Demographics ==
Historical population
Census	Pop.	Note	%±
1910	296		—
1920	477		61.1%
1930	359		−24.7%
1940	419		16.7%
1950	438		4.5%
1960	447		2.1%
1970	358		−19.9%
1980	369		3.1%
1990	319		−13.6%
2000	348		9.1%
2010	338		−2.9%
2020	158		−53.3%
U.S. Decennial Census

=== 2010 census ===
As of the census of 2010, there were 338 people, 114 households, and 77 families living in the city. The population density was 1,690.0 inhabitants per square mile (652.5/km^{2}). There were 121 housing units at an average density of 605.0 per square mile (233.6/km^{2}). The racial makeup of the city was 96.15% White, 1.18% Black or African American, 0.89% Native American, and 1.78% from two or more races. Hispanic or Latino of any race were 0.59% of the population.

There were 114 households, of which 47.4% had children under the age of 18 living with them, 49.1% were married couples living together, 14.0% had a female householder with no husband present, 4.4% had a male householder with no wife present, and 32.5% were non-families. 22.8% of all households were made up of individuals, and 10.5% had someone living alone who was 65 years of age or older. The average household size was 2.96 and the average family size was 3.52.

The median age in the city was 32 years. 31.4% of residents were under the age of 18; 9.6% were between the ages of 18 and 24; 29% were from 25 to 44; 21.8% were from 45 to 64; and 8% were 65 years of age or older. The gender makeup of the city was 51.2% male and 48.8% female.

=== 2000 census ===
As of the census of 2000, there were 348 people, 125 households, and 91 families living in the city. The population density was 1,380.1 inhabitants per square mile (532.9/km^{2}). There were 140 housing units at an average density of 555.2 per square mile (214.4/km^{2}). The racial makeup of the city was 95.11% White, 3.74% African American, 0.29% Asian, and 0.86% from two or more races.

There were 125 households, out of which 40.8% had children under the age of 18 living with them, 54.4% were married couples living together, 14.4% had a female householder with no husband present, and 26.4% were non-families. 21.6% of all households were made up of individuals, and 12.0% had someone living alone who was 65 years of age or older. The average household size was 2.78 and the average family size was 3.24.

In the city, the population was spread out, with 33.3% under the age of 18, 6.9% from 18 to 24, 28.2% from 25 to 44, 21.8% from 45 to 64, and 9.8% who were 65 years of age or older. The median age was 32 years. For every 100 females there were 89.1 males. For every 100 females age 18 and over, there were 87.1 males.

The median income for a household in the city was $21,250, and the median income for a family was $25,417. Males had a median income of $24,792 versus $14,464 for females. The per capita income for the city was $9,660. About 20.0% of families and 27.4% of the population were below the poverty line, including 37.5% of those under age 18 and 39.4% of those age 65 or over.

== Media ==
The Public Radio International documentary show This American Life aired a half-hour segment featuring Canalou, titled "You Can't Go Home Again," as part of its April 9, 1999 "Do-Gooders" episode.

== Education ==
It is in the New Madrid County R-I School District. Central High School is the district's comprehensive high school.

Three Rivers College's service area includes New Madrid County.

== Notable people ==
- Eddie Lee Jackson, Illinois state representative, born in Canalou
- Michael Parkes (artist) was born in Sikeston and grew up in Canalou.
