= Parma, Missouri =

- City
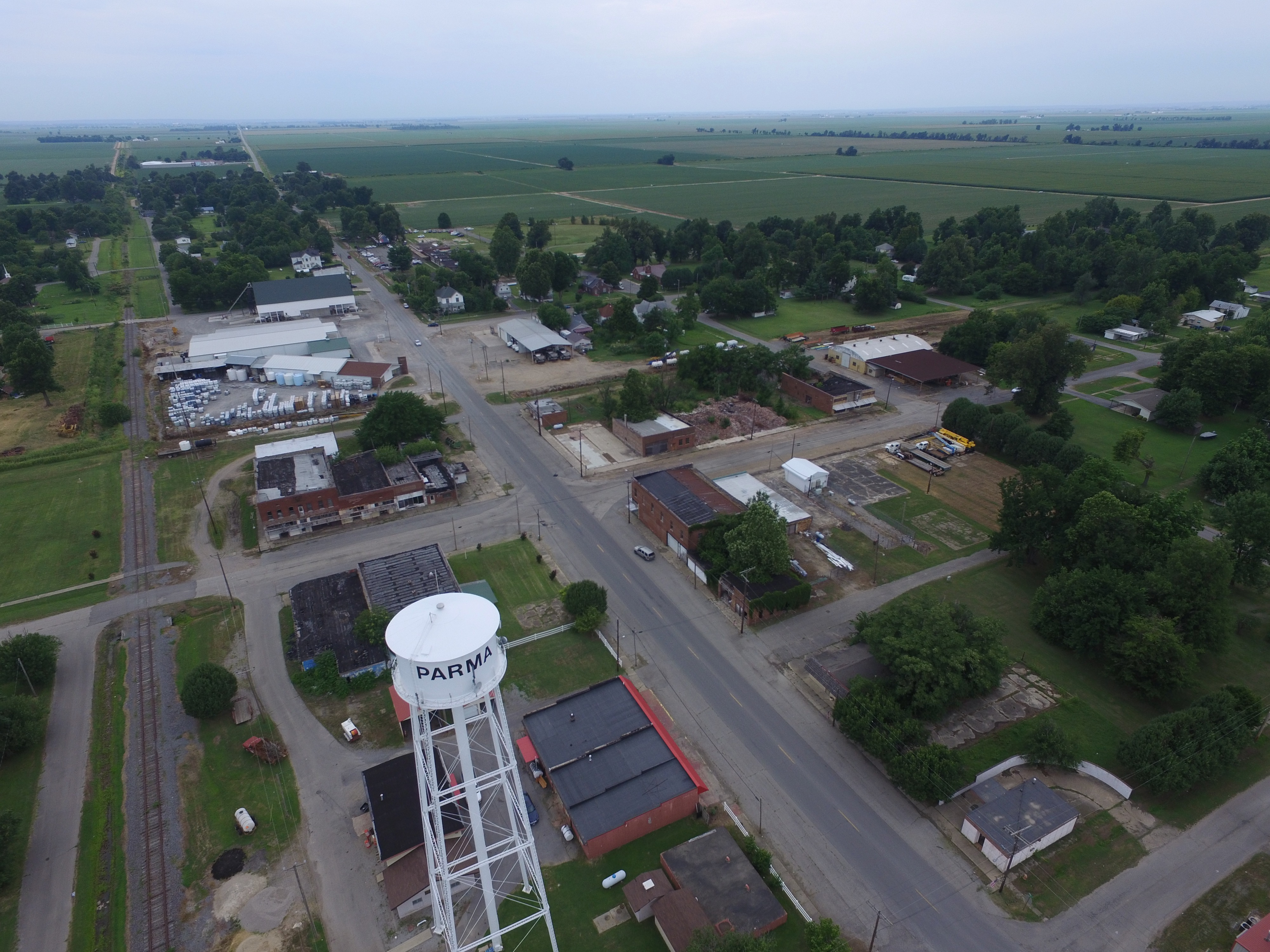
- Downtown Parma in 2016

- Location of Parma, Missouri
- Coordinates: 36°36′48″N 89°49′3″W
- Country: United States
- State: Missouri
- County: New Madrid

Government
  - Mayor: Rufus Williamson, Jr.

Area
  - Total: 0.64 sq mi (1.65 km^{2})
  - Land: 0.64 sq mi (1.65 km^{2})
  - Water: 0 sq mi (0.00 km^{2})
- Elevation: 282 ft (86 m)

Population (2020)
  - Total: 555
  - Density: 869.8/sq mi (335.82/km^{2})
- Time zone: UTC-6 (Central (CST))
  - Summer (DST): UTC-5 (CDT)
- ZIP code: 63870
- Area code: 573
- FIPS code: 29-56342
- GNIS feature ID: 0724048

Parma is a city in New Madrid County, Missouri, United States. The population was 555 at the 2020 census.

== History ==
Parma was first incorporated as a village in 1900.

At the turn of the 20th century, Parma contained two saw mills.

In 1903, Parma, along with the neighboring community of Lotta, was incorporated as a village, retaining the name "Parma."

It became a fourth class city in 1905.

On April 14, 2015, Tyus Byrd was sworn in as the first African-American woman mayor of Parma. Byrd succeeded Randall Ramsey, who had been mayor of Parma for a total of 37 years. Shortly before Byrd was to be sworn in, four of the city's six police officers resigned, along with the city's clerk and the supervisor of water treatment.

In January 2019 the Missouri State Auditor opened an investigation into the city's finances based on a whistle-blower tip. Her initial report indicated serious mismanagement and loss of funds. Her final report showed that official records had been falsified and more than $115,000 had been misappropriated.

In April 2019, Byrd lost her reelection campaign to Rufus Lee Williamson Jr. Within hours of Williamson's swearing in, the city was shocked by arsons burning down Tyus Bird's house and setting fire to the records and other departments at city hall. The city's main computer and numerous financial documents were destroyed.

On November 23, 2020, Tyus Byrd was arrested in Jonesboro, Arkansas on charges of stealing $25,000 or more and forgery, and subsequently charged with two counts of forgery and two counts of receiving stolen property. Two other former employees of the city had also been arrested the former city clerk, Helen Jean Frye, and former city water supervisor David L. Thatch. Helen Frye received a sentence of seven years, 120 days of incarceration and then probation. while Tyus Byrd received a ten-year suspended sentence. David L. Thatch was to stand trial in 2024.

== Geography ==
Parma is located on Missouri Route 153 one mile south of the Stoddard-New Madrid county line. It is 6.5 miles northwest of Malden and 15 miles west of New Madrid.

According to the United States Census Bureau, the city has a total area of 0.69 square miles (1.79 km^{2}), all land.

== Demographics ==
Historical population
Census	Pop.	Note	%±
1910	905		—
1920	1,241		37.1%
1930	1,051		−15.3%
1940	1,187		12.9%
1950	1,163		−2.0%
1960	1,060		−8.9%
1970	1,051		−0.8%
1980	1,081		2.9%
1990	995		−8.0%
2000	852		−14.4%
2010	713		−16.3%
2020	555		−22.2%
U.S. Decennial Census

=== 2010 census ===
As of the census of 2010, there were 713 people, 283 households, and 196 families residing in the city. The population density was 1,033.3 inhabitants per square mile (399.0/km^{2}). There were 342 housing units at an average density of 495.7 per square mile (191.4/km^{2}). The racial makeup of the city was 67.46% White, 29.45% Black or African American, 0.14% Native American, 0.56% Native Hawaiian or Pacific Islander, 1.12% from other races, and 1.26% from two or more races. Hispanic or Latino of any race were 2.81% of the population.

There were 283 households, of which 36.4% had children under the age of 18 living with them, 42.4% were married couples living together, 22.6% had a female householder with no husband present, 4.2% had a male householder with no wife present, and 30.7% were non-families. 25.4% of all households were made up of individuals, and 10.6% had someone living alone who was 65 years of age or older. The average household size was 2.52 and the average family size was 2.97.

The median age in the city was 39.8 years. 26.2% of residents were under the age of 18; 7.8% were between the ages of 18 and 24; 22.5% were from 25 to 44; 28.6% were from 45 to 64; and 15% were 65 years of age or older. The gender makeup of the city was 48.9% male and 51.1% female.

=== 2000 census ===
As of the census of 2000, there were 852 people, 333 households, and 229 families residing in the city. The population density was 1,325.6 inhabitants per square mile (511.8/km^{2}). There were 383 housing units at an average density of 595.9 per square mile (230.1/km^{2}). The racial makeup of the city was 57.39% White, 41.55% African American, 0.12% from other races, and 0.94% from two or more races. Hispanic or Latino of any race were 0.82% of the population.

There were 333 households, out of which 30.6% had children under the age of 18 living with them, 47.4% were married couples living together, 18.6% had a female householder with no husband present, and 31.2% were non-families. 28.5% of all households were made up of individuals, and 14.7% had someone living alone who was 65 years of age or older. The average household size was 2.56 and the average family size was 3.11.

In the city, the population was spread out, with 27.3% under the age of 18, 9.4% from 18 to 24, 25.8% from 25 to 44, 21.0% from 45 to 64, and 16.4% who were 65 years of age or older. The median age was 36 years. For every 100 females there were 85.6 males. For every 100 females age 18 and over, there were 78.4 males.

The median income for a household in the city was $18,804, and the median income for a family was $23,333. Males had a median income of $24,444 versus $15,804 for females. The per capita income for the city was $11,031. About 29.5% of families and 34.1% of the population were below the poverty line, including 53.8% of those under age 18 and 15.0% of those age 65 or over.

== Climate ==
Climate is characterized by relatively long, hot summers and cool winters with evenly distributed precipitation throughout the year. The Köppen Climate Classification subtype for this climate is "Cfa" (Humid Subtropical Climate).

== Education ==
=== Public schools ===
It is in the New Madrid County R-I School District. Students attend New Madrid County Central High School near New Madrid.

=== History ===
After the founding of the community of Parma, rapid growth led to the formation of a school system. From the late 1890s to 1910, various one room structures in the Parma area were utilized for education. The first structure for strictly school purposes was erected in 1910. By 1935, an increasing student population demanded the need for a larger high school building. With 9.9 square feet per pupil, Amendment No. 3 or The School Bond was placed on the ballot. After a summer of strong campaigning from the school district and other community leaders, Amendment No. 3 passed by a vote of 284-29 on October 19, 1935. Construction commenced in the fall of 1936 and the first classes began in the fall of 1937. The original 1933 gymnasium burned in 1944. Once again, the citizens of Parma banded together to fund construction of a new gymnasium which was completed by fall of 1944. The athletic teams, known as the Parma Pirates, were the pride of the school and surrounding community. In 1980, the Parma Consolidated School District No. 5 was consolidated into the New Madrid County Central R-I School District. Over the next several decades, the school complex fell into a state of disrepair.

A major fire in the fall of 2010 brought the entire high school complex to the ground.

=== 2017 Memorial ===
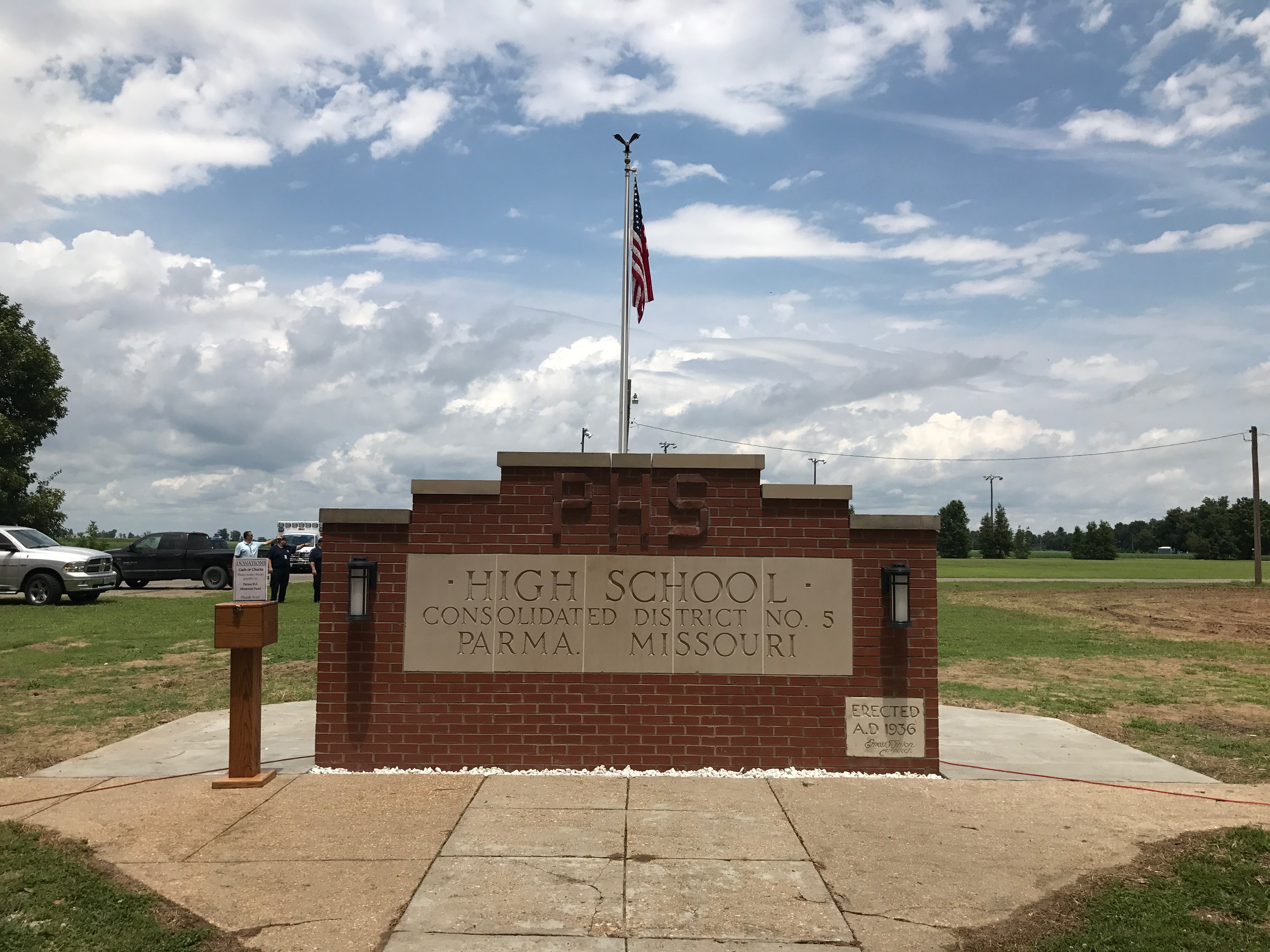
2017 Memorial

In the summer of 2016, several PHS alumni and former community leaders formed the Parma School Memorial Committee. They were successful in their efforts to raise funds to construct a large monument on the grounds of the old high school building. The memorial was dedicated on July 1, 2017.

=== Public library ===
Parma has a lending library, a branch of the New Madrid County Library.

=== Colleges and universities ===
Three Rivers College's service area includes New Madrid County.

== Notable people ==
- Christene Merick, American philanthropist who was born in Parma
