= Howardville, Missouri =

- City
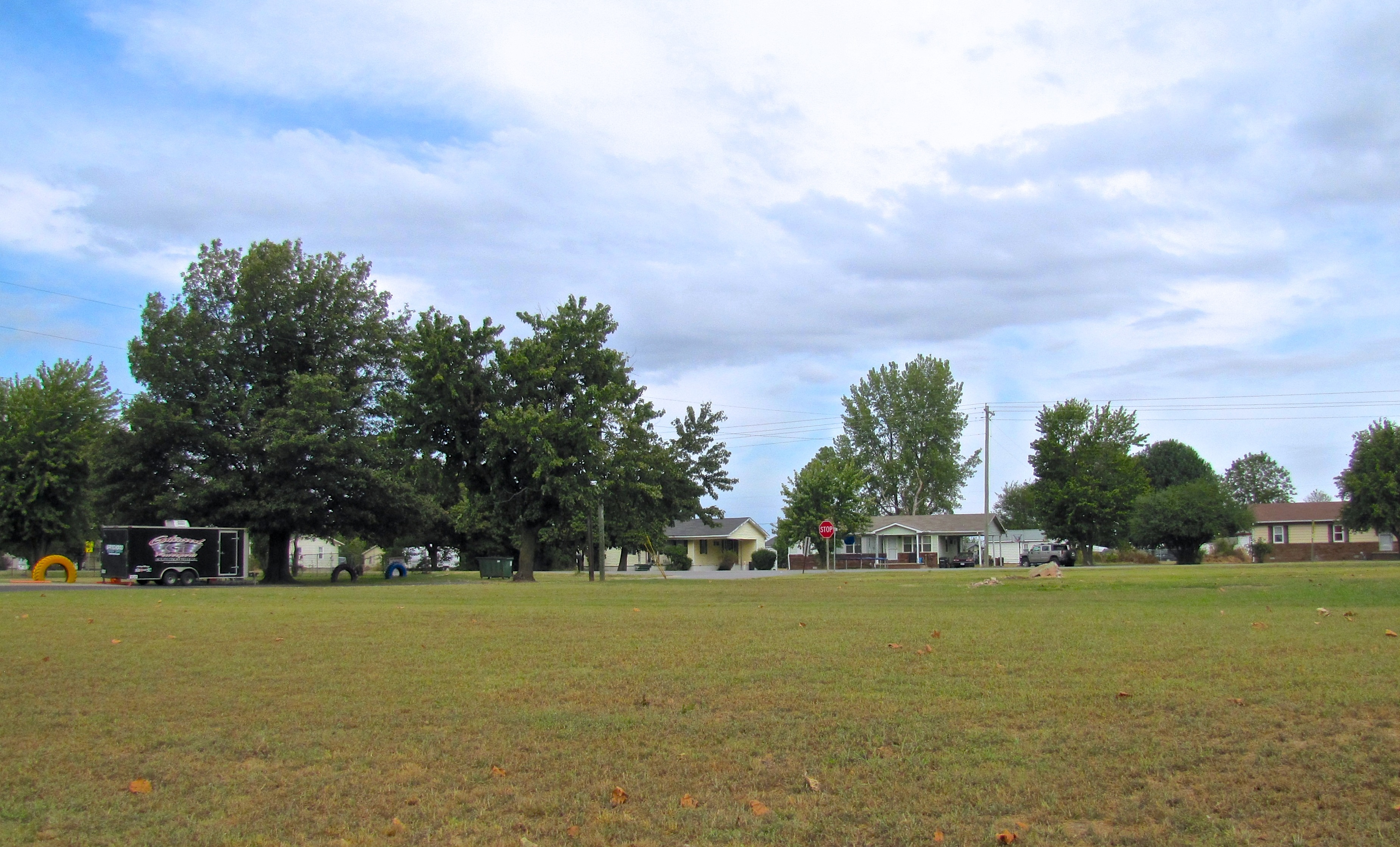
- Howardville
- Nickname: The Bricks
- Location of Howardville, Missouri
- Coordinates: 36°34′06″N 89°35′50″W
- Country: United States
- State: Missouri
- County: New Madrid

Area
  - Total: 0.23 sq mi (0.59 km^{2})
  - Land: 0.23 sq mi (0.59 km^{2})
  - Water: 0 sq mi (0.00 km^{2})
- Elevation: 292 ft (89 m)

Population (2020)
  - Total: 277
  - Density: 1,213.2/sq mi (468.41/km^{2})
- Time zone: UTC-6 (Central (CST))
  - Summer (DST): UTC-5 (CDT)
- ZIP code: 63869
- Area code: 573
- FIPS code: 29-33364
- GNIS feature ID: 2394431

Howardville is a city in New Madrid County, Missouri, United States. The population was 277 at the 2020 census.

== History ==
Howardville was founded by Travis B. Howard, a prominent black educator and activist in the mid-20th century Bootheel region. A graduate of Tuskegee Institute, Howard was inspired by Booker T. Washington's belief that land ownership was among the critical factors in lifting African Americans out of poverty. In the late 1940s, Howard purchased 200 acres (81 ha) of land encompassing much of what is now Howardville, and sold off lots to displaced black sharecroppers. The city incorporated as "Howardville" in 1953.

Howardville High School, initially known as East Lilbourn High School, opened in 1958. After county schools were integrated in the late 1960s, the school operated as a junior high school until 1980. In 2017, the school was nominated for listing on the National Register of Historic Places.

Travis Howard was the father of Major League Baseball player Elston Howard, the first black player to join the New York Yankees.

== Geography ==
Howardville is situated along U.S. Routes 61 and 62, just west of New Madrid and the Mississippi River. The city of Lilbourn lies just to the north along County Road D, and Marston to the south along US 61. New Madrid County Central High School and New Madrid County Central Middle School are located between Howardville and New Madrid.

According to the United States Census Bureau, the city has a total area of 0.23 square miles (0.60 km^{2}), all land.

== Demographics ==
Historical population
Census	Pop.	Note	%±
1960	190		—
1970	500		163.2%
1980	536		7.2%
1990	440		−17.9%
2000	342		−22.3%
2010	383		12.0%
2020	277		−27.7%
U.S. Decennial Census

=== 2020 census ===
Howardville city, Missouri – Racial and ethnic composition Note: the US Census treats Hispanic/Latino as an ethnic category. This table excludes Latinos from the racial categories and assigns them to a separate category. Hispanics/Latinos may be of any race.
Race / Ethnicity (NH = Non-Hispanic)	Pop 2000	Pop 2010	Pop 2020	% 2000	% 2010	% 2020
White alone (NH)	24	22	13	7.02%	5.74%	4.69%
Black or African American alone (NH)	311	352	253	90.94%	91.91%	91.34%
Native American or Alaska Native alone (NH)	0	0	0	0.00%	0.00%	0.00%
Asian alone (NH)	0	4	0	0.00%	1.04%	0.00%
Native Hawaiian or Pacific Islander alone (NH)	0	0	0	0.00%	0.00%	0.00%
Other race alone (NH)	0	0	0	0.00%	0.00%	0.00%
Mixed race or Multiracial (NH)	2	3	10	0.58%	0.78%	3.61%
Hispanic or Latino (any race)	5	2	1	1.46%	0.52%	0.36%
Total	342	383	277	100.00%	100.00%	100.00%

=== 2010 census ===
As of the census of 2010, there were 383 people, 160 households, and 101 families living in the city. The population density was 1,665.2 inhabitants per square mile (642.9/km^{2}). There were 192 housing units at an average density of 834.8 per square mile (322.3/km^{2}). The racial makeup of the city was 5.74% White, 92.43% Black or African American, 1.04% Asian, and 0.78% from two or more races. Hispanic or Latino of any race were 0.52% of the population.

There were 160 households, of which 43.1% had children under the age of 18 living with them, 21.9% were married couples living together, 38.1% had a female householder with no husband present, 3.1% had a male householder with no wife present, and 36.9% were non-families. 35.0% of all households were made up of individuals, and 15% had someone living alone who was 65 years of age or older. The average household size was 2.39 and the average family size was 3.08.

The median age in the city was 29.7 years. 33.9% of residents were under the age of 18; 11% were between the ages of 18 and 24; 22.7% were from 25 to 44; 18.1% were from 45 to 64; and 14.4% were 65 years of age or older. The gender makeup of the city was 41.3% male and 58.7% female.

=== 2000 census ===
As of the census of 2000, there were 342 people, 133 households, and 88 families living in the city. The population density was 1,490.0 inhabitants per square mile (575.3/km^{2}). There were 158 housing units at an average density of 688.4 per square mile (265.8/km^{2}). The racial makeup of the city was 7.02% White, 92.40% African American, and 0.58% from two or more races. Hispanic or Latino of any race were 1.46% of the population.

There were 133 households, out of which 36.1% had children under the age of 18 living with them, 18.8% were married couples living together, 39.8% had a female householder with no husband present, and 33.8% were non-families. 31.6% of all households were made up of individuals, and 15.8% had someone living alone who was 65 years of age or older. The average household size was 2.57 and the average family size was 3.23.

In the city the population was spread out, with 33.9% under the age of 18, 13.2% from 18 to 24, 22.8% from 25 to 44, 17.0% from 45 to 64, and 13.2% who were 65 years of age or older. The median age was 27 years. For every 100 females there were 82.9 males. For every 100 females age 18 and over, there were 69.9 males.

The median income for a household in the city was $9,671, and the median income for a family was $11,389. Males had a median income of $23,750 versus $16,023 for females. The per capita income for the city was $6,588. About 63.0% of families and 58.5% of the population were below the poverty line, including 69.4% of those under age 18 and 73.0% of those age 65 or over.

== Education ==
It is in the New Madrid County R-I School District. Central High School is the district's comprehensive high school.

Three Rivers College's service area includes New Madrid County.
