= Remond Willis =

American gridiron football player (born 1985)

No. 28
- Position: Linebacker

Personal information
- Born: August 28, 1985 (age 41); Lilbourn, Missouri, U.S.
- Listed height: 6 ft 1 in (1.85 m)
- Listed weight: 248 lb (112 kg)

Career information
- High school: New Madrid (MO) County Central
- College: Tennessee State
- NFL draft: 2009: undrafted

Career history
- Calgary Stampeders (2009)*; Milwaukee Iron (2010); Winnipeg Blue Bombers (2010–2011); Saskatchewan Roughriders (2011); Portland Thunder (2015)
- * Offseason or practice squad member only

Career CFL statistics
- Tackles: 22
- Sacks: 1

Career AFL statistics
- Tackles: 4.5
- Sacks: 0.5
- Pass breakups: 1
- Stats at ArenaFan.com

Remond Willis III (born August 28, 1985) is an American former professional football defensive lineman who played in the Canadian Football League (CFL) for the Winnipeg Blue Bombers and Saskatchewan Roughriders. He was signed by the Calgary Stampeders as a free agent in 2009. He played college football for the Tennessee State Tigers and the University of Illinois.
