= Kony Ealy =

American football player (born 1991)

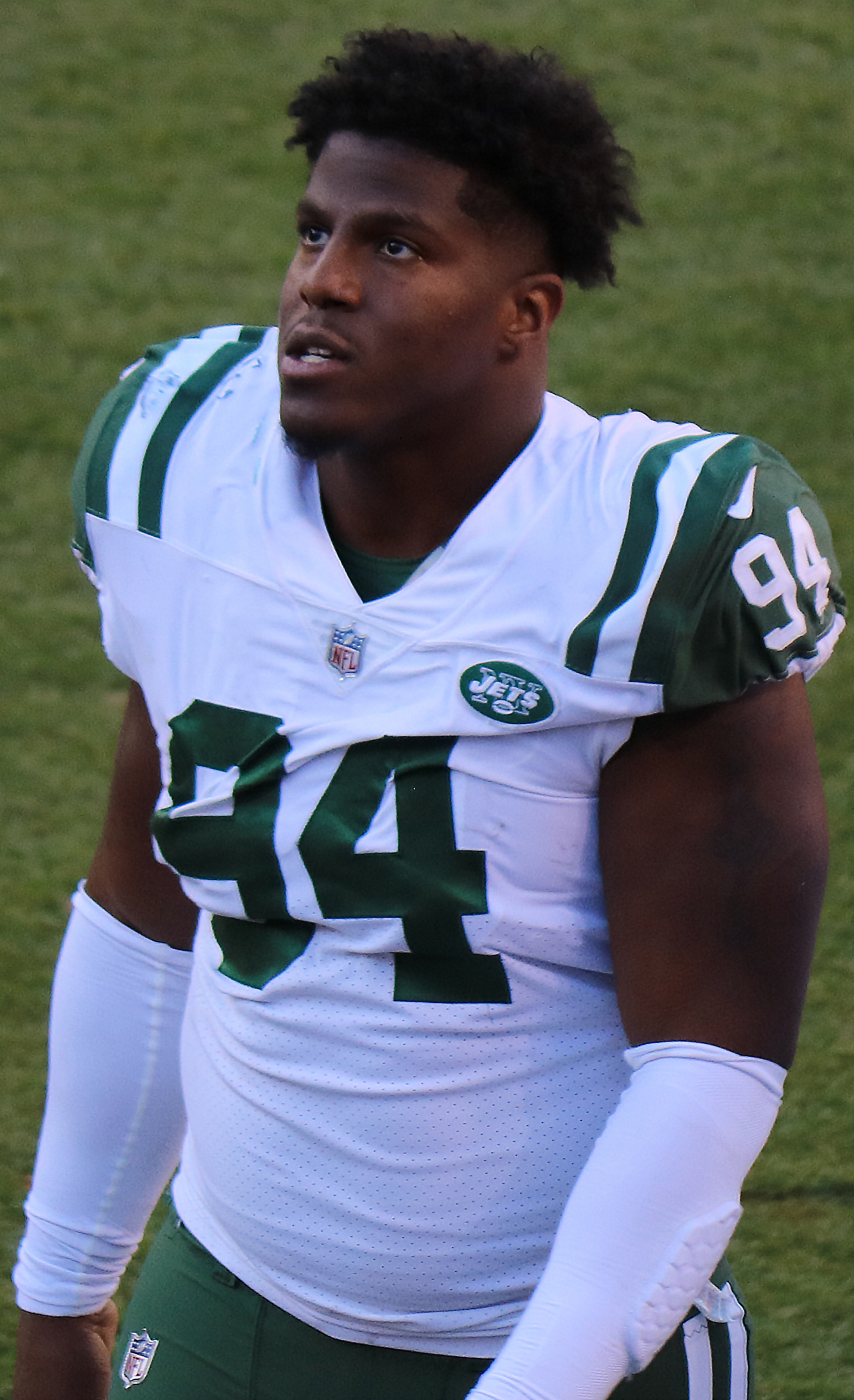
- Ealy with the New York Jets in 2017

Profile
- Position: Defensive end

Personal information
- Born: December 21, 1991 (age 34); Morganton, North Carolina, U.S.
- Listed height: 6 ft 4 in (1.93 m)
- Listed weight: 275 lb (125 kg)

Career information
- High school: New Madrid County Central (New Madrid, Missouri)
- College: Missouri (2011–2013)
- NFL draft: 2014: 2nd round, 60th overall pick

Career history
- Carolina Panthers (2014–2016); New England Patriots (2017)*; New York Jets (2017); Dallas Cowboys (2018)*; Oakland Raiders (2018); Houston Roughnecks (2020); Toronto Argonauts (2021); Vegas Knight Hawks (2022); Edmonton Elks (2022–2023)
- * Offseason or practice squad member only

Awards and highlights
- PFWA All-Rookie Team (2014); First-team All-SEC (2013)

Career NFL statistics
- Total tackles: 92
- Sacks: 15
- Forced fumbles: 6
- Fumble recoveries: 2
- Interceptions: 2
- Stats at Pro Football Reference

Kony Montoy Ealy (born December 21, 1991) is an American professional football defensive end. He played college football for the Missouri Tigers and was selected by the Carolina Panthers in the second round of the 2014 NFL draft.

== Early life ==
Ealy attended New Madrid County Central in New Madrid, Missouri, where he was a three-sport athlete in football, basketball and track. In football, he notched 89 tackles, including 31 tackles for loss, and 10.5 quarterback sacks while adding 21 quarterback hurries in his junior season; on offense, he caught 22 passes for 501 yards and 3 touchdowns.

He was a first-team All-state, All-conference, All-region and All-district selection as a senior, after he amassed 104 total tackles, 28 tackles for loss, 12.5 sacks, 31 quarterback pressures, 5 forced fumbles, 7 pass break ups, 4 blocked kicks. He was also a standout in basketball, where he earned All-state, and numerous All-district, All-region and All-conference honors.

Considered a four-star recruit by Rivals.com, Ealy was rated as the 11th best weakside defensive end prospect of his class.

College recruiting
Name	Hometown	School	Height	Weight	40^{‡}	Commit date
Kony Ealy; DE	New Madrid, Missouri	New Madrid County Central High School	6 ft 5 in (1.96 m)	230 lb (100 kg)	4.65	Feb 3, 2010
Kony Ealy; DE	Recruit ratings: Scout: Rivals: 247Sports: (78)					
Overall recruit ranking: Scout: 13 (DE) Rivals: 11 (DE), 3 (MO) ESPN: 49 (DE)
‡ Refers to 40-yard dash; Note: In many cases, Scout, Rivals, 247Sports, On3, and ESPN may conflict in their listings of height, weight and 40 time.; In these cases, the average was taken. ESPN grades are on a 100-point scale.; Sources: "Missouri Football Commitment List (23)". Rivals.; "2010 Missouri College Football Recruiting Commits". Scout.; "ESPN". ESPN.; "Scout.com Team Recruiting Rankings". Scout.; "2010 Team Ranking". Rivals.com.

== College career ==
Ealy accepted a football scholarship from the University of Missouri. In 2010, he was redshirted as a true freshman. In 2011, Ealy earned a back-up role, recording 13 tackles, one sack, and three tackles for loss in 12 games. He made his first career start at Baylor. During the Independence Bowl against North Carolina, Ealy recorded 2 tackles, including a half-tackle for loss. He was named to the Big 12 Conference All-Freshman Team.

In 2012, he started 10 games for the Tigers, recording 37 tackles, including 10 tackles for loss, 3.5 sacks and 7 pass break-ups, and 5 quarterback pressures. In 2013, he started all 14 games, setting a new career high in tackles with 43, tackles for loss with 14.5, and sacks with 9.5, while forcing three fumbles and intercepting one pass which he returned 49 yards for a touchdown against Indiana. For his play, Ealy was named to the first-team All-Southeastern Conference (SEC).

Ealy announced on January 3, 2014, that he would forgo his senior season and enter the 2014 NFL draft.

== Professional career ==
=== Pre-draft ===
As a sophomore the year before, Ealy was given a third round grade by the NFL Draft Advisory Board, which is typically conservative when projecting the draft positions of underclassmen. Following his breakout junior campaign, Ealy was a projected first round pick by numerous outlets, including the Carolina Panthers general manager Dave Gettleman, with some projecting him as a potential top 10 selection. His combination of length, athleticism, and versatility drew comparisons to players including Robert Quinn, Michael Bennett, and Chandler Jones. Dallas Cowboys executive vice president Stephen Jones noted after the 2014 NFL draft that had the Cowboys not traded the number 47 overall selection in a deal to move up to select Boise State defensive end DeMarcus Lawrence, they would have used that pick to draft Ealy, whom they regarded as an immediate starter.

Pre-draft measurables
Height	Weight	Arm length	Hand span	40-yard dash	10-yard split	20-yard split	20-yard shuttle	Three-cone drill	Vertical jump	Broad jump	Bench press
6 ft 4 in (1.93 m)	273 lb (124 kg)	34 1/4 in (0.87 m)	9 1/2 in (0.24 m)	4.69 s	1.69 s	2.75 s	4.45 s	6.83 s	32 in (0.81 m)	10 ft 0 in (3.05 m)	22 reps
All values from NFL Combine or Missouri Pro Day

=== Carolina Panthers ===
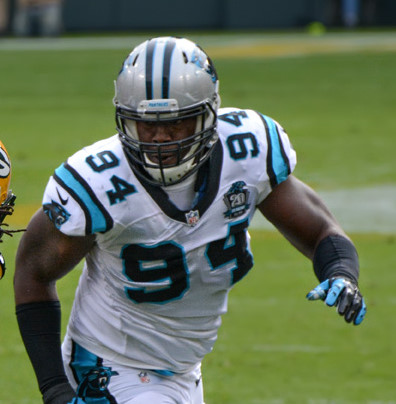
Ealy with the Carolina Panthers in 2014

Ealy was selected by the Panthers in the second round (60th overall) pick of the 2014 NFL draft. On May 29, 2014, he signed a four-year $3.55 million deal. Per Pro Football Focus, Ealy was one of the highest-graded run defenders of the NFL in the preseason. He made his NFL debut performance in Week 2 when the Panthers defeated the Detroit Lions in a 24–7 victory. In their Week 8 matchup against the defending champion Seattle Seahawks, Ealy had his best game of the season with two solo tackles and the first sack of his NFL career against Russell Wilson. In their Week 14 win over the Tampa Bay Buccaneers, Ealy recorded his second career NFL sack against Josh McCown. Ealy followed this up with another sack of Brian Hoyer during the Panthers Week 15 win over the Cleveland Browns, beating Joe Thomas. On December 23, 2014, Ealy was named to Sports Illustrated All-Rookie Team. During the final game of the season, Ealy recorded a sack on Atlanta quarterback, Matt Ryan, recording a sack in each of the final three games of his rookie season. Over the final four games of the season, Ealy also recorded nine QB pressures to double his total over any other four game segment of his rookie season. Ealy finished his rookie season with 12 tackles, 4 sacks, and 1 forced fumble. He was named to the PFWA All-Rookie Team.

Ealy's development continued through the 2015 preseason where he recorded two sacks and was named a full-time starter opposite to Charles Johnson. During the Panthers Week 2 victory over the Houston Texans, Ealy recorded his first quarterback pressure of the year. During the Panthers Week 4 victory over the Tampa Bay Buccaneers, Ealy recorded a career-high five tackles, 1 TFL, and a QB hit. During the Panthers victory over the Indianapolis Colts during Week 7, Ealy recorded his first strip sack of the season against quarterback Andrew Luck. During the Panthers 37–29 victory over the Green Bay Packers that helped the Panthers move to 8–0 in the first time in franchise history, Ealy recorded a strip sack for the second consecutive week against quarterback Aaron Rodgers. Ealy managed 10 quarterback pressures through six games, but recorded six over the last two games. The following week, Ealy picked up a sack in his third straight game against Marcus Mariota during the Panthers 27–10 victory over the Tennessee Titans. The next week, during the Panthers 44–16 victory over the Washington Redskins to move them to 10–0, Ealy had his fourth straight game with a sack of quarterback Kirk Cousins and on the same play, recorded a forced fumble and a fumble recovery. During the Panthers 33–14 victory over the Cowboys, Ealy recorded a sack in his 5th straight game. During Super Bowl 50 against the Denver Broncos, Ealy tied the Super Bowl record and set the Panthers' postseason record with three sacks, accomplishing this in only 23 total snaps. In addition, he recorded an interception and forced fumble in the game. The Panthers lost the Super Bowl by a score of 24–10. Ealy became the first player in Super Bowl history to have an interception and multiple sacks. He was the first player since 1993 to record multiple sacks, an interception and a forced fumble in a postseason game. He tied both Reggie White and Darnell Dockett for the most sacks in a Super Bowl with three.

In 2016, Ealy played all 16 games, but only started six. He recorded 32 tackles, five sacks, and one interception.

=== New England Patriots ===
On March 10, 2017, Ealy was traded to the New England Patriots along with a third-round draft pick in the 2017 NFL draft in exchange for New England's 2017 second-round draft pick. On August 26, Ealy was waived by the team.

=== New York Jets ===
On August 27, 2017, Ealy was claimed off waivers by the New York Jets. In the team's Week 4 win over the Jacksonville Jaguars, he recorded his second career interception after batting down a pass from quarterback Blake Bortles.

=== Dallas Cowboys ===
On April 5, 2018, Ealy signed as a free agent with the Dallas Cowboys, who had coveted him as a player since the 2014 NFL draft. He could never distinguish himself in preseason, even after being tried at defensive tackle. Ealy was released by Dallas on September 1.

=== Oakland Raiders ===
On November 5, 2018, Ealy was signed by the Oakland Raiders. He was released by the Raiders on November 13. Ealy re-signed with the club on December 5.

=== Houston Roughnecks ===
In October 2019, Ealy was picked by the Houston Roughnecks of the XFL during the open phase of the 2020 XFL draft. In March, amid the COVID-19 pandemic, the league announced that it would be cancelling the rest of the season. Playing in all 5 games, he had 9 tackles (2 for loss) and half a sack. He had his contract terminated when the league suspended operations on April 10, 2020.

=== Toronto Argonauts ===
On February 22, 2021, Ealy signed with the Toronto Argonauts of the Canadian Football League (CFL). In the following year, he was released with the final training camp cuts on June 5, 2022.

=== Vegas Knight Hawks ===
On June 15, 2022, Ealy signed with the Vegas Knight Hawks of the Indoor Football League (IFL).

=== Edmonton Elks ===
On July 21, 2022, Ealy signed with the Edmonton Elks of the CFL. He was released by Edmonton on October 24, 2023.

== NFL career statistics ==
Regular season statistics
Year	Team	Games		Tackles					Interceptions						Fumbles	
Year	Team	GP	GS	Cmb	Solo	Ast	Sck	Sfty	PD	Int	Yds	Avg	Lng	TD	FF	FR
2014	CAR	15	0	12	8	4	4.0	0	0	—	—	—	—	—	1	0
2015	CAR	16	9	32	15	17	5.0	0	2	—	—	—	—	—	3	2
2016	CAR	16	6	32	19	13	5.0	0	3	1	7	7.0	7	0	2	0
2017	NYJ	15	4	14	11	3	1.0	0	9	1	9	9.0	9	0	0	0
Total		62	19	90	53	37	15.0	0	14	2	16	8.0	9	0	6	2

Postseason statistics
Year	Team	Games		Tackles					Interceptions						Fumbles	
Year	Team	GP	GS	Cmb	Solo	Ast	Sck	Sfty	PD	Int	Yds	Avg	Lng	TD	FF	FR
2014	CAR	2	0	4	1	3	0.0	0	0	—	—	—	—	—	0	0
2015	CAR	3	1	7	4	3	3.0	0	1	1	19	19.0	19	0	1	1
Total		5	1	11	5	6	3.0	0	1	1	19	19.0	19	0	1	1

== Personal life ==
Ealy had two half sisters, LaToya Brown and Sierra Jones. Sierra is one-year older than Ealy and suffers from a rare, lifelong chromosome disorder. LaToya died in September 2017 from a respiratory disease.

He is a father of one daughter, Royal, who was born in November 2015.
