= Catron, Missouri =

- City
- Location of Catron, Missouri
- Coordinates: 36°36′40″N 89°42′22″W
- Country: United States
- State: Missouri
- County: New Madrid

Area
  - Total: 0.37 sq mi (0.96 km^{2})
  - Land: 0.37 sq mi (0.96 km^{2})
  - Water: 0 sq mi (0.00 km^{2})
- Elevation: 282 ft (86 m)

Population (2020)
  - Total: 41
  - Density: 110.3/sq mi (42.58/km^{2})
- Time zone: UTC-6 (Central (CST))
  - Summer (DST): UTC-5 (CDT)
- ZIP code: 63833
- Area code: 573
- FIPS code: 29-12052
- GNIS feature ID: 2396630

Catron is a city in New Madrid County, Missouri, United States. The population was 41 at the 2020 census.

== History ==
A post office called Catron has been in operation since 1893. The community has the name of W. C. Catron, a pioneer citizen.

== Geography ==
According to the United States Census Bureau, the city has a total area of 0.37 square miles (0.96 km^{2}), all land.

== Demographics ==
Historical population
Census	Pop.	Note	%±
1930	152		—
1940	259		70.4%
1950	278		7.3%
1960	177		−36.3%
1970	122		−31.1%
1980	180		47.5%
1990	81		−55.0%
2000	68		−16.0%
2010	67		−1.5%
2020	41		−38.8%
U.S. Decennial Census

=== 2010 census ===
As of the census of 2010, there were 67 people, 28 households, and 17 families living in the city. The population density was 181.1 inhabitants per square mile (69.9/km^{2}). There were 32 housing units at an average density of 86.5 per square mile (33.4/km^{2}). The racial makeup of the city was 83.58% White, 14.93% Black or African American, and 1.49% from two or more races.

There were 28 households, of which 28.6% had children under the age of 18 living with them, 42.9% were married couples living together, 7.1% had a female householder with no husband present, 10.7% had a male householder with no wife present, and 39.3% were non-families. 25.0% of all households were made up of individuals, and 17.8% had someone living alone who was 65 years of age or older. The average household size was 2.39 and the average family size was 2.94.

The median age in the city was 46.5 years. 25.4% of residents were under the age of 18; 6.1% were between the ages of 18 and 24; 18% were from 25 to 44; 35.9% were from 45 to 64; and 14.9% were 65 years of age or older. The gender makeup of the city was 55.2% male and 44.8% female.

=== 2000 census ===
As of the census of 2000, there were 68 people, 29 households, and 18 families living in the town. The population density was 171.6 inhabitants per square mile (66.3/km^{2}). There were 38 housing units at an average density of 95.9 per square mile (37.0/km^{2}). The racial makeup of the town was 77.94% White and 22.06% African American.

There were 29 households, out of which 24.1% had children under the age of 18 living with them, 51.7% were married couples living together, 10.3% had a female householder with no husband present, and 37.9% were non-families. 34.5% of all households were made up of individuals, and 13.8% had someone living alone who was 65 years of age or older. The average household size was 2.34 and the average family size was 3.11.

In the town the population was spread out, with 22.1% under the age of 18, 7.4% from 18 to 24, 26.5% from 25 to 44, 30.9% from 45 to 64, and 13.2% who were 65 years of age or older. The median age was 40 years. For every 100 females there were 88.9 males. For every 100 females age 18 and over, there were 96.3 males.

The median income for a household in the town was $21,250, and the median income for a family was $40,000. Males had a median income of $18,750 versus $25,625 for females. The per capita income for the town was $9,909. There were 22.2% of families and 42.7% of the population living below the poverty line, including 60.9% of under eighteens and 50.0% of those over 64.

== Education ==
It is in the New Madrid County R-I School District. Central High School is the district's comprehensive high school.

Three Rivers College's service area includes New Madrid County.
