= 1865 Memphis earthquake =

Earthquake in North America

- Location within Tennessee
- UTC time: 1865-08-17 15:00
- USGS-ANSS: ComCat
- Local date: August 17, 1865
- Magnitude: 4.7 M_{fa}
- Epicenter: 36.0°N 89.5°W
- Areas affected: Tennessee; United States
- Max. intensity: MMI VII (Very strong)

The 1865 Memphis earthquake struck southwest Tennessee near the Mississippi River in the United States on August 17 that year. Soon after the M_{fa} 5.0 earthquake hit, observers said the earth appeared to undulate and waves formed in nearby rivers. The force of the earthquake felled and cracked chimneys in Memphis and New Madrid, Missouri on the other side of the Mississippi. Shaking from the earthquake spread as far as St. Louis, Missouri; Jackson, Mississippi; and Illinois. Apart from the 1811–12 New Madrid earthquakes, only three major events have struck the state of Tennessee, in 1843, 1865, and 1895. Several minor events have taken place as well.

== Background ==
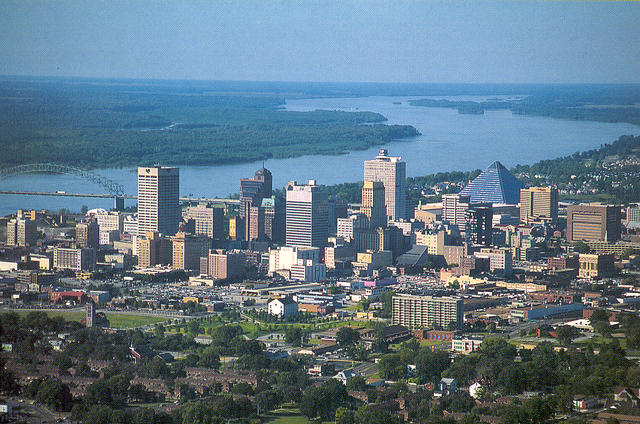
The skyline of Memphis.

The earliest earthquakes known to have struck Tennessee were the series known as the New Madrid earthquakes, which rocked the Midwestern United States from their base in Missouri. Damage consisted of fallen chimneys on buildings. More significant were major geologic changes, including sand volcanoes, fissures, and even sinking of land. Three major earthquake events occurred in Tennessee in 1843, 1865, and 1895. The 1843 event registered Mercalli intensities of VIII (Severe); it resulted in cracking walls, shattering windows, and toppling chimneys. Felt over an area of 1,000,000 square kilometers (386,102 sq mi), the earthquake caused more alarm than damage in Western Tennessee.

== Damage and intensity ==
Shaking in 1865 felled chimneys in Memphis, and the earth "appeared to undulate", creating small waves on rivers nearby. The earthquake was felt from Illinois throughout the lower Mississippi Valley from Illinois to Mississippi. According to a 1993 paper by the United States Geological Survey, this event had a magnitude of 5.0 and a Mercalli intensity of VII (Very strong). This body wave magnitude was derived using either the felt area of the shock or an isoseismal map. In a 2009 report, "Tennessee Earthquake History", the USGS did not include the 1865 earthquake. It classified the 1843 temblor as having a greater Mercalli intensity of VIII (Severe), compared to the 1865 event.

== See also ==
- List of earthquakes in the United States
- List of historical earthquakes
