= New Madrid County R-I School District =

School district in Missouri, U.S.

New Madrid County R-I School District (NMCR1) is a school district with its administration building in New Madrid County, Missouri.

The district covers portions of New Madrid County, including Canalou, Catron, Howardville, Lilbourn, Marston, Matthews, New Madrid, North Lilbourn, and Parma. Sections of Sikeston extend into this district. The district extends into Stoddard County.

== History ==
The New Madrid County R-1 Enlarged School District was created in 1968 as the merger of the Higgerson, Lilbourn, Matthews, New Madrid, Parma, and Portageville school districts. This was because a referendum held on July 9 that year succeeded. This was after the New Madrid County Board of Education, in 1966, asked the Missouri State Department of Education to create a feasibility study for district consolidation. For much of the district's history, it maintained five separate high schools in Lilbourn, Matthews, New Madrid, Parma, and Portageville. Masterson had previously been the interim superintendent after Sam Duncan retired.

== Schools ==
The district has three elementary schools: Lilbourn, Matthews, and New Madrid. It has Central Middle School and Central High School.
