= Lilbourn, Missouri =

- City
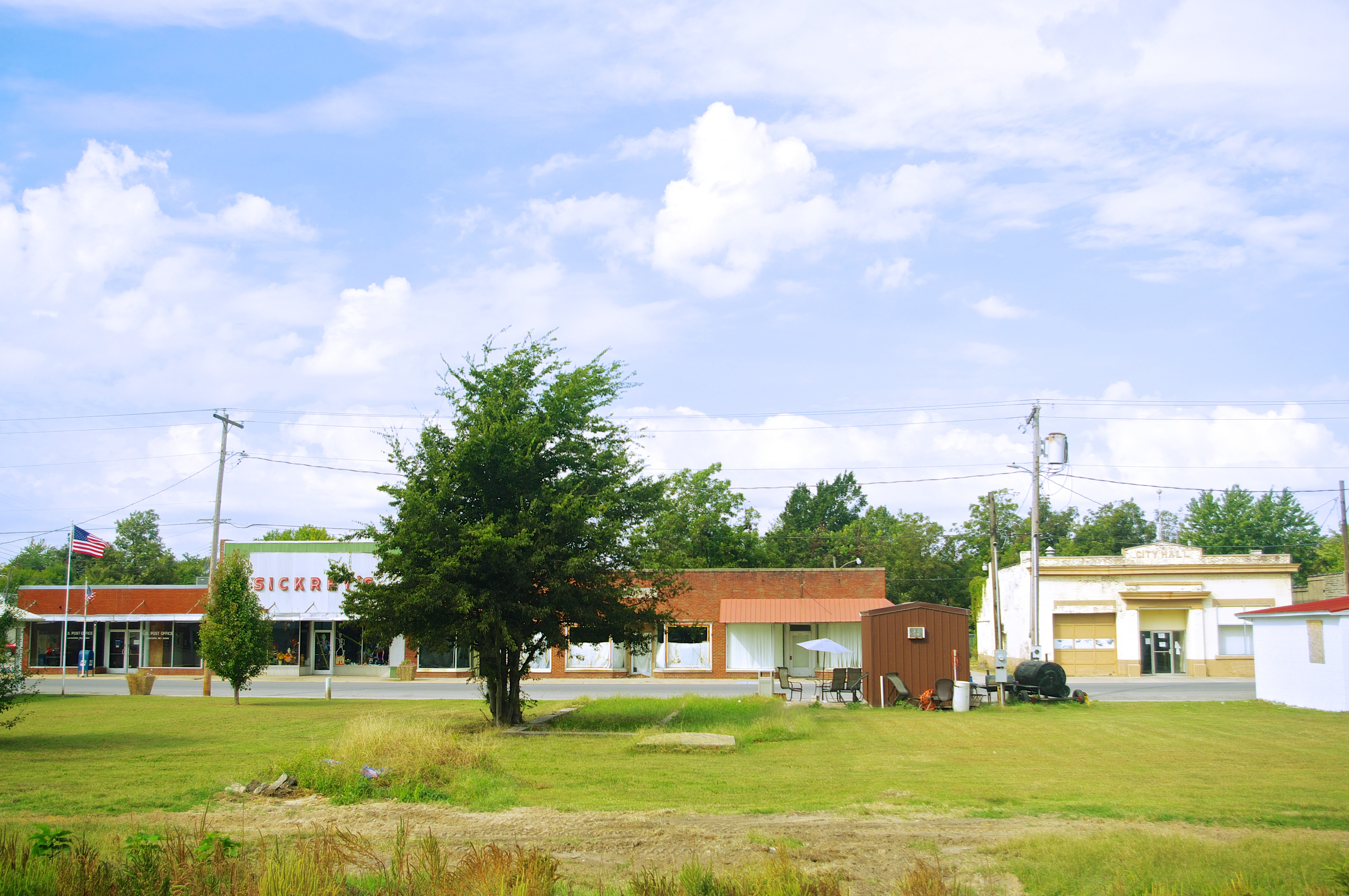
- Lilbourn

- Location of Lilbourn, Missouri
- Coordinates: 36°35′27″N 89°36′46″W
- Country: United States
- State: Missouri
- County: New Madrid

Area
  - Total: 0.95 sq mi (2.45 km^{2})
  - Land: 0.95 sq mi (2.45 km^{2})
  - Water: 0 sq mi (0.00 km^{2})
- Elevation: 285 ft (87 m)

Population (2020)
  - Total: 994
  - Density: 1,051.1/sq mi (405.82/km^{2})
- Time zone: UTC-6 (Central (CST))
  - Summer (DST): UTC-5 (CDT)
- ZIP code: 63862
- Area code: 573
- FIPS code: 29-42536
- GNIS feature ID: 2395707
- Website: www.cityoflilbournmo.com

Lilbourn is a city in New Madrid County, Missouri, United States. The population was 994 at the 2020 census.

== History ==
A post office called Lilbourn has been in operation since 1902. The community was named for Lilbourn Lewis, an early settler.

== Geography ==
The city is concentrated along Missouri Route D (3rd Street), 1.5 miles north of the road's intersection with U.S. Route 62. Lilbourn is flanked by the small village of North Lilbourn to the northwest. New Madrid lies four miles to the east, and Marston lies five miles to the south. The Little River passes 1.5 miles west of Lilbourn. The St. Louis Southwestern Railway passes through the south part of the community.

According to the United States Census Bureau, the city has a total area of 0.94 square miles (2.43 km^{2}), all land.

== Demographics ==
Historical population
Census	Pop.	Note	%±
1910	484		—
1920	986		103.7%
1930	1,154		17.0%
1940	1,378		19.4%
1950	1,361		−1.2%
1960	1,216		−10.7%
1970	1,152		−5.3%
1980	1,463		27.0%
1990	1,378		−5.8%
2000	1,303		−5.4%
2010	1,190		−8.7%
2020	994		−16.5%
U.S. Decennial Census

=== 2010 census ===
As of the census of 2010, there were 1,190 people, 489 households, and 320 families living in the city. The population density was 1,266.0 inhabitants per square mile (488.8/km^{2}). There were 554 housing units at an average density of 589.4 per square mile (227.6/km^{2}). The racial makeup of the city was 63.95% White, 34.12% Black or African American, 0.25% Native American, and 1.68% from two or more races. Hispanic or Latino of any race were 0.25% of the population.

There were 489 households, of which 34.2% had children under the age of 18 living with them, 37.6% were married couples living together, 21.5% had a female householder with no husband present, 6.3% had a male householder with no wife present, and 34.6% were non-families. 30.5% of all households were made up of individuals, and 13.5% had someone living alone who was 65 years of age or older. The average household size was 2.43 and the average family size was 2.96.

The median age in the city was 38.7 years. 26.6% of residents were under the age of 18; 9.7% were between the ages of 18 and 24; 22.3% were from 25 to 44; 26.9% were from 45 to 64; and 14.6% were 65 years of age or older. The gender makeup of the city was 46.2% male and 53.8% female.

=== 2000 census ===
As of the census of 2000, there were 1,303 people, 512 households, and 352 families living in the city. The population density was 1,482.5 inhabitants per square mile (572.4/km^{2}). There were 572 housing units at an average density of 650.8 per square mile (251.3/km^{2}). The racial makeup of the city was 65.46% White, 32.69% African American, 0.08% Native American, 0.08% Asian, 0.92% from other races, and 0.77% from two or more races. Hispanic or Latino of any race were 1.15% of the population.

There were 512 households, out of which 35.0% had children under the age of 18 living with them, 44.7% were married couples living together, 19.9% had a female householder with no husband present, and 31.1% were non-families. 27.7% of all households were made up of individuals, and 15.6% had someone living alone who was 65 years of age or older. The average household size was 2.54 and the average family size was 3.11.

In the city the population was spread out, with 30.9% under the age of 18, 7.4% from 18 to 24, 25.4% from 25 to 44, 22.3% from 45 to 64, and 14.0% who were 65 years of age or older. The median age was 35 years. For every 100 females there were 85.9 males. For every 100 females age 18 and over, there were 78.6 males.

The median income for a household in the city was $23,512, and the median income for a family was $31,786. Males had a median income of $29,688 versus $23,125 for females. The per capita income for the city was $13,460. About 19.0% of families and 25.0% of the population were below the poverty line, including 32.4% of those under age 18 and 29.5% of those age 65 or over.

== Education ==
It is in the New Madrid County R-I School District. Central High School is the district's comprehensive high school.

Previously Lilbourn had its own high school; a new high school was scheduled to open around 1957.

Lilbourn has a public library, the Lilbourn Memorial Library.

Three Rivers College's service area includes New Madrid County.
