= Matthews, Missouri =

- City
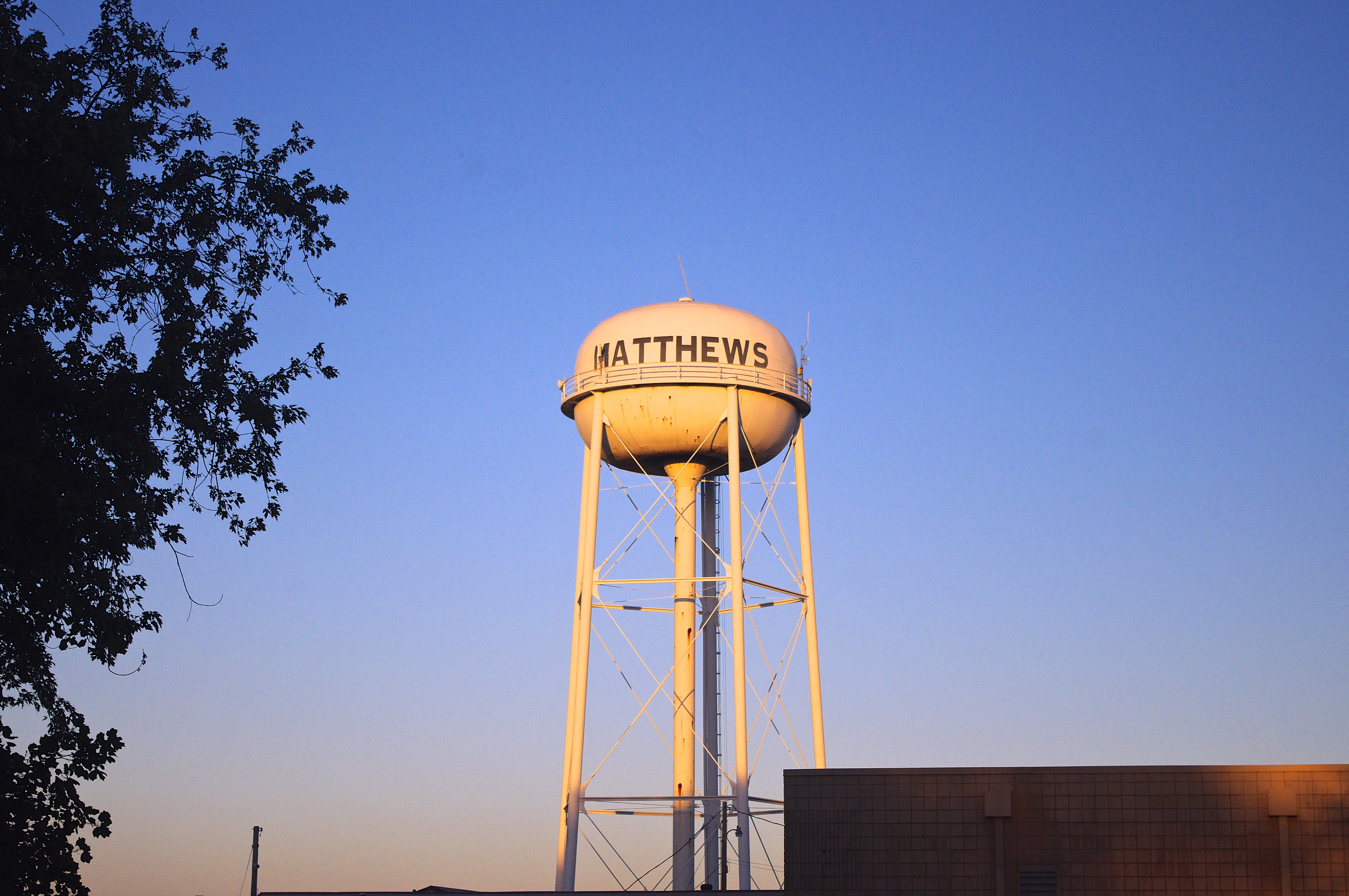
- Water tower in Matthews

- Location of Matthews, Missouri
- Coordinates: 36°45′28″N 89°34′12″W
- Country: United States
- State: Missouri
- County: New Madrid

Area
  - Total: 1.96 sq mi (5.07 km^{2})
  - Land: 1.96 sq mi (5.07 km^{2})
  - Water: 0 sq mi (0.00 km^{2})
- Elevation: 312 ft (95 m)

Population (2020)
  - Total: 534
  - Density: 272.8/sq mi (105.34/km^{2})
- Time zone: UTC-6 (Central (CST))
  - Summer (DST): UTC-5 (CDT)
- ZIP code: 63867
- Area code: 573
- FIPS code: 29-46730
- GNIS feature ID: 2395045
- Website: www.cityofmatthews.org

Matthews is a city in New Madrid County, Missouri, United States. The population was 534 at the 2020 census.

== History ==
A post office called Matthews has been in operation since 1903. The community has the name of C. D. Matthews, a pioneer citizen.

== Geography ==
Matthews is concentrated along County Road H (Main Street), mostly west of the road's intersection with U.S. Routes 61 and 62 and Missouri Route 80, though the city's municipal boundaries extend eastward beyond this intersection to Interstate 55. US Route 61 and US Route 62 connect Matthews with Sikeston to the north and New Madrid to the south.

According to the U.S. Census Bureau, the city has a total area of 1.96 square miles (5.08 km^{2}), all land.

== Demographics ==
Historical population
Census	Pop.	Note	%±
1910	237		—
1920	378		59.5%
1930	359		−5.0%
1940	448		24.8%
1950	498		11.2%
1960	450		−9.6%
1970	538		19.6%
1980	547		1.7%
1990	614		12.2%
2000	605		−1.5%
2010	628		3.8%
2020	534		−15.0%
U.S. Decennial Census

=== 2010 census ===
As of the census of 2010, there were 628 people, 247 households, and 158 families living in the city. The population density was 320.4 inhabitants per square mile (123.7/km^{2}). There were 267 housing units at an average density of 136.2 per square mile (52.6/km^{2}). The racial makeup of the city was 97.13% White, 1.91% Black or African American, 0.48% Native American, 0.16% from other races, and 0.32% from two or more races. Hispanic or Latino of any race were 0.32% of the population.

There were 247 households, of which 26.7% had children under the age of 18 living with them, 47.4% were married couples living together, 13.0% had a female householder with no husband present, 3.6% had a male householder with no wife present, and 36.0% were non-families. 31.2% of all households were made up of individuals, and 14.5% had someone living alone who was 65 years of age or older. The average household size was 2.26 and the average family size was 2.77.

The median age in the city was 48.8 years. 16.7% of residents were under the age of 18; 6.1% were between the ages of 18 and 24; 23.3% were from 25 to 44; 32.7% were from 45 to 64; and 21% were 65 years of age or older. The gender makeup of the city was 46.0% male and 54.0% female.

=== 2000 census ===
As of the census of 2000, there were 605 people, 252 households, and 179 families living in the city. The population density was 548.6 inhabitants per square mile (211.8/km^{2}). There were 278 housing units at an average density of 252.1 per square mile (97.3/km^{2}). The racial makeup of the city was 97.85% White, 0.17% African American, 0.33% Native American, 0.99% from other races, and 0.66% from two or more races. Hispanic or Latino of any race were 1.49% of the population.

There were 252 households, out of which 32.9% had children under the age of 18 living with them, 56.0% were married couples living together, 11.9% had a female householder with no husband present, and 28.6% were non-families. 27.0% of all households were made up of individuals, and 14.3% had someone living alone who was 65 years of age or older. The average household size was 2.38 and the average family size was 2.85.

In the city the population was spread out, with 26.4% under the age of 18, 7.4% from 18 to 24, 27.3% from 25 to 44, 22.8% from 45 to 64, and 16.0% who were 65 years of age or older. The median age was 40 years. For every 100 females there were 92.1 males. For every 100 females age 18 and over, there were 90.2 males.

The median income for a household in the city was $28,083, and the median income for a family was $30,655. Males had a median income of $27,500 versus $15,417 for females. The per capita income for the city was $13,426. About 7.8% of families and 9.1% of the population were below the poverty line, including 12.3% of those under age 18 and 8.2% of those age 65 or over.

== Education ==
It is in the New Madrid County R-I School District. The New Madrid County R-I School District operates one school in Matthews, Matthews Elementary School. Central High School is the district's comprehensive high school.

Matthews has a lending library, a branch of the New Madrid County Library.

Three Rivers College's service area includes New Madrid County.
