= Marston, Missouri =

- City
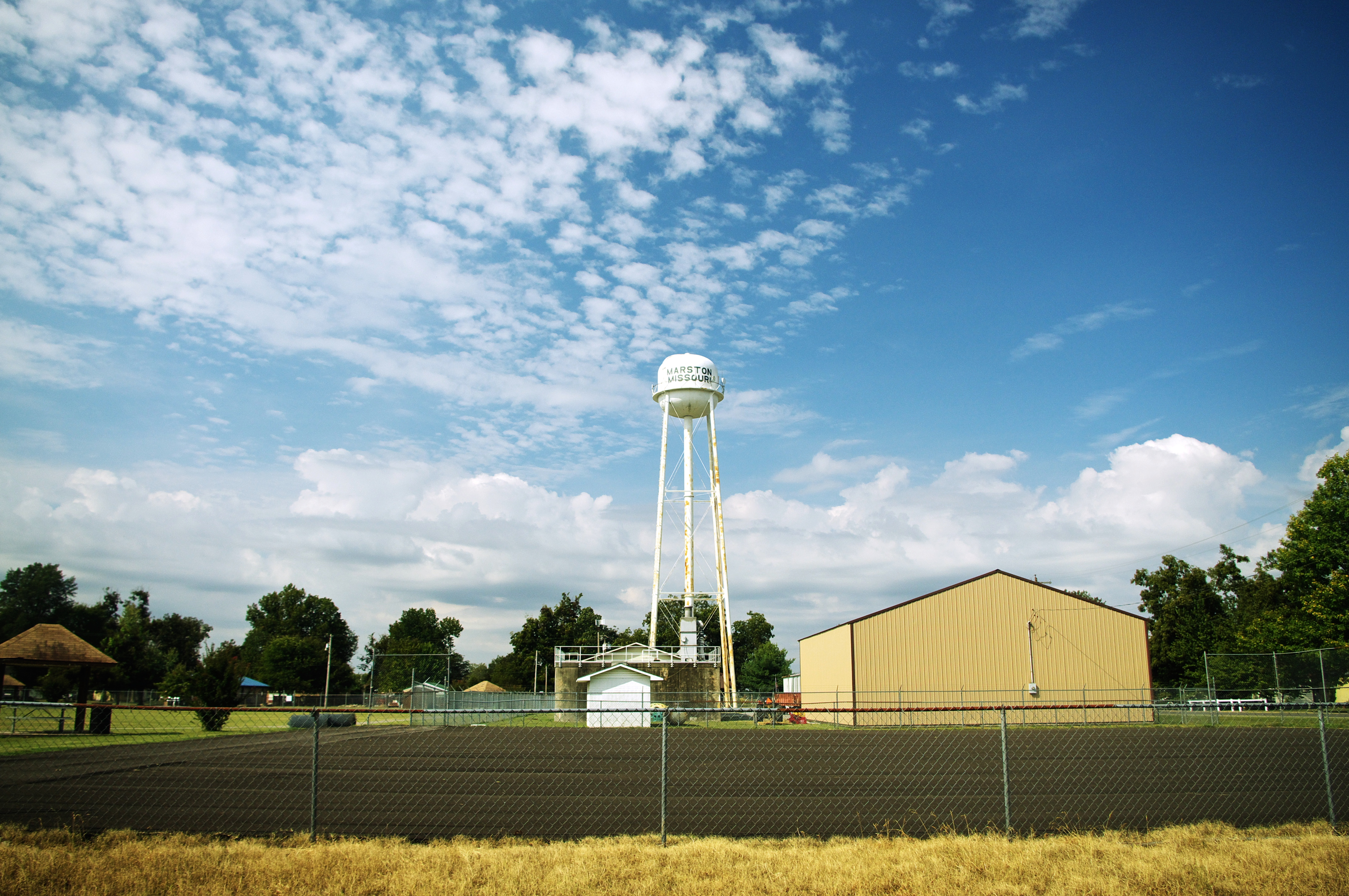
- Marston

- Location within New Madrid County and Missouri
- Coordinates: 36°31′04″N 89°36′23″W
- Country: United States
- State: Missouri
- County: New Madrid

Area
  - Total: 1.10 sq mi (2.86 km^{2})
  - Land: 1.10 sq mi (2.86 km^{2})
  - Water: 0 sq mi (0.00 km^{2})
- Elevation: 292 ft (89 m)

Population (2020)
  - Total: 397
  - Density: 359.4/sq mi (138.76/km^{2})
- Time zone: UTC-6 (Central (CST))
  - Summer (DST): UTC-5 (CDT)
- ZIP code: 63866
- Area code: 573
- FIPS code: 29-46406
- GNIS feature ID: 2395026

Marston is a city in New Madrid County, Missouri, United States. The population was 397 at the 2020 census.

== History ==
A post office called Marston has been in operation since 1898. The community was named after the mother's maiden name of an early settler. Marston was incorporated in 1905.

== Geography ==
The city is situated along U.S. Route 61, just west of the Mississippi River. Interstate 55 passes through the eastern part of the city. Both I-55 and US 61 connect Marston with New Madrid to the northeast and Portageville to the southwest.

According to the United States Census Bureau, the city has a total area of 1.11 square miles (2.87 km^{2}), all land.

== Demographics ==
Historical population
Census	Pop.	Note	%±
1910	258		—
1920	438		69.8%
1930	350		−20.1%
1940	468		33.7%
1950	610		30.3%
1960	631		3.4%
1970	666		5.5%
1980	742		11.4%
1990	691		−6.9%
2000	610		−11.7%
2010	503		−17.5%
2020	397		−21.1%
U.S. Decennial Census

=== 2010 census ===
As of the census of 2010, there were 503 people, 226 households, and 137 families living in the city. The population density was 453.2 inhabitants per square mile (175.0/km^{2}). There were 249 housing units at an average density of 224.3 per square mile (86.6/km^{2}). The racial makeup of the city was 80.12% White, 17.69% Black or African American, 0.20% Native American, 0.20% Native Hawaiian or Pacific Islander, and 1.79% from two or more races. Hispanic or Latino of any race were 0.40% of the population.

There were 226 households, of which 28.8% had children under the age of 18 living with them, 38.5% were married couples living together, 16.4% had a female householder with no husband present, 5.8% had a male householder with no wife present, and 39.4% were non-families. 34.5% of all households were made up of individuals, and 11.6% had someone living alone who was 65 years of age or older. The average household size was 2.23 and the average family size was 2.82.

The median age in the city was 42.1 years. 22.3% of residents were under the age of 18; 8.3% were between the ages of 18 and 24; 23.6% were from 25 to 44; 31.5% were from 45 to 64; and 14.7% were 65 years of age or older. The gender makeup of the city was 46.5% male and 53.5% female.

=== 2000 census ===
As of the census of 2000, there were 610 people, 259 households, and 167 families living in the city. The population density was 553.7 inhabitants per square mile (213.8/km^{2}). There were 302 housing units at an average density of 274.1 per square mile (105.8/km^{2}). The racial makeup of the city was 76.39% White, 22.46% African American, 0.16% Native American, and 0.98% from two or more races. Hispanic or Latino of any race were 2.30% of the population.

There were 259 households, out of which 32.0% had children under the age of 18 living with them, 44.4% were married couples living together, 15.8% had a female householder with no husband present, and 35.5% were non-families. 31.3% of all households were made up of individuals, and 14.3% had someone living alone who was 65 years of age or older. The average household size was 2.36 and the average family size was 2.93.

In the city the population was spread out, with 26.4% under the age of 18, 8.7% from 18 to 24, 27.4% from 25 to 44, 22.0% from 45 to 64, and 15.6% who were 65 years of age or older. The median age was 37 years. For every 100 females, there were 94.3 males. For every 100 females age 18 and over, there were 90.3 males.

The median income for a household in the city was $20,375, and the median income for a family was $26,167. Males had a median income of $27,292 versus $20,000 for females. The per capita income for the city was $13,820. About 28.9% of families and 31.0% of the population were below the poverty line, including 41.8% of those under age 18 and 26.2% of those age 65 or over.

== Education ==
It is in the New Madrid County R-I School District. Central High School is the district's comprehensive high school.

Three Rivers College's service area includes New Madrid County.
