= North Lilbourn, Missouri =

- Village
- Location of North Lilbourn, Missouri
- Coordinates: 36°36′07″N 89°37′20″W
- Country: United States
- State: Missouri
- County: New Madrid

Area
  - Total: 0.17 sq mi (0.45 km^{2})
  - Land: 0.17 sq mi (0.45 km^{2})
  - Water: 0 sq mi (0.00 km^{2})
- Elevation: 282 ft (86 m)

Population (2020)
  - Total: 22
  - Density: 127.6/sq mi (49.26/km^{2})
- Time zone: UTC-6 (Central (CST))
  - Summer (DST): UTC-5 (CDT)
- ZIP code: 63862
- Area code: 573
- FIPS code: 29-53138
- GNIS feature ID: 2399518

North Lilbourn is a village in New Madrid County, Missouri, United States. The population was 22 at the 2020 census.

== Geography ==
According to the United States Census Bureau, the village has a total area of 0.17 square miles (0.44 km^{2}), all land.

== Demographics ==
Historical population
Census	Pop.	Note	%±
1960	301		—
1970	334		11.0%
1980	237		−29.0%
1990	157		−33.8%
2000	95		−39.5%
2010	49		−48.4%
2020	22		−55.1%
U.S. Decennial Census

=== 2020 census ===
North Lilbourn, Missouri – Racial and ethnic composition Note: the US Census treats Hispanic/Latino as an ethnic category. This table excludes Latinos from the racial categories and assigns them to a separate category. Hispanics/Latinos may be of any race.
Race / Ethnicity (NH = Non-Hispanic)	Pop 2000	Pop 2010	Pop 2020	% 2000	% 2010	% 2020
White alone (NH)	5	7	1	5.26%	14.29%	4.55%
Black or African American alone (NH)	89	42	18	93.68%	85.71%	81.82%
Native American or Alaska Native alone (NH)	0	0	1	0.00%	0.00%	4.55%
Asian alone (NH)	0	0	0	0.00%	0.00%	0.00%
Pacific Islander alone (NH)	0	0	0	0.00%	0.00%	0.00%
Other race alone (NH)	0	0	0	0.00%	0.00%	0.00%
Mixed race or Multiracial (NH)	1	0	1	1.05%	0.00%	4.55%
Hispanic or Latino (any race)	0	0	1	0.00%	0.00%	4.55%
Total	95	49	22	100.00%	100.00%	100.00%

=== 2010 census ===
As of the census of 2010, there were 49 people, 22 households, and 12 families living in the village. The population density was 288.2 inhabitants per square mile (111.3/km^{2}). There were 30 housing units at an average density of 176.5 per square mile (68.1/km^{2}). The racial makeup of the village was 14.29% White and 85.71% Black or African American.

There were 22 households, of which 18.2% had children under the age of 18 living with them, 22.7% were married couples living together, 13.6% had a female householder with no husband present, 18.2% had a male householder with no wife present, and 45.5% were non-families. 45.5% of all households were made up of individuals, and 27.2% had someone living alone who was 65 years of age or older. The average household size was 2.23 and the average family size was 3.00.

The median age in the village was 45.1 years. 14.3% of residents were under the age of 18; 6.1% were between the ages of 18 and 24; 28.6% were from 25 to 44; 30.6% were from 45 to 64; and 20.4% were 65 years of age or older. The gender makeup of the village was 63.3% male and 36.7% female.

=== 2000 census ===
As of the census of 2000, there were 95 people, 37 households, and 23 families living in the village. The population density was 550.3 inhabitants per square mile (212.5/km^{2}). There were 46 housing units at an average density of 266.4 per square mile (102.9/km^{2}). The racial makeup of the village was 5.26% White, 93.68% African American, and 1.05% from two or more races.

There were 37 households, out of which 27.0% had children under the age of 18 living with them, 18.9% were married couples living together, 32.4% had a female householder with no husband present, and 37.8% were non-families. 37.8% of all households were made up of individuals, and 21.6% had someone living alone who was 65 years of age or older. The average household size was 2.57 and the average family size was 3.35.

In the village, the population was spread out, with 30.5% under the age of 18, 6.3% from 18 to 24, 23.2% from 25 to 44, 22.1% from 45 to 64, and 17.9% who were 65 years of age or older. The median age was 36 years. For every 100 females, there were 93.9 males. For every 100 females age 18 and over, there were 88.6 males.

The median income for a household in the village was $11,563, and the median income for a family was $23,333. Males had a median income of $25,313 versus $15,250 for females. The per capita income for the village was $7,654. There were 36.7% of families and 38.2% of the population living below the poverty line, including 40.0% of under eighteens and 28.6% of those over 64.

== Education ==
It is in the New Madrid County R-I School District. Central High School is the district's comprehensive high school.

Three Rivers College's service area includes New Madrid County.
