= Andrew, Illinois =

- Unincorporated community
- Location within Illinois Location within the United States
- Coordinates: 39°53′44″N 89°38′24″W
- Country: United States
- State: Illinois
- County: Sangamon
- Elevation: 581 ft (177 m)
- Time zone: UTC-6 (Central (CST))
  - Summer (DST): UTC-5 (CDT)
- Area code: 217
- GNIS feature ID: 403518

Andrew is an unincorporated community in Fancy Creek Township, Sangamon County, Illinois, United States. Andrew is located on the Illinois and Midland Railroad 1.9 miles (3.1 km) west of Sherman.
