= Central High School (New Madrid County, Missouri) =

Coordinates: 36°34′24″N 89°35′08″W

New Madrid County Central High School

Location
- 310 Highway 61 North; New Madrid postal address, (New Madrid County), Missouri 63869; United States

Information
- Type: Public high school
- Staff: 31.40 (FTE)
- Enrollment: 363 (2023-2024)
- Student to teacher ratio: 11.56
- Colors: Green, white and gold
- Nickname: Eagles
- Website: www.nmceaglenation.com/o/chs

New Madrid County Central High School is a secondary school located in New Madrid County, Missouri. It serves grades 9–12 and is located just outside Howardville, Missouri.

It is a part of the New Madrid County R-I School District. The district includes the following New Madrid County communities: Canalou, Catron, Howardville, Lilbourn, Marston, Matthews, New Madrid, North Lilbourn, and Parma.

== History ==
The school became county-wide in 1980 when New Madrid, Lilbourn, and Parma High Schools (Matthews joined in 1983) all combined making New Madrid County Central High School. The district consists of one middle school, which is located on the same 60+ acre campus that the high school is on, and three elementary schools which are located in New Madrid, Lilbourn, and Matthews.

The high school principal is Jarred Shackleford.

== Athletics ==
In 1980 Mike Ellis of the Enterprise-Courier stated that the strength of the Central High basketball team came from that it was a consolidation of "several basketball-rich" former high schools. Jim Carr of the Daily American Republic wrote that the nature of the consolidation meant that members of the community anticipated that the school would have strong athletic teams; Carr described the former Lilbourn High School as being "powerful".

== Notable alumni ==
- Kony Ealy 2010, NFL Player
- Gabriel Garmon 2011, Fashion Designer/Stylist
- Shayla Day 1999, Film, Television, Theater Actress (Empire, Chicago Fire)
- Jake Baehr Professional Mascot. TRC, UCA, Springfield Cardinals
- Desmond Sims NFL Player
- Gabrielle Copeland Playboy
- Brandan Quinones Rapper/Producer known for his hit song “Ya Hear Me?”
- Willie Burden CFL football player, member of Canadian Football Hall of Fame
