= Selma, Missouri =

Unincorporated community in Missouri, U.S.

Coordinates: 38°08′59″N 90°20′29″W

Selma is an unincorporated community in southeastern Jefferson County, in the U.S. state of Missouri. The community is located on the west side of US Route 61 approximately six miles southeast of Festus. The Mississippi River floodplain lies two miles to the east.

== History ==
A post office called Selma was established in 1827, and remained in operation until 1913. Selma was named after a place mentioned in the Ossian cycle of poems.
