= New Madrid, Missouri =

City in Missouri, U.S.

- City
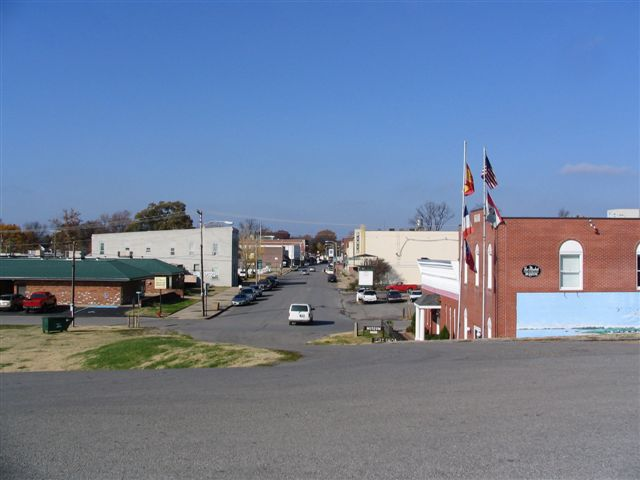
- New Madrid, facing away from the Mississippi

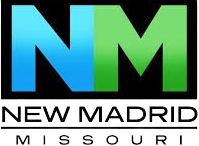
- Logo

- Location of New Madrid, Missouri
- Coordinates: 36°35′16″N 89°33′02″W
- Country: United States
- State: Missouri
- County: New Madrid

Area
  - Total: 4.54 sq mi (11.75 km^{2})
  - Land: 4.50 sq mi (11.66 km^{2})
  - Water: 0.035 sq mi (0.09 km^{2})
- Elevation: 292 ft (89 m)

Population (2020)
  - Total: 2,787
  - Density: 619.1/sq mi (239.05/km^{2})
- Time zone: UTC−6 (Central (CST))
  - Summer (DST): UTC−5 (CDT)
- ZIP code: 63869
- Area code: 573/235
- FIPS code: 29-52076
- GNIS feature ID: 2395206
- Website: new-madrid.mo.us

New Madrid (/ˈmædrɪd/ MAD-rid; Spanish: Nueva Madrid) is a city in and the county seat of New Madrid County, Missouri, United States. The population was 2,787 at the 2020 census. The city is located 42 miles (68 km) southwest of Cairo, Illinois, and north of an exclave of Fulton County, Kentucky, across the Mississippi River.

The town is on the north side of the Kentucky Bend in the Mississippi River, which is also known as "New Madrid Bend" or "Madrid Bend." The river curves in an oxbow around an exclave of Fulton County, Kentucky. Scientists expect the river eventually to cut across the neck of the peninsula and make a more direct channel, leaving the Kentucky territory as an island.

New Madrid was the epicenter of the very powerful 1811–12 New Madrid earthquakes.

== History ==
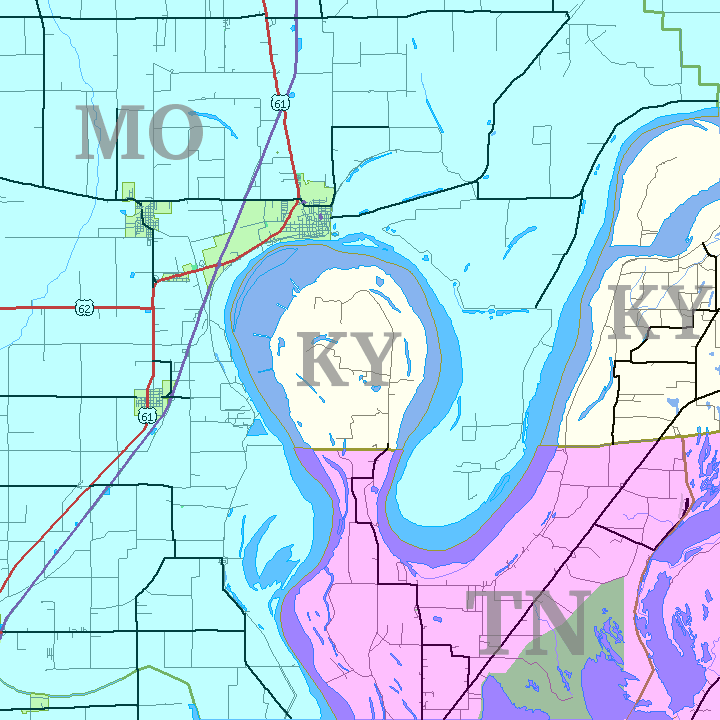
Kentucky Bend and surrounding area Missouri (MO) Tennessee (TN) Kentucky (KY)

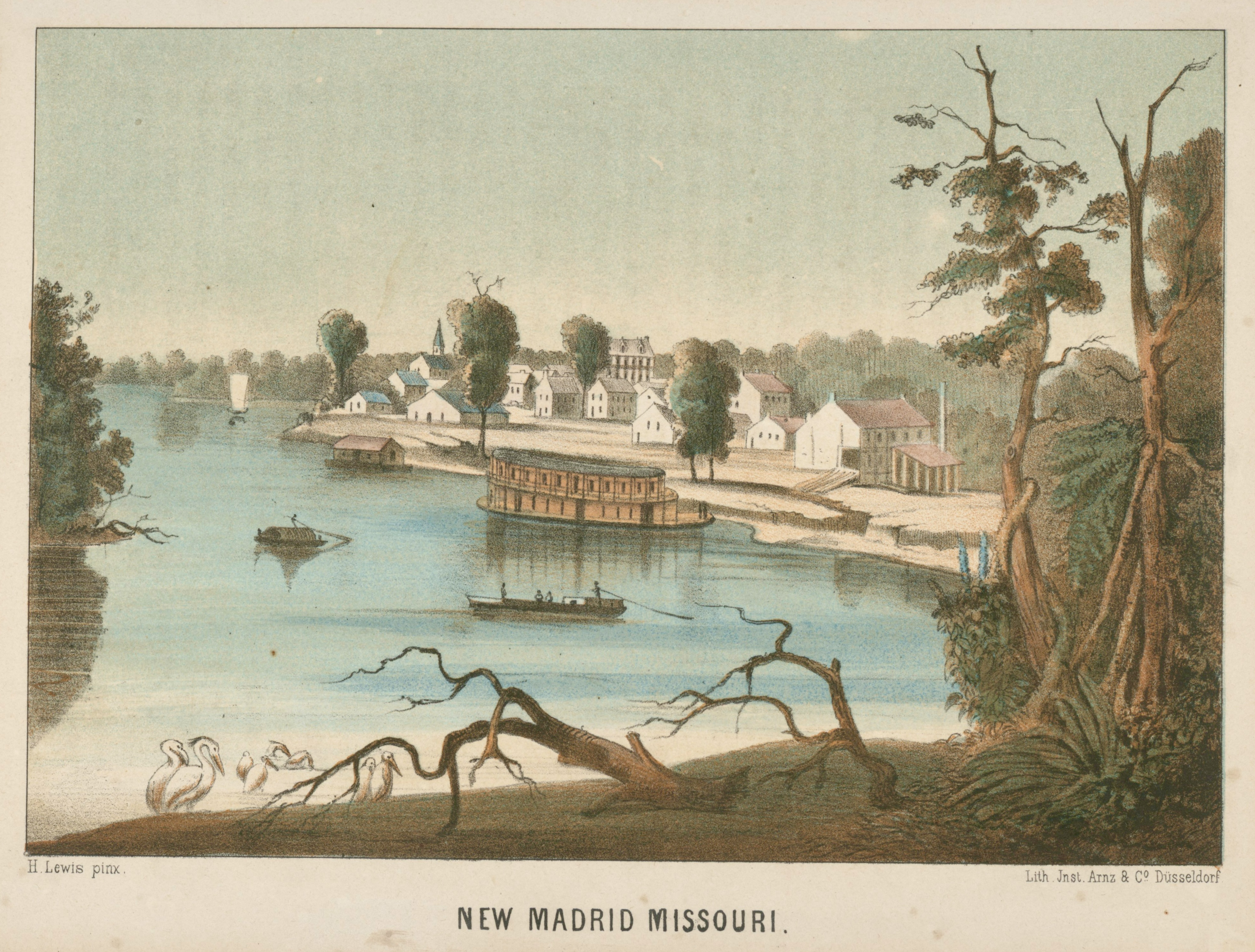
Lithographic print made 1854 depicting New Madrid shore from the Mississippi

The first more or less permanent settlement at present-day New Madrid was established by bands of Shawnee, Delaware, Creek, and Cherokee who were turned into refugees due to the U.S. War for Independence. These refugee Native American bands accepted Spanish offers to settle on the west bank of the Mississippi River in the early 1780s. These mixed Native American groups established a settlement and informal trading post where a northward, horseshoe bend of the Mississippi met the Chepusa creek, which provided an easy place for landing boats. Native American hunters and European-American merchants made the settlement a location for processing the bounty of hunts, including the valuable but messy fat of bears and buffalo, which was used in preparing skins and furs. The settlement quickly acquired the name L’Anse a la Graise — “Cove of Grease” or “Greasy Cove.”

European Americans renamed the settlement New Madrid around 1780 under the auspices of Spanish Governor Bernardo de Gálvez, who was appointed to rule Spanish Louisiana (the land west of the Mississippi River), and Manuel Pérez, Lieutenant Governor of Upper Louisiana in Saint Louis. They welcomed settlers from the United States, but required them to become subjects of (i.e. swear allegiance to) the Spanish crown. In addition, they had to agree to live under the guidance of his appointed empresario, Colonel George Morgan, an American Revolutionary War veteran from New Jersey. Morgan recruited a number of American families to settle at New Madrid, attracting a few hundred people to the region. Settlement in the 1790s and early 1800s remained relatively low due to the physical geography of New Madrid and its hinterlands. Morgan made commitments to nearby natives that settlers would not be permitted to hunt game for the purposes of large-scale fur trading, thus they would not be an economic threat to natives who relied on hunting.

The Mississippi frequently washed away the town's river banks, and a Spanish fort was washed away. Surrounded by low, swampy land, New Madrid developed a well-earned reputation for diseases, especially in the summer and fall. Spanish census data from the late 1790s show around 800 residents at the village of New Madrid. New Madrid continued to operate as a site of exchange between Native Americans in the St. Francis River Valley and European American traders operating out of New Madrid.

In 1800, Spain traded the territory back to France in the Third Treaty of San Ildefonso. After trying to regain control of Saint-Domingue (the present Haiti), where a slave rebellion was underway, Napoleon gave up on his North American colonies, agreeing to sell this territory to the United States in 1803 as part of the Louisiana Purchase.

By 1810, a fort, two blocks, and a portion of a third block was washed away by expansion of the Mississippi river.

The area is noted as the site of a series of nearly 2,000 earthquakes in 1811 and 1812, ranging up to approximately magnitude 8, the most powerful non-subduction zone earthquake ever recorded in the United States. New Madrid lies far from any plate boundaries, but it is on the New Madrid Seismic Zone. The major earthquake was felt as far away as the East Coast.

Starting in 1838, New Madrid was on the Trail of Tears that saw thousands of Indians forcefully removed from Eastern lands and moving to Oklahoma.

During the Civil War, the Battle of Island Number Ten took place on the Mississippi River near New Madrid.

In the antebellum period, this fertile floodplain area was developed for cotton plantations, based on the labor of enslaved African Americans. They were emancipated after the Civil War and worked to make new lives. As whites struggled to re-establish dominance after the Reconstruction era, they intimidated and attacked blacks under the guise of Jim Crow laws, working to suppress voting and control their activities.

Three African-American men are documented as being lynched by whites in New Madrid, the county seat, near the turn of the century: Unknown Negro, on November 29, 1898; Louis Wright, a musician in a minstrel show accused of altercations with whites, hanged on February 17, 1902; and unknown Negro, May 30, 1910.

By the turn of the 20th century, some industry was being developed in New Madrid, which contained two lumber mills, a grist mill, a stave and heading factory, and a cotton gin. It was considered a rough town. There were four Protestant churches, two with independent African-American congregations, and one Catholic church.

== Geography ==
According to the United States Census Bureau, the city has a total area of 4.53 square miles (11.73 km^{2}), of which 4.49 square miles (11.63 km^{2}) is land and 0.04 square miles (0.10 km^{2}) is water.

=== Climate ===
New Madrid has a humid subtropical climate (Köppen Cfa) with hot, humid summers and chilly, though not severe winters. Winter weather can vary from very mild and rainy when air masses from the Gulf of Mexico predominate, to very cold, dry and windy with northerly or northwesterly airflows as in the famous cold month of January 1977. On average there are 82 nights which fall to or below 32 °F or 0 °C, whilst one night falls to or below 0 °F or −17.8 °C, and the coldest temperature ever has been −14 °F or −25.6 °C on January 17, 1982. The hottest has been 107 °F or 41.7 °C record on August 4, 1964, whilst an average of 2.9 days exceed 100 °F or 37.8 °C.

Rainfall is fairly heavy throughout the year due to moist air from the Gulf being advected on the western side of the Bermuda High, plus occasional remnant depressions from hurricanes passing up the Mississippi Valley. Between 1963 and 2012, the wettest calendar year was 1990 with 71.24 inches or 1,809.5 millimetres and the driest 2005 with 32.36 inches or 821.9 millimetres. The wettest day was September 23, 2006 with 11.38 inches (289.1 mm) in one day, and September 2006 was also the wettest month with 15.27 inches (387.9 mm), whilst no precipitation fell during October 1964.

Snowfall is very rare, as it is normally too dry to snow when cold air masses reach the Bootheel, so that the median is only 0.4 inches or 0.010 metres per year and the mean just 5.7 inches or 0.14 metres. The most snow in one month was in January 1977 with 13.1 inches or 0.33 metres, whilst the snowiest season was from July 1966 to June 1967 with 19.3 inches or 0.49 metres.

Climate data for New Madrid, Missouri (1971-2000; extremes 1963 to 2012)
| Month | Jan | Feb | Mar | Apr | May | Jun | Jul | Aug | Sep | Oct | Nov | Dec | Year |
|---|---|---|---|---|---|---|---|---|---|---|---|---|---|
| Record high °F (°C) | 71 (22) | 77 (25) | 84 (29) | 94 (34) | 94 (34) | 104 (40) | 106 (41) | 107 (42) | 101 (38) | 92 (33) | 85 (29) | 74 (23) | 107 (42) |
| Mean daily maximum °F (°C) | 41.5 (5.3) | 47.5 (8.6) | 57.6 (14.2) | 68.6 (20.3) | 78.0 (25.6) | 86.9 (30.5) | 91.1 (32.8) | 89.4 (31.9) | 82.6 (28.1) | 71.7 (22.1) | 57.4 (14.1) | 46.0 (7.8) | 68.2 (20.1) |
| Mean daily minimum °F (°C) | 26 (−3) | 29 (−2) | 38 (3) | 48 (9) | 58 (14) | 66 (19) | 70 (21) | 68 (20) | 60 (16) | 48 (9) | 39 (4) | 29 (−2) | 48 (9) |
| Record low °F (°C) | −14 (−26) | −4 (−20) | 8 (−13) | 25 (−4) | 35 (2) | 47 (8) | 52 (11) | 42 (6) | 35 (2) | 25 (−4) | 12 (−11) | −11 (−24) | −14 (−26) |
| Average precipitation inches (mm) | 3.34 (85) | 3.72 (94) | 4.72 (120) | 5.23 (133) | 5.06 (129) | 4.21 (107) | 4.05 (103) | 2.62 (67) | 3.47 (88) | 3.65 (93) | 4.67 (119) | 4.69 (119) | 49.43 (1,257) |
| Average snowfall inches (cm) | 2.6 (6.6) | 2.1 (5.3) | 0.4 (1.0) | 0.0 (0.0) | 0.0 (0.0) | 0.0 (0.0) | 0.0 (0.0) | 0.0 (0.0) | 0.0 (0.0) | 0.0 (0.0) | trace | 0.6 (1.5) | 5.7 (14) |
| Average precipitation days (≥ 0.01 inch) | 9.5 | 8.1 | 10.8 | 10.1 | 10.9 | 8.8 | 8.2 | 6.2 | 7.1 | 7.5 | 9.4 | 9.9 | 106.5 |
| Average snowy days (≥ 0.1 inch) | 1.4 | 1.1 | 0.3 | 0.0 | 0.0 | 0.0 | 0.0 | 0.0 | 0.0 | 0.0 | 0.0 | 0.4 | 3.2 |
Source 1: National Oceanic and Atmospheric Administration
Source 2: National Weather Service Paducah

=== Coal pollution ===
The New Madrid coal plant owned by Associated Electric Cooperative Inc. was identified as one of 17 "deadliest coal plants in the US" by the Sierra Club, citing emissions and regional haze affecting neighboring communities. Sulfur dioxide pollution in the Bootheel has been found to exceed National Ambient Air Quality Standards. The plant was reopened in 2018 following the application of the first Trump tariffs.

=== Seismic zone ===
The city is located in a web of cracks at the center of the North American Plate dating from the Rodinian. New Madrid was the epicenter of the powerful 1811–1812 New Madrid earthquakes. In 2003, the U.S. Geological Survey predicted that another major earthquake will happen in New Madrid within the next 50 years, a theory that was rejected by the geophysicist Seth Stein in his 2010 book Disaster deferred: how new science is changing our view of earthquake hazards in the Midwest.

The city was hit by an earthquake on 28 February 2012 at 3:58 a.m. CST, measuring 4.0. However, the tremors created a media scare as the web made it easy for everyone to search the city's seismic history, and discover the 1811-1812 earthquakes and the city's sensitive seismic situation.

== Demographics ==
Historical population
| Census | Pop. | Note | %± |
|---|---|---|---|
| 1860 | 610 | | — |
| 1870 | 634 | | 3.9% |
| 1880 | 712 | | 12.3% |
| 1890 | 1,193 | | 67.6% |
| 1900 | 1,489 | | 24.8% |
| 1910 | 1,882 | | 26.4% |
| 1920 | 1,908 | | 1.4% |
| 1930 | 2,309 | | 21.0% |
| 1940 | 2,450 | | 6.1% |
| 1950 | 2,726 | | 11.3% |
| 1960 | 2,867 | | 5.2% |
| 1970 | 2,719 | | −5.2% |
| 1980 | 3,204 | | 17.8% |
| 1990 | 3,350 | | 4.6% |
| 2000 | 3,334 | | −0.5% |
| 2010 | 3,116 | | −6.5% |
| 2020 | 2,787 | | −10.6% |

By 1797, the total population was 615 (including 46 slaves).

=== 2020 census ===
As of the 2020 census, New Madrid had a population of 2,787 and 711 families in the city. The population density was 613.9 inhabitants per square mile (237.0/km^{2}). There were 1,352 housing units at an average density of 297.8 per square mile (115.0/km^{2}).

The median age was 42.3 years. 23.6% of residents were under the age of 18 and 21.2% of residents were 65 years of age or older. For every 100 females there were 90.6 males, and for every 100 females age 18 and over there were 86.5 males age 18 and over.

There were 1,210 households, of which 27.9% had children under the age of 18 living in them. Of all households, 34.7% were married-couple households, 21.7% were households with a male householder and no spouse or partner present, and 35.4% were households with a female householder and no spouse or partner present. About 36.6% of all households were made up of individuals and 18.6% had someone living alone who was 65 years of age or older. The average household size was 2.09 and the average family size was 2.73.

0.0% of residents lived in urban areas, while 100.0% lived in rural areas.

Of those housing units, 10.5% were vacant. The homeowner vacancy rate was 2.9% and the rental vacancy rate was 10.3%.

Racial composition as of the 2020 census
| Race | Number | Percent |
|---|---|---|
| White | 2,070 | 74.3% |
| Black or African American | 599 | 21.5% |
| American Indian and Alaska Native | 3 | 0.1% |
| Asian | 3 | 0.1% |
| Native Hawaiian and Other Pacific Islander | 0 | 0.0% |
| Some other race | 9 | 0.3% |
| Two or more races | 103 | 3.7% |
| Hispanic or Latino (of any race) | 29 | 1.0% |

=== Income and poverty ===
The median income for a household in the city was $41,445, and the median income for a family was $54,476. The per capita income for the city was $22,046. About 14.80% of families and 21.0% of the population were below the poverty line, including 32.6% of those under age 18 and 19.3% of those age 65 or over.

=== 2010 census ===
As of the 2010 United States census, there were 3,116 people, 1,276 households, and 809 families in the city. The population density was 694.0 inhabitants per square mile (268.0/km^{2}). There were 1,424 housing units at an average density of 317.1 per square mile (122.4/km^{2}). The racial makeup of the city was 72.30% White, 25.55% Black or African American, 0.22% Native American, 0.26% Asian, 0.13% from other races, and 1.54% from two or more races. Hispanic or Latino of any race were 0.80% of the population.

There were 1,276 households, of which 32.3% had children under the age of 18 living with them, 39.9% were married couples living together, 18.2% had a female householder with no husband present, 5.3% had a male householder with no wife present, and 36.6% were non-families. 32.4% of all households were made up of individuals, and 14% had someone living alone who was 65 years of age or older. The average household size was 2.34 and the average family size was 2.94.

The median age in the city was 39.8 years. 24.1% of residents were under the age of 18; 7.8% were between the ages of 18 and 24; 23.6% were from 25 to 44; 28.3% were from 45 to 64; and 16.1% were 65 years of age or older. The gender makeup of the city was 47.9% male and 52.1% female.

=== 2000 census ===
As of the 2000 United States census, there were 3,334 people, 1,275 households, and 882 families in the city. The population density was 738.3 inhabitants per square mile (285.1/km^{2}). There were 1,414 housing units at an average density of 313.1 per square mile (120.9/km^{2}). The racial makeup of the city was 72.56% White, 26.48% African American, 0.18% Native American, 0.30% Asian, 0.09% from other races, and 0.39% from two or more races. Hispanic or Latino of any race were 0.69% of the population.

There were 1,275 households, out of which 35.5% had children under the age of 18 living with them, 45.8% were married couples living together, 21.0% had a female householder with no husband present, and 30.8% were non-families. 28.4% of all households were made up of individuals, and 12.9% had someone living alone who was 65 years of age or older. The average household size was 2.47 and the average family size was 3.02.

The city's population contained 28.2% under the age of 18, 8.7% from 18 to 24, 26.0% from 25 to 44, 21.8% from 45 to 64, and 15.4% who were 65 years of age or older. The median age was 36 years. For every 100 females, there were 87.7 males. For every 100 females age 18 and over, there were 79.5 males.

The median income for a household in the city was $27,422, and the median income for a family was $34,464. Males had a median income of $30,705 versus $21,045 for females. The per capita income for the city was $14,639. About 22.6% of families and 25.0% of the population were below the poverty line, including 36.9% of those under age 18 and 17.5% of those age 65 or over.

== Education ==
It is in the New Madrid County R-I School District. New Madrid County R-I School District operates six schools in the New Madrid area, including Central High School.

New Madrid has a lending library, a branch of the New Madrid County Library.

Three Rivers College's service area includes New Madrid County.

== Government ==
The city of New Madrid is located in Missouri's 8th congressional district.

| Mayor | Took office | Left office | Additional information |
|---|---|---|---|
| Dr. Welton Neville O'Bannon Jr. | N/A | N/A | First Mayor of New Madrid. The O'Bannon Family Care Center obstetrics unit at Missouri Delta Medical Center in Sikeston, Missouri, bears the name of his son and wife as remembered from a donation from his grandson Welton Neville O'Bannon. (1854–1910) |
| Milton G. Hatcher | 1876 | 1878 | Physician and druggist born in Kentucky who served one term as mayor. (1840–1892) |
| John William Brownell | 1878 | 1885 | Brownell was mayor when the town was incorporated as a second-class city in 1878. He fought under Confederate General Sterling Price as a first lieutenant. (1841–1924) |
| N/A | 1885 | 1917 | |
| D. R. Hunter | 1917 | 1918 | |
| N/A | 1918 | 1937 | |
| Samuel Latham Hunter | 1937 | 1946 | (1880–1962); 1937 is approximate |
| Thomas F. Hunter | 1946 | 1958 | |
| Robert Riley Sr. | 1958 | 1960 | His terms as mayor included the construction of a new city hall and a new sewage lagoon and water treatment plant. (1915–2011) |
| O. W. Lewis | 1960 | 1962 | |
| Robert Riley Sr. | 1962 | 1974 | He previously served as mayor. (1915–2011) |
| James H. Cravens | 1974 | 1984 | |
| William R. "Dick" Phillips Jr. | 1984 | 1994 | Navy veteran, farmer, and agri-businessman who served 26 years as the mayor and an alderman and who helped lead the effort to pass the single-largest industrial bond issue for any community of any size up to that time. |
| Lawrence H. Rost | 1994 | 1996 | |
| Mark Baker | 1996 | 2004 | |
| Donnie Brown | 2004 | 2016 | |
| Richard "Dicky" Bodi | 2016 | 2022 | |
| Donnie Brown | 2022 | 2023 | |
| Kevin Lyons | 2023 | 2024 | |
| Nick White | 2024* | | |

Philip Raidt, who was born in Württemberg, Germany in 1825, helped to organize the first free school in New Madrid County. In April 1884, he was elected mayor of the city of New Madrid, but he did not serve. In the fall of 1884, he became a candidate for county judge and was elected to this position.

From 1937 to 1994, all mayors of New Madrid were affiliated with the democratic party.

== See also ==
- List of cities in Missouri
- 1865 Memphis earthquake
- List of New Madrid mayors
