= Three Rivers College (Missouri) =

Community college in Poplar Bluff, Missouri

- Type: Public community college
- Established: 1966
- President: Wesley Payne
- Undergraduates: 2,965 (fall 2019)
- Location: Poplar Bluff, Missouri, United States; 36°46′37″N 90°25′49″W
- Campus: Rural
- Colors: Black and Gold
- Nickname: Raiders
- Sporting affiliations: NJCAA – MCCAC
- Mascot: Rocky Raider
- Website: www.trcc.edu

Three Rivers College is a public community college in Poplar Bluff, Missouri. It was founded in 1966 when voters in the counties of Butler, Carter, Ripley, and Wayne approved the taxing district of Butler, Carter, Ripley, and Wayne counties.

Three Rivers is governed by a six-person board of trustees elected by residents in the college's taxing district. The college has an 80-acre (32.4 ha) campus in Poplar Bluff, Missouri with full-service locations in Dexter, Kennett, and Sikeston, and in-district locations in Doniphan, Caruthersville, Piedmont, Portageville, New Madrid, and Van Buren, and offers classes at various sites and high schools throughout the region. Three Rivers also participates in the Cape College Center alongside Mineral Area College and Southeast Missouri State University. The college is accredited by the Higher Learning Commission.

The college officially changed its name from Three Rivers Community College to Three Rivers College in 2017. It enrolled 2,604 students in the fallof 2024, down from 2,965 in 2019.

Aside from the main campus in Poplar Bluff, there are also campuses in Dexter, Kennett and Sikeston.

== Athletics ==
Three Rivers competes as a member of the NJCAA in the Missouri Community College Athletic Conference. Gene Bess, the men's basketball coach, has the most wins of any college basketball coach. The school's most famous athletic alumnus is Latrell Sprewell, who played basketball for Three Rivers before playing Division I basketball at Alabama.
