= Zeta, Missouri =

Zeta
- Ghost town
- The location of Zeta within Missouri
- Coordinates: 36°57′20.18″N 89°52′5.32″W
- Country: United States
- State: Missouri
- County: Stoddard County
- Elevation: 322 ft (98 m)

Zeta is a ghost town in Stoddard County, in the U.S. state of Missouri. It was named after the Greek letter zeta by George H. Crumb, who built a rail line between Zeta and Bloomfield.

== Development ==
The town was a stop along the St. Louis–San Francisco Railway within Richland Township, located near Aquilla and Durnell. It also was a stop along the "Cotton Belt Route", and had been a part of the defunct Missouri Southeastern Railway service between Zeta and Bloomfield. Additional rail lines existed between Zeta and Vanduser in neighboring Scott County.

Varying records indicate that a post office called Zeta was established in 1895 and potentially also in 1910, and remained in operation until 1936. Zeta also was home to multiple farms and sawmills.

== Current state ==
One of the few remnants of Zeta left is the Crowder-Zeta special road district; its name being shared with nearby Crowder. As of 2024, a Nestlé Purina PetCare factory is located immediately north of the historical location of Zeta, south of Missouri supplemental route Y, which was formerly and locally known as the "Zeta-Crowder road."

== Notable events ==
In 1916, a man from Zeta, Emil L. Gerardi, claimed to be a candidate for president in the 1916 United States presidential election.

On May 30, 1917, an F3 tornado touched down west of Acorn Ridge, Missouri and crossed through Zeta and Stoddard County, killing three people in Zeta.

On December 6, 1924, the Zeta rail depot was set on fire along with the depot in nearby Ardeola, which had completely burned down.
