= List of tornadoes in the outbreak of March 14–16, 2025 =

From March 14–16, 2025, a historic, widespread and deadly tornado outbreak took place across the Central United States.

== Confirmed tornadoes ==
Daily statistics
Date	Total	EFU	EF0	EF1	EF2	EF3	EF4	EF5	Deaths	Injuries
March 14	53	0	5	19	19	8	2	0	13	52+
March 15	50	0	11	23	12	3	1	0	11	30
March 16	15	0	4	11	0	0	0	0	0	0
Total	118	0	20	53	31	11	3	0	24	82+

=== March 14 event ===
List of confirmed tornadoes – Friday, March 14, 2025 (Note: All dates are based on the local time zone where the tornado touched down; however, all times are in Coordinated Universal Time for consistency.)
EF#	Location	County / Parish	State	Start Coord.	Time (UTC)	Path length	Max width
EF1	N of Seymour to ESE of Grovespring	Webster, Wright	MO	37.2°N 92.79°W	23:40–00:02	19.75 mi (31.78 km)	400 yd (370 m)
EF1	A roof was torn off a home, numerous barns were destroyed, a cell phone tower was collapsed, and numerous trees were snapped in a cyclonic pattern.						
EF1	NW of Lynchburg to WSW of Edgar Springs	Laclede, Texas, Pulaski	MO	37.5°N 92.34°W	00:12–00:36	22.26 mi (35.82 km)	200 yd (180 m)
EF1	An outbuilding was levelled and a home sustained minor roof damage.						
EF1	NE of Spring Creek to N of Vida	Phelps	MO	37.80°N 91.94°W	00:42–00:53	10.24 mi (16.48 km)	400 yd (370 m)
EF1	This high-end EF1 tornado caused severe damage to a barn, and tree damage was noted all along its track across northeastern Mark Twain National Forest. Its track was identified mostly through satellite imagery. It preceded the stronger Rolla EF2 tornado, listed below.						
EF2	SE of Doolittle to eastern Rolla	Phelps	MO	37.902°N 91.832°W	00:50–00:58	10.3 mi (16.6 km)	175 yd (160 m)
EF2	This strong tornado tracked through Phelps County, including Rolla, beginning in the Mark Twain National Forest. It uprooted and damaged trees along its intermittent path before striking areas along US 63 south of Rolla, where homes and businesses were damaged. In southeast Rolla, some homes sustained significant damage, while multiple schools and other businesses had roof damage. One person was injured in this area. Damage became more scattered in eastern Rolla, then weakened after crossing I-44, though a barn roof was damaged, more trees were uprooted, and a mobile home was shifted off its piers before the tornado lifted near the Little Prairie Conservation Area.						
EF1	Elmont to Union	Franklin	MO	38.23°N 91.242°W	01:29–01:52	19.8 mi (31.9 km)	100 yd (91 m)
EF1	This tornado touched down in Elmont, primarily damaging trees and a large barn before moving northeast through the Long Ridge Conservation Area. It caused its most significant damage near Route 47 south of Union, where several homes, outbuildings, and telephone poles were affected before the tornado dissipated.						
EF1	S of Kohl City to SW of Etlah	Franklin	MO	38.5799°N 91.3592°W	01:33–01:39	5.57 mi (8.96 km)	220 yd (200 m)
EF1	One outbuilding was destroyed, another one was damaged, and a home suffered roof damage. Trees also sustained damage, including some that were snapped or uprooted.						
EF3	Gamaliel, AR to Bakersfield, MO to E of West Plains, MO	Baxter (AR), Ozark (MO), Howell (MO)	AR, MO	36.4552°N 92.2359°W	01:34–02:16	35.74 mi (57.52 km)	1,200 yd (1,100 m)
EF3	3 deaths – See section on this tornado – Four people were injured.						
EF0	NE of Wilton	Muscatine, Cedar	IA	41.5977°N 90.9983°W	01:49–01:51	1.88 mi (3.03 km)	50 yd (46 m)
EF0	This high-end EF0 tornado caused damage to roofs, outbuildings, and trees.						
EF2	Eastern Villa Ridge to western Wildwood	Franklin, St. Louis	MO	38.4604°N 90.868°W	01:52–02:10	17.76 mi (28.58 km)	644 yd (589 m)
EF2	This strong tornado developed north of I-44 on the eastern side of Villa Ridge, quickly intensifying and severely damaging multiple homes at high-end EF2 strength with winds of 130 miles per hour (210 km/h). It continued northeast, damaging an industrial facility, causing significant tree damage, and knocking the top portion off a microwave tower before moving into St. Louis County. The tornado caused additional tree damage before dissipating near a bend in Route 100. One person was indirectly injured, and the tornado caused $6.5 million in damage.						
EF3	NNE of Brandsville to Fremont to SE of Ellington	Oregon, Shannon, Carter, Reynolds	MO	36.67°N 91.674°W	02:11–03:29	57.24 mi (92.12 km)	800 yd (730 m)
EF3	This long-tracked, high-end EF3 tornado began northeast of Brandsville in Oregon County and moved northeast, passing south of Rover where two homes were pushed off their foundations. It tore the roof from another, collapsed two high-voItage transmission line poles, and uprooted thousands of trees in the Mark Twain National Forest before entering Shannon County. In southeastern Shannon County, it uprooted hundreds of trees before intensifying in Carter County. There, hundreds more trees were snapped or uprooted, a few were debarked, and a stee barn was lofted several hundred yards. Several homes were completely destroyed near Fremont, with additional damage occurring in the northeastern of Carter County before crossing into Reynolds County. In southern Reynolds County, the tornado shattered the windows of a home and continued northeast, snapping and uprooting trees before lifting.						
EF4	NNE of Alco, AR to Fifty-Six, AR to NW of Harviell, MO	Stone (AR), Izard (AR), Sharp (AR), Randolph (AR), Ripley (MO), Butler (MO)	AR, MO	35.8935°N 92.3423°W	02:11–04:24	118.96 mi (191.45 km)	1,400 yd (1,300 m)
EF4	See article on this tornado – Four people were injured.						
EF2	Chesterfield to Bridgeton to Florissant	St. Louis	MO	38.6329°N 90.5875°W	02:16–02:39	20.67 mi (33.27 km)	880 yd (800 m)
EF2	Widespread damage to homes, outbuildings, power poles, and trees occurred, including some homes that had their roofs at least partially removed. The tornado also crossed a runway at the St. Louis Lambert International Airport.						
EF2	Morse Mill to Arnold to E of Mehlville	Jefferson, St. Louis	MO	38.2701°N 90.6488°W	02:18–02:39	25.33 mi (40.76 km)	850 yd (780 m)
EF2	Dozens of homes suffered roof and exterior wall damage, including some that had their roofs at least partially removed. Mobile homes and outbuildings were heavily damaged or destroyed and many trees were snapped or uprooted. A business in Arnold also suffered roof damage. The tornado then entered St. Louis County, where it caused more roof damage in Oakville, before dissipating east of the Jefferson Barracks National Cemetery.						
EF3	NE of Koshkonong to E of Greer	Oregon	MO	36.607°N 91.65°W	02:36–03:06	23.54 mi (37.88 km)	800 yd (730 m)
EF3	This intense tornado primarily caused damage to trees and several outbuildings along its path, but a ground-level home sustained EF3 damage north of Alton. As it moved northeast into the Mark Twain National Forest, satellite imagery revealed an intermittent track of uprooted trees extending to near the Eleven Point River at Turners Mill, where the tornado is presumed to have lifted.						
EF2	Old Jamestown, MO to western Alton, IL	St. Louis (MO), St. Charles (MO), Madison (IL)	MO, IL	38.8156°N 90.321°W	02:38–02:53	11.04 mi (17.77 km)	1,320 yd (1,210 m)
EF2	This large, strong tornado formed as the Chesterfield-Florissant EF2 tornado was dissipating and immediately caused damage to several homes. The tornado continued northeast, crossing the Missouri River and passing just northwest of West Alton, where it downed a metal truss tower. It then crossed the Mississippi River into Illinois, producing weak damage on the west side of Alton before dissipating.						
EF1	Valmeyer to NW of Floraville	Monroe, St. Clair	IL	38.2991°N 90.3107°W	02:52–03:10	14.67 mi (23.61 km)	275 yd (251 m)
EF1	Several houses had roof and siding damage in Valmeyer and Waterloo from this EF1 tornado.						
EF1	NW of Patmos	Hempstead	AR	33.5242°N 93.6464°W	03:09–03:28	8.58 mi (13.81 km)	525 yd (480 m)
EF1	This tornado initially caused tree damage and roofing damage to several homes as it moved northeast. It intensified near AR 29 where a camper and cattle trailer were thrown about 100 yd (91 m) and a mobile home was completely destroyed, injuring two residents. The tornado continued east-northeast, damaging another home's roof and uprooting trees before lifting.						
EF3	SW of Cushman to Cave City to N of Corning	Independence, Sharp, Lawrence, Randolph, Clay	AR	35.8395°N 91.7831°W	03:16–04:51	81.84 mi (131.71 km)	700 yd (640 m)
EF3	3 deaths – See article on this tornado – 20 people were injured.						
EF2	NNE of Gum Springs to S of Dover	Clark, Dallas, Hot Spring	AR	34.0729°N 93.0548°W	03:17–03:43	21.56 mi (34.70 km)	150 yd (140 m)
EF2	This strong tornado touched down near Gum Springs, causing mostly tree damage. However, a newly built shop near the community of Harrison was destroyed at mid-range EF2 intensity, before crossing into Hot Spring County, dissipating south of Dover.						
EF3	NNE of Garwood to Des Arc to N of Saco	Reynolds, Wayne, Iron, Madison	MO	37.1113°N 90.851°W	03:20–03:57	29.85 mi (48.04 km)	1,525 yd (1,394 m)
EF3	3 deaths — Several homes were heavily damaged or destroyed in Des Arc, including multiple poorly anchored homes that were leveled or shifted off their foundations. At least one business was also damaged, and many trees were snapped or uprooted. Four people were injured. Des Arc was struck by an EF2 tornado just two months later on May 16.						
EF1	Northeastern O'Fallon to S of St. Jacob	St. Clair, Madison	IL	38.6129°N 89.8779°W	03:28–03:33	6.81 mi (10.96 km)	450 yd (410 m)
EF1	This tornado caused severe damage in a trailer park shortly after touching down. Minor damage to trees and outbuildings occurred elsewhere along the path.						
EF3	NE of Eastwood to northern Leeper to S of Patterson	Carter, Wayne	MO	36.91°N 91.02°W	03:28–03:56	30.6 mi (49.2 km)	325 yd (297 m)
EF3	2 deaths – See section on this tornado						
EF1	Northern Bethesda	Independence	AR	35.7897°N 91.8407°W	03:28–03:32	3.61 mi (5.81 km)	100 yd (91 m)
EF1	This tornado touched down just to the east of the White River, where it caused minor roof damage to a house and destroyed a shed. The tornado continued off towards the northeast, passing mostly farmland before lifting.						
EF2	Mascoutah to eastern Trenton	St. Clair, Clinton	IL	38.4972°N 89.8071°W	03:33–03:38	11.01 mi (17.72 km)	700 yd (640 m)
EF2	This strong tornado began in Mascoutah, causing roof damage to multiple homes and a local school, along with damage to power poles and outbuildings. Moving northeast, it damaged a grain elevator and additional farm outbuildings. Near the Madison–Clinton county line, farm outbuildings were destroyed, and homes sustained heavy roof and window damage. After crossing into Clinton County, a home had significant roof damage, with more residential and outbuilding damage along the path. In eastern Trenton, most damage was limited to minor roof impacts, though one business had significant siding and air conditioning unit damage						
EF2	NW of Rosston to SE of Bluff City	Nevada, Ouachita	AR	33.62°N 93.3252°W	03:55–04:09	14.83 mi (23.87 km)	1,263 yd (1,155 m)
EF2	This low-end EF2 tornado touched down, causing tree damage and tearing roof panels off barns and outbuildings as it moved northeast. It intensified near AR 299, snapping and uprooting numerous trees, some of which fell on homes. The tornado continued east-northeast, causing additional tree damage before lifting in White Oak Lake State Park.						
EF1	SW of Hagarstown to northwestern Vandalia to NW of Brownstown	Fayette	IL	38.9324°N 89.188°W	04:11–04:23	13.39 mi (21.55 km)	400 yd (370 m)
EF1	This tornado moved through western Vandalia where EF0 damage occurred to trees and houses. EF1 damage occurred to the northeast, where several trees were uprooted.						
EF3	NW of Burbank to NE of Hurricane	Wayne, Madison, Bollinger	MO	37.16°N 90.39°W	04:15–04:40	28.64 mi (46.09 km)	500 yd (460 m)
EF3	1 death – This long-tracked, intense tornado began northeast near Greenville, causing extreme tree damage with thousands of trees snapped or uprooted. It struck the River Valley Campground near the Castor River, killing one person and severely injuring another. Near the campground, a home lost its roof and most exterior walls, several vehicles were thrown 50 ft (15 m) to 100 ft (30 m), and another home sustained heavy damage. Numerous outbuildings were destroyed, and a wooden power pole was snapped. In Bollinger County, thousands more trees were snapped or uprooted, two homes had major damage, over a dozen sustained minor damage, a barn lost its roof, and another wooden power pole was destroyed.						
EF4	W of Nuckles to SSW of Tuckerman	Independence, Jackson	AR	35.5705°N 91.4227°W	04:13–04:36	18.62 mi (29.97 km)	1,760 yd (1,610 m)
EF4	See section on this tornado – Two people were injured.						
EF2	NW of Belzoni to E of Greenwood	Humphreys, Leflore, Holmes, Carroll	MS	33.2106°N 90.5327°W	04:14–05:07	35.2 mi (56.6 km)	1,320 yd (1,210 m)
EF2	This long-tracked, large, strong tornado began northwest of Belzoni, snapping power poles and damaging a home before continuing northeast, where it caused additional tree damage and damaged a trailer. As it moved through Mayday, it snapped more power poles and damaged a metal building before crossing the Yazoo River and destroying multiple mobile homes south of Greenwood. Several well-built homes sustained roof damage, trees were uprooted, and a tree was blown onto a home. The tornado continued causing structural and tree damage before dissipating.						
EF2	SW of Precinct, MO to eastern Perryville, MO to Leanderville, IL	Bollinger (MO), Perry (MO), Randolph (IL)	MO, IL	37.5423°N 90.0433°W	04:25–04:55	33.11 mi (53.29 km)	800 yd (730 m)
EF2	This long-tracked, strong tornado moved northeast through Bollinger County, destroying a carport and shed, tearing the roof off a barn along Route 51, and causing widespread tree damage. It continued toward Perryville, damaging trees and barns before producing EF2 damage to several homes. At the Perryville Middle and High School complex, three buildings were damaged, including one with exterior walls on the top floor knocked in and two with extensive roof damage. Two nearby houses lost large portions of their roofs. As it moved northeast out of town toward the Mississippi River, it caused additional significant roof damage to homes, damaged several barns, and downed more trees. The tornado crossed the Mississippi River into Illinois, where most damage was to trees, though a few outbuildings sustained significant roof damage. The tornado dissipated in Leanderville.						
EF3	WNW of Harviell to northern Poplar Bluff to NW of Rombauer	Butler	MO	36.7229°N 90.5729°W	04:27–04:47	17.92 mi (28.84 km)	350 yd (320 m)
EF3	1 death – See section on this tornado – 3 people were injured.						
EF0	Southern Yorkville	Kendall	IL	41.6148°N 88.4439°W	04:39–04:43	3.64 mi (5.86 km)	125 yd (114 m)
EF0	This tornado touched down near IL 47 in Yorkville, damaging homes by removing shingles, siding, fascia trim, and heavily damaging a fence. It continued east-northeast, causing additional tree and roof damage before dissipating, with straight-line winds continuing beyond its path.						
EF1	E of Wright	Jefferson	AR	34.43°N 92.01°W	04:43–04:46	0.87 mi (1.40 km)	50 yd (46 m)
EF1	This brief tornado in northern Jefferson County damaged trees, destroyed a mobile home, and damaged a few outbuildings before dissipating.						
EF1	SE of Stewardson	Shelby	IL	39.23°N 88.65°W	04:47–04:52	5.1 mi (8.2 km)	75 yd (69 m)
EF1	As it touched down, this tornado uprooted a hardwood tree and peeled off part of a farm building's roof. It then moved northeast, collapsing the walls of a large farm building and scattering debris nearly a mile away before damaging another small farm building and uprooting trees on a nearby property.						
EF1	NNE of Rombauer to Puxico	Stoddard	MO	36.9094°N 90.2493°W	04:50–04:57	6.12 mi (9.85 km)	25 yd (23 m)
EF1	An outbuilding was severely damaged southwest of Puxico. The tornado then moved through town, damaging the roofs, fascia, and gutters of a few homes.						
EF1	N of Strasburg to S of Windsor	Shelby	IL	39.38°N 88.61°W	04:50–04:52	2.33 mi (3.75 km)	100 yd (91 m)
EF1	Two grain bins and a small shed were destroyed, and a 52x76-foot pole barn was tossed. Multiple trees and over half a dozen power poles were snapped.						
EF2	N of Augusta to WSW of Tupelo	Woodruff	AR	35.336°N 91.3679°W	04:50–04:55	5.09 mi (8.19 km)	200 yd (180 m)
EF2	This strong, fast-moving tornado began southwest of AR 33, causing tree damage and severely damaging a barn. It continued northeast, damaging wooden power lines near Fitzhugh and primarily affecting trees along its path before dissipating.						
EF2	E of Knobel to SW of McDougal	Clay	AR	36.3207°N 90.5793°W	04:53–05:02	9.88 mi (15.90 km)	125 yd (114 m)
EF2	This significant tornado developed east of Knobel, snapping power poles along AR 90 before intensifying near the Walnut Grove community. It destroyed several outbuildings, snapped multiple wooden power poles along AR 135, and overturned heavy farm machinery. The tornado gradually weakened as it moved northeast, causing sporadic tree damage before lifting.						
EF1	W of Lovington to SW of Hammond	Moultrie	IL	39.72°N 88.68°W	04:57–05:03	4.92 mi (7.92 km)	150 yd (140 m)
EF1	Two outbuildings were destroyed, and trees and power lines were downed.						
EF2	Hammond to SSW of Ivesdale	Moultrie, Piatt	IL	39.75°N 88.61°W	05:01–05:14	12.56 mi (20.21 km)	150 yd (140 m)
EF2	This low-end EF2 tornado touched down near US 36 south of Hammond before moving into town, damaging numerous trees and buildings. Its peak intensity occurred just north of town, where a farm outbuilding was destroyed, debris was scattered, and a cell tower was blown down before the tornado continued northeast, damaging additional outbuildings.						
EF0	NW of Bono	Craighead	AR	35.9239°N 90.8564°W	05:03–05:05	1.4 mi (2.3 km)	50 yd (46 m)
EF0	This weak tornado caused some tree damage and snapped a pole.						
EF2	Eastern Neoga to NW of Lerna	Cumberland, Coles	IL	39.31°N 88.44°W	05:03–05:18	12.88 mi (20.73 km)	300 yd (270 m)
EF2	In Neoga, this tornado damaged the roof of a home along with two schools. Moving northeastward, it then damaged a grain bin and scattered the debris in a field as it crossed I-57 at the US 45 exit. Two semi-truckers on the interstate were injured. After snapping power poles and damaging the roof of an outbuilding, the tornado strengthened to EF2 intensity and destroyed seven grain bins and snapped more power poles, scattering the debris to the northeast. It then caused some additional tree and power pole damage before dissipating.						
EF1	N of Redd to Aid to ENE of Acorn Ridge	Stoddard	MO	36.8759°N 90.0479°W	05:05–05:10	4.62 mi (7.44 km)	50 yd (46 m)
EF1	This tornado impacted Aid, damaging the roof and entrance of a church and destroying or damaging several farm outbuildings along its path. The tornado lifted shortly after crossing into open farmland.						
EF0	Eastern Bartlett to Hanover Park	DuPage	IL	41.9757°N 88.1547°W	05:05–05:06	0.78 mi (1.26 km)	50 yd (46 m)
EF0	This brief, weak tornado caused mainly tree and fence damage; it also caused slight roof damage to homes.						
EF1	SW of Dorans	Coles	IL	39.535°N 88.38°W	05:10–05:11	0.6 mi (0.97 km)	75 yd (69 m)
EF1	Eleven power poles were snapped.						
EF2	NNW of Vergennes to St. Johns to ENE of Sunfield	Jackson, Perry	IL	37.9183°N 89.3612°W	05:10–05:23	15.16 mi (24.40 km)	250 yd (230 m)
EF2	This strong tornado began in Jackson County before quickly moving into Perry County, damaging around 50 homes across the county and leaving five uninhabitable in the St. Johns community. It collapsed a metal building in an industrial park in western Du Quoin, broke numerous wooden power poles, and caused significant tree damage. The tornado blew out windows of a historic church, toppled gravestones in a cemetery, and snapped tree trunks before dissipating.						
EF2	SSW of Walcott to Paragould	Craighead, Greene	AR	35.9601°N 90.6996°W	05:16–05:34	13.76 mi (22.14 km)	150 yd (140 m)
EF2	This strong tornado touched down in northern Craighead County, snapping and uprooting trees while also doing minor damage to a few homes. The tornado then moved through inaccessible dense forest, with some tree damage discovered via high-resolution satellite imagery. The tornado then exited the forest and began uprooting trees before intensifying and causing significant roof damage in the Club View Estates and The Enclave neighborhoods to the southwest of Paragould. Several homes suffered major structural damage, including collapsed walls and missing second floors, with additional homes losing roofs and experiencing brick damage as the tornado moved northeast. It continued through the western portion of Paragould, causing tree damage and minor damage to an assisted living building before crossing US 49/AR 1 and intensifying. The tornado caused further home and tree damage before damaging multiple metal buildings near US 412B before dissipating. Four people were injured.						
EF2	E of Bell City to W of Oran	Stoddard, Scott	MO	37.0264°N 89.7649°W	05:17–05:25	6.43 mi (10.35 km)	100 yd (91 m)
EF2	This low-end EF2 tornado caused roof damage to two homes, destroyed multiple outbuildings, and snapped several power poles as it moved northeast. It continued through open fields, flipping irrigation pivots and damaging grain silos and shops before dissipating.						
EF2	N of North Carrollton to Elliott to N of Gore Springs	Carroll, Montgomery, Grenada	MS	33.5642°N 89.9216°W	05:18–05:53	24.41 mi (39.28 km)	880 yd (800 m)
EF2	This high-end EF2 tornado began by damaging softwood trees before intensifying as it moved northeast, causing roof damage to a home and snapping numerous trees. As it crossed MS 17, the tornado grew in size and strength, snapping power poles and trees while damaging another home's roof. It continued northeast, overturning a tractor-trailer on I-55, destroying a tractor shed, and throwing a truck 30 yd (27 m). Entering Montgomery County, it caused more roof and tree damage before reaching Grenada County, where it destroyed a mobile home and heavily damaged a house and a large metal building in Elliott. The tornado continued northeast, snapping trees and power poles as it crossed multiple roads before finally lifting. Three people were injured.						
EF0	N of Waldenburg	Poinsett	AR	35.6178°N 90.9493°W	05:23–05:26	2.82 mi (4.54 km)	50 yd (46 m)
EF0	This weak tornado caused mainly mild tree damage, though a part of the path could not be accessed.						
EF1	W of Sellers to N of Gifford	Champaign	IL	40.18°N 88.11°W	05:40–05:52	13.72 mi (22.08 km)	150 yd (140 m)
EF1	The tornado touched down west of Sellars, primarily causing tree damage before damaging several outbuildings along its path. As it moved north-northeast, it caused shingle damage to multiple homes on the northwest edge of Gifford before lifting in a forest preserve.						
EF1	Southeastern Paris	Edgar	IL	39.58°N 87.71°W	05:50–05:55	6.44 mi (10.36 km)	425 yd (389 m)
EF1	This tornado touched down and immediately leveled an outbuilding and snapped a tree, which fell onto a home. The tornado then proceeded toward the southeast part of Paris, where it damaged several homes, mobile homes, and trees. It continued northeast, producing periodic damage before it dissipated on the north side of a country club.						
EF2	N of Senath to Kennett to WSW of Homestown	Dunklin, Pemiscot	MO	36.1837°N 90.1626°W	05:56–06:21	19.42 mi (31.25 km)	550 yd (500 m)
EF2	This strong tornado began along Route A, overturning irrigation pivots, downing power poles, and snapping trees southwest of Kennett. It caused roof damage to multiple homes and businesses north of US 412, with additional damage to power poles and a motel near the intersection of US 412 and Route 25. As it moved northeast, more irrigation pivots were overturned, a small barn was destroyed, and windows were blown out of a home. The tornado then intensified again, snapping multiple concrete electrical poles before continuing northeast and eventually lifting near Homestown.						

=== March 15 event ===
List of confirmed tornadoes – Saturday, March 15, 2025
EF#	Location	County / Parish	State	Start Coord.	Time (UTC)	Path length	Max width
EF1	E of Morehouse to southern Sikeston	New Madrid	MO	36.8366°N 89.6383°W	06:03–06:07	4.51 mi (7.26 km)	50 yd (46 m)
EF1	This tornado touched down southwest of Sikeston, damaging barns and downing power poles before moving east-northeast into town. It caused roof damage to apartment buildings, a shopping center, a fast-food restaurant, and a nursing home near US 61. The tornado then damaged several homes before dissipating on the southeastern side of town. The tornado's track was just south of a low-end EF3 tornado that struck Sikeston in May 2024.						
EF1	Western Cedar Lake	Lake	IN	41.3698°N 87.4715°W	06:12–06:13	0.93 mi (1.50 km)	200 yd (180 m)
EF1	This low-end EF1 tornado moved through western portions of Cedar Lake, uprooting trees, damaging homes, and ripping part of a roof off a two-story house. It continued north, causing additional tree damage before dissipating, with a trampoline found wrapped around a telephone pole along its path.						
EF1	Mecca	Parke	IN	39.7563°N 87.3108°W	06:14–06:16	2.66 mi (4.28 km)	75 yd (69 m)
EF1	This high-end EF1 tornado began west of Mecca, causing sporadic tree damage in rural wood and farmland. It later completely destroyed a small garage and mostly destroyed a 150-year-old barn. It continued to cause tree and pole building damage before moving onto rural farmland and dissipating shortly thereafter.						
EF2	W of Vienna to Bloomfield to ESE of New Burnside	Johnson	IL	37.4075°N 88.9443°W	06:15–06:31	15.63 mi (25.15 km)	150 yd (140 m)
EF2	This low-end EF2 tornado began west of Vienna, damaging homes and outbuildings and uprooting trees as it crossed IL 146. It intensified near US 45 and I-24, nearly destroying manufactured homes and breaking wooden power poles before continuing northeast, causing additional roof and tree damage. The tornado weakened east of Ozark before lifting near the Johnson-Pope county line.						
EF0	Eastern Schererville to northern Merrillville	Lake	IN	41.4693°N 87.4173°W	06:19–06:24	4.94 mi (7.95 km)	200 yd (180 m)
EF0	Trees were uprooted, and minor roof damage was inflicted to homes.						
EF1	E of Derma to Vardaman to NNW of Pyland	Calhoun, Chickasaw	MS	33.8505°N 89.2494°W	06:25–06:38	8.19 mi (13.18 km)	300 yd (270 m)
EF1	This tornado touched down and rapidly intensified, uprooting trees and causing minor roof and outbuilding damage along MS 8. As it moved through Vardaman, it uprooted trees, damaged roofs, and tore the metal roof off an elementary school building. The tornado continued into Chickasaw County, snapping more trees before lifting.						
EF2	E of Fort Branch to Oakland City to SSW of Indian Springs	Gibson, Pike, Daviess, Martin	IN	38.2103°N 87.5483°W	07:53–08:44	57.49 mi (92.52 km)	400 yd (370 m)
EF2	This long-tracked tornado first touched down southwest of Oakland City before moving northeastward through the city. Along the beginning portion of the path, several mobile homes and outbuildings were heavily damaged or destroyed, and trees and power poles were snapped. A gas station canopy was also damaged. The tornado then continued northeastward and passed just east of Algiers, causing minor damage to homes and downing electrical transmission lines. The tornado continued northeast, causing minor damage to outbuildings, a home, and trees before crossing the East Fork White River into Daviess County. A farm sustained the most significant damage of the tornado, with winds around 100 mph (160 km/h) damaging metal outbuildings, throwing a 2x4 through the windshield of a semi-truck, and completely destroying and tearing apart two large grain bins and throwing their debris at least a mile northeast.						
EF1	West Baden Springs to Orleans	Orange	IN	38.5632°N 86.6092°W	08:45–08:53	11.02 mi (17.73 km)	50 yd (46 m)
EF1	This high-end EF1 tornado touched down in West Baden Springs, snapping trees, downing power lines, and causing minor home damage before moving northeast. It intensified east of town, causing extensive roof damage to a residence, flipping an unanchored mobile home, and collapsing a metal barn. The tornado continued through rural Orange County and a portion of the Hoosier National Forest, damaging homes, barns, trees, and completely destroying a pole barn garage. It then moved into Orleans, snapping trees, damaging a church roof, and tearing the roof off a pole barn residence before lifting.						
EF0	SW of Silverville to W of Oolitic	Lawrence	IN	38.8499°N 86.6756°W	08:53–08:59	6.24 mi (10.04 km)	100 yd (91 m)
EF0	This weak, intermittent tornado caused sporadic damage, destroying an old shed, damaging a barn roof, and uprooting trees.						
EF0	ENE of Avoca to Needmore	Lawrence	IN	38.9133°N 86.5386°W	09:01–09:02	0.97 mi (1.56 km)	25 yd (23 m)
EF0	This short-lived tornado caused significant damage, destroying a shed, damaging a home's porch and roof, and partially blowing out a garage's cinder block foundation.						
EF1	SSE of Brownstown	Jackson	IN	38.8033°N 86.0297°W	09:14–09:17	2.22 mi (3.57 km)	50 yd (46 m)
EF1	A mobile home had its roof torn off, and its walls collapsed.						
EF0	NE of Saulsbury to NW of Middleton	Hardeman	TN	35.0966°N 89.0021°W	12:56–13:02	2.67 mi (4.30 km)	50 yd (46 m)
EF0	Minor tree damage occurred.						
EF2	N of Mayersville to E of Delta City	Issaquena, Sharkey	MS	32.9205°N 91.0464°W	15:22–15:49	19.8 mi (31.9 km)	1,580 yd (1,440 m)
EF2	This large tornado began near the Mississippi River north of Mayersville, snapping trees and power poles and damaging a home's roof. It intensified as it moved northeast, destroying a mobile home, leveling a barn, and overturning farm pivots. Near Grace, it caused the most severe damage, collapsing the second story of a home, removing roofs, and snapping dozens of power poles. The tornado continued toward Nitta Yuma and Delta City, causing sporadic tree and structural damage before dissipating.						
EF4	NE of Kentwood, LA to Carson, MS	Tangipahoa (LA), Pike (MS), Walthall (MS), Marion (MS), Jefferson Davis (MS), Covington (MS)	LA, MS	30.9576°N 90.4667°W	17:17–18:39	67.16 mi (108.08 km)	1,400 yd (1,300 m)
EF4	6 deaths – See article on this tornado – 14 people were injured.						
EF1	NNW of Van Vleet	Chickasaw	MS	33.9857°N 88.917°W	17:27–17:33	2.96 mi (4.76 km)	150 yd (140 m)
EF1	This tornado began on MS 32, causing a car to spin off the state highway. The tornado then moved northeast through a heavily forested area, snapping pine trees and downing power lines before lifting.						
EF0	Eastern Mendenhall	Simpson	MS	31.9618°N 89.8603°W	17:47–17:48	0.41 mi (0.66 km)	100 yd (91 m)
EF0	A weak tornado downed several pine trees near a church and caused minor damage to fencing and vegetation.						
EF0	NE of New Wren	Monroe	MS	33.9719°N 88.5998°W	18:16–18:18	2.01 mi (3.23 km)	50 yd (46 m)
EF0	Minor tree damage was noted.						
EF3	SW of Tylertown to W of Goss	Walthall, Marion	MS	31.1161°N 90.1937°W	18:24–18:54	26.05 mi (41.92 km)	880 yd (800 m)
EF3	1 death – See section on this tornado – Two people were injured.						
EF0	S of Newton	Newton	MS	32.2767°N 89.1952°W	18:32–18:36	3.5 mi (5.6 km)	75 yd (69 m)
EF0	This weak tornado uprooted trees and downed tree limbs. A house sustained minor damage to its exterior.						
EF1	NE of Newton	Newton	MS	32.3532°N 89.0895°W	18:41–18:51	6.7 mi (10.8 km)	300 yd (270 m)
EF1	Several trees were snapped or uprooted. Two homes and a carport sustained generally minor structural damage.						
EF2	NNE of Collins to NE of Taylorsville	Covington, Smith	MS	31.711°N 89.5121°W	18:54–19:17	16.3 mi (26.2 km)	750 yd (690 m)
EF2	This strong tornado touched down west of Hopewell, damaging trees, homes, and destroying a barn before moving northeast, where it destroyed multiple mobile homes along its path. Near Hot Coffee, several mobile homes were completely destroyed, including one thrown into a ravine, though parked vehicles nearby remained mostly unmoved. The tornado continued through rural areas, flattening forests and removing the roof from a brick home before severely impacting a mobile home community where most residents had evacuated due to warnings. It then moved into Smith County, where a couple unintentionally rode out the storm in their vehicle as their home lost part of its roof and a wall. The tornado caused widespread damage in Taylorsville, destroying homes, businesses, and a high school sports complex before weakening and dissipating. Eleven people were injured.						
EF2	NNE of Bassfield to W of Collins	Jefferson Davis, Covington	MS	31.5225°N 89.7298°W	19:11–19:30	12.7 mi (20.4 km)	600 yd (550 m)
EF2	This strong tornado caused widespread tree damage as it moved northeast through eastern Jefferson Davis County. It destroyed multiple commercial chicken houses and damaged buildings at a Methodist Church complex in Covington County. It also crossed the end of the damage path of the long-tracked EF4 tornado. The tornado continued downing trees and causing light to moderate damage to homes and outbuildings before dissipating.						
EF1	S of Lexington	Lauderdale	AL	34.9439°N 87.3985°W	19:21–19:25	2.29 mi (3.69 km)	63 yd (58 m)
EF1	This tornado touched down in a field before moving northeast, damaging a two-car garage, shifting it off its foundation, and snapping several large cedar trees. It continued uprooting trees, damaging fences, and destroying an outdoor metal shed, scattering debris across multiple properties. The tornado also caused roof damage to a home, damaged a vehicle, and continued snapping and uprooting trees before lifting.						
EF1	E of Montrose	Jasper	MS	32.0939°N 89.1908°W	19:38–19:50	6.8 mi (10.9 km)	300 yd (270 m)
EF1	This tornado damaged trees.						
EF2	SSE of Bassfield to N of Seminary	Marion, Jefferson Davis, Covington	MS	31.4°N 89.6829°W	20:03–20:24	18.3 mi (29.5 km)	880 yd (800 m)
EF2	1 death – This large, high-end EF2 tornado began in northeastern Marion county, snapping trees, damaging a home, and destroying a barn before intensifying as it entered Jefferson Davis county, where two mobile homes were destroyed. It remained strong as it moved through the Melba community, damaging additional homes and destroying another mobile home before rolling an RV in southern Covington county. The tornado caused significant roof damage to multiple homes and damaged several outbuildings before reaching US 49, where two mobile homes were destroyed, resulting in one fatality and one additional injury. A community center sustained roof damage before the tornado weakened and lifted near Okatoma Creek.						
EF1	SE of Pleasant Ridge to ESE of Gordo	Greene, Pickens, Tuscaloosa	AL	32.9887°N 88.07°W	20:08–20:43	26.46 mi (42.58 km)	1,200 yd (1,100 m)
EF1	This large, long-tracked, low-end EF1 tornado touched down in Greene County, initially causing tree damage and impacting a mobile home. It continued northeast, uprooting and snapping numerous trees as it passed through rural areas and into Pickens County, where it re-intensified and caused more concentrated tree damage. The tornado then crossed into Tuscaloosa County, bringing down additional trees before weakening and lifting just west of its final location.						
EF1	ESE of Eagleville to NW of Bell Buckle	Bedford, Rutherford	TN	35.6716°N 86.5328°W	20:22–20:26	4.48 mi (7.21 km)	300 yd (270 m)
EF1	This tornado touched down in northwest Bedford County, damaging or destroying several outbuildings and barns before causing minor home damage as it moved east-northeast. It continued into southwestern Rutherford County, downing trees and damaging additional outbuildings before lifting just west of US 231.						
EF1	NNE of Seminary	Covington, Jones	MS	31.6358°N 89.446°W	20:27–20:36	6.8 mi (10.9 km)	400 yd (370 m)
EF1	Several trees were snapped or uprooted.						
EF1	N of Soso	Jasper	MS	31.8121°N 89.2699°W	20:46–20:49	2.5 mi (4.0 km)	300 yd (270 m)
EF1	Several trees were snapped or uprooted.						
EF1	N of Northport to SE of Windham Springs	Tuscaloosa	AL	33.3475°N 87.6089°W	21:00–21:14	11.54 mi (18.57 km)	600 yd (550 m)
EF1	This tornado touched down near a metal building that lost part of its roof, then moved across Lake Tuscaloosa and into a residential area where multiple trees were snapped or uprooted. The most significant damage occurred where numerous pine trees were downed, some falling onto structures. The tornado weakened as it continued northeast and lifted in a wooded area.						
EF2	Paulding to NW of Wautubbee	Jasper, Clarke	MS	32.0196°N 89.0554°W	21:09–21:28	13 mi (21 km)	300 yd (270 m)
EF2	This strong tornado began southwest of Paulding, causing tree damage and peeling tin off a porch cover before crossing MS 503, where it snapped trees and damaged a shed and home. As it moved northeast into the Lake Eddins area, it caused its most significant damage, snapping numerous trees, destroying a four-car garage, collapsing a boathouse, and damaging several home roofs. The tornado weakened as it continued northeast, snapping large tree limbs and causing sporadic tree damage as it crossed into Clarke County. It continued causing sporadic tree damage as it crossed I-59 before dissipating.						
EF2	S of Windham Springs to southern Cordova to NNW of Empire	Tuscaloosa, Walker	AL	33.4571°N 87.5051°W	21:12–21:55	39.48 mi (63.54 km)	1,000 yd (910 m)
EF2	This large, long-tracked tornado touched down as the Northport EF1 tornado was dissipating. It first inflicted light tree damage and minor structural impacts to a small farm building. As it moved northeast, it caused increasing damage in parts of Walker County, including uprooted trees, roof damage to homes, and broken windows. The most serious and widespread damage occurred near Sipsey, where numerous trees were snapped, homes were damaged or lost portions of their roofs, and a mobile home was destroyed. The tornado then weakened gradually before lifting just south of the Cullman County line. The track of this tornado closely followed the EF3 and EF4 tornadoes that moved through Cordova on April 27, 2011.						
EF1	SW of Madisonville to SE of Covington	St. Tammany	LA	30.3816°N 90.1689°W	21:17–21:28	7.55 mi (12.15 km)	20 yd (18 m)
EF1	A waterspout developed over Lake Pontchartrain before moving ashore near Madisonville. It mainly produced tree damage along its path, dropping tree limbs onto homes and crossing the Bogue Falaya River three times.						
EF2	ENE of Aliceville to NNE of Gordo	Pickens	AL	33.1499°N 88.0569°W	21:32–21:58	21.56 mi (34.70 km)	950 yd (870 m)
EF2	This large, low-end EF2 tornado began in a wooded area and quickly intensified, snapping numerous trees as it moved northeast. Several chicken houses were destroyed, a manufactured home was ripped off its anchoring, and widespread damage continued as it tracked through mostly rural land. Several homes sustained significant roof damage along the path as well. The tornado gradually weakened and lifted after causing additional structural and tree damage near the end of its track.						
EF1	E of Enterprise to SE of Meridian	Clarke, Lauderdale	MS	32.176°N 88.7745°W	21:33–21:51	13.4 mi (21.6 km)	400 yd (370 m)
EF1	This tornado touched down on MS 514, uprooting softwood trees and damaging the roofs of several homes, a light post, and a shed. As it moved northeast, it rolled a mobile home onto its roof, causing heavy damage, and inflicted minor roof damage to a nearby home while snapping more trees. The tornado weakened as it continued, causing minor tree damage before crossing into Lauderdale County where it damaged more home roofs and continued uprooting trees. It caused additional roof damage before dissipating shortly after.						
EF2	NW of Bellamy	Sumter	AL	32.4847°N 88.2078°W	22:20–22:26	3.32 mi (5.34 km)	650 yd (590 m)
EF2	Hundreds of trees were snapped by this strong tornado that remained over forested areas.						
EF0	E of Gallion to S of Morgan Springs	Hale, Perry	AL	32.4976°N 87.6612°W	23:39–00:05	21.61 mi (34.78 km)	700 yd (640 m)
EF0	This weak tornado snapped or uprooted trees.						
EF0	N of Active to S of Brierfield	Bibb	AL	32.9063°N 86.9776°W	00:39–00:54	7.63 mi (12.28 km)	75 yd (69 m)
EF0	Trees were snapped.						
EF1	Calera	Chilton, Shelby	AL	33.066°N 86.7608°W	00:57–01:11	7.47 mi (12.02 km)	250 yd (230 m)
EF1	This tornado moved through much of Calera, primarily damaging trees. It also damaged several mobile homes, rolled or tossed campers at a dealership near US 31 and I-65, and then weakened before lifting near a limestone quarry.						
EF1	Eastern Montevallo	Shelby	AL	33.0875°N 86.8291°W	01:00–01:07	2.55 mi (4.10 km)	150 yd (140 m)
EF1	Several trees were snapped or uprooted.						
EF1	ENE of Citronelle	Mobile, Washington	AL	31.1139°N 88.1775°W	01:20–01:30	6.26 mi (10.07 km)	200 yd (180 m)
EF1	This EF1 tornado caused tree damage near its touchdown point and likely reached peak intensity and width while moving through a forested area where satellite imagery showed extensive tree snaps and uproots. It weakened as it approached an outbuilding that lost its roof and walls, then continued causing additional tree damage before lifting.						
EF2	Winterboro to S of Mardisville	Talladega	AL	33.3194°N 86.2005°W	01:42–01:49	3.63 mi (5.84 km)	500 yd (460 m)
EF2	1 death — This strong tornado touched down near Winterboro High School, damaging sports facilities before intensifying and lifting a school bus into the school's gymnasium, causing significant structural collapse. It continued northeast, snapping trees, damaging homes, and destroying a single-wide manufactured home, resulting in a fatality and an injury. The tornado weakened as it moved further northeast, causing minor roof damage to homes and outbuildings before lifting.						
EF1	S of Carlton to SSW of Gainestown	Clarke, Monroe	AL	31.2915°N 87.861°W	01:48–02:05	13.9 mi (22.4 km)	240 yd (220 m)
EF1	This tornado began south of Carlton, where high-resolution satellite imagery revealed its peak intensity as it wiped out a large portion of forest. It continued northeast with a narrow but continuous path of tree damage, mostly in the form of snapped and uprooted treetops, particularly along the Alabama River. One building sustained damage, where part of its metal roof was removed.						
EF3	S of Plantersville to western Clanton	Dallas, Autauga, Chilton	AL	32.5971°N 86.9377°W	01:50–02:20	24.33 mi (39.16 km)	1,000 yd (910 m)
EF3	2 deaths – See section on this tornado – 2 people were injured.						
EF0	NE of Barlow Bend	Clarke	AL	31.4673°N 87.6035°W	02:10–02:11	1.43 mi (2.30 km)	200 yd (180 m)
EF0	A tornado path was identified through high-resolution satellite imagery in May 2025, revealing continuous tree damage. The tornado primarily snapped or uprooted trees.						
EF1	NW of Dollar to ESE of Weogufka	Coosa	AL	32.909°N 86.4495°W	02:33–02:50	12.02 mi (19.34 km)	200 yd (180 m)
EF1	A double-wide manufactured home and farm outbuildings were destroyed. Numerous trees were snapped or uprooted.						
EF1	W of Sudie to eastern Dallas to S of Roxana	Paulding	GA	33.856°N 84.876°W	03:41–03:53	11.64 mi (18.73 km)	200 yd (180 m)
EF1	This high-end EF1 tornado touched down in central Paulding County, initially downing trees and destroying an outbuilding near Pace Creek Lake. It intensified as it moved northeast, causing tree and power line damage, toppling trees onto homes, and damaging a gas station and grocery store roof near US 278. The tornado continued through New Hope, uprooting trees, destroying a shed, and damaging multiple homes before weakening and lifting. In total, approximately 15 structures were damaged along its path.						
EF3	W of Jackson's Gap to Daviston	Tallapoosa	AL	32.8695°N 85.8778°W	03:48–04:12	20.45 mi (32.91 km)	800 yd (730 m)
EF3	See section on this tornado.						
EF2	S of Troy to W of Perote	Pike, Bullock	AL	31.7383°N 85.9805°W	04:02–04:28	21.31 mi (34.30 km)	1,400 yd (1,300 m)
EF2	This large, strong tornado touched down in Pike County just south of Troy, initially snapping branches from the trees in the area and causing significant roof damage to a parks and recreation building. Moving northeast just to the east of Troy, the tornado intensified to EF1 strength, snapping and uprooting trees and also causing significant damage to a service station canopy. The tornado continued to intensify, reaching its peak strength of high-end EF2 as it rendered a home uninhabitable. The tornado maintained its intensity as it continued to cause widespread tree damage as it moved northeast. The tornado weakened as it continued through Pike County, although one more area of low-end EF2 damage occurred where a metal truss tower collapsed. It continued to weaken and narrow as it moved into Bullock County before lifting.						
EF0	NW of Cusseta	Chambers	AL	32.7831°N 85.381°W	04:59–05:03	3.8 mi (6.1 km)	100 yd (91 m)
EF0	Several pine trees were uprooted.						

=== March 16 event ===
List of confirmed tornadoes – Sunday, March 16, 2025
EF#	Location	County / Parish	State	Start Coord.	Time (UTC)	Path length	Max width
EF1	Pebble City to NNE of Sale City	Mitchell	GA	31.2453°N 84.076°W	10:28–10:36	5.31 mi (8.55 km)	1,200 yd (1,100 m)
EF1	This tornado began south of SR 37, snapping trees and bending part of an irrigation system before moving into Pebble City, where it destroyed a volunteer fire department building and a community center. As it continued northeast, it snapped numerous trees and power poles, with more extensive tree damage noted along its path. The tornado continued northeast, where a double-wide manufactured home was shifted off its foundation, windows were blown out of two homes, and more trees were uprooted. The tornado dissipated shortly after uprooting another tree just west of the Mitchell-Colquitt county line.						
EF0	E of Girard (1st tornado)	Burke	GA	33.0272°N 81.6758°W	11:00–11:04	4.35 mi (7.00 km)	75 yd (69 m)
EF0	Several pine trees were snapped.						
EF0	E of Girard (2nd tornado)	Burke	GA	33.0289°N 81.6552°W	11:01–11:04	3.09 mi (4.97 km)	100 yd (91 m)
EF0	A home had its shingles damaged, and minor tree damage occurred.						
EF0	E of Snelling	Barnwell	SC	33.2373°N 81.4195°W	12:27–12:29	0.3 mi (0.48 km)	50 yd (46 m)
EF0	This weak tornado uprooted at least five pine trees and snapped several large branches.						
EF1	S of Chapin to W of Lake Murray of Richland	Lexington	SC	34.08°N 81.39°W	12:38–12:48	5.83 mi (9.38 km)	125 yd (114 m)
EF1	Weak tree damage occurred along the north side of Lake Murray.						
EF0	ENE of Racepond to SE of Hickox	Charlton, Brantley	GA	31.0328°N 82.043°W	14:52–15:01	6.79 mi (10.93 km)	10 yd (9.1 m)
EF0	A weak tornado snapped small trees and large branches as it moved east-northeast. The most significant damage occurred near the center of Winokur, where a shed was destroyed, shingles were blown off houses, and a large tree fell on power lines. The tornado continued into a forested area before dissipating.						
EF1	NW of Olustee	Columbia, Baker	FL	30.2663°N 82.4884°W	15:38–15:44	2.73 mi (4.39 km)	120 yd (110 m)
EF1	A tornado occurred in the Osceola National Forest, snapping or uprooting many trees.						
EF1	Northeastern St. Marys	Elk	PA	41.4934°N 78.4747°W	16:22–16:23	0.51 mi (0.82 km)	200 yd (180 m)
EF1	Hundreds of trees were downed, some of which were also uprooted. Utility poles were broken, a barn had its roof partially lifted, and a window on a house was also blown in.						
EF1	E of New Salem-Buffington	Fayette	PA	39.9087°N 79.7941°W	16:44–16:46	1.67 mi (2.69 km)	150 yd (140 m)
EF1	This tornado initially produced sporadic tree damage before intensifying, damaging homes, uprooting trees, and flattening a small shed. It continued northeast, tearing part of a roof off a house and lofting debris 500 ft (150 m) into a treeline. The tornado then weakened, causing minor damage before dissipating near US 40.						
EF1	E of Everson to N of Donegal	Fayette, Westmoreland	PA	40.084°N 79.4856°W	17:05–17:11	7.7 mi (12.4 km)	75 yd (69 m)
EF1	A tornado developed within a squall line, initially causing tree damage before intensifying and impacting several areas with snapped trees, tilted power poles, and structural damage, including a flipped RV trailer and a lost carport roof. The tornado weakened as it ascended a hillside near Donegal Lake and lifted.						
EF1	SW of Ligonier	Westmoreland	PA	40.2198°N 79.2946°W	17:19–17:20	1.21 mi (1.95 km)	50 yd (46 m)
EF1	A brief tornado primarily caused tree damage, snapping and uprooting numerous pines and maples.						
EF1	NNE of Ligonier to SSE of Bolivar	Westmoreland	PA	40.3002°N 79.1866°W	17:25–17:27	4.15 mi (6.68 km)	50 yd (46 m)
EF1	This short-lived tornado snapped hardwood trees and severely damaged a barn, stripping its roof and collapsing three walls. It weakened and dissipated after moving through a wooded area.						
EF1	N of Black Lick	Indiana	PA	40.4856°N 79.1785°W	17:30–17:31	1.21 mi (1.95 km)	50 yd (46 m)
EF1	A tornado touched down, partially collapsing a barn and damaging trees before intensifying along a ridge line. It snapped tree tops, destroyed a second barn, and lofted debris over 300 yd (270 m) before continuing into the woods, uprooting large hardwoods and snapping multiple trunks.						
EF1	WSW of Keating	Clinton	PA	41.2545°N 78.0534°W	18:48–18:49	0.66 mi (1.06 km)	500 yd (460 m)
EF1	Several hundred trees were uprooted or snapped.						
EF1	ENE of Currie to WSW of St. Helena	Pender	NC	34.4698°N 78.0314°W	23:25–23:28	3.14 mi (5.05 km)	200 yd (180 m)
EF1	Multiple dog kennels were damaged, homes had their roofs slightly damaged, and several trees were snapped.						

== See also ==
- Weather of 2025
- List of North American tornadoes and tornado outbreaks
- List of F4 and EF4 tornadoes
  - List of F4 and EF4 tornadoes (2020–present)
- Tornadoes of 2025
  - List of United States tornadoes from January to March 2025
- Lists of tornadoes and tornado outbreaks
- Tornadoes of 2025
