= Missouri Route 153 =

State highway in Missouri, U.S.

Route 153
- MO 153 highlighted in red

Route information
- Maintained by MoDOT
- Length: 47.024 mi (75.678 km)

Major junctions
- South end: Route 25 in White Oak
- US 62 in Risco
- North end: Future I-57 / US 60 / Route N east of Dexter

Location
- Country: United States
- State: Missouri

Highway system
- Missouri State Highway System; Interstate; US; State; Supplemental
← Route 152	→ Route 154

Route 153 is a highway in southeastern Missouri, United States. Its northern terminus is at U.S. Route 60 midway between Sikeston and Dexter. Its southern terminus is at Route 25 north of Kennett.

== Major intersections ==
County	Location	mi	km	Destinations	Notes
Dunklin	White Oak	0.000	0.000	Route 25 – Holcomb, Kennett	
Pemiscot	No major junctions				
New Madrid	Gideon	14.895	23.971	Route 162 east – Portageville	Southern end of Route 162 overlap
New Madrid	Gideon	15.460	24.880	Route 162 west – Clarkton	Northern end of Route 162 overlap
New Madrid	Risco	27.937	44.960	US 62 to US 61 – Malden	
Stoddard	Hunterville	46.256	74.442	Route 114 – Grayridge, Essex	
Stoddard	Richland Township	47.024	75.678	US 60 (Future I-57) / Route N	Roadway continues as Route N
1.000 mi = 1.609 km; 1.000 km = 0.621 mi: Concurrency terminus
