= Missouri Route 162 =

State highway in Missouri, U.S.

Route 162
- Route 162 highlighted in green

Route information
- Maintained by MoDOT
- Length: 29.767 mi (47.905 km)
- Existed: 1956–present

Major junctions
- West end: Route 25 in Clarkton
- I-55 / US 61 in Portageville
- East end: Mississippi River near Portageville

Location
- Country: United States
- State: Missouri
- Counties: Dunklin, New Madrid

Highway system
- Missouri State Highway System; Interstate; US; State; Supplemental
← Route 161	→ Route 163

Route 162 is a state highway in the Missouri Bootheel. Its western terminus is at Route 25 in Clarkton, Dunklin County, and the route travels eastward to nearby towns of Gideon and Portageville, where it intersects U.S. Route 61 (US 61) and Interstate 55 (I-55). The road then continues through rural New Madrid County and ends at a boat ramp near the Mississippi River.

The route was designated in 1956 to replace two supplemental routes that extended from Clarkton to Portageville. The route was fully paved in the same year, and an interchange was built at I-55 by 1967.

== Route description ==
In 2015, Missouri Department of Transportation (MoDOT) calculated as many as 1,888 vehicles traveling on Route 162 west of Route 153, and as few as 252 vehicles traveling east of Route M. This is expressed in terms of annual average daily traffic (AADT), a measure of traffic volume for any average day of the year.

The route is located in Dunklin and New Madrid counties. The route starts at a T-intersection with Route 25 on the western edge of Clarkton. It travels on the northern side of the city, and leaves city limits and Dunklin County past Shelton Drive. The road enters New Madrid County and travels through a small section of farmland before entering the city of Gideon. In the northern side of the city, the route meets Route 153 at a T-intersection, and it travels southward concurrently with Route 153. At Fourth Street, Route 162 travels eastward, ending the concurrency. The route passes by the entrance of the Gideon Memorial Airport, before leaving the city at County Road 279 (CRD 279). At CRD 268, the road begins to travel southeastward until it reaches CRD 272, crossing several streams along the way. Route B becomes concurrent with Route 162, crossing a river and intersecting two county roads before continuing southwards. The route crosses the Little River past CRD 357. At McCrate Avenue, Route 162 enters Portageville. The road travels across the northern part of the city, intersecting city streets and Route F. After crossing over the River Subdivision railroad, the road meets US 61 at a T-intersection and becomes concurrent. Both US 61 and Route 162 travel southwestward until the road reaches Main Street. At this point, US 61 and Route 162 travel eastward and crosses over the Portage Bayou, while Route T begins travelling southward. Just outside of Portageville, the road meets I-55 at a diamond interchange, and US 61 continues its concurrency with I-55. Route 162 continues eastward through rural New Madrid County. East of CRD 427, the road intersects the termini of Routes KK and TT. At Route M, Route 162 begins travelling southwestwards toward the Mississippi River. CRD 439 is the last intersection before the road ends at a boat ramp near the river.

== History ==
Around 1932, Routes C and K were designated along gravel roads in the Missouri Bootheel. Route C connected from Route 25 in Clarkton to Gideon, while Route K was from Portageville to near the Mississippi River. Route K was extended southeastward one year later, intersecting the newly designated Route M. Route C was extended east of Gideon in 1935, and its section from Clarkton to Gideon was paved one year later. The section of Route C east of Gideon was paved by 1949, and the route was extended eastward by 1953. Route K was also paved during that time. By 1954, Route C was extended along a gravel road to Portageville, connecting with US 61 and Route K. In 1956, Route 162 was designated, replacing Routes C and K. The remaining gravel section and was paved that year. An interchange at I-55 was being built during 1967, and it was completed later that year. The project was part of the I-55 extension from New Madrid to Portageville, with a total cost of $6,375,556 in 1966.

== Major intersections ==
County	Location	mi	km	Destinations	Notes
Dunklin		0.000	0.000	Route 25 – Holcomb, Malden	
New Madrid	Gideon	3.057	4.920	Route 153 (Main Street) – Risco	Western end of Route 153 concurrency
New Madrid	Gideon	3.622	5.829	Route 153 (Main Street) – Peach Orchard	Eastern end of Route 153 concurrency
New Madrid		8.290	13.341	Route B to Route 153	Western end of Route B concurrency
New Madrid		9.779	15.738	Route B – Wardell	Eastern end of Route B concurrency
New Madrid		16.260	26.168	Route F	
New Madrid	Portageville	17.054	27.446	US 61 – Marston	Western end of US 61 concurrency
New Madrid	Portageville	18.084	29.103	Route T	
New Madrid	Portageville	18.663– 18.769	30.035– 30.206	I-55 / US 61 – Blytheville, Sikeston	Eastern end of US 61 concurrency; Diamond interchange
New Madrid		22.493	36.199	Route KK / Route TT	
New Madrid		25.500	41.038	Route M	
New Madrid		29.767	47.905	Dead end	Boat ramp at Mississippi River
1.000 mi = 1.609 km; 1.000 km = 0.621 mi: Concurrency terminus
