= Idalia =

Idalia may refer to:

== Places ==
- Idalia, Queensland, suburb of Townsville, Queensland, Australia
- Idalia, Colorado, unincorporated community in Yuma County, Colorado, US
- Idalia, Missouri, unincorporated community in Stoddard County, Missouri, US
- Idalia Manor, historic home located at Mt. Pleasant, New Castle County, Delaware, US
- Idalia, a name of the ancient city of Idalium in Cyprus

== People ==
- Sobriquet of Greek goddess Aphrodite
- Idalia Anreus (1932–1998), Cuban actress who worked in both theatre and film
- Idalia Gumbs (1933–2000), Anguillan politician
- Idalia Hechavarría (born 1974), Cuban sprinter

== Other uses ==
- Idalia (genus), genus of moths
- Hurricane Idalia, 2023 Atlantic Ocean tropical cyclone
