= Powe =

Powe may refer to:

- Powe House
- Powe, Missouri
- B. W. Powe (1955), Canadian poet
- Darroll Powe (1985), Canadian ice hockey player
- Jerrell Powe (1987), American NFL player
- Karl Powe (1962), American NFL player
- Leon Powe (1984), American basketballer
- Lucas A. Powe, Jr., American lawyer
- Sheldon Powe-Hobbs (1992), Australian rules footballer
