= Zadock, Missouri =

Unincorporated community in Missouri, U.S.

Coordinates: 36°59′20″N 89°56′14″W

Zadock is an unincorporated community in northern Stoddard County, in the U.S. state of Missouri. The community lies north of the Castor River, approximately seven miles north of Bloomfield, in the Township of Pike. It is elevated at 427 feet and is located in the Central Time Zone.

== History ==
A post office called Zadock was established in 1891, and remained in operation until 1916. The namesake of Zadock is uncertain.
