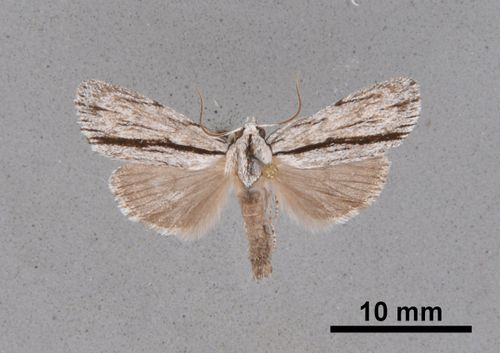

Scientific classification
- Kingdom: Animalia
- Phylum: Arthropoda
- Clade: Pancrustacea
- Class: Insecta
- Order: Lepidoptera
- Superfamily: Noctuoidea
- Family: Noctuidae
- Genus: Acronicta
- Species: A. perblanda

Binomial name
- Acronicta perblanda Ferguson, 1989

= Acronicta perblanda =

Species of moth

Acronicta perblanda is a moth of the family Noctuidae. It is found from Carteret County, North Carolina and Stoddard County, Missouri to northern Florida to southern Louisiana.

Adults are on wing from March to April. There is probably one generation per year.
