= Eaglette, Missouri =

Unincorporated community in the American state of Missouri

Coordinates: 37°02′08″N 90°02′22″W

Eaglette is an extinct town in Stoddard County, in the U.S. state of Missouri. The GNIS classifies it as a populated place.

A post office called Eaglette was established in 1904, and remained in operation until 1909. The community was named for eagles' nests near the original town site.
