= Maulsby =

Maulsby may refer to:

== People ==
=== Surname ===
- Israel D. Maulsby (1781–1839), American politician from Maryland
- Ruhl Maulsby (1923–1996), American politician from Iowa
- William P. Maulsby (1815–1894), American politician and judge from Maryland

=== Given name ===
- Maulsby Willett Blackman (1876–1943), American entomologist

== Places ==
- Maulsby, Missouri, unincorporated community in the United States
