= Charter Oak (disambiguation) =

The Charter Oak is the oak tree said to have hidden the charter of the Connecticut Colony.

Charter Oak may also refer to:

- The Charter Oak Bridge, named for the tree, which carries U.S. Highway 5 and Connecticut State Route 15 over the Connecticut River
- Charter Oak State College, a Connecticut public college offering distance education courses
- American schooner Charter Oak, a schooner and cargo ship out of Boston used in the American Civil War, captured by Confederate forces and burned in 1864

== Places ==
- Charter Oak, California, United States
- Charter Oak, Iowa, United States
- Charter Oak, Missouri, United States
