= Ives (disambiguation) =

Ives is a surname and a given name. It may also refer to:

== Places ==
- Ives, Missouri, United States, an unincorporated community
- Ives Peak, Washington state, United States
- Ives Bank, a submarine bank in the Bellingshausen Sea, Antarctica
- Ives Tongue, a narrow tongue of land projecting from an island between Fold Island and the coast of Kemp Land, Antarctica
- Ives (crater), on the planet Mercury

== Other uses ==
- Ives Manufacturing Company, an American toy manufacturer (1868–1932)
- Gouverneur Wesleyan Seminary, Gouverneur, New York, United States, renamed Ives Seminary in 1874
- Ives Concert Park, a venue on the Westside campus of Western Connecticut State University
- IVES system (Intelligent, Versatile, Efficient and Solid), a construction type of ballastless railway track

== See also ==
- Ives Head, a geological Site of Special Scientific Interest south of Shepshed in Leicestershire, UK
- Currier and Ives, U.S. lithographer
- Ives noir, hybrid wine grape
- St Ives (disambiguation)
