= Painton =

Painton may refer to:

- Painton, Missouri
- Frederick C. Painton (1895–1945), American writer

== See also ==
- Painten, Bavaria, Germany
- Paignton, Devon, England
- Paynton, Saskatchewan, Canada
