= Cyrus, Missouri =

Unincorporated community in Missouri, U.S.

Coordinates: 36°39′34″N 90°03′20″W

Cyrus is an unincorporated community in southeast Stoddard County, in the U.S. state of Missouri. The community was located on Missouri Route U between Bernie four miles to the east and Powe two miles to the west. The location is along a line of low hills, an extension of Crowleys Ridge.

== History ==
A post office called Cyrus was established in 1902, and remained in operation until 1905. The community was named after the proprietor of a local mill.
