= Curdton, Missouri =

Unincorporated community in Missouri, U.S.

Coordinates: 36°57′52″N 90°03′19″W

Curdton is an unincorporated community in Stoddard County, in the U.S. state of Missouri.

== History ==
A post office called Curdton was established in 1899, and remained in operation until 1910. The community was named after Sam Curd, an early citizen.
