= Dudley, Missouri =

City in Stoddard County, Missouri, United States

- City
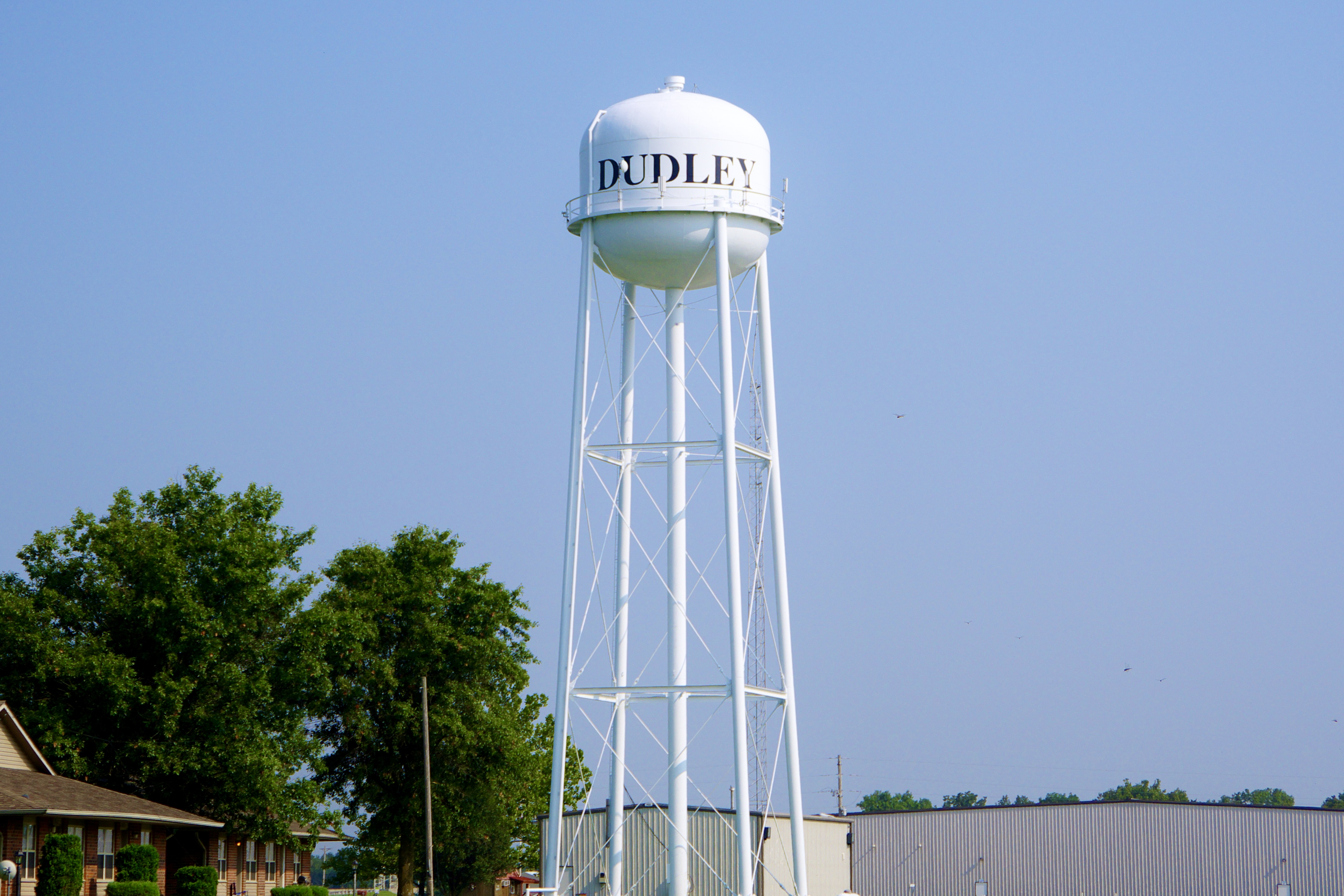
- Water tower

- Location of Dudley, Missouri
- Coordinates: 36°47′23″N 90°05′30″W
- Country: United States
- State: Missouri
- County: Stoddard

Area
  - Total: 0.39 sq mi (1.01 km^{2})
  - Land: 0.39 sq mi (1.01 km^{2})
  - Water: 0 sq mi (0.00 km^{2})
- Elevation: 351 ft (107 m)

Population (2020)
  - Total: 101
  - Density: 259.5/sq mi (100.19/km^{2})
- Time zone: UTC-6 (Central (CST))
  - Summer (DST): UTC-5 (CDT)
- ZIP code: 63936
- Area code: 573
- FIPS code: 29-20296
- GNIS feature ID: 2394566

Dudley is a city in Stoddard County, Missouri, United States. The population was 101 at the 2020 census.

== History ==
A post office called Dudley has been in operation since 1879. The community has the name of one Mr. Dudley, a pioneer citizen.

== Geography ==
Dudley is located seven miles west of Dexter.

According to the United States Census Bureau, the city has a total area of 0.39 square miles (1.01 km^{2}), all land.

== Demographics ==
Historical population
Census	Pop.	Note	%±
1900	229		—
1910	150		−34.5%
1920	257		71.3%
1930	271		5.4%
1940	339		25.1%
1950	319		−5.9%
1960	287		−10.0%
1970	248		−13.6%
1980	287		15.7%
1990	271		−5.6%
2000	289		6.6%
2010	232		−19.7%
2020	101		−56.5%
U.S. Decennial Census

=== 2010 census ===
As of the census of 2010, there were 232 people, 103 households, and 62 families living in the city. The population density was 594.9 inhabitants per square mile (229.7/km^{2}). There were 111 housing units at an average density of 284.6 per square mile (109.9/km^{2}). The racial makeup of the city was 99.6% White and 0.4% from two or more races. Hispanic or Latino of any race were 0.9% of the population.

There were 103 households, of which 29.1% had children under the age of 18 living with them, 35.9% were married couples living together, 15.5% had a female householder with no husband present, 8.7% had a male householder with no wife present, and 39.8% were non-families. 33.0% of all households were made up of individuals, and 13.6% had someone living alone who was 65 years of age or older. The average household size was 2.25 and the average family size was 2.77.

The median age in the city was 36.5 years. 21.6% of residents were under the age of 18; 10% were between the ages of 18 and 24; 24.5% were from 25 to 44; 31% were from 45 to 64; and 12.9% were 65 years of age or older. The gender makeup of the city was 48.3% male and 51.7% female.

=== 2000 census ===
As of the census of 2000, there were 289 people, 117 households, and 84 families living in the city. The population density was 721.2 inhabitants per square mile (278.5/km^{2}). There were 135 housing units at an average density of 336.9 per square mile (130.1/km^{2}). The racial makeup of the city was 99.65% White, and 0.35% from two or more races. Hispanic or Latino of any race were 0.35% of the population.

There were 117 households, out of which 32.5% had children under the age of 18 living with them, 58.1% were married couples living together, 5.1% had a female householder with no husband present, and 28.2% were non-families. 23.9% of all households were made up of individuals, and 13.7% had someone living alone who was 65 years of age or older. The average household size was 2.47 and the average family size was 2.88.

In the city, the population was spread out, with 24.6% under the age of 18, 12.8% from 18 to 24, 28.4% from 25 to 44, 18.0% from 45 to 64, and 16.3% who were 65 years of age or older. The median age was 35 years. For every 100 females there were 96.6 males. For every 100 females age 18 and over, there were 89.6 males.

The median income for a household in the city was $23,542, and the median income for a family was $29,821. Males had a median income of $26,250 versus $19,107 for females. The per capita income for the city was $12,339. About 12.7% of families and 17.4% of the population were below the poverty line, including 10.1% of those under the age of eighteen and 34.1% of those 65 or over.

== Education ==
It is in the Dexter R-XI School District.

== See also ==
- List of cities in Missouri
