= Guam, Missouri =

Unincorporated community in Missouri, U.S.

Coordinates: 36°54′07″N 89°49′25″W

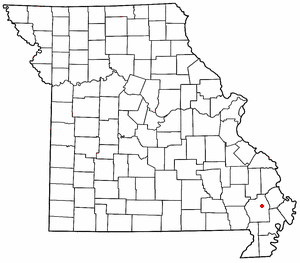

Guam is an unincorporated community in Stoddard County, Missouri, United States. It is located ten miles northeast of Dexter.

Guam was originally called "Paront", and under the latter name was founded ca. 1910. The present name is after the territory of Guam.
