= Kinder, Missouri =

Unincorporated community in Missouri, U.S.

Coordinates: 37°00′57″N 90°04′41″W

Kinder is an unincorporated community in Stoddard County, in the U.S. state of Missouri.

== History ==
A post office called Kinder was established in 1910, and remained in operation until 1963. The community has the name of James Kinder, the proprietor of a local sawmill.
