= Buffington, Missouri =

Unincorporated community in Missouri, U.S.

Coordinates: 36°49′50″N 89°44′35″W

Buffington is an unincorporated community in Stoddard County, in the U.S. state of Missouri.

== History ==
A post office called Buffington was established in 1877 and remained in operation until 1905. The community has the name of one Mr. Buffington, the proprietor of a local sawmill.
