= Brownwood, Missouri =

Unincorporated community in Missouri, U.S.

Coordinates: 37°04′51″N 89°57′16″W

Brownwood is an unincorporated community in northern Stoddard County, Missouri, United States. It is located twenty miles north of Dexter.

A post office called Brownwood has been in operation since 1882.
