= Marco, Missouri =

Unincorporated community in Missouri, U.S.

Coordinates: 36°44′52″N 89°48′29″W

Marco is an unincorporated community in Stoddard County, Missouri, United States.

== History ==
A post office called Marco was established in 1905, and remained in operation until 1914. It is unclear why the name "Marco" was applied to this community, although several traditions attempt to explain its origin.
