= Elk Township, Stoddard County, Missouri =

Township in the US state of Missouri

Coordinates: 36.6936°N 89.8178°W

Elk Township is a township in Stoddard County, in the U.S. state of Missouri.

Elk Township was erected in 1868, taking its name from Elk Creek.
