= Shreve, Missouri =

Unincorporated community in Missouri, U.S.

Coordinates: 36°38′46″N 90°05′45″W

Shreve is an unincorporated community in Stoddard County, in the U.S. state of Missouri.

The community name is taken from that of one Mr. Shreve, proprietor of a local sawmill.
