= Stoddard, Missouri =

Unincorporated community in Missouri, U.S.

Coordinates: 36°47′29″N 90°02′03″W

Stoddard is an unincorporated community in Stoddard County, in the U.S. state of Missouri.

Stoddard had its start in the 1890s. The community was named after Stoddard County.
