= Heagy, Missouri =

Unincorporated community in Missouri, U.S.

Coordinates: 37°02′18″N 89°48′10″W

Heagy is an unincorporated community in Stoddard County, in the U.S. state of Missouri.

== History ==
A post office called Heagy was established in 1920, and remained in operation until 1923. The community has the name of Louis Heagy, the son of the original owner of the town site.
