= Cobb, Stoddard County, Missouri =

Unincorporated community in Missouri, U.S.

Coordinates: 36°55′03″N 90°12′48″W

Cobb is an unincorporated community in Stoddard County, in the U.S. state of Missouri.

Variant names were "Cobbs" and "Cobbs Station". The community has the name of N. M. Cobbs, a businessman in the local lumber industry.
