= Tillman, Missouri =

Unincorporated community in Missouri, U.S.

Coordinates: 37°03′19″N 89°51′51″W

Tillman is an unincorporated community in Stoddard County, in the U.S. state of Missouri.

== History ==
A variant spelling was "Tilman". A post office called Tilman was established in 1883, and remained in operation until 1906. The community has the name of John Tilman, proprietor of a local sawmill.
