= Frisco, Missouri =

Unincorporated community in Missouri, U.S.

Coordinates: 36°45′32″N 89°51′44″W

Frisco is an unincorporated community in Stoddard County, in the U.S. state of Missouri.

== History ==
A post office called Frisco was established in 1895, and remained in operation until 1914. The community derives its name from the nickname of the St. Louis–San Francisco Railway.
