= Leora, Missouri =

Unincorporated community in Missouri, U.S.

Coordinates: 37°00′01″N 90°01′05″W

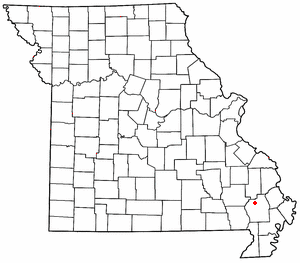

Leora is an unincorporated community in northern Stoddard County, Missouri, United States. It is located approximately thirteen miles north of Dexter.

A post office called Leora was established in 1880, and remained in operation until 1969. The community was named after Leora White, the daughter of an early settler.
