= Peach Orchard, Missouri =

Unincorporated community in Missouri, U.S.

Peach Orchard
- Unincorporated community
- Location within Missouri
- Coordinates: 36°21′56″N 89°56′02″W
- Country: United States of America
- State: Missouri
- County: Pemiscot

Peach Orchard is an unincorporated community in northwest Pemiscot County, Missouri, United States. It is located on Route 153, approximately twenty miles northwest of Caruthersville.

A post office called Peach Orchard was established in 1936, and remained in operation until 1973.It and an adjoining mercantile store were destroyed in a mysterious fire in 1973. The community was named after a peach orchard near the original town site.
