= Messler, Missouri =

Unincorporated community in Missouri, U.S.

Coordinates: 37°03′58″N 89°48′12″W

Messler is an unincorporated community in Stoddard County, in the U.S. state of Missouri.

== History ==
A post office called Messler was established in 1912, and remained in operation until 1939. The community has the name of W. P. Messler, original owner of the site. A variant spelling was "Mesler".
