= Swinton, Missouri =

Unincorporated community in Missouri, U.S.

Coordinates: 37°01′40″N 89°56′41″W

Swinton is an unincorporated community in Stoddard County, in the U.S. state of Missouri.

== History ==
A post office called Swinton was established in 1898, and remained in operation until 1952. The community has the name of the Swinton family of settlers.
