= Toppertown, Missouri =

Unincorporated community in Missouri, U.S.

Coordinates: 36°57′47″N 89°50′28″W

Toppertown is an unincorporated community in Stoddard County, in the U.S. state of Missouri.

A variant name was "Topper". The community has the name of one Mr. Topper, proprietor of a local sawmill.
