= Pyletown, Missouri =

Unincorporated community in Missouri, U.S.

Coordinates: 36°43′29″N 90°01′07″W

Pyletown is an unincorporated community in southwest Stoddard County, in the U.S. state of Missouri. The community is on Missouri Route H approximately six miles southwest of Dexter. Otter Lake in the Otter Slough Conservation Area is five miles west of the community.

== History ==
A variant name was "Pyle". A post office called Pyle was established in 1895, and remained in operation until 1905. The community was named after J. K. Pyle, a local merchant.
