= Castor Township, Stoddard County, Missouri =

Township in the US state of Missouri

Coordinates: 36.8856°N 89.9403°W

Castor Township is a township in Stoddard County, in the U.S. state of Missouri.

Castor Township was erected in 1820, taking its name from the Castor River.
