= LaValle, Missouri =

Unincorporated community in Missouri, U.S.

Coordinates: 36°40′31″N 89°46′25″W

LaValle (sometimes spelled La Valle) is an unincorporated community in Stoddard County, in the U.S. state of Missouri.

== History ==
A post office called "La Valle" was established in 1903, and remained in operation until 1953. The community has the name of John LaValle, an early settler.
