= Bunker Hill, Stoddard County, Missouri =

Unincorporated community in Missouri, U.S.

Coordinates: 36°42′21″N 89°58′11″W

Bunker Hill is an unincorporated community in Stoddard County, in the U.S. state of Missouri.

== History ==
The community was once home to Bunker Hill School, now defunct. The schoolhouse was named after the Battle of Bunker Hill, fought during the Revolutionary War.
