= Avert, Missouri =

Unincorporated community in Missouri, U.S.

Coordinates: 36°55′46″N 89°50′52″W

Avert is an unincorporated community in Stoddard County, in the U.S. state of Missouri.

== History ==
A post office called Avert was established in 1890 and remained in operation until 1945. An early variant name was "Day", after L. B. Day, a pioneer citizen.
