= Shawan, Missouri =

Unincorporated community in Missouri, U.S.

Coordinates: 36°57′50″N 89°46′47″W

Shawan is an unincorporated community in Stoddard County, in the U.S. state of Missouri.

A variant name was "Shawnan". The community was named after the Shawnee people.
