= Idlewild, Missouri =

Unincorporated community in Missouri, U.S.

Coordinates: 37.0036626°N 90.1039876°W

Idlewild is an unincorporated community in Stoddard County, in the U.S. state of Missouri.

Idlewild was laid out in 1910 when the railroad was extended to that point.
