= Ives, Missouri =

Unincorporated community in Missouri, U.S.

Coordinates: 36°47′07″N 90°09′51″W

Ives is an unincorporated community in Stoddard County, in the U.S. state of Missouri.

Ives was established c. 1920, and named after John Ivester, an early settler.
