= Ardeola, Missouri =

Unincorporated community in Missouri, U.S.

Coordinates: 37°00′04″N 89°51′10″W

Ardeola is an unincorporated community in Stoddard County, in the U.S. state of Missouri.

== History ==
A post office called Ardeola was established in 1889, and remained in operation until 1949. The source of the name "Ardeola" is unknown.

In 1925, Ardeola had 156 inhabitants.
