= Idalia, Missouri =

Unincorporated community in Missouri, United States

Coordinates: 36°51′50″N 89°51′39″W

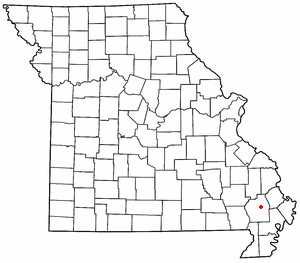

Idalia is an unincorporated community in Stoddard County, Missouri, United States. It is located six miles northeast of Dexter.

A post office called Idalia was established in 1889, and remained in operation until 1966. According to tradition, the community was named after the daughter of the original owner of the site.

Idalia was at milepost 43.91 of the Illmo Sub-division of the St. Louis Southwestern Railway. It was known as Station I-44 and in 1935 had a day telegrapher. The telegraph call for Idalia was "DN". There was a 159 car siding and additional capacity of 26 cars in the local business tracks of the railroad. A mail crane was located at Idalia to pick up the U. S. Mail by moving train. According to Paul Wooldridge, Idalia had a population of about 30 in 1934 while he was there as a farm worker. The Cotton Belt depot was destroyed in a freight train derailment in 1939.
