= Grayridge, Missouri =

Unincorporated community in Missouri, U.S.

- Census-Designated Place
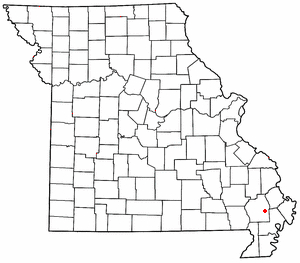
- Location of Grayridge in Missouri
- Coordinates: 36°49′29″N 89°46′55″W
- Country: United States
- State: Missouri
- County: Stoddard

Area
  - Total: 1.02 sq mi (2.64 km^{2})
  - Land: 1.02 sq mi (2.64 km^{2})
  - Water: 0 sq mi (0.00 km^{2})
- Elevation: 299 ft (91 m)

Population (2020)
  - Total: 87
  - Density: 85.4/sq mi (32.99/km^{2})
- FIPS code: 29-28864
- GNIS feature ID: 2587076

Grayridge is a census-designated place in eastern Stoddard County, Missouri, United States. It is located approximately ten miles southwest of Sikeston, just south of U.S. Route 60.

A post office called Gray's Ridge was established in 1879, the name was changed to Gray Ridge in 1887, and the present name of Grayridge was adopted in 1894. The community has the name of W. C. Gray, a pioneer citizen.

Grayridge is home to Stoddard County Oilseed Crushing, which is developing biodiesel.

== Demographics ==
Historical population
Census	Pop.	Note	%±
2020	87		—
U.S. Decennial Census

== Education ==
It is in the Richland R-I School District.
