= Essex, Missouri =

City in Stoddard County, Missouri, United States

- City
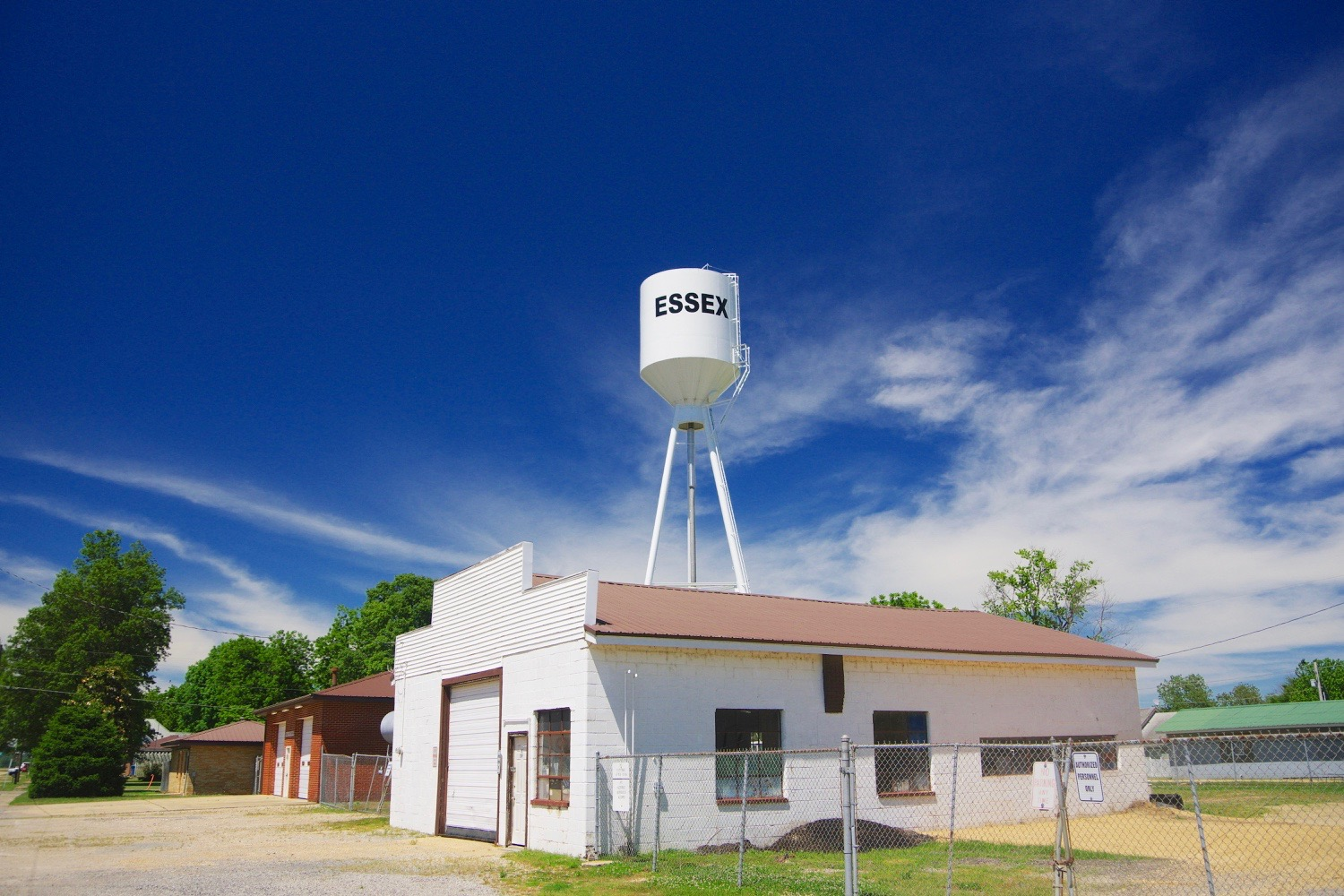
- Water tower

- Location of Essex, Missouri
- Coordinates: 36°48′43″N 89°51′45″W
- Country: United States
- State: Missouri
- County: Stoddard

Area
  - Total: 0.29 sq mi (0.75 km^{2})
  - Land: 0.29 sq mi (0.75 km^{2})
  - Water: 0 sq mi (0.00 km^{2})
- Elevation: 299 ft (91 m)

Population (2020)
  - Total: 403
  - Density: 1,395/sq mi (538.6/km^{2})
- Time zone: UTC-6 (Central (CST))
  - Summer (DST): UTC-5 (CDT)
- ZIP code: 63846
- Area code: 573
- FIPS code: 29-22600
- GNIS feature ID: 2394703

Essex is a city in Stoddard County, Missouri, United States. The population was 403 at the 2020 census.

== History ==
Essex was platted in 1873 as a stop along the Missouri Pacific Railroad, and named after one Mr. Essex, a railroad official. A post office in Essex has been in operation since 1874.

== Geography ==
Essex is located at 36°48′43″N 89°51′45″W (36.812040, -89.862514). It lies along Missouri Route 114 between Sikeston and Dexter. U.S. Route 60 passes just to the north.

According to the United States Census Bureau, the city has a total area of 0.29 square miles (0.75 km^{2}), all land.

== Demographics ==
Historical population
| Census | Pop. | Note | %± |
|---|---|---|---|
| 1880 | 77 | | — |
| 1900 | 163 | | — |
| 1910 | 548 | | 236.2% |
| 1920 | 589 | | 7.5% |
| 1930 | 578 | | −1.9% |
| 1940 | 639 | | 10.6% |
| 1950 | 549 | | −14.1% |
| 1960 | 511 | | −6.9% |
| 1970 | 493 | | −3.5% |
| 1980 | 545 | | 10.5% |
| 1990 | 531 | | −2.6% |
| 2000 | 524 | | −1.3% |
| 2010 | 472 | | −9.9% |
| 2020 | 403 | | −14.6% |
U.S. Decennial Census

=== 2010 census ===
As of the census of 2010, there were 472 people, 196 households, and 127 families living in the city. The population density was 1,627.6 inhabitants per square mile (628.4/km^{2}). There were 225 housing units at an average density of 775.9 per square mile (299.6/km^{2}). The racial makeup of the city was 98.1% White, 0.6% African American, 0.2% Native American, and 1.1% from two or more races. Hispanic or Latino of any race were 1.1% of the population.

There were 196 households, of which 31.6% had children under the age of 18 living with them, 45.4% were married couples living together, 14.3% had a female householder with no husband present, 5.1% had a male householder with no wife present, and 35.2% were non-families. 33.7% of all households were made up of individuals, and 14.3% had someone living alone who was 65 years of age or older. The average household size was 2.41 and the average family size was 3.00.

The median age in the city was 39.3 years. 23.1% of residents were under the age of 18; 11.4% were between the ages of 18 and 24; 21.6% were from 25 to 44; 28.6% were from 45 to 64; and 15.3% were 65 years of age or older. The gender makeup of the city was 49.4% male and 50.6% female.

=== 2000 census ===
As of the census of 2000, there were 524 people, 216 households, and 146 families living in the city. The population density was 1,904.6 inhabitants per square mile (735.4/km^{2}). There were 238 housing units at an average density of 865.1 per square mile (334.0/km^{2}). The racial makeup of the city was 99.05% White, 0.19% Asian, and 0.76% from two or more races. Hispanic or Latino of any race were 0.38% of the population.

There were 216 households, out of which 28.7% had children under the age of 18 living with them, 55.1% were married couples living together, 8.8% had a female householder with no husband present, and 32.4% were non-families. 31.5% of all households were made up of individuals, and 17.1% had someone living alone who was 65 years of age or older. The average household size was 2.43 and the average family size was 3.02.

In the city, the population was spread out, with 24.4% under the age of 18, 9.0% from 18 to 24, 26.1% from 25 to 44, 20.4% from 45 to 64, and 20.0% who were 65 years of age or older. The median age was 37 years. For every 100 females, there were 83.2 males. For every 100 females age 18 and over, there were 85.0 males.

The median income for a household in the city was $28,036, and the median income for a family was $35,673. Males had a median income of $25,000 versus $20,833 for females. The per capita income for the city was $14,345. About 8.2% of families and 12.0% of the population were below the poverty line, including 15.2% of those under age 18 and 14.9% of those age 65 or over.

== Education ==
It is in the Richland R-I School District. The district has elementary and high school divisions.

The town has a lending library, the Essex Public Library. It opened in 2019 and is adjacent to a post office.

== Notable person ==
- Larry McCoy, Major League Baseball umpire

== See also ==
- List of cities in Missouri
