= Durnell, Missouri =

Unincorporated community in Missouri, U.S.

Coordinates: 36°58′07″N 89°48′51″W

Durnell is an unincorporated community in Stoddard County, in the U.S. state of Missouri.

== History ==
A post office called Durnell was established in 1906, and remained in operation until 1926. The community has the name of one Mr. Durnell, a businessperson in the local lumber industry.
