= Hunterville, Missouri =

Unincorporated community in Missouri, US

Coordinates: 36°49′14″N 89°48′27″W

Hunterville is an unincorporated community in Stoddard County, in the U.S. state of Missouri.

== History ==
A post office called Hunterville was established in 1903, and remained in operation until 1932. The community has the name of Stephen B. Hunter, original owner of the town site. A variant name was "Huntersville".
