= Aid, Missouri =

Unincorporated community in Missouri, U.S.

Coordinates: 36°52′37″N 90°02′28″W

Aid is an unincorporated community in Stoddard County, in the U.S. state of Missouri. The community is on Missouri Route F six miles west of Bloomfield.

== History ==
A post office called Aid was established in 1904, and remained in operation until 1949. The original owner of the town site gave the community the first name of his son, Aid Cooper.

In 1925, Aid had 110 inhabitants.

== Notable people ==
- John E. Miller (1888–1981), U.S. senator and district judge from Arkansas
