= Painton, Missouri =

Unincorporated community in Missouri, U.S.

Coordinates: 37°04′56″N 89°47′41″W

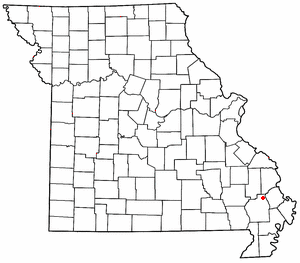

Painton (also Paradise) is an unincorporated community in northern Stoddard County, Missouri, United States. It is located twenty miles north of Dexter.

A post office called Painton has been in operation since 1918. The community has the name of Albert Painton, a local merchant.
