= Maulsby, Missouri =

Unincorporated community in Missouri, U.S.

Coordinates: 36°38′47″N 89°48′36″W

Maulsby is an unincorporated community in Stoddard County, in the U.S. state of Missouri.

Maulsby was founded c. 1902, and named after the local Maulsby family.
