= Redd, Missouri =

Unincorporated community in Missouri, U.S.

Coordinates: 36°50′52″N 90°03′38″W

Redd is an unincorporated community in Stoddard County, in the U.S. state of Missouri.

== History ==
A post office called Redd was established in 1913, and was discontinued in that same year. The community has the name of one Mr. Redd, proprietor of a local sawmill.
