= Pike Township, Stoddard County, Missouri =

Township in Stoddard County, Missouri, U.S.

Coordinates: 37.0314°N 89.8458°W

Pike Township is a township in northern Stoddard County, in the U.S. state of Missouri.

Pike Township was erected in 1829, taking its name from Zebulon Pike.
