= Risco, Missouri =

- City
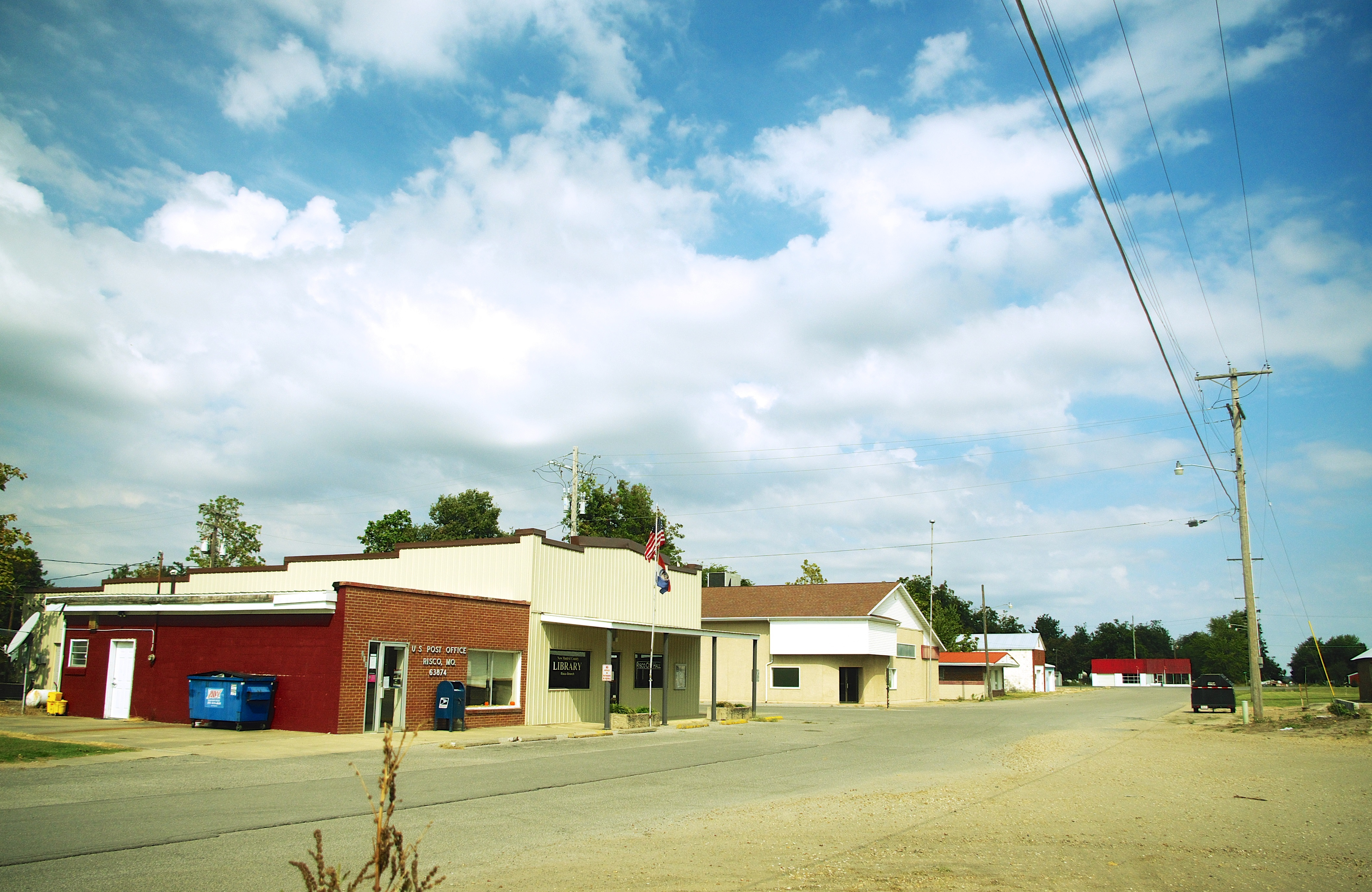
- Front Street

- Location of Risco, Missouri
- Coordinates: 36°33′04″N 89°49′07″W
- Country: United States
- State: Missouri
- County: New Madrid

Area
  - Total: 0.56 sq mi (1.45 km^{2})
  - Land: 0.56 sq mi (1.45 km^{2})
  - Water: 0 sq mi (0.00 km^{2})
- Elevation: 276 ft (84 m)

Population (2020)
  - Total: 286
  - Density: 510.6/sq mi (197.13/km^{2})
- Time zone: UTC-6 (Central (CST))
  - Summer (DST): UTC-5 (CDT)
- ZIP code: 63874
- Area code: 573
- FIPS code: 29-61994
- GNIS feature ID: 2396380

Risco is a city in New Madrid County, Missouri, United States. The population was 286 at the 2020 census.

== History ==
A post office called Risco has been in operation since 1903. The community derives its name from the Frisco Railroad.

== Geography ==
Risco is situated along U.S. Route 62, west of the highway's intersection with Missouri Route 153. Risco lies approximately seven miles east of Malden and sixteen miles west of New Madrid.

According to the United States Census Bureau, the city has a total area of 0.56 square miles (1.45 km^{2}), all land.

== Demographics ==
Historical population
Census	Pop.	Note	%±
1930	272		—
1940	429		57.7%
1950	495		15.4%
1960	502		1.4%
1970	412		−17.9%
1980	446		8.3%
1990	434		−2.7%
2000	392		−9.7%
2010	346		−11.7%
2020	286		−17.3%
U.S. Decennial Census

=== 2010 census ===
As of the census of 2010, there were 346 people, 149 households, and 92 families living in the city. The population density was 617.9 inhabitants per square mile (238.6/km^{2}). There were 169 housing units at an average density of 301.8 per square mile (116.5/km^{2}). The racial makeup of the city was 96.53% White, 1.16% Black or African American, and 2.31% from two or more races. Hispanic or Latino of any race were 0.58% of the population.

There were 149 households, of which 30.9% had children under the age of 18 living with them, 49.7% were married couples living together, 8.7% had a female householder with no husband present, 3.4% had a male householder with no wife present, and 38.3% were non-families. 30.9% of all households were made up of individuals, and 13.4% had someone living alone who was 65 years of age or older. The average household size was 2.32 and the average family size was 2.91.

The median age in the city was 41.7 years. 21.4% of residents were under the age of 18; 6% were between the ages of 18 and 24; 25.4% were from 25 to 44; 26.8% were from 45 to 64; and 20.2% were 65 years of age or older. The gender makeup of the city was 49.7% male and 50.3% female.

=== 2000 census ===
As of the census of 2000, there were 392 people, 165 households, and 115 families living in the city. The population density was 821.3 inhabitants per square mile (317.1/km^{2}). There were 177 housing units at an average density of 370.9 per square mile (143.2/km^{2}). The racial makeup of the city was 99.59% White, 0.16% African American, and 0.26% from two or more races.

There were 165 households, out of which 29.1% had children under the age of 18 living with them, 60.0% were married couples living together, 9.1% had a female householder with no husband present, and 29.7% were non-families. 26.7% of all households were made up of individuals, and 13.3% had someone living alone who was 65 years of age or older. The average household size was 2.38 and the average family size was 2.89.

In the city the population was spread out, with 21.2% under the age of 18, 10.2% from 18 to 24, 22.7% from 25 to 44, 28.3% from 45 to 64, and 17.6% who were 65 years of age or older. The median age was 42 years. For every 100 females there were 90.3 males. For every 100 females age 18 and over, there were 91.9 males.

The median income for a household in the city was $26,827, and the median income for a family was $32,857. Males had a median income of $28,750 versus $22,813 for females. The per capita income for the city was $13,777. About 13.2% of families and 14.3% of the population were below the poverty line, including 24.7% of those under age 18 and 18.9% of those age 65 or over.

== Education ==
It is in the Risco R-II School District. The school system consists of an elementary school, a combination middle and high school and a gymnasium, all on the same plot of land.

Risco has a lending library, a branch of the New Madrid County Library.

Three Rivers College's service area includes New Madrid County.
