= Aquilla, Missouri =

Unincorporated community in Missouri, U.S.

Coordinates: 36°56′49″N 89°54′53″W

Aquilla is an unincorporated community in Stoddard County, in the U.S. state of Missouri.

== History ==
A post office called Aquilla was established in 1892, and remained in operation until 1908. Some say the name Aquilla is Latin meaning "eagle", while others believe Aquilla is named after a character in the Bible.

In 1925, Aquilla had 45 inhabitants. In 2017, an artificial lake was constructed next to Bo Geary Circle. There is also one farmer's market, Shady Oak's, that opened in the area around the same time.
