= Puxico, Missouri =

- City
- Location of Puxico, Missouri
- Coordinates: 36°57′03″N 90°9′31″W
- Country: United States
- State: Missouri
- County: Stoddard

Area
  - Total: 0.68 sq mi (1.75 km^{2})
  - Land: 0.67 sq mi (1.73 km^{2})
  - Water: 0.0077 sq mi (0.02 km^{2})
- Elevation: 374 ft (114 m)

Population (2020)
  - Total: 873
  - Density: 1,310.3/sq mi (505.92/km^{2})
- Time zone: UTC-6 (Central (CST))
  - Summer (DST): UTC-5 (CDT)
- ZIP code: 63960
- Area code: 573
- FIPS code: 29-60284
- GNIS feature ID: 2396295
- Website: http://www.puxicomo.us/

Puxico (/ˈpʌksiːkoʊ/ PUK-see-koh) is a city in Stoddard County, Missouri, United States. The population was 873 at the 2020 census.

== History ==
Puxico was first settled in 1883, and named after Pucksicah, a Shawnee chief. A post office called Puxico has been in operation since 1884. Puxico was incorporated as a town in 1884.

== Puxico Homecoming ==
Puxico is known for its annual Homecoming. The event was started in the midst of the Great Depression by the Booster Club as a way to unite and organize the community. After World War II, the returning servicemen established the VFW Post and took over the tradition the Booster Club had started.

Goat burgers are a staple of the event and have been served since the late 1930s.

Homecoming also includes events such as a carnival fair, square dancing, beauty pageants and parade. It is held from the second Tuesday to Saturday in August.

== Geography ==
Puxico is located at 36°57′2″N 90°9′31″W (36.950535, -90.158611).

According to the United States Census Bureau, the city has a total area of 0.68 square miles (1.76 km^{2}), of which 0.67 square miles (1.74 km^{2}) is land and 0.01 square miles (0.03 km^{2}) is water.

== Demographics ==
Historical population
Census	Pop.	Note	%±
1890	212		—
1900	413		94.8%
1910	814		97.1%
1920	877		7.7%
1930	766		−12.7%
1940	792		3.4%
1950	749		−5.4%
1960	743		−0.8%
1970	759		2.2%
1980	833		9.7%
1990	819		−1.7%
2000	1,145		39.8%
2010	881		−23.1%
2020	873		−0.9%
U.S. Decennial Census

=== 2010 census ===
As of the census of 2010, there were 881 people, 364 households, and 227 families living in the city. The population density was 1,314.9 inhabitants per square mile (507.7/km^{2}). There were 429 housing units at an average density of 640.3 per square mile (247.2/km^{2}). The racial makeup of the city was 97.0% White, 0.1% African American, 1.1% Native American, 0.1% Asian, 0.1% Pacific Islander, and 1.5% from two or more races. Hispanic or Latino of any race were 1.5% of the population.

There were 364 households, of which 31.0% had children under the age of 18 living with them, 43.4% were married couples living together, 17.3% had a female householder with no husband present, 1.6% had a male householder with no wife present, and 37.6% were non-families. 34.9% of all households were made up of individuals, and 17.6% had someone living alone who was 65 years of age or older. The average household size was 2.33 and the average family size was 3.01.

The median age in the city was 40.6 years. 24% of residents were under the age of 18; 8.4% were between the ages of 18 and 24; 21.8% were from 25 to 44; 22.9% were from 45 to 64; and 22.9% were 65 years of age or older. The gender makeup of the city was 46.2% male and 53.8% female.

=== 2000 census ===
As of the census of 2000, there were 1,145 people, 377 households, and 232 families living in the city. The population density was 2,089.4 inhabitants per square mile (806.7/km^{2}). There were 444 housing units at an average density of 810.2 per square mile (312.8/km^{2}). The racial makeup of the city was 98.41% White, 0.19% African American, 0.17% Native American, 0.61% from other races, and 0.61% from two or more races. Hispanic or Latino of any race were 0.79% of the population.

There were 377 households, out of which 27.1% had children under the age of 18 living with them, 46.9% were married couples living together, 11.7% had a female householder with no husband present, and 38.2% were non-families. 35.5% of all households were made up of individuals, and 22.0% had someone living alone who was 65 years of age or older. The average household size was 2.20 and the average family size was 2.85.

In the city the population was spread out, with 28.0% under the age of 18, 16.6% from 18 to 24, 18.6% from 25 to 44, 14.1% from 45 to 64, and 22.6% who were 65 years of age or older. The median age was 31 years. For every 100 females, there were 107.4 males. For every 100 females age 18 and over, there were 90.3 males.

The median income for a household in the city was $20,900, and the median income for a family was $29,286. Males had a median income of $25,787 versus $18,929 for females. The per capita income for the city was $11,354. About 13.3% of families and 33.8% of the population were below the poverty line, including 33.3% of those under age 18 and 22.2% of those age 65 or over.

== Education ==
Public education in Puxico is administered by Puxico R-VIII School District.

Puxico has a lending library, the Puxico Public Library.

== Climate ==
The climate in this area is characterized by relatively high temperatures and evenly distributed precipitation throughout the year. According to the Köppen Climate Classification system, Puxico has a humid subtropical climate, abbreviated "Cfa" on climate maps.
