= Idalia Manor =

Historic house in Delaware, US

- U.S. National Register of Historic Places
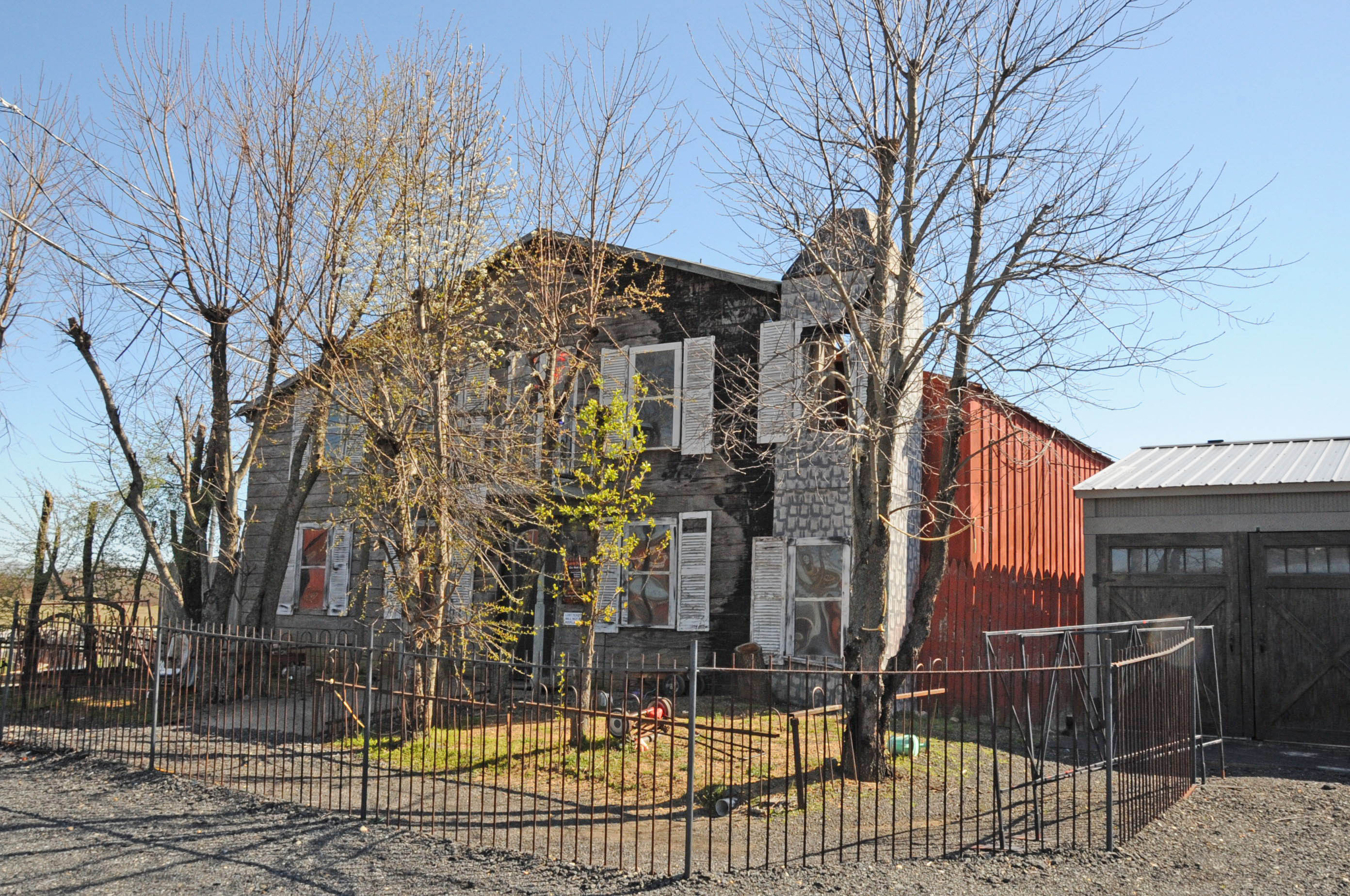

- Location within Delaware Location within the United States
- Location: 1870 DuPont Parkway, Mt. Pleasant, Delaware
- Coordinates: 39.540213°N 75.646950°W
- Area: 2 acres (0.81 ha)
- Built: c. 1845
- Architectural style: Late Victorian, Greek Revival, Federal
- MPS: Rebuilding St. Georges Hundred 1850--1880 TR
- NRHP reference No.: 85002118
- Added to NRHP: September 13, 1985

Idalia Manor is a historic house located at Mt. Pleasant in New Castle County, Delaware, United States. It was built about 1845, and consists of a 2 1/2-story, five-bay, stuccoed brick main house with a two-story, two-bay stuccoed brick gable end kitchen addition. It has a gable roof covered with composition shingle and two endwall chimneys. The house is in the late Federal style. Also on the property are a contributing two-story braced frame granary and crib barn.

It was listed on the National Register of Historic Places in 1985.
