= Charter Oak, Missouri =

Unincorporated community in Stoddard County, Missouri

Coordinates: 36°42′55″N 89°43′11″W

Charter Oak is an unincorporated community in Stoddard County, in the U.S. state of Missouri. A variant spelling was "Charteroak".

== History ==
Charter Oak had its start ca. 1900 when the railroad was extended to that point. The community took its name from the Charteroak Land and Lumber Company. A post office called Charteroak was established in 1902, and remained in operation until 1957.
