= Richland Township, Stoddard County, Missouri =

Township in the US state of Missouri

Coordinates: 36.8356°N 89.7878°W

Richland Township is a township in Stoddard County, in the U.S. state of Missouri.

Richland Township was erected in 1853, and named for their rich soil.
