= Powe, Missouri =

Unincorporated community in Missouri, USA

Coordinates: 36°39′33″N 90°05′48″W

Powe is an unincorporated community in southwest Stoddard County, in the U.S. state of Missouri. The community is on Missouri Route U 2.5 miles east of the St. Francis River and two miles north of the Stoddard-Dunklin county line.

== History ==
A post office called Powe was established in 1904, and remained in operation until 1929. The community has the name of the Powe family, original owners of the town site.
