= Acorn Ridge, Missouri =

Unincorporated community in Missouri, U.S.

Coordinates: 36°54′48″N 90°03′29″W

Acorn Ridge or Acornridge is an unincorporated community in Stoddard County, in the U.S. state of Missouri. The community is on Missouri Route J, approximately seven miles west of Bloomfield.

== History ==
A post office called Acorn Ridge was established in 1860, and remained in operation until 1909. The community was named for the acorn oak timber near the original town site. A variant spelling was "Acornridge".
