= Stoddard County, Missouri =

County in Missouri, United States

- County
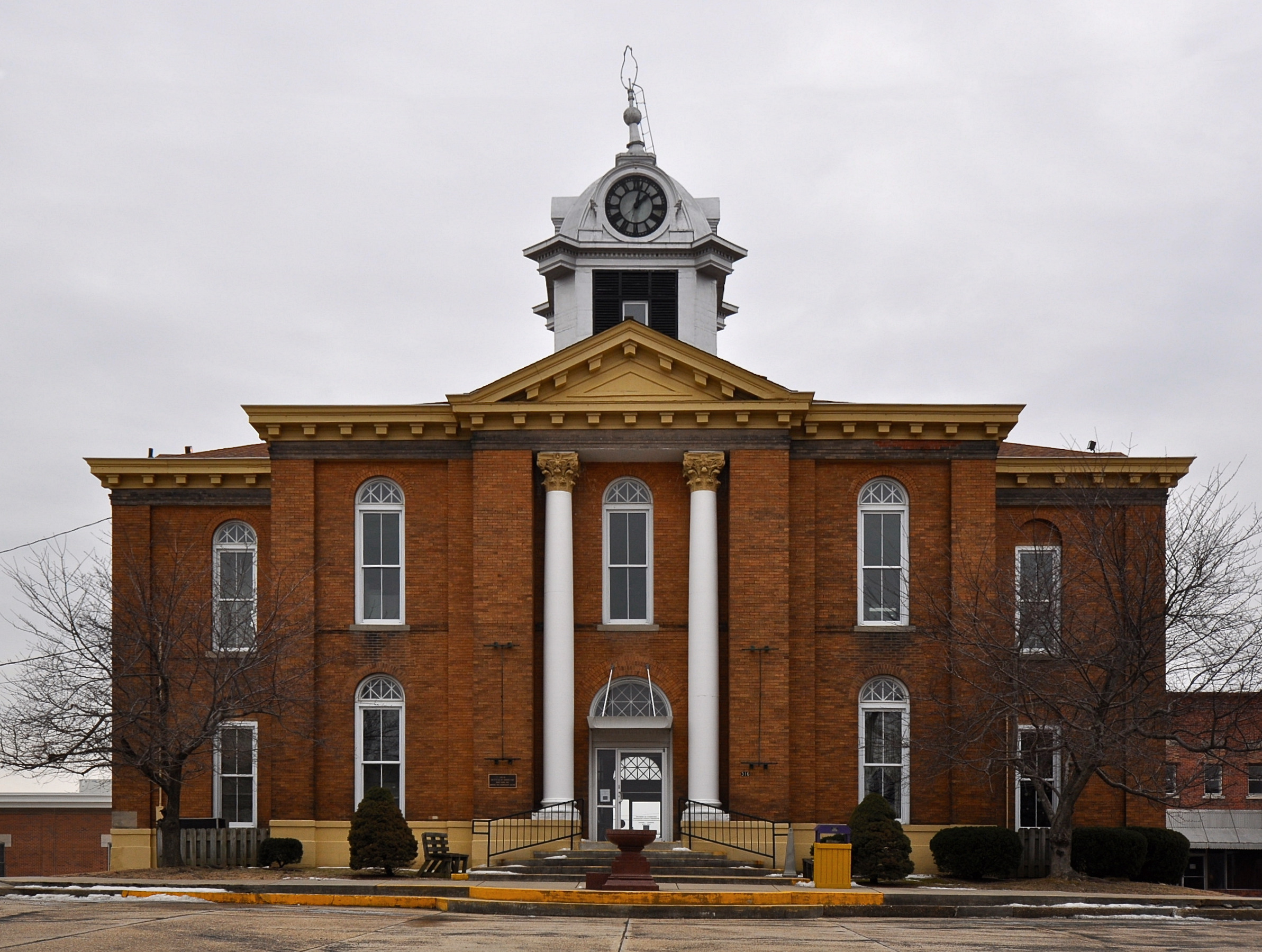
- The Stoddard County Courthouse in Bloomfield

- Location within the U.S. state of Missouri
- Coordinates: 36°52′N 89°57′W
- Country: United States
- State: Missouri
- Founded: January 2, 1835
- Named for: Amos Stoddard
- Seat: Bloomfield
- Largest city: Dexter

Area
  - Total: 829 sq mi (2,150 km^{2})
  - Land: 823 sq mi (2,130 km^{2})
  - Water: 5.8 sq mi (15 km^{2}) 0.7%

Population (2020)
  - Total: 28,672
  - Estimate (2025): 28,284 ▼
  - Density: 34.8/sq mi (13.5/km^{2})
- Time zone: UTC−6 (Central)
  - Summer (DST): UTC−5 (CDT)
- Congressional district: 8th
- Website: stoddardcountyclerk.gov

Stoddard County is a county located in the southeastern portion of the U.S. state of Missouri. As of the 2020 census, the population was 28,672. The county seat is Bloomfield. The county was officially organized on January 2, 1835, and is named for Amos Stoddard, the first American commandant (an early term for "governor") of Upper Louisiana.

== Geography ==
According to the U.S. Census Bureau, the county has a total area of 829 square miles (2,150 km^{2}), of which 823 square miles (2,130 km^{2}) is land and 5.8 square miles (15 km^{2}) (0.7%) is water.

=== Adjacent counties ===
- Bollinger County (north)
- Cape Girardeau County (northeast)
- Scott County (northeast)
- New Madrid County (southeast)
- Dunklin County (south)
- Butler County (southwest)
- Wayne County (northwest)

=== Major highways ===
- Future Interstate 57
- U.S. Route 60
- Route 25
- Route 51
- Route 153

=== National protected area ===
- Mingo National Wildlife Refuge (part)

== Demographics ==
Historical population
Census	Pop.	Note	%±
1840	3,153		—
1850	4,277		35.6%
1860	7,877		84.2%
1870	8,535		8.4%
1880	13,431		57.4%
1890	17,327		29.0%
1900	24,669		42.4%
1910	27,807		12.7%
1920	29,755		7.0%
1930	27,452		−7.7%
1940	33,009		20.2%
1950	33,463		1.4%
1960	29,490		−11.9%
1970	25,771		−12.6%
1980	29,009		12.6%
1990	28,895		−0.4%
2000	29,705		2.8%
2010	29,968		0.9%
2020	28,672		−4.3%
2025 (est.)	28,284	▼	−1.4%
U.S. Decennial Census; 1790-1960 1900-1990; 1990-2000 2010-2020 2020

=== 2020 census ===
As of the 2020 census, the county had a population of 28,672. The median age was 42.2 years, 22.5% of residents were under the age of 18, and 20.5% were 65 years of age or older. For every 100 females there were 96.0 males, and for every 100 females age 18 and over there were 93.4 males age 18 and over.

33.6% of residents lived in urban areas, while 66.4% lived in rural areas.

There were 11,917 households in the county, of which 28.5% had children under the age of 18 living with them and 26.5% had a female householder with no spouse or partner present. About 30.1% of all households were made up of individuals and 14.3% had someone living alone who was 65 years of age or older.

There were 13,402 housing units, of which 11.1% were vacant. Among occupied housing units, 68.9% were owner-occupied and 31.1% were renter-occupied. The homeowner vacancy rate was 2.0% and the rental vacancy rate was 9.2%.

=== 2000 census ===
As of the 2000 census, there were 29,705 people, 12,064 households, and 8,480 families residing in the county. The population density was 36 people per square mile (14 people/km^{2}). There were 13,221 housing units at an average density of 16 units per square mile (6.2/km^{2}). The racial makeup of the county was 97.34% White, 0.91% Black or African American, 0.40% Native American, 0.09% Asian, 0.01% Pacific Islander, 0.24% from other races, and 1.01% from two or more races. Approximately 0.78% of the population were Hispanic or Latino of any race. 38.4% were of American, 15.4% German, 12.4% Irish and 8.5% English ancestry.

There were 12,064 households, out of which 30.50% had children under the age of 18 living with them, 57.40% were married couples living together, 9.40% had a female householder with no husband present, and 29.70% were non-families. 26.60% of all households were made up of individuals, and 13.70% had someone living alone who was 65 years of age or older. The average household size was 2.39 and the average family size was 2.88.

In the county, the population was spread out, with 23.90% under the age of 18, 8.50% from 18 to 24, 26.30% from 25 to 44, 24.10% from 45 to 64, and 17.20% who were 65 years of age or older. The median age was 39 years. For every 100 females there were 92.60 males. For every 100 females age 18 and over, there were 88.20 males.

The median income for a household in the county was $33,120, and the median income for a family was $41,072. Males had a median income of $26,514 versus $17,778 for females. The per capita income for the county was $18,003. About 12.80% of families and 16.50% of the population were below the poverty line, including 20.20% of those under age 18 and 17.60% of those age 65 or over.

=== Racial and ethnic composition ===
The 2020 census reported that the county was 93.6% White, 1.1% Black or African American, 0.3% American Indian and Alaska Native, 0.3% Asian, 0.0% Native Hawaiian and Pacific Islander, 0.7% from some other race, and 4.0% from two or more races, with Hispanic or Latino residents of any race comprising 2.0% of the population.

Stoddard County, Missouri – Racial and ethnic composition Note: the US Census treats Hispanic/Latino as an ethnic category. This table excludes Latinos from the racial categories and assigns them to a separate category. Hispanics/Latinos may be of any race.
Race / Ethnicity (NH = Non-Hispanic)	Pop 1980	Pop 1990	Pop 2000	Pop 2010	Pop 2020	% 1980	% 1990	% 2000	% 2010	% 2020
White alone (NH)	28,158	28,249	28,772	28,931	26,610	97.07%	97.76%	96.86%	96.54%	92.81%
Black or African American alone (NH)	638	408	268	274	298	2.20%	1.41%	0.90%	0.91%	1.04%
Native American or Alaska Native alone (NH)	51	58	111	91	67	0.18%	0.20%	0.37%	0.30%	0.23%
Asian alone (NH)	23	41	28	51	90	0.08%	0.14%	0.09%	0.17%	0.31%
Native Hawaiian or Pacific Islander alone (NH)	x	x	3	2	2	x	x	0.01%	0.01%	0.01%
Other race alone (NH)	6	7	11	3	33	0.02%	0.02%	0.04%	0.01%	0.12%
Mixed race or Multiracial (NH)	x	x	281	260	1,006	x	x	0.95%	0.87%	3.51%
Hispanic or Latino (any race)	133	132	231	356	566	0.46%	0.46%	0.78%	1.19%	1.97%
Total	29,009	28,895	29,705	29,968	28,672	100.00%	100.00%	100.00%	100.00%	100.00%

=== Religion ===
According to the Association of Religion Data Archives County Membership Report (2000), Stoddard County is a part of the Bible Belt with evangelical Protestantism being the majority religion. The most predominant denominations among residents in Stoddard County who adhere to a religion are Southern Baptists (41.4%), Methodists (12.9%), and Pentecostal (8.3%).

== Politics ==
=== Local ===
The Republican Party predominately controls politics at the local level in Stoddard County. Republicans hold ten of the elected positions in the county. In the 2016 election, Sheriff Carl Hefner, who originally ran as a Democrat, switched parties and ran as a Republican.

Stoddard County, Missouri

Elected countywide officials
Assessor	Daniel Creg	Republican
Circuit Clerk	Paula Yancey	Republican
County Clerk	Cecil Weeks	Republican
Commissioner (presiding)	Greg Mathis	Republican
Commissioner (district 1)	Greg Lintz	Republican
Commissioner (district 2)	Carol Jarrell	Republican
Coroner	Brent Stidham	Republican
Prosecuting Attorney	Sawyer Smith	Republican
Public Administrator	Cindy Duckworth	Republican
Recorder	Candy Collier	Republican
Sheriff	Carl Hefner	Republican
Surveyor	Joseph R Pulliam	Republican
Treasurer	Joshua Speakman	Republican

=== State ===
Stoddard County is divided among three legislative districts in the Missouri House of Representatives.

- District 159 – Currently represented by Herman Morse (R-Dexter) and consists of most of the county, including Advance, Bell City, Bloomfield, Dexter, Dudley, and Puxico.

Missouri House of Representatives - District 159 - Stoddard County (2008)
Party	Candidate	Votes	%	±%
Republican	Billy Pat Wright*	5,999	71.33	+8.70
Democratic	Bill Burlison	2,411	28.67	−8.70

- District 161 – Currently represented by Steve Hodges (D-East Prairie) and consists of some of the southeastern portions of the county along the New Madrid County border including Baker, Essex, and Penermon.

Missouri House of Representatives - District 161 - Stoddard County (2008)
Party	Candidate	Votes	%	±%
Republican	Ron McCormick	257	59.49	+59.49
Democratic	Steve Hodges*	175	40.51	−59.49

- District 163 – Currently represented by Kent Hampton (R-Malden) and consists of the southwestern corner along the Dunklin and Butler county lines, including Bernie. Democratic incumbent Tom Todd was defeated by Republican challenger Kent Hampton in 2010.

Missouri House of Representatives - District 163 - Stoddard County (2010)
Party	Candidate	Votes	%	±%
Republican	Kent Hampton	654	63.01	+63.01
Democratic	Tom Todd*	384	36.99	−37.86

All of Stoddard County is a part of Missouri's 25th District in the Missouri Senate and is currently represented by State Senator Rob Mayer (R-Dexter). In 2008, Mayer defeated Democrat M. Shane Stoelting 65.32%-34.68% in the district. The 25th Senatorial District consists of Butler, Dunklin, New Madrid, Pemiscot, Ripley, Stoddard, and Wayne counties.

Missouri Senate - District 25 - Stoddard County (2008)
Party	Candidate	Votes	%	±%
Republican	Rob Mayer	9,894	75.51	
Democratic	M. Shane Stoelting	3,209	24.49	

Past Gubernatorial Elections Results
Year	Republican	Democratic	Third Parties
2024	87.00% 11,683	11.57% 1,554	1.43% 192
2020	84.50% 11,269	13.90% 1,855	1.2% 162
2016	73.80% 9,792	24.00% 3,179	1.0% 127
2012	50.99% 6,514	46.81% 5,980	2.19% 280
2008	52.85% 6,919	45.33% 5,934	1.82% 239
2004	61.63% 8,152	37.35% 4,940	1.03% 136
2000	52.83% 6,537	45.98% 5,689	1.19% 147
1996	39.80% 4,423	58.49% 6,501	1.71% 190
1992	46.69% 5,487	53.31% 6,265	0.00% 0
1988	63.64% 6,634	36.30% 3,784	0.06% 6
1984	59.47% 6,421	40.53% 4,376	0.00% 0
1980	53.42% 6,093	46.54% 5,308	0.04% 5
1976	46.48% 4,617	53.50% 5,315	0.02% 2

=== Federal ===
Stoddard County is included in Missouri's 8th Congressional District and is currently represented by Jason T. Smith (R-Salem) in the U.S. House of Representatives. Smith won a special election on Tuesday, June 4, 2013, to finish out the remaining term of U.S. Representative Jo Ann Emerson (R-Cape Girardeau). Emerson announced her resignation a month after being reelected with over 70 percent of the vote in the district. She resigned to become CEO of the National Rural Electric Cooperative.

U.S. House of Representatives - District 8 – Stoddard County (2012)
Party	Candidate	Votes	%	±%
Republican	Jo Ann Emerson	10,043	78.49	+8.12
Democratic	Jack Rushin	2,381	18.61	−7.42
Libertarian	Rick Vandeven	372	2.91	+1.60

U.S. House of Representatives - District 8 - Special Election – Stoddard County (2013)
Party	Candidate	Votes	%	±%
Republican	Jason T. Smith	1,968	67.33	
Democratic	Steve Hodges	787	26.92	
Constitution	Doug Enyart	87	2.98	
Libertarian	Bill Slantz	41	1.40	
Write-In	Robert W. George	20	0.68	
Write-In	Thomas Brown	20	0.68	

U.S. House of Representatives - District 8 – Stoddard County (2020)
Party	Candidate	Votes	%	±%
Republican	Jason T. Smith	11,316	85.7	
Democratic	Kathy Ellis	1,738	13.2	
Libertarian	Tom Schmitz	155	1.2	

==== Political culture ====
United States presidential election results for Stoddard County, Missouri
Year	Republican		Democratic		Third party(ies)	
Year	No.	%	No.	%	No.	%
1888	1,064	35.41%	1,919	63.86%	22	0.73%
1892	1,218	33.97%	2,220	61.92%	147	4.10%
1896	1,584	34.64%	2,968	64.90%	21	0.46%
1900	1,840	39.78%	2,695	58.26%	91	1.97%
1904	2,088	45.63%	2,265	49.50%	223	4.87%
1908	2,025	39.87%	2,736	53.87%	318	6.26%
1912	1,363	25.94%	2,603	49.54%	1,288	24.51%
1916	2,482	40.63%	3,274	53.59%	353	5.78%
1920	4,641	49.16%	4,428	46.90%	372	3.94%
1924	3,844	44.29%	4,348	50.09%	488	5.62%
1928	4,906	54.81%	4,016	44.87%	29	0.32%
1932	3,234	30.84%	7,139	68.09%	112	1.07%
1936	4,828	42.02%	6,608	57.51%	55	0.48%
1940	6,055	47.24%	6,725	52.47%	38	0.30%
1944	5,079	45.81%	5,982	53.96%	25	0.23%
1948	3,117	30.65%	7,029	69.12%	23	0.23%
1952	5,514	47.33%	6,110	52.45%	25	0.21%
1956	4,832	43.14%	6,369	56.86%	0	0.00%
1960	6,366	54.49%	5,317	45.51%	0	0.00%
1964	3,014	33.65%	5,944	66.35%	0	0.00%
1968	3,919	44.43%	3,150	35.71%	1,751	19.85%
1972	6,282	70.44%	2,636	29.56%	0	0.00%
1976	3,989	39.45%	6,097	60.30%	25	0.25%
1980	6,199	53.85%	5,128	44.54%	185	1.61%
1984	6,701	60.95%	4,294	39.05%	0	0.00%
1988	5,822	55.25%	4,701	44.61%	15	0.14%
1992	4,608	37.44%	5,720	46.47%	1,980	16.09%
1996	5,020	44.92%	4,883	43.69%	1,273	11.39%
2000	7,727	62.04%	4,476	35.94%	251	2.02%
2004	9,242	69.74%	3,946	29.78%	64	0.48%
2008	9,172	69.16%	3,899	29.40%	191	1.44%
2012	9,496	73.81%	3,153	24.51%	217	1.69%
2016	11,079	83.36%	1,876	14.11%	336	2.53%
2020	11,484	85.54%	1,819	13.55%	123	0.92%
2024	11,783	86.65%	1,736	12.77%	80	0.59%

At the presidential level, Stoddard County generally tends to lean Republican. John McCain carried Stoddard County over Barack Obama by more than a two-to-one margin in 2008. George W. Bush also carried Stoddard County twice in 2000 over Al Gore and in 2004 over John Kerry when he received just under 70 percent of the vote. Bill Clinton did manage to carry Stoddard County in 1992 but narrowly lost it in his reelection bid in 1996 to Bob Dole.

Like most rural areas, voters in Stoddard County generally adhere to socially and culturally conservative principles which strongly influence their Republican leanings. In 2004, Missourians voted on a constitutional amendment to define marriage as the union between a man and a woman—it overwhelmingly passed Stoddard County with 88.29 percent of the vote. The initiative passed the state with 71 percent of support from voters as Missouri became the first state to ban same-sex marriage. In 2006, Missourians voted on a constitutional amendment to fund and legalize embryonic stem cell research in the state—it failed in Stoddard County with 60.65 percent voting against the measure. The initiative narrowly passed the state with 51 percent of support from voters as Missouri became one of the first states in the nation to approve embryonic stem cell research. Despite Stoddard County's longstanding tradition of supporting socially conservative platforms, voters in the county have a penchant for advancing populist causes like increasing the minimum wage. In 2006, Missourians voted on a proposition (Proposition B) to increase the minimum wage in the state to $6.50 an hour—it passed Stoddard County with 72.02 percent of the vote. The proposition strongly passed every single county in Missouri with 75.94 percent voting in favor as the minimum wage was increased to $6.50 an hour in the state. During the same election, voters in five other states also strongly approved increases in the minimum wage.

=== Missouri presidential preference primary (2008) ===
In the 2008 presidential primary, voters in Stoddard County from both political parties supported candidates who finished in second place in the state at large and nationally.

Former U.S. Senator Hillary Clinton (D-New York) received more votes, a total of 2,225, than any candidate from either party in Stoddard County during the 2008 presidential primaries.

== Education ==
School districts including sections of the county, no matter how slight, even if the relevant schools and/or administration buildings in another county:

- Advance R-IV School District
- Bell City R-II School District
- Bernie R-XIII School District
- Bloomfield R-XIV School District
- Dexter R-XI School District
- New Madrid County R-I School District
- Puxico R-VIII School District
- Richland R-I School District
- Twin Rivers R-X School District
- Zalma R-V School District

=== Public schools ===
- Advance R-IV School District - Advance
  - Advance Elementary School (K-06)
  - Advance High School (07–12)
- Bell City R-II School District - Bell City
  - Bell City Elementary School (K-06)
  - Bell City High School (07–12)
- Bernie R-XIII School District - Bernie
  - Bernie Elementary School (PK-06)
  - Bernie High School (07–12)
- Bloomfield R-XIV School District - Bloomfield
  - Bloomfield Elementary School (PK-05)
  - Bloomfield Middle School (06–08)
  - Bloomfield High School (09–12)
  - Bloomfield Juvenile Center (03–12)
- Dexter R-XI School District - Dexter
  - Southwest Elementary School (PK-02)
  - Central Elementary School (03–05)
  - T.S. Hill Middle School (06–08)
  - Dexter High School (09–12)
- Puxico R-VIII School District - Puxico
  - Puxico Elementary School (PK-05)
  - Puxico Jr. High School (06–08)
  - Puxico High School (09–12)
  - Mingo Technical High School (12)
- Richland R-I School District - Essex
  - Richland Elementary School (K-06)
  - Richland High School (07–12)

=== Public libraries ===
- Advance Community Library
- Bernie Public Library
- Bloomfield Public Library
- Keller Public Library
- Puxico Public Library

== Communities ==
=== Cities ===
- Advance
- Bell City
- Bernie
- Bloomfield (county seat)
- Dexter
- Dudley
- Essex
- Puxico

=== Villages ===
- Baker
- Penermon

=== Census-designated place ===
- Grayridge

=== Unincorporated communities ===
- Acorn Ridge
- Aid
- Aquilla
- Ardeola
- Asherville
- Avert
- Brownwood
- Buffington
- Bunker Hill
- Charter Oak
- Cobb
- Curdton
- Cyrus
- Durnell
- Frisco
- Guam
- Heagy
- Hunterville
- Idalia
- Idlewild
- Ives
- Kinder
- LaValle
- Leora
- Marco
- Maulsby
- Messler
- Mingo
- Painton
- Powe
- Pyletown
- Redd
- Shawan
- Shreve
- Stoddard
- Swinton
- Tillman
- Toga
- Toppertown
- Zadock

=== Townships ===
- Castor
- Duck Creek
- Elk
- Liberty
- New Lisbon
- Pike
- Richland

== See also ==
- National Register of Historic Places listings in Stoddard County, Missouri
