= National Register of Historic Places listings in Scott County, Missouri =

Location of Scott County in Missouri

This is a list of the National Register of Historic Places listings in Scott County, Missouri.

This is intended to be a complete list of the properties and districts on the National Register of Historic Places in Scott County, Missouri, United States. Latitude and longitude coordinates are provided for many National Register properties and districts; these locations may be seen together in a map.

There are 8 properties and districts listed on the National Register in the county.

This National Park Service list is complete through NPS recent listings posted June 6, 2025.

== Current listings ==
	Name on the Register	Image	Date listed	Location	City or town	Description
1	Charles Isaac and Lizzie Hunter Moore Anderson House	Charles Isaac and Lizzie Hunter Moore Anderson House	June 7, 2006 (#06000473)	203 Washington St. 37°09′54″N 89°27′15″W	Commerce	
2	E.L. Brown Village and Mound Archeological Site		February 12, 1971 (#71000475)	Address Restricted	Diehlstadt	
3	Commerce City Hall	Commerce City Hall	February 2, 2005 (#04001575)	Village Square bordered by Tywappity, Cape Girardeau, Spring, and Washington; 37°09′30″N 89°26′42″W	Commerce	
4	Lincoln School		August 14, 2024 (#100010695)	229 Westgate; 36°52′29″N 89°36′17″W	Sikeston	
5	Marshall Hotel	Marshall Hotel	March 22, 1984 (#84002715)	103 E. Malone Ave. 36°52′33″N 89°35′19″W	Sikeston	
6	Sandy Woods Settlement Archeological Site		March 4, 1971 (#71000476)	Western side of the North Cut Ditch, 1.5 miles (2.4 km) west of Diehlstadt; 36°57′28″N 89°27′28″W	Diehlstadt	
7	Scott County Courthouse	Scott County Courthouse	January 28, 2004 (#03001505)	131 S. Winchester St. 37°05′48″N 89°33′50″W	Benton	
8	Sikeston St. Louis, Iron Mountain and Southern Railway Depot	Sikeston St. Louis, Iron Mountain and Southern Railway Depot	December 28, 2000 (#00001549)	Front St. between Scott and New Madrid Sts. 36°52′35″N 89°35′23″W	Sikeston	

== See also ==
- List of National Historic Landmarks in Missouri
- National Register of Historic Places listings in Missouri
