= Sikeston Ridge =

Ridge in Missouri, U.S.

Sikeston Ridge is a two-mile (3 km) wide topographic terrace with an average height of 20 feet (6.1 m) deposited by the Mississippi River. It was formed when the Mississippi River flowed west of Sikeston, United States. This Southeast Missouri ridge runs from the area of Haywood City south through Sikeston towards the Mississippi River town of New Madrid, Missouri. The most dominant ridge in the area is Crowley's Ridge which is 150 miles (240 km) long and with an average height of 400 feet (120 m).

In 1789, the King of Spain ordered that an overland route be laid out to connect the cities of St. Louis and New Orleans. The high ground from the Sikeston Ridge was used as the location for a small stretch of this road.

Before the surrounding swampland was drained, this ridge was an important strategic location in the early days of the American Civil War.

== Origin ==
Sikeston Ridge was once mapped as a part of the early to middle Wisconsin Valley Train. Further observations and studies in the area found that the surface deposits on and around the ridge consist of medium to fine sand, muddy sand, and sandy mud. This finding showed that the loess cap was very thin, leading geomorphologists to believe the ridge was much younger than previously thought. After this discovery, they suggested the fluvial sands on the ridge were deposited during the Peoria Loess deposition. This is consistent with Sikeston Ridge being a remnant of the late Wisconsin Valley Train. The fluvial deposits on Sikeston Ridge and more surfaces downstream match up and have been interpreted as a part of the same late Wisconsin full glacial and early late glacial valley train course. The relative ages of the terraces in the area were determined by coring and by comparing the heights of the terraces. Surfaces with very little loess covering indicate that they were formed in the full glacial to early late glacial period.

While the relative age of the ridge has been agreed upon, it still remains unclear whether the sediment underlying Sikeston Ridge and the corresponding surfaces were deposited by the Ohio or Mississippi River. Slackwater facies, which are mostly clay and silt carried as suspended load and deposited from floodwaters backfilled into the system, found in the area suggest that the Mississippi River was actively aggrading during the late Wisconsin full glacial period and that Sikeston Ridge represents a valley train constructed by the Mississippi River flowing through the Bell City–Oran Gap. Valley train surfaces to the east of Sikeston Ridge may have resulted from deposition by the Ohio River.

Sikeston Ridge was also thought to have tectonic origins because of its orientation in the New Madrid Seismic Zone. Trenching, drilling, and satellite imaging along the western scarp of Sikeston ridge showed slight subsurface deformation of less than 0.25 m, which is negligible compared to the 3 to 5 m height of the ridge at the spots where data was collected. Sikeston Ridge has been determined to have been erosional in origin and has been associated with colluvial deposition and channel incision during the latest Wisconsin glacial period, during the Pleistocene. Scalloped patterns along the ridge margins point towards erosional trimming in the past.

== Location ==
Sikeston Ridge is a prominent topographic feature of the in southeastern Missouri. It is located within the New Madrid Seismic Zone, but it is not tectonic in origin.

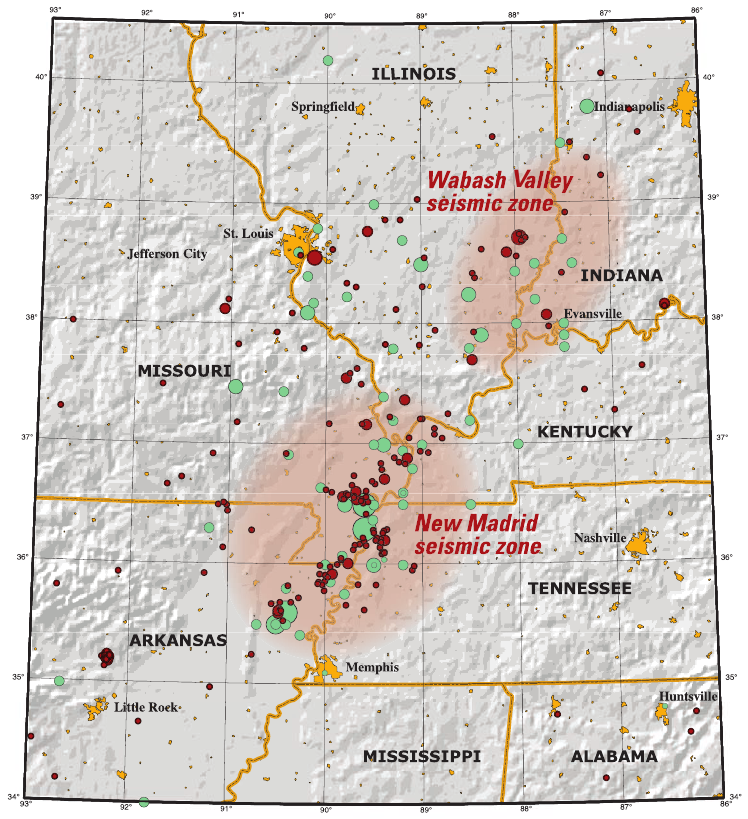
Map of New Madrid Seismic Zone

The Geographic Names Information System (GNIS) provides three location points running along the ridge:

- 36°53′42″N 89°35′16″W
- 36°48′50″N 89°34′29″W
- 36°43′21″N 89°31′30″W

== See also ==
- Crowley's Ridge
- Headwater Diversion Channel
- Little River (St. Francis River)
