= St. Louis, Iron Mountain and Southern Railroad Depot =

St. Louis, Iron Mountain and Southern Railroad Depot may refer to

- Any railroad station built by the St. Louis, Iron Mountain and Southern Railway

or specific notable ones

(by state then city)

- Glenwood Iron Mountain Railroad Depot, Glenwood, AR, listed on the NRHP in Arkansas
- St. Louis, Iron Mountain and Southern Railroad Depot (Olyphant, Arkansas)
- St. Louis, Iron Mountain and Southern Railroad Depot (Fredericktown, Missouri), listed on the NRHP in Missouri
- St. Louis, Iron Mountain and Southern Railroad Depot (Gad's Hill, Missouri)
- St. Louis, Iron Mountain and Southern Railroad Depot (Jackson, Missouri)
- St. Louis, Iron Mountain and Southern Railroad Depot (Poplar Bluff, Missouri), listed on the NRHP in Missouri
- Sikeston St. Louis, Iron Mountain and Southern Railway Depot, Sikeston, MO, listed on the NRHP in Missouri
