= Bell City, Missouri =

- City
- Nickname: The town of bell
- Location of Bell City, Missouri
- Coordinates: 37°01′25″N 89°49′10″W
- Country: United States
- State: Missouri
- County: Stoddard

Area
  - Total: 0.56 sq mi (1.44 km^{2})
  - Land: 0.55 sq mi (1.43 km^{2})
  - Water: 0.0039 sq mi (0.01 km^{2})
- Elevation: 331 ft (101 m)

Population (2020)
  - Total: 464
  - Density: 843.1/sq mi (325.53/km^{2})
- Time zone: UTC-6 (Central (CST))
  - Summer (DST): UTC-5 (CDT)
- ZIP code: 63735
- Area code: 573
- FIPS code: 29-04132
- GNIS feature ID: 2394109

Bell City is a city in northeastern Stoddard County, Missouri, United States. It was founded as a sawmill town circa 1900, and lies at the foothills of Crowley's Ridge on Missouri Route 91. The population was 464 at the 2020 census. Dorothy Burton is the current mayor.

== History ==
A post office called Bell City has been in operation since 1890. The community was named after brothers Gesper Albert and Ralford Stephen Bell, proprietors of a local sawmill. Bell City was situated along the St. Louis Southwestern Railway.

== Geography ==
Bell City is located on the western edge of the lowland region of southeast Missouri. Sikeston lies 15 miles to the southeast. The head of Little River is three miles to the east. Missouri Route 91 passes through the community, connecting with U.S. Route 61 at Morley, ten miles to the east.

According to the United States Census Bureau, the city has a total area of 0.55 square miles (1.42 km^{2}), all land.

== Demographics ==
Historical population
Census	Pop.	Note	%±
1900	100		—
1910	316		216.0%
1930	256		—
1940	300		17.2%
1950	482		60.7%
1960	409		−15.1%
1970	424		3.7%
1980	539		27.1%
1990	469		−13.0%
2000	461		−1.7%
2010	448		−2.8%
2020	464		3.6%
U.S. Decennial Census

=== 2010 census ===
As of the census of 2010, there were 448 people, 182 households, and 124 families living in the city. The population density was 814.5 inhabitants per square mile (314.5/km^{2}). There were 212 housing units at an average density of 385.5 per square mile (148.8/km^{2}). The racial makeup of the city was 94.64% White, 1.79% Black or African American, 1.34% Native American, and 2.23% from two or more races. Hispanic or Latino of any race were 0.22% of the population.

There were 182 households, of which 37.4% had children under the age of 18 living with them, 47.3% were married couples living together, 12.6% had a female householder with no husband present, 8.2% had a male householder with no wife present, and 31.9% were non-families. 26.9% of all households were made up of individuals, and 12.6% had someone living alone who was 65 years of age or older. The average household size was 2.46 and the average family size was 2.98.

The median age in the city was 36.6 years. 25% of residents were under the age of 18; 11.7% were between the ages of 18 and 24; 25.3% were from 25 to 44; 26.1% were from 45 to 64; and 12.1% were 65 years of age or older. The gender makeup of the city was 50.7% male and 49.3% female.

=== 2000 census ===
As of the census of 2000, there were 461 people, 196 households, and 126 families living in the city. The population density was 830.9 inhabitants per square mile (320.8/km^{2}). There were 220 housing units at an average density of 396.5 per square mile (153.1/km^{2}). The racial makeup of the city was 98.48% White, 1.08% African American, 0.22% Native American, and 0.22% from two or more races. Hispanic or Latino of any race were 0.87% of the population.

There were 196 households, out of which 36.2% had children under the age of 18 living with them, 45.4% were married couples living together, 15.3% had a female householder with no husband present, and 35.7% were non-families. 34.2% of all households were made up of individuals, and 13.8% had someone living alone who was 65 years of age or older. The average household size was 2.35 and the average family size was 3.02.

In the city the population was spread out, with 28.9% under the age of 18, 8.9% from 18 to 24, 27.5% from 25 to 44, 21.5% from 45 to 64, and 13.2% who were 65 years of age or older. The median age was 35 years. For every 100 females, there were 85.1 males. For every 100 females age 18 and over, there were 77.3 males.

The median income for a household in the city was $23,125, and the median income for a family was $28,636. Males had a median income of $22,125 versus $16,333 for females. The per capita income for the city was $12,664. About 11.8% of families and 19.4% of the population were below the poverty line, including 27.1% of those under age 18 and 23.7% of those age 65 or over.

== Education ==
It is in the Bell City R-II School District.

== Notable people ==
- Dave Barham - Founded Hot Dog on a Stick
