= Spudich =

Spudich is a surname. Notable people with the surname include:

- James Spudich, American biochemist
- Josef Spudich (1908–2001), American football player
