= Saveloy =

Type of sausage

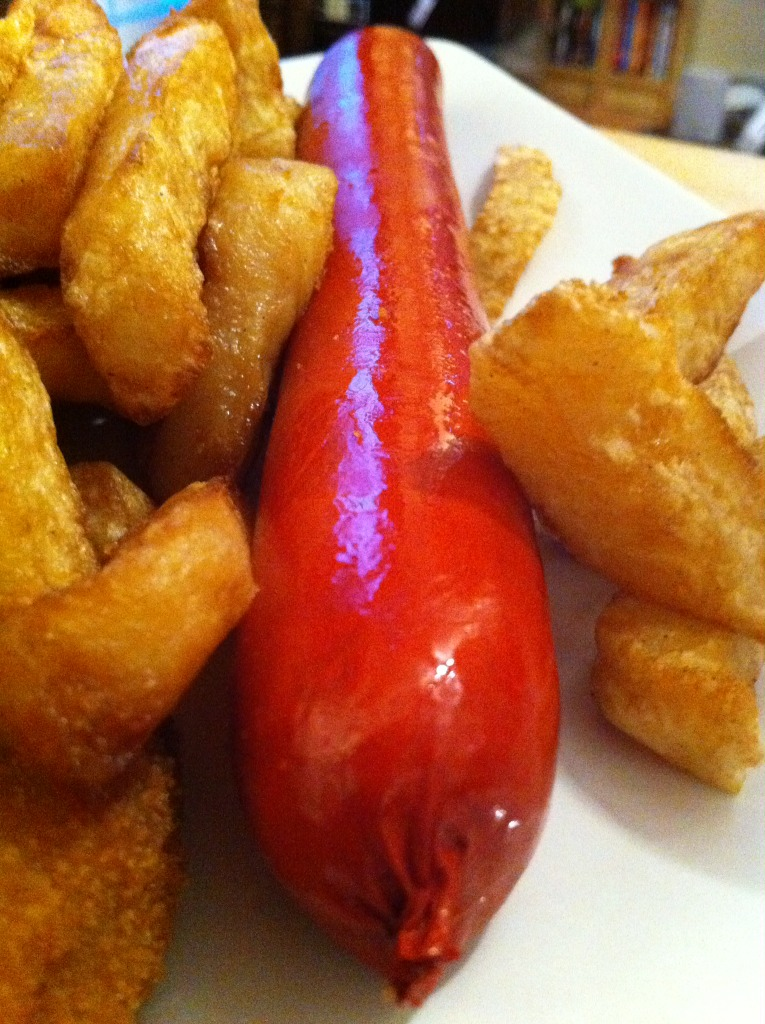
A saveloy served with chips in England

A saveloy is a type of highly seasoned sausage, usually bright red, normally boiled and available in fish and chip shops around Britain. It is sometimes also available fried in batter.

== Etymology ==
The word is believed to be derived from Middle French cervelas or servelat, originating from Old Italian cervella ('pigs brains'), ultimately from the Latin cerebrum ('brain'). Its first known use in the English language in this meaning was 1784. Cervellato is still the name of a sausage in Italy; it is longer and thinner than standard Italian sausages.

== Ingredients ==
The saveloy was traditionally made from pig brains. The ingredients of a shop-bought sausage are typically pork (58%), water, rusk, pork fat, potato starch, salt, emulsifiers (tetrasodium diphosphate, disodium diphosphate), white pepper, spices, dried sage, preservatives (sodium nitrite, potassium nitrate), and beef collagen casing dyed with red food colouring.

The saveloy is mostly eaten with chips.

== England and Wales ==
Popular in the northeast but uncommon in the northwest of England, saveloys are sometimes eaten in a "saveloy dip" sandwich: the bun is dipped in the water in which the saveloy has been boiled, or in gravy, with a layer of stuffing and pease pudding, seasoned with English mustard.

Elsewhere in England, particularly London, and Wales, saveloy is most commonly served in fish and chip shops. In London, the shortened term “Sav” is colloquially used to refer to saveloys.

== Australia and New Zealand ==
The saveloy is eaten in Australia and New Zealand, often dipped in batter and deep fried, when it is known as a Dagwood Dog.

In 1913, the saveloy was described in an Australian court case as a "highly seasoned dry sausage originally made of brains, but now young pork, salted". In 1951, it was commonly defined by its size as a 19 cm (7.5 in) sausage, as opposed to a frankfurter at 26 cm (10 in). This distinction may be due to frankfurters’ popularisation in Australia, as the main ingredient in hot dogs. Saveloys also tend to have more seasoning and are thicker.

In Australia, saveloys are usually a beef-pork blend. As in England, they are sold at fish-and-chip shops, and bought from supermarkets, to be simmered at home.

Saveloys are often the basis of the New Zealand battered-sausage-on-a-stick "hot dog", very similar to the US corn meal-battered variant of the corn dog sold at fairgrounds and shows. The Australian showground version is often called a "dagwood dog", when prepared on site. It should not be confused with the "pluto pup", equivalent to the US Pronto Pup, a mass-produced, pre-prepared product that is essentially the same, but which invariably uses frankfurters, rather than saveloys and can often be found at takeaway shops.

A cocktail sausage is a smaller version of the saveloy, about a quarter of the size, in Australia sometimes called a "baby sav", a "footy frank" or a "little boy", and in New Zealand and Queensland called a "cheerio". These are a popular children's party food in New Zealand and Australia, often served hot, with tomato sauce.

== See also ==
- Battered sausage
- List of sausages
