= Commerce City Hall =

- U.S. National Register of Historic Places
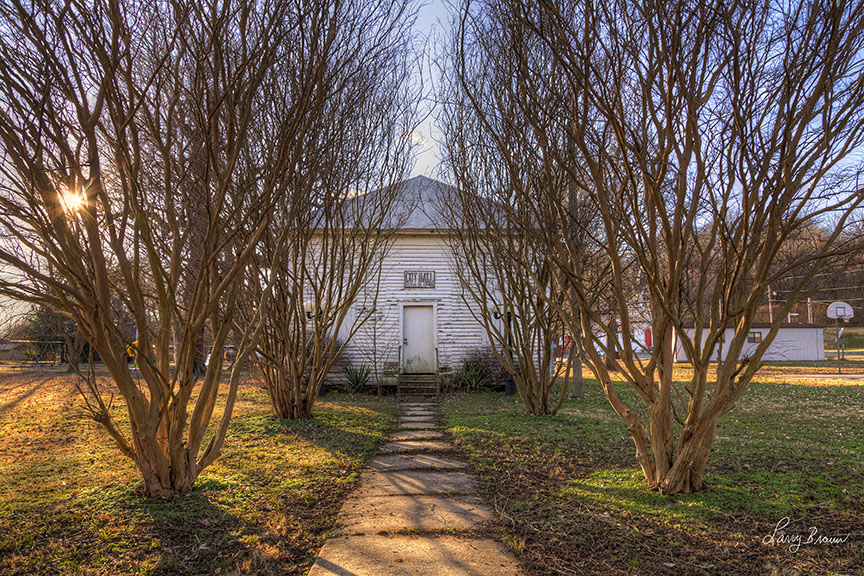
- Commerce City Hall, January 2017

- Location within Missouri Location within the United States
- Location: Village Square bordered by Tywappity, Cape Girardeau, Spring and Washington, Commerce, Missouri
- Coordinates: 37°9′30″N 89°26′42″W
- Area: less than one acre
- Built: 1896
- Architectural style: One-room government building
- NRHP reference No.: 04001575
- Added to NRHP: February 2, 2005

Commerce City Hall is a historic city hall located at Commerce, Scott County, Missouri. It was built about 1896, and is a one-story, one room, frame building measuring 26 feet by 50 feet. It has a hipped roof and sits on a brick and concrete pier foundation.

It was added to the National Register of Historic Places in 2004.
