= Brandon Barnes (linebacker) =

American football player (born 1981)

No. 51
- Position: Linebacker

Personal information
- Born: June 12, 1981 (age 45); Sikeston, Missouri, U.S.

Career information
- College: Missouri
- NFL draft: 2004: undrafted

Career history
- Baltimore Ravens (2004)*; Washington Redskins (2004)
- * Offseason or practice squad member only

Career NFL statistics
- Tackles: 7
- Sacks: 0
- Forced fumbles: 0
- Stats at Pro Football Reference

Brandon Edward Barnes (born June 12, 1981) is an American former professional football player who was a linebacker in the National Football League (NFL). He played college football for the Missouri Tigers and was signed by the Baltimore Ravens as an undrafted free agent in 2004.

Barnes also played for the Washington Redskins.
