= Battered sausage =

Savoury fried meat dish from Britain

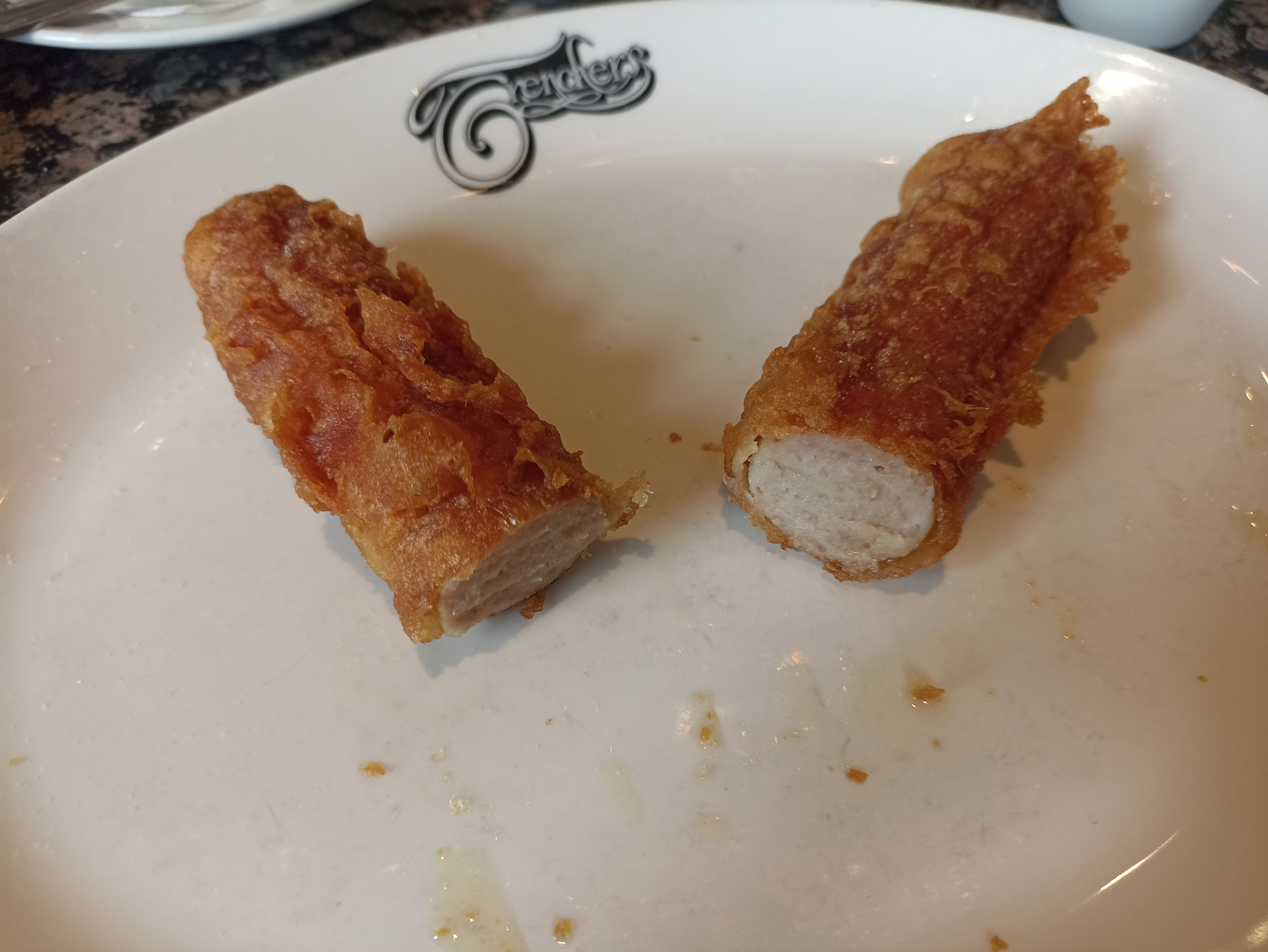
- A battered sausage, sliced in half after cooking
- Type: Sausage
- Place of origin: United Kingdom
- Associated cuisine: British
- Main ingredients: Sausage
- Ingredients generally used: Egg, flour, water

Battered sausages are a type of sausage found all across the United Kingdom, Australia and New Zealand.

== British battered sausage ==
The battered sausage is a standard menu item in fish and chip shops across the United Kingdom often described as an "essential" staple of the fish and chip shop menu. They are made up of a pork sausage dipped in batter (usually the same batter used to batter fish), and usually served with chips. A meal of battered sausage and chips is usually known as a 'battered sausage supper' in Scotland.

== Australia and New Zealand ==
In Australia, it may be referred to as a "battered sav". This may also have given rise to the local expression "fair suck of the sav". In New Zealand, they can be found either with or without a stick inserted (similar to a corn dog). In Australia if served with the stick, it is referred to as a "pluto pup" or "dagwood dog" and usually dipped in a generous amount of tomato sauce.

== See also ==
- List of maize dishes
- List of sausage dishes
- List of sausages
- Corn dog
- Red pudding
