= Corn dog =

Deep-fried, corn-battered hot dog on a stick

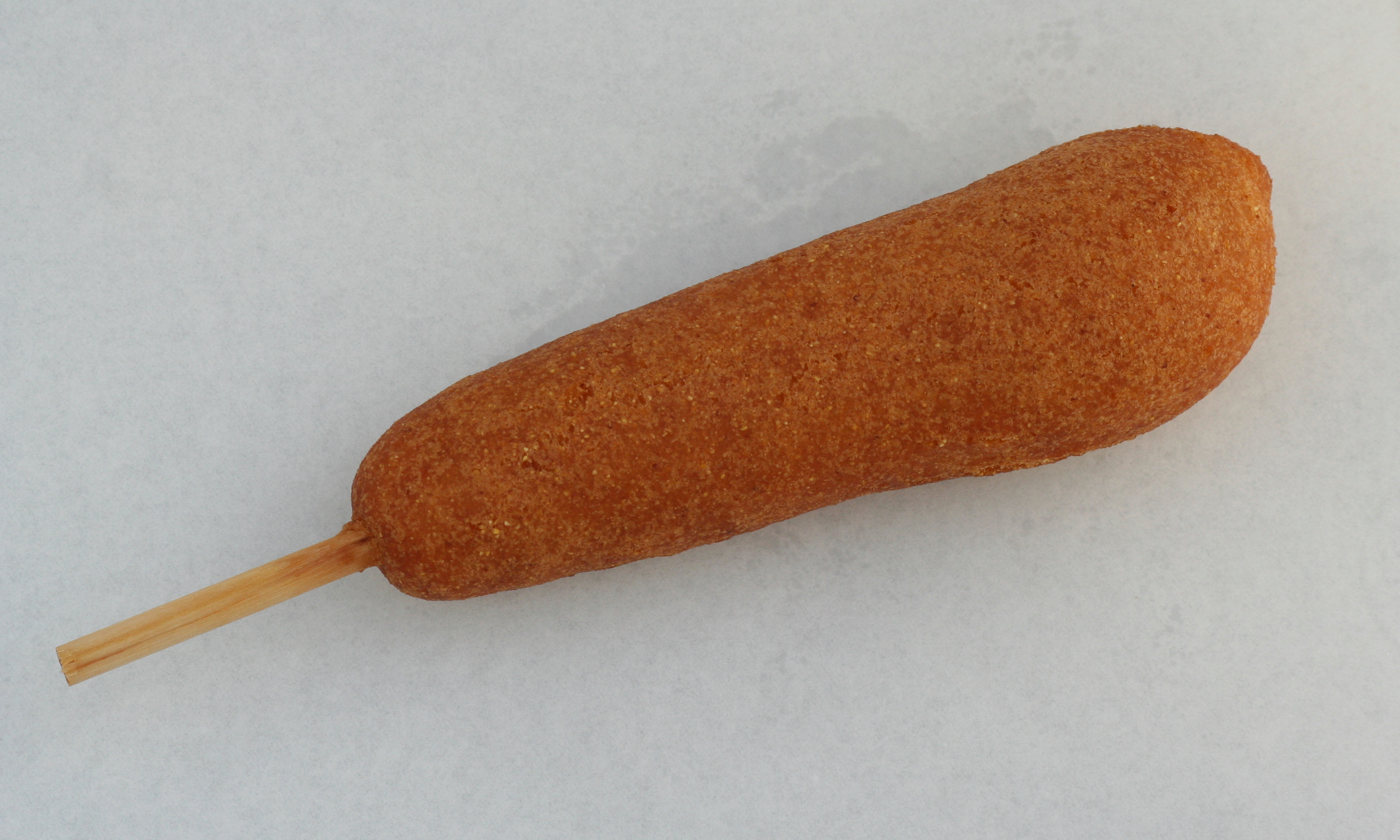
- Place of origin: United States
- Created by: Disputed (in current form, circa late 1930s – early 1940s)
- Main ingredients: Wiener, cornmeal batter
- Variations: >100
- Food energy (per serving): 263–600 (depending on type)

A corn dog (also spelled corndog and also known by several other names) is a hot dog sausage on a stick that has been coated in a thick layer of cornmeal batter and deep fried. It originated in the United States and is commonly found in American cuisine.

== Name variations ==
In Canada, corn dogs are often called "Pogos" after the popular brand produced by Conagra.

In Australia, where they have become a popular food at agricultural shows and carnivals, they are known as either "Pluto pups", "Dagwood dogs", "dippy dogs" or (historically) "pronto pups". The name "Pluto pup" likely derives from the Disney character Pluto, who is a dog. "Dagwood dog" is derived from the name of a character from the American comic strip Blondie, which was created in 1930. In the comic strip, Dagwood, Blondie's husband, has a dog named Daisy. Historically the name "pronto pup" was originally used as a brand name in the United States in 1941, although this name had become obsolete as early as 1949 and was replaced by the name "Pluto pup". Some have suggested that Pluto pups are made in factories, while Dagwood dogs are prepared on site.

In France, the term beignet de saucisse is used, which literally translates to "sausage donut".

In Japanese, the most common name for them is "American dog" (アメリカンドッグ, amerikan doggu).

In New Zealand, the name "hot dog" or "mini hot dog" is often used.

== History ==
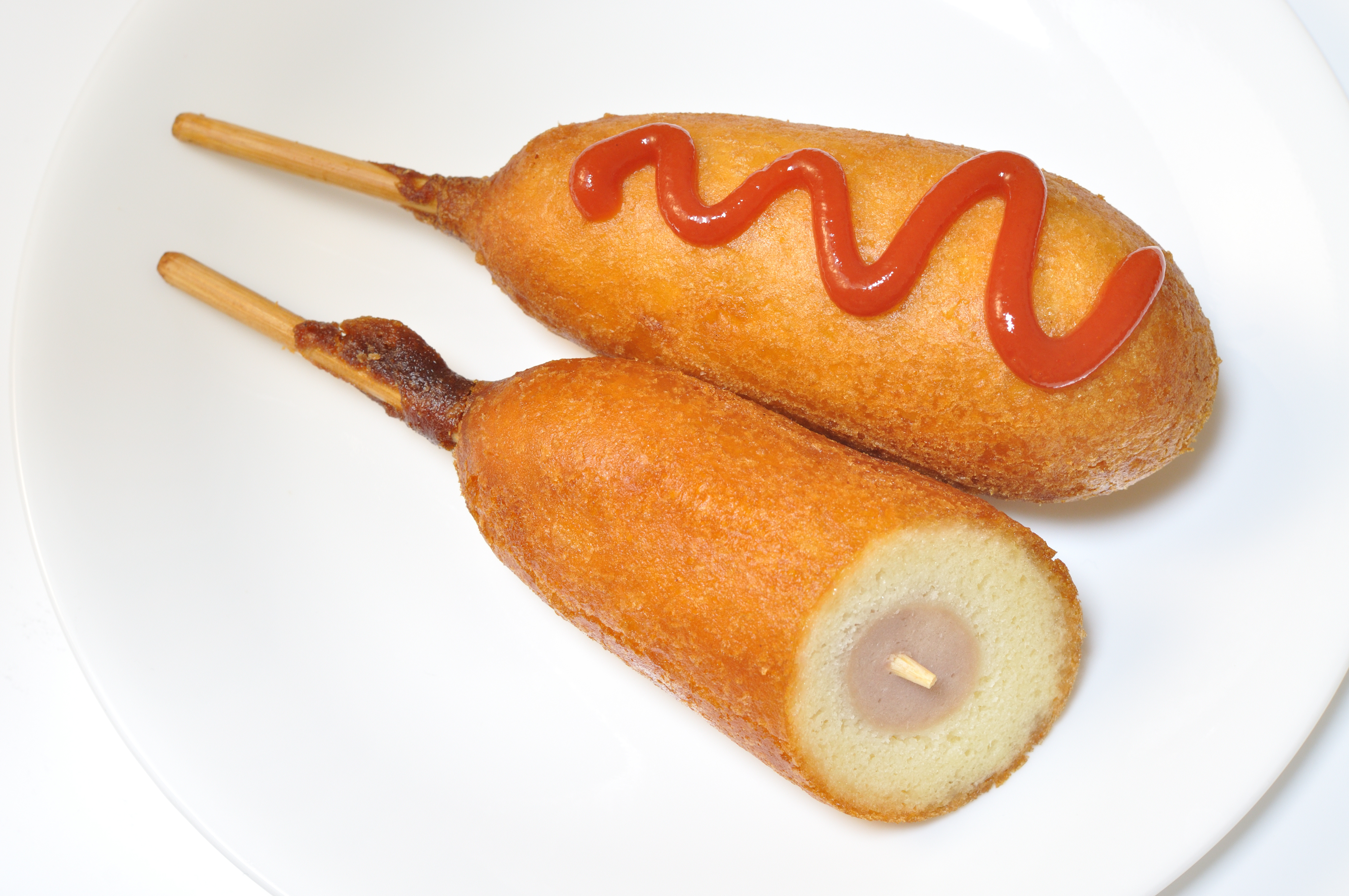
Corn dogs, with cross-section

German immigrants in Texas, who were sausage-makers finding resistance to the sausages they used to make, have been credited with introducing the corn dog to the United States, though the serving stick came later. A US patent filed in 1927, granted in 1929, for a Combined Dipping, Cooking, and Article Holding Apparatus, describes corn dogs, among other fried food impaled on a stick; it reads in part:

I have discovered that articles of food such, for instance, as wieners, boiled ham, hard boiled eggs, cheese, sliced peaches, pineapples, bananas and like fruit, and cherries, dates, figs, strawberries, etc., when impaled on sticks and dipped in batter, which includes in its ingredients a self rising flour, and then deep fried in a vegetable oil at a temperature of about 390 °F [200 °C], the resultant food product on a stick for a handle is a clean, wholesome and tasty refreshment.

A "Krusty Korn Dog" baker machine appeared in the 1926 Albert Pick-Barth wholesale catalog of hotel and restaurant supplies. The "korn dogs" were baked in a corn batter and resembled ears of corn when cooked.

A number of current corn dog vendors claim responsibility for the invention or popularization of the corn dog. Carl and Neil Fletcher lay such a claim, having introduced their "Corny Dogs" at the State Fair of Texas sometime between 1938 and 1942. Pronto Pup of Rockaway Beach, Oregon, claims to have invented the corn dog in 1939. Cozy Dog Drive-in, in Springfield, Illinois, claims to have been the first to serve corn dogs on sticks, on June 16, 1946. Also in 1946, Dave Barham opened the first location of Hot Dog on a Stick at Muscle Beach in Santa Monica, California.

== Preparation ==
Corn dogs are often served as street food or fast food. For the best and freshest preparation, some vendors or restaurateurs dip and fry their corn dogs just before serving. Some corn dog purveyors sell pre-made frozen corn dogs, which are then thawed and fried again, or browned in an oven.

Corn dogs can also be found at almost any supermarket and convenience store in North America as frozen foods as well as served hot and ready to eat. Pre-made frozen corn dogs can also be heated in a microwave oven, but the cornbread coating will lack its normal crispy texture.

Popular condiments for corn dogs include ketchup, mustard, and honey.

== Variations ==
One cheesy variation is prepared either with melted cheese between the hot dog and the breading or by using a cheese-filled hot dog.

Another version is the "cornbrat" (or "corn brat"), which is a corn dog made with bratwurst instead of a hot dog.

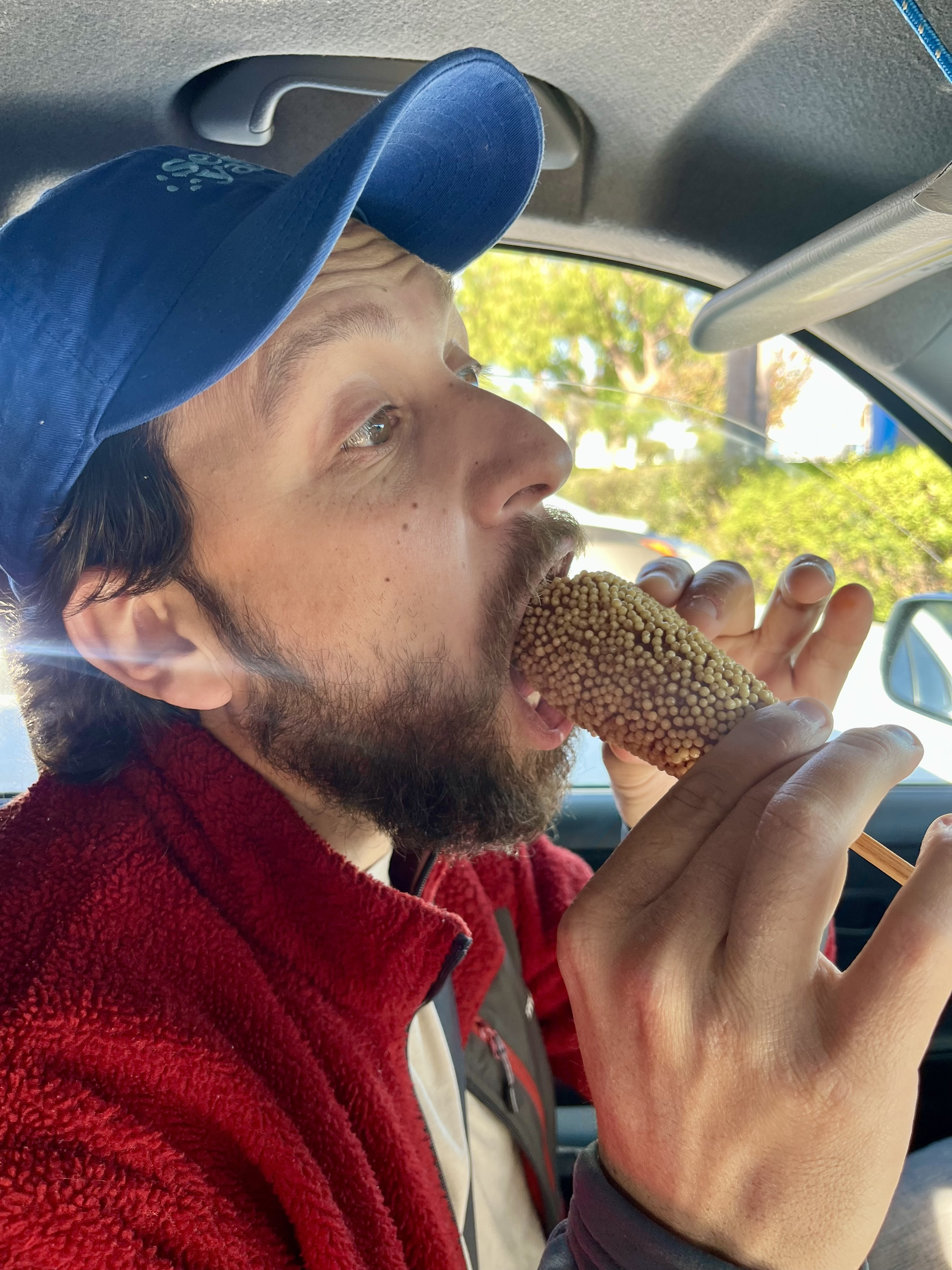
Person eating Korean variation, with puffed rice

Small corn dogs, known as "corn puppies", "mini corn dogs", or "corn dog nuggets", are a variation served in some restaurants, generally on the children's menu or at fast food establishments. A serving includes multiple pieces, usually 10. In contrast to their larger counterparts, corn puppies are normally served stickless as finger food.

A breakfast version of the corn dog features a breakfast sausage in place of the hot dog, and pancake batter in place of the cornmeal. This variation is commonly called a "pancake on a stick". It was formerly served by the drive-in restaurant Sonic, but it is now made by companies such as Jimmy Dean.

Both vegetarian corn dogs and corn dog nuggets are made as meatless alternatives by many of the same companies that produce vegetarian hot dogs.

=== By country ===
==== Argentina ====
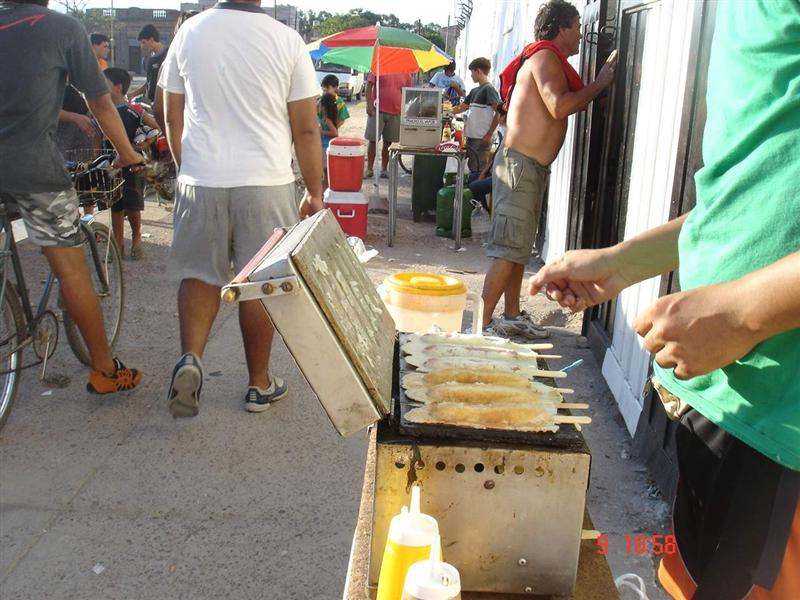
Panchukers in Argentina

In Argentina, a panchuker (or panchuque, pancho chino) is a hot snack that can be bought near some train stations and in some places of heavy pedestrian transit. They are more popular in the inner country cities. A panchuker consists of a sausage covered with a waffle-like pastry, and has a stick in it (like a corn dog) so that it can be easily consumed. Some versions contain cheese, and sauces may be served to accompany them. Some variations may be found in Uruguay and other South American countries. Generally, panchukers are offered as a low-price fast food and can only be seen at certain places of the inner country—like the cities of La Plata, Villa Albertina, and Cipoletti—and, in Buenos Aires, they can be found in Barrio Chino and Belgrano. They are particularly popular in certain regions in the Northwest, such as the province of Tucumán.

==== Australia ====
In Australia, a hot dog sausage on a stick, deep-fried in batter, is known as a Dagwood Dog, Pluto Pup, or Dippy Dog, depending on region. Variants use wheat-based or corn-based batters. These are not to be confused with the Australian battered sav, a saveloy deep fried in a wheat flour-based batter, as used for fish and chips, which generally does not contain cornmeal.

They are popular at agricultural shows and carnivals, such as the Sydney Royal Easter Show.

==== Canada ====
In Quebec, Ontario, New Brunswick, and Newfoundland and Labrador, a battered hot dog on a stick is called a "pogo" and is traditionally eaten with ordinary yellow mustard, sometimes referred to as "ballpark mustard". The rest of Canada refers to them by the non-trademarked term "corn dog". It is named after the trademarked name of a Conagra frozen product available in all of the country since the 1960s but whose main market is the province of Quebec.

==== Japan ====
In Japan, the equivalent food is usually called an "American dog" (アメリカンドッグ) based on the idea of where the food is thought to originate. The batter is usually made with wheat flour, and fish sausage may be used. In eastern regions of Hokkaido, a variant with granulated sugar instead of usual ketchup topping is called "French dog" (フレンチドッグ).

==== New Zealand ====
A New Zealand Hot Dog is invariably a deep-fried battered saveloy or pre-cooked sausage on a stick that is then usually dipped in tomato sauce (ketchup). The saveloy or sausage used is thicker than a frankfurter, and is coated in a thinner batter layer than American corn dogs. The batter can be cornmeal based or corn flour based. The distinction is not commonly enforced. The sausage in a bun that is called a hot dog in other countries is known as an "American Hot Dog" and is usually available at the same locations. If a further descriptor is needed to avoid confusion between the two, the New Zealand standard hot dog can be described as a hot dog on a stick.

==== South Africa ====
In South Africa, a corn dog is a popular cafe/fair food. A corn dog is usually called "Yankee" in the Afrikaans language. It is usually served with a sweet pink sauce made from a mixture of mayonnaise, tomato sauce and condensed milk. Different varieties of frozen corn dogs are sold in South African grocery and convenience stores.

==== South Korea ====
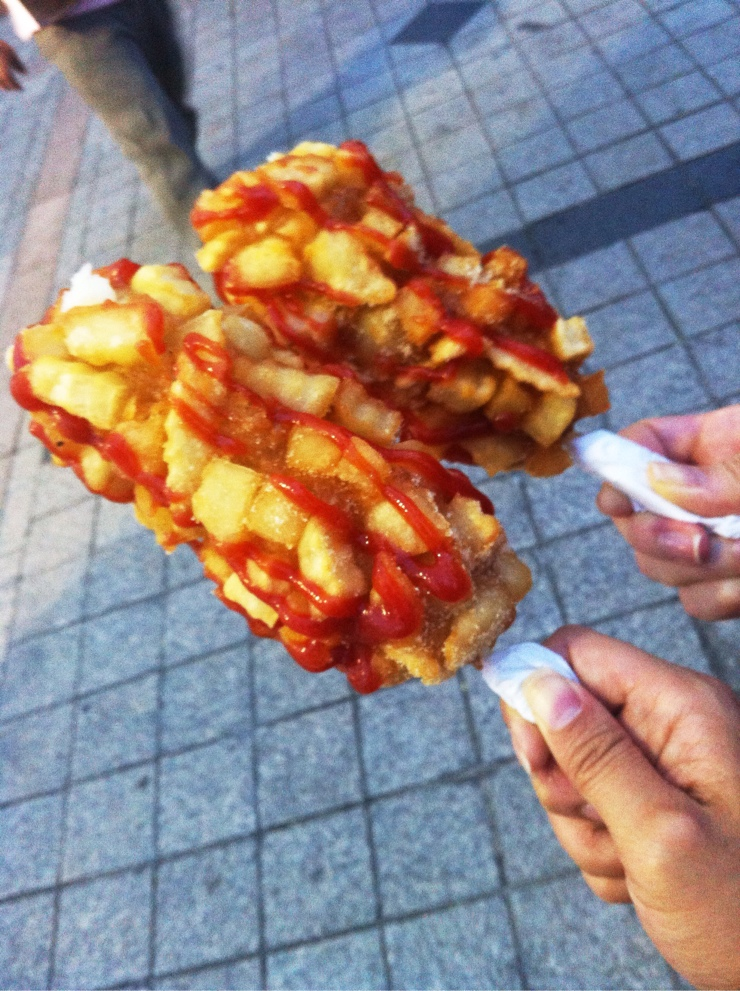
A French fry–encrusted corn dog can also have ramen on it and is sold at the Heunginjimun in South Korea

In South Korea, corn dogs are one of the most popular street foods. Corn dogs are usually called "hot dog" in the Korean language (핫도그), creating confusion with a genuine hot dog. A French fry–encrusted corn dog, or "Kogo", has especially attracted the attention of Western visitors, including vegans (using vegan hot dogs).

== Annual celebration ==
National Corndog Day is a United States celebration of the corn dog, tater tots, basketball, and American beer that occurs on the first Saturday of March Madness every year.

== Gallery ==
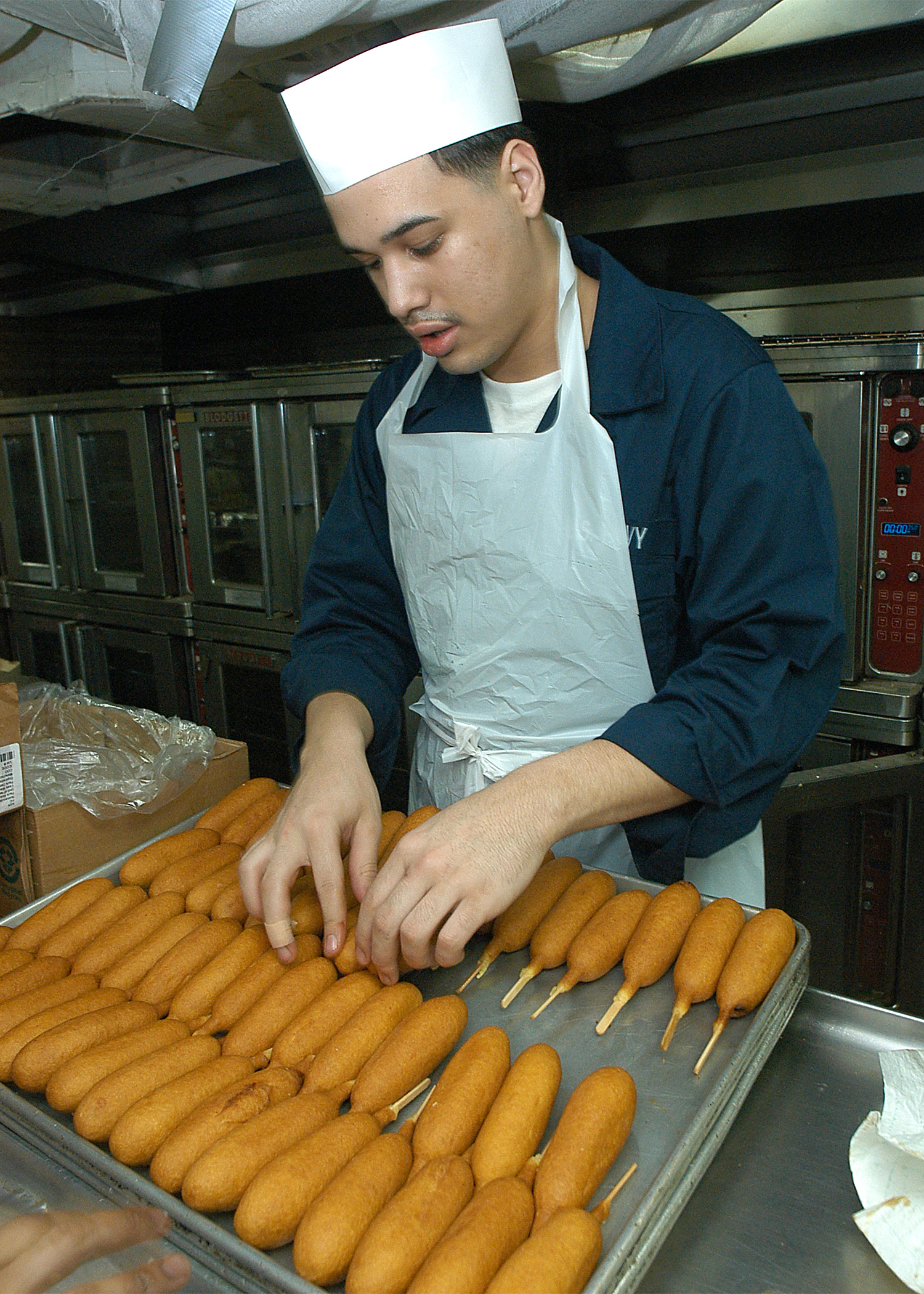
A sailor aboard the USS George Washington places corn dogs on a tray to be baked in the galley.

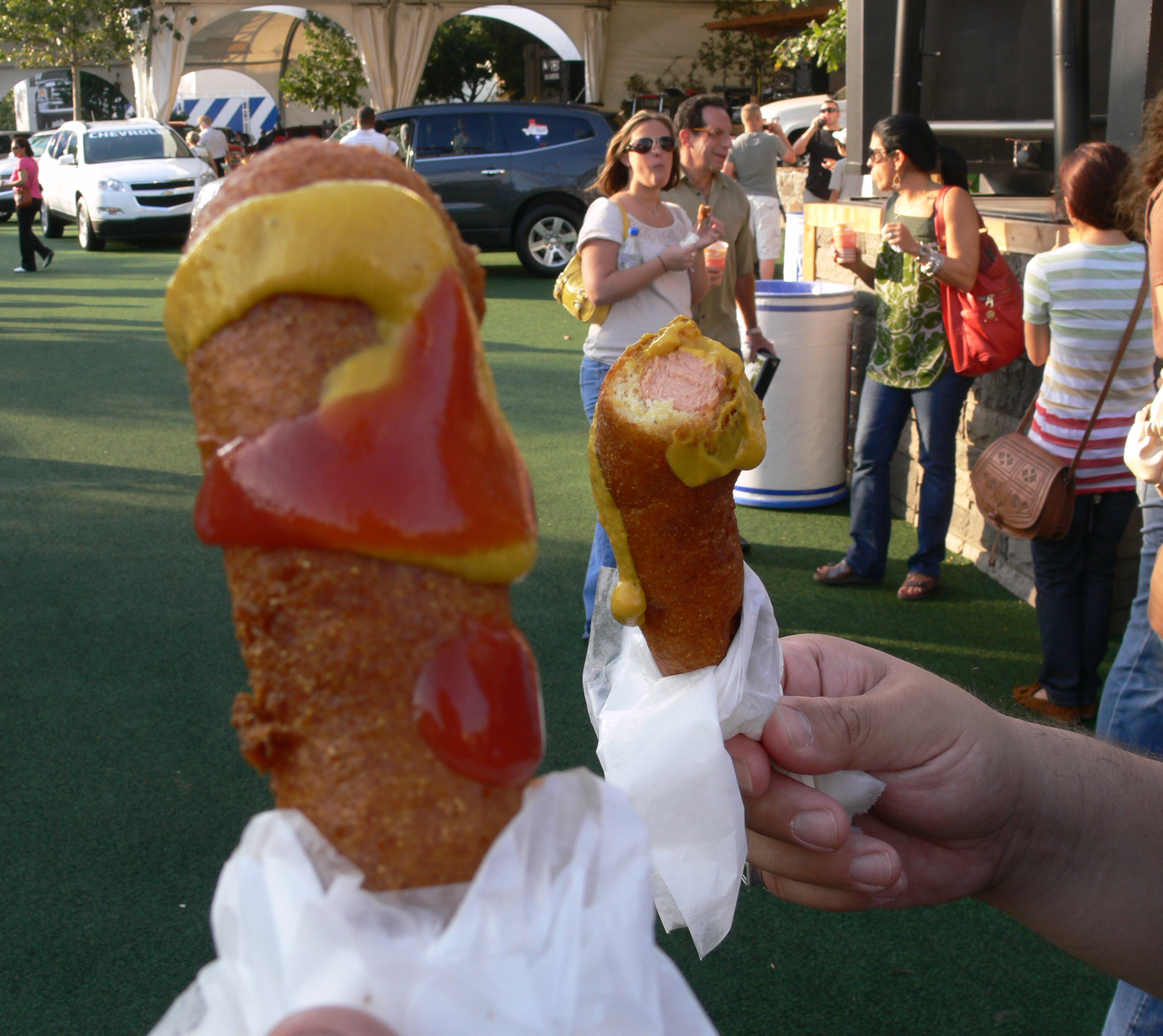
"Corny dogs" being eaten at the State Fair of Texas

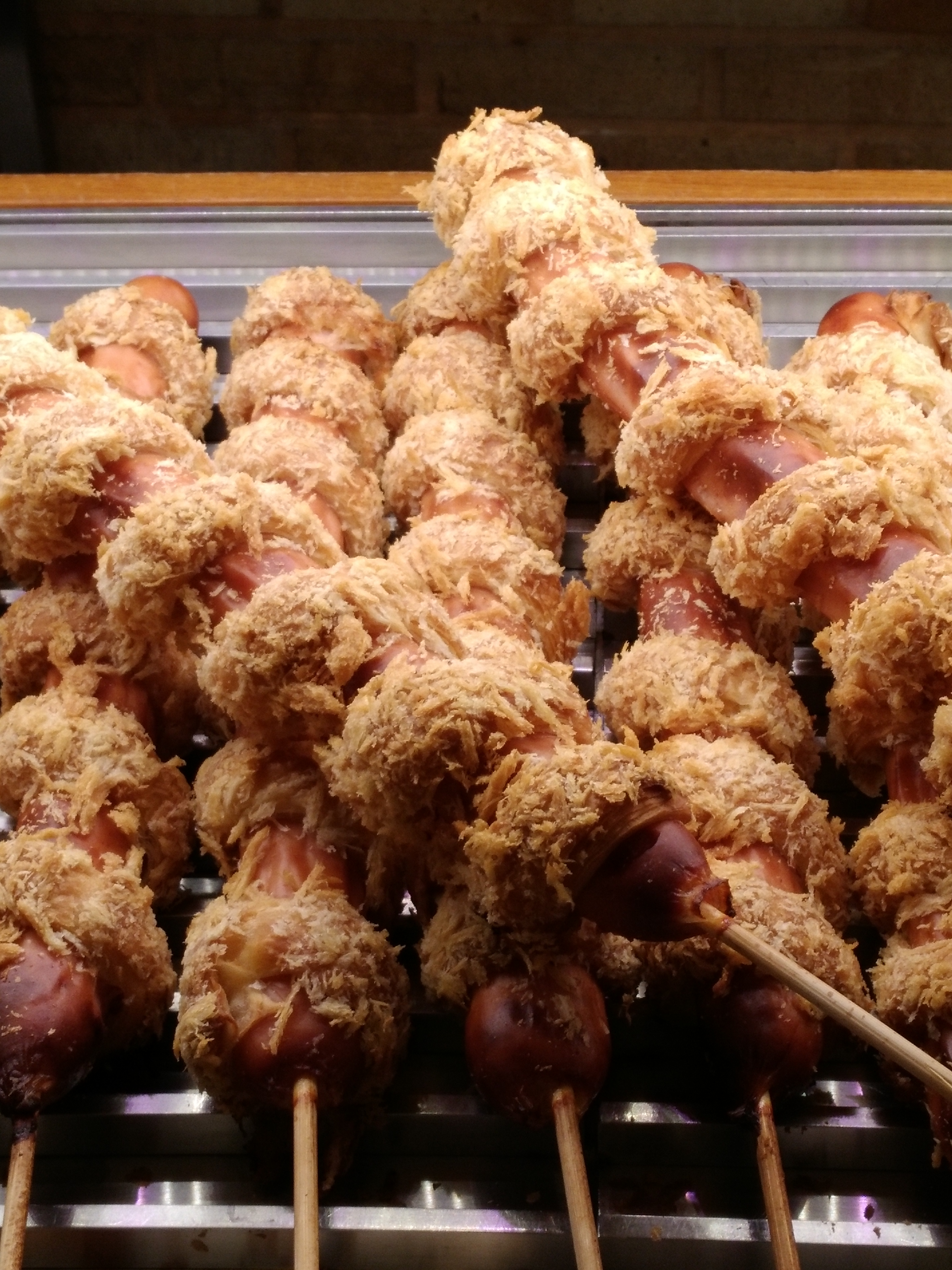
Tornado corn dogs sold in Korea

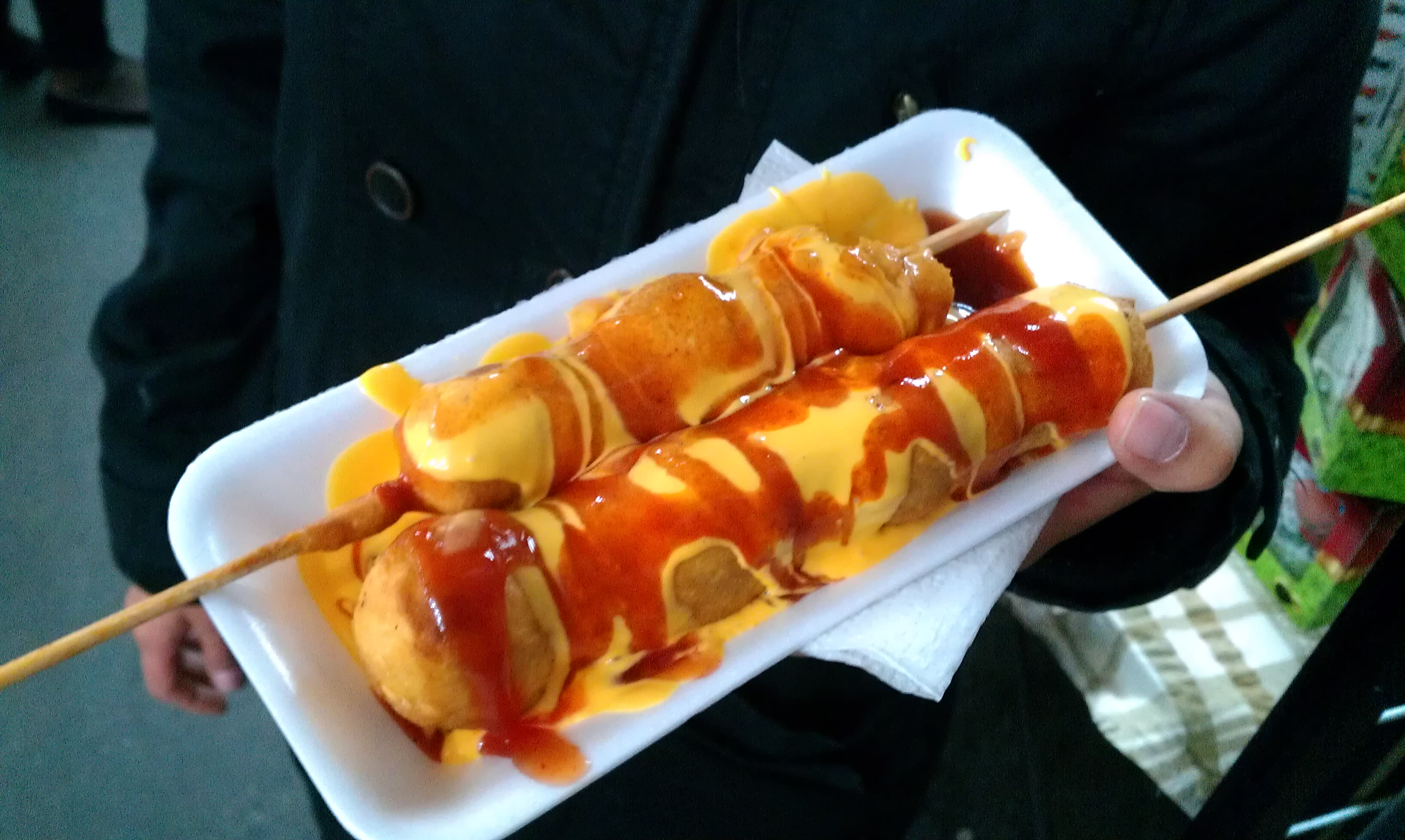
Corn dogs from a Christmas tianguis in the streets of Colonia Industrial, Mexico City

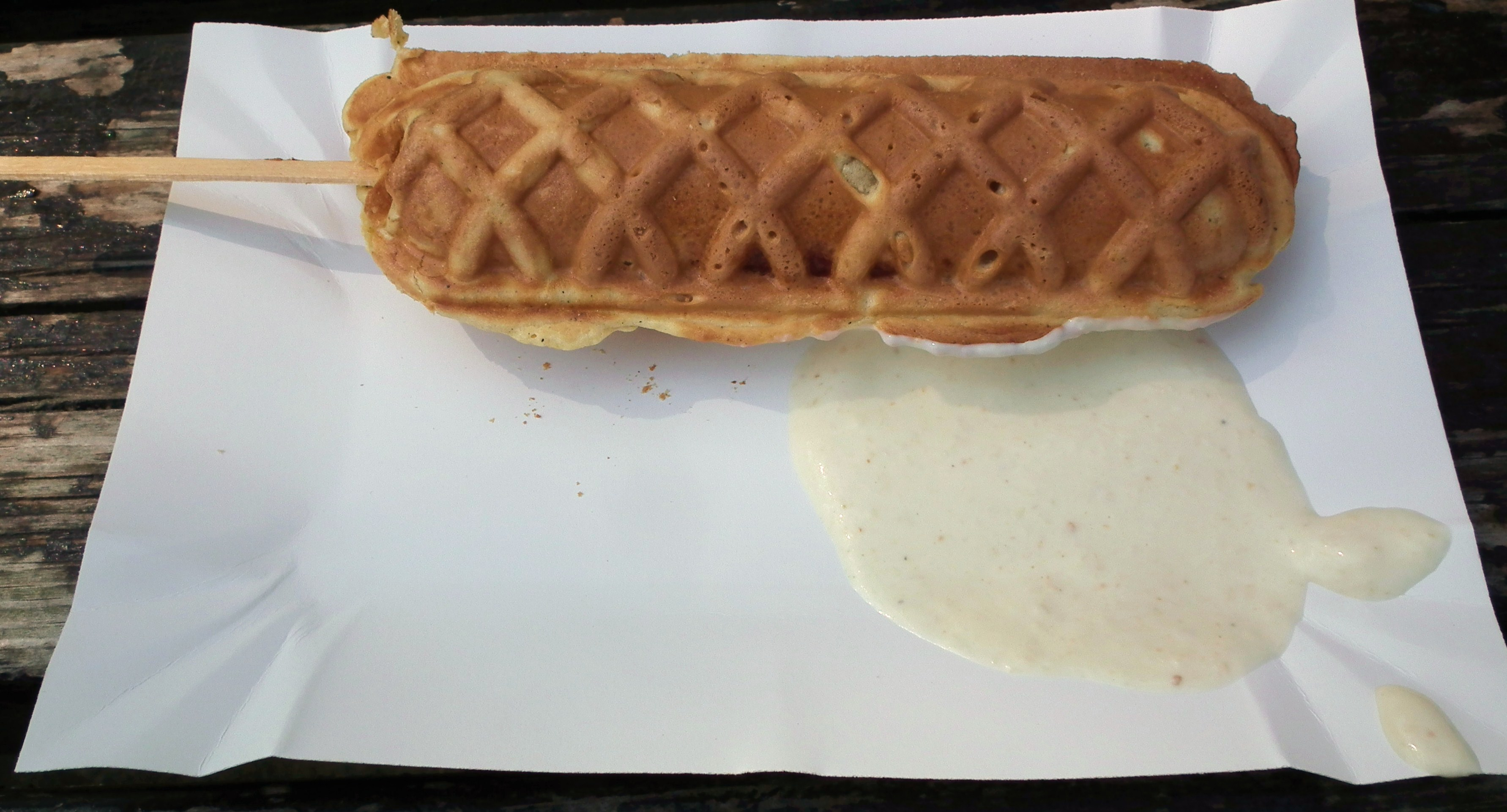
A corn dog served with horseradish sauce in Poznań

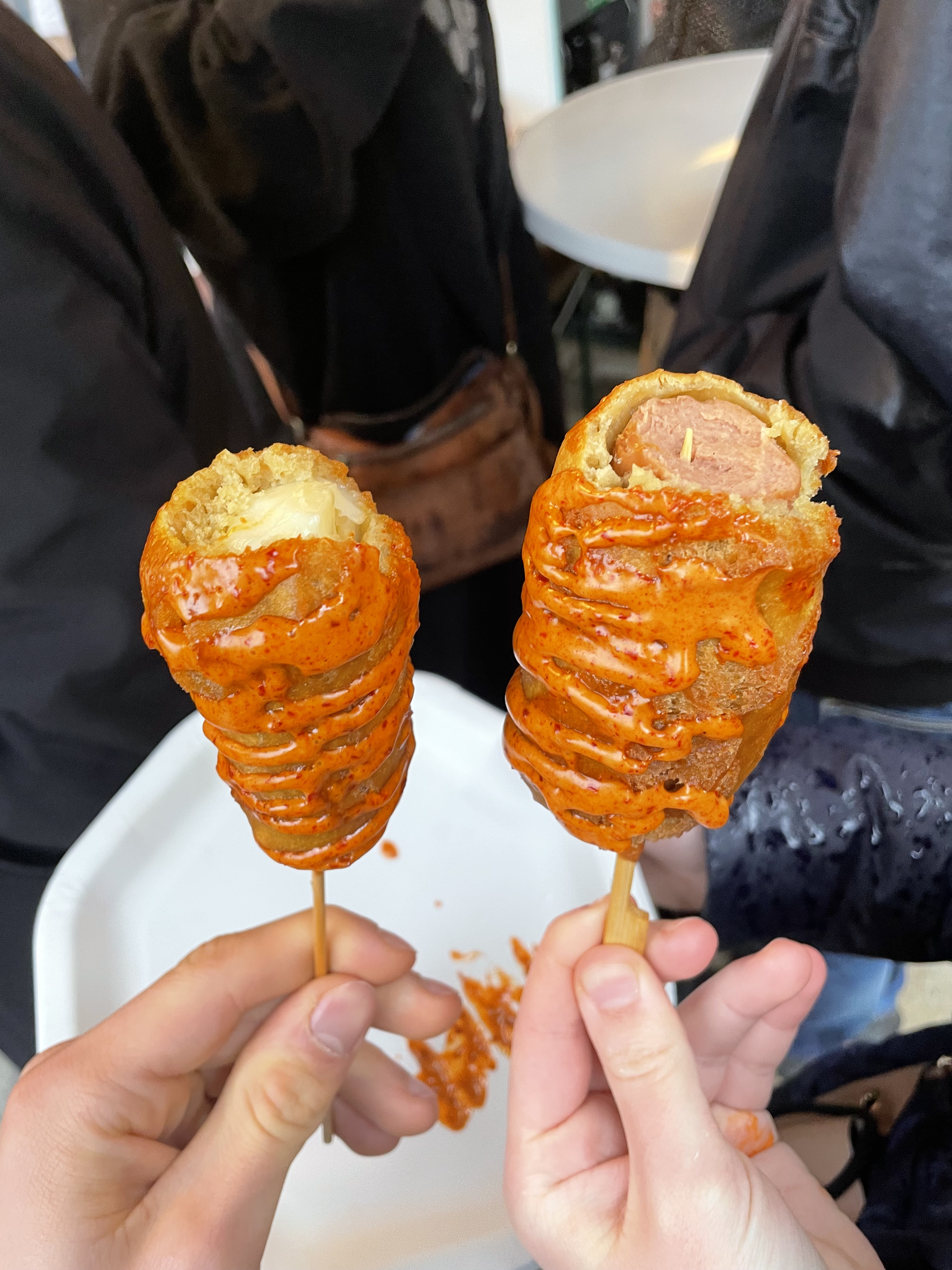
Corn dogs with vegan cheese (left) and vegan sausage (right) at a German Christmas Market in Leipzig

== See also ==
- Bagel dog
- Battered sausage
- Hot dog variations
- Hushpuppy
- Pepperoni roll
- Pigs in a blanket
- Pronto Pup
- Sausage roll
- Saveloy
- Toad in the hole
