= Charles Isaac and Lizzie Hunter Moore Anderson House =

Historic house in Missouri, United States

- U.S. National Register of Historic Places
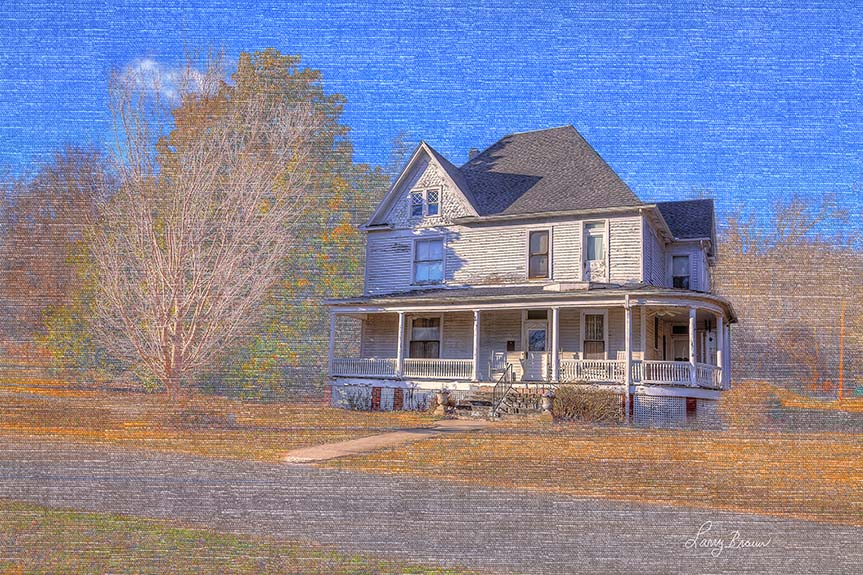
- Charles Isaac and Lizzie Hunter Moore Anderson House, January 2017

- Location within Missouri Location within the United States
- Location: 203 Washington St., Commerce, Missouri
- Coordinates: 37°9′54″N 89°27′15″W
- Area: 1.5 acres (0.61 ha)
- Architectural style: Queen Anne
- NRHP reference No.: 06000473
- Added to NRHP: June 7, 2006

Charles Isaac and Lizzie Hunter Moore Anderson House is a historic home located at Commerce, Scott County, Missouri. It was built in 1902, and is a 2 1/2-story, Free Classic Queen Anne style frame dwelling measuring 61 feet by 41 feet. It has a hipped roof with prominent front gable and dormers. It features a wrap-around porch with nine Doric order columns. Also on the property are the contributing garage (1905) and tool shed.

It was added to the National Register of Historic Places in 2006.
