= C. F. Cline =

American politician

Member of the U.S. House of Representatives from Missouri's 159th district

Missouri House of Representatives
- In office 1973–1977

Personal details
- Born: 1939 Sikeston, Missouri
- Died: 2009 (aged 69–70) Port Charlotte, Florida
- Resting place: Sarasota National Cemetery
- Party: Democratic
- Spouse: Kay Ireland
- Children: 2 daughters
- Occupation: realtor, investor

Charles Floyd Cline (July 8, 1939 – February 21, 2009) was a Democratic politician who served 4 years in the Missouri House of Representatives. He was born in Sikeston, Missouri, and was educated in the Sikeston public school system, San Francisco State College, and Southeast Missouri State University. On January 23, 1971, he married Kay Ireland. Cline served in the U.S. Air Force between 1957 and 1967.
