= Michael Parkes =

American painter

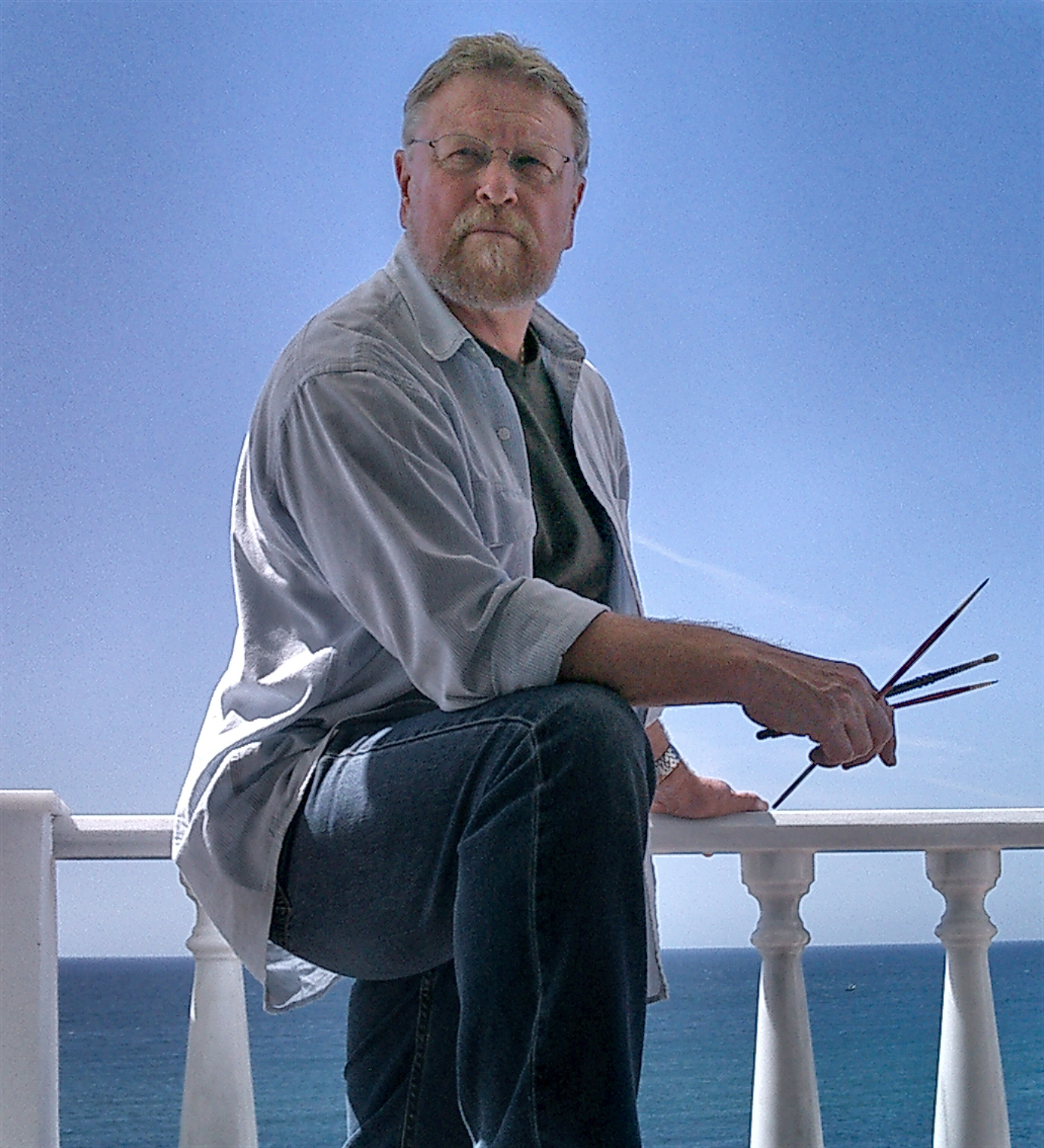
- Michael Parkes in 2012
- Born: October 12, 1944 (age 81); Sikeston, Missouri, U.S.
- Known for: Painter, Sculptor and Stone Lithographer
- Spouse: Maria Sedoff
- Website: https://michaelparkesofficial.com/

Michael Parkes (born October 12, 1944 in Sikeston, Missouri) is an American-born artist living in Spain who is best known for work in the areas of fantasy art and magic realism. He specializes in painting, stone lithography and sculpture. He also creates limited-edition Giclée images.

== Biography ==
Parkes studied graphic art and painting at the University of Kansas. As a student, Parkes was fascinated by various graphic processes, and he later became proficient in the difficult medium of the colour stone lithograph. Many of his recent works have been produced as Aurographics, limited edition giclée prints.

His unique style evolved in isolation, after a period in which he gave up the practice of art altogether and went to India in search of philosophical illumination, a location that he and his wife continue to visit annually.

Early on, he painted in the generally abstract expressionist style common among his teachers. However, he later began to draw and paint in a meticulous style of detailed representation. This style is realistic in principle, but often uses magical subject matter, with imagery drawn from a range of traditions including the cabalistic and the tantric. Strange beasts encounter mysterious winged women, good and evil fight out their eternal conflict.

Gargoyles, 1985 Parkes poster

Several of Parkes' works have been used as cover illustrations, including:

- OMNI (Dec 1980, June 1980, Nov 1981)
- The Best of Omni Science Fiction, No. 6 (1983)
- Omni Best Science Fiction One (1992)
- Omni Best Science Fiction Three (1993)
- Full Spectrum 5 (1995, 1996)
- ParaSpheres: Extending Beyond the Spheres of Literary and Genre Fiction: Fabulist and New Wave Fabulist Stories (2006).
- Karma in Christianity - Charles Pradeep (2011)

A Parkes sculpture, Angel Affair (2004), was the Sep/Oct 2004 cover illustration for the Dutch-language Fine Arts Magazine, which also contained a feature article on one of Parkes' exhibitions in the Netherlands.

Lisa Starry of Scorpius Dance Theater, Phoenix Arizona in 2007 choreographed a contemporary dance presentation based on the works of Parkes. Also in 2007, Parkes was invited to exhibit a painting of his own vision of Venus at an international exhibition of 35 magic realism artists in Denmark.

In 2009, one of Parkes' paintings, The Three Graces, is repeatedly mentioned in Dan Brown's novel The Lost Symbol. Parkes was interviewed for his interpretation of the symbolic use of his art in Brown's book by Daniel Burstein. Milliner Justin Smith has said his design for the horned headpiece worn by actress Angelina Jolie in the 2014 film Maleficent was inspired in part by Michael Parkes lithographs.

== Philosophy ==
Parkes, who has described consciousness as a laboratory to explore the physicality of evolution, finds value in meditation and admires the 19th-century Indian philosopher, Sri Aurobindo.

== Awards ==
- Association of Science Fiction & Fantasy Artists (ASFA) - Chesley Awards
  - 1994 Best Cover Illustration: Paperback Book - Omni Best Science Fiction Three (nominee)
  - 2003 Best Product Illustration - "The Court Painter" (nominee)
