= Marjorie Montgomery =

American actress

- Born: May 27, 1912; Sikeston, Missouri, U.S.
- Died: October 10, 1991 (aged 79); Longwood, Florida, U.S.
- Occupations: Dancer; actress; fashion designer
- Known for: Vaudeville, motion pictures
- Spouse: Lucian Eugene Kipness (m. 1942; died 1990)

Marjorie Montgomery (May 27, 1912 – October 10, 1991) was an American child dancer and actress. She appeared in vaudeville and later in motion pictures, before becoming a noted fashion designer.

== Early life and film career ==
Montgomery was born in Sikeston, Missouri, on May 27, 1912 to Grover Cleveland Montgomery (1885–1934) and Mary Emily McCord (1885–1962). As a young girl she was in a group of traveling vaudeville players of the Junior Times Club in Los Angeles, California. Accompanied by truckloads of ice cream, Montgomery and the others entertained children at hospitals. In May 1924 she performed as an "eccentric" dancer at the Orthopedic and Children's Hospital in Los Angeles. In 1925 Montgomery entered the Mary Pickford silhouette contest which selected a lookalike of America's sweetheart. Other aspiring young actresses like Virginia Davis, Cecilia Parker, and Mary Kestner, also submitted photos.

As a seventeen-year-old Hollywood High School student, Montgomery acted the part of a maid in the stage play Bad Babies. An attorney for the California State Department of Industrial Relations ruled that the theme of the production was too risque for a minor actress to appear in. Montgomery was required to wait until her eighteenth birthday in 1930 to participate. She became upset over the ruling. Her mother, Mary Cleveland, hired a private tutor so that Montgomery would comply with the Los Angeles compulsory school laws. An understudy, Dorothy Gould, took over the role. Montgomery's career as a film actress was quite brief. She had an uncredited role as a student in Freshman Year (1938).

== Career as a fashion designer ==
Montgomery started out designing and manufacturing attractive cotton dresses in the mid-1920s. She worked as a costume designer for the Republic Pictures film Outside of Paradise (1938).

By 1940 she was noted for her designs in cotton and for having promoted bare-midriff beachwear and bathing costumes for several seasons. In 1953 Montgomery stated that she had 28 years of experience to her name. In 1965 she was described as one of the "great" and "traditional" Californian designers.

== Personal life and death ==
Montgomery married French-born Lucian Eugene Kipness (1911–1990) in Clark County, Washington in May 1942. He died in Casselberry, Florida in August 1990 at the age of 78. Montgomery died in Longwood, Florida in October 1991 at the age of 79.

== Additional sources ==
- Coshocton Tribune (Coshocton, Ohio), Fashion Begins At Home, Monday Evening, November 3, 1947, Page 5.
- Fresno Bee Republican, Western Designers Offer Varied Spring Modes, November 16, 1962, Page 22.
- Long Beach Independent, California Designers In Unprecedented Show, September 28, 1955, Page 13.
- Los Angeles Times, Fashions, August 24, 1958, Page D12.
