= Dave Barham =

American businessman

- Born: June 13, 1913; Bell City, Missouri, U.S.
- Died: March 25, 1991 (aged 77)
- Occupation: Business entrepreneur

Dave Barham (June 13, 1913 – March 25, 1991) was an American business entrepreneur who founded the fast-food chain, Hot Dog on a Stick. Barham is also credited with being the originator of the stick in the corn dog.

== Early years ==
Born in Bell City, Missouri, Barham lived his youth on a farm. He traveled frequently to nearby mid-western cities such as St. Louis and Chicago. In these two large cities, he was exposed to big city atmosphere. Barham's favorite snacks were the corn dogs. He figured out that, while other foods such as hamburgers and ice creams had chain restaurants, corn dogs did not.

== Hot Dog on a Stick ==
He set on an enterprise to create a hot dog restaurant. Soon after, the first Hot Dog on a Stick was opened in 1946 by Muscle Beach in Santa Monica, California.

The first restaurant ever in a mall was a Hot Dog on a Stick franchise in Murray, Utah. Barham was able to convince the mall owner in 1972 to rent him the space for the restaurant.

The restaurant flourished and had franchises across the United States. By the 1980s, Barham was a common guest speakers at businessmen meetings.

The restaurant chain he created is now arguably more famous for their lemonades. Employees wear bright red and yellow uniforms, and can sometimes be spotted mashing lemons by hand to make the restaurant's lemonade.

Barham died in 1991 from cancer and left the Hot Dog on a Stick franchise to his employees, making it the nation's only 100 percent employee owned and operated fast food restaurant chain.

== See also ==
- Hot Dog on a Stick
