= Marshall Hotel =

- U.S. National Register of Historic Places
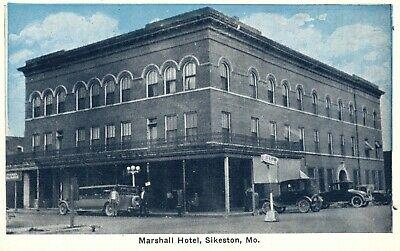

- Location within Missouri Location within the United States
- Location: 103 E. Malone Ave., Sikeston, Missouri
- Coordinates: 36°52′33″N 89°35′19″W
- Area: less than one acre
- Built: 1910
- NRHP reference No.: 84002715
- Added to NRHP: March 22, 1984

Marshall Hotel, also known as the Dunn Hotel, is a historic American hotel building located at Sikeston, Scott County, Missouri. It was built in 1910, and is a three-story, red brick commercial building with a shed roof. It measures 70 feet by 120 feet and features a cast iron storefront and segmental arched windows.

It was added to the National Register of Historic Places in 1984.

This site has since been demolished (2025)
