= Hot Dog on a Stick =

Fast food franchise

HDOS Enterprises
- Trade name: Hot Dog on a Stick
- Type: Subsidiary
- Industry: Restaurants
- Genre: Fast food
- Founded: June 1946; 80 years ago Santa Monica, California, U.S.
- Founder: Dave Barham
- Headquarters: Carlsbad, California, U.S
- Number of locations: 37 (2026)
- Products: Hot dogs
- Revenue: ▲US$45 million (2021)
- Parent: Amazing Brands, LLC
- Website: hotdogonastick.com

Hot Dog on a Stick is a fast food company that was founded by Dave Barham in Santa Monica, California, in 1946, and later branched out into malls and shopping centers. From 2014 to 2021, the company was owned by Global Franchise Group based in Atlanta, GA. Under GFG, the brand opened new locations across the country and moved into the franchising space. On June 28, 2021, Global Franchise Group announced that it would be acquired by FAT Brands, owners of Fatburger and Johnny Rockets. The acquisition was completed on July 22.

== History ==
The first Hot Dog on a Stick store opened at the original Muscle Beach location next to the Santa Monica Pier in Santa Monica, California, in 1946, serving lemonade and corn dogs on sticks to people on the beach. The second location opened in the late 50s at Pacific Ocean Park (also sometimes stylized as "P.O.P." and not to be confused with the current Pacific Park Pier in Santa Monica today) in Santa Monica, California. In 1962, a third location was opened on the Redondo Beach Pier, which remained the only independently owned location under the name "Craig's Hot Dog on a Stick" until its permanent closure in September 2024. Hot Dog on a Stick later expanded and became a large food chain. Hot Dog on a Stick currently has just 35 United States locations, which are primarily located in popular regional shopping malls. There are also internationally franchised locations, in South Korea and Shanghai, China.

On January 26, 2026, parent company FAT Brands filed for Chapter 11 bankruptcy protection in an effort to shed billions of dollars in debt. The company listed assets and liabilities between $1 billion and $10 billion. On April 30, 2026, FAT Brands announced the sale of Hot Dog on a Stick to Amazing Brands, LLC for $8 million.
