= Pronto Pup =

American corn-dog brand

Pronto Pup is a brand of deep‑fried cornmeal‑battered hot dogs on a stick, similar to the corn dog, used by restaurants and street‑vendors across the United States. Named for the speed of the cooking process, the Pronto Pup was invented in Rockaway Beach, Oregon, and is marketed as “the original corn dog”.

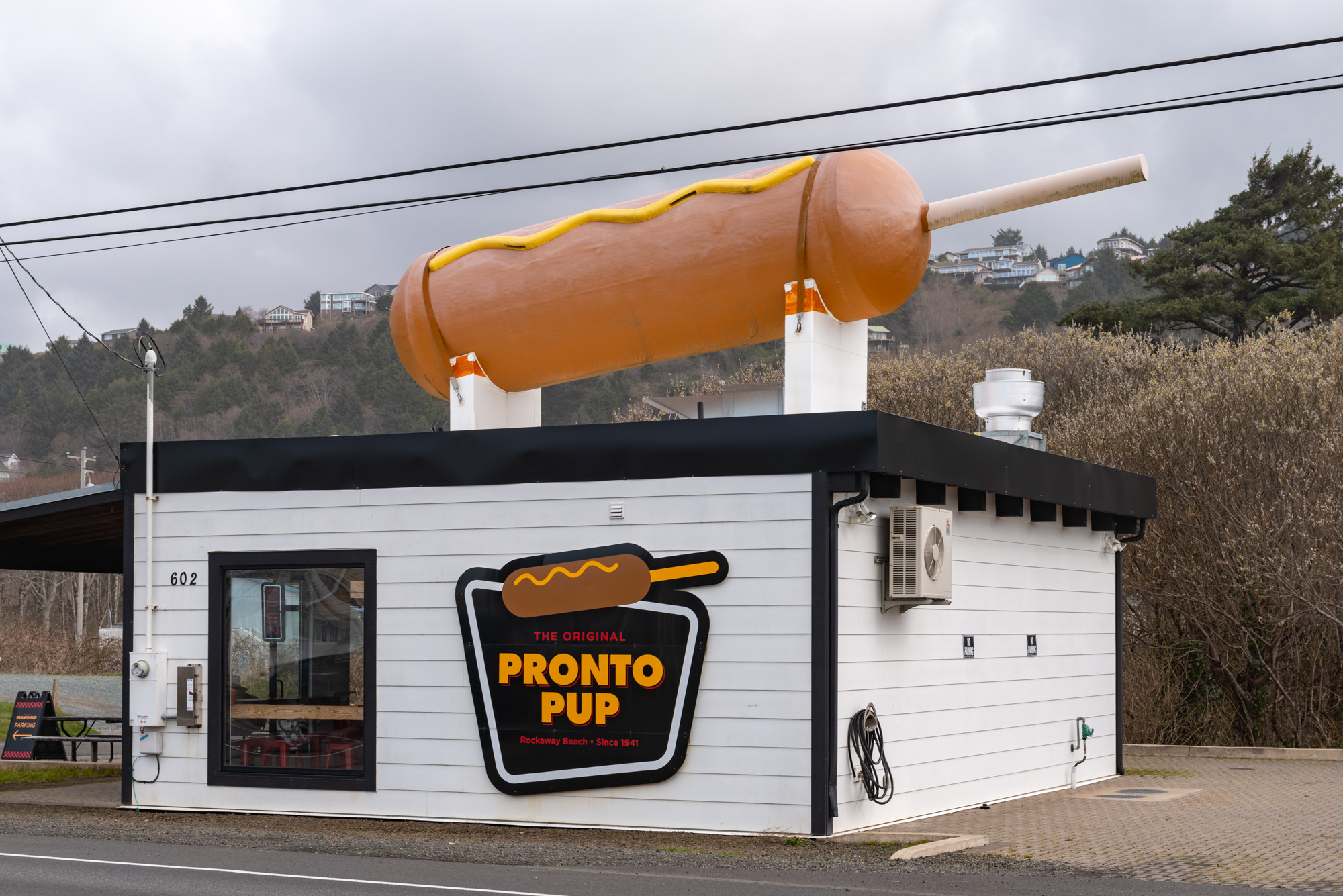
The Original Pronto Pup location in Rockaway Beach, Oregon

Pronto Pup batter is described as less sweet than standard cornbread batters.

Today the Pronto Pup brand refers both to the original batter mix manufactured by The Pronto Pup Company of Portland, Oregon, and to the network of independent stands and franchises that use this mix and brand name.

== Inventing the Pronto Pup ==
The Pronto Pup originated in 1939, when George and Vera Boyington operated a hot‑dog stand in Rockaway Beach, Oregon. During a rainy holiday weekend, the couple encountered spoiled hot‑dog buns, prompting George to experiment with batter‑coating hot dogs on sticks for quicker cooking. In 1941 they opened a stand in Portland and sold thousands of units at the Pacific International Livestock Exposition.

== Expansion and franchise ==
In 1942 the Boyingtons trademarked “Pronto Pup” and began selling franchises of the treat, using a proprietary batter mix that franchisees were required to purchase. After World War II the brand expanded across the United States, especially at fairs and carnivals. At the Minnesota State Fair, after a 1947 debut, a long‑running Pronto Pup concession has grown into a large operation that processes tens of thousands of units per fair season.

== Franchise locations ==
One of the earliest franchisees was the Karnis family of Minnesota, whose Pronto Pup stand at the Minnesota State Fair remains a major vendor. The Original Pronto Pup location in Rockaway Beach, Oregon opened in 2016 to commemorate the original invention and features a large fiberglass corn dog on its roof.
