= Josef Spudich =

American football player and teacher (1908–2001)

Josef I. Spudich (November 9, 1908 – March 10, 2001), also known as Joe Spudic, was a United States professional American football player and teacher.

He was born one of nine children of parents who came to the United States in 1903 from Croatia.

In order to help with family expenses, Spudich worked nights and summers in a coal mine while attending high school in Benld, Illinois, and was graduated in 1929. He was a graduate of McKendree College, Lebanon, Illinois, in 1933, where he was named to the United Press International All-Star Football Team in 1932, and was All State fullback in 1931 and 1932. He played professional football for the St. Louis Gunners, the Tulsa Oilers, and the Chicago Cardinals.

Spudich earned his master's degree from the University of Missouri and did post-graduate work at Oxford in England and at Columbia University.

He taught and coached in Sikeston, Missouri, Cairo and El Dorado Springs; then starting in 1942, at Freeport High School, Freeport, Illinois, where he was head football coach from 1951–1954. After retiring at Freeport High School in 1964, he taught English and was chairman of the Humanities Division at Highland College, also in Freeport, Illinois.
