= Sikeston station =

- Sikeston St. Louis, Iron Mountain and Southern Railway Depot
- U.S. National Register of Historic Places
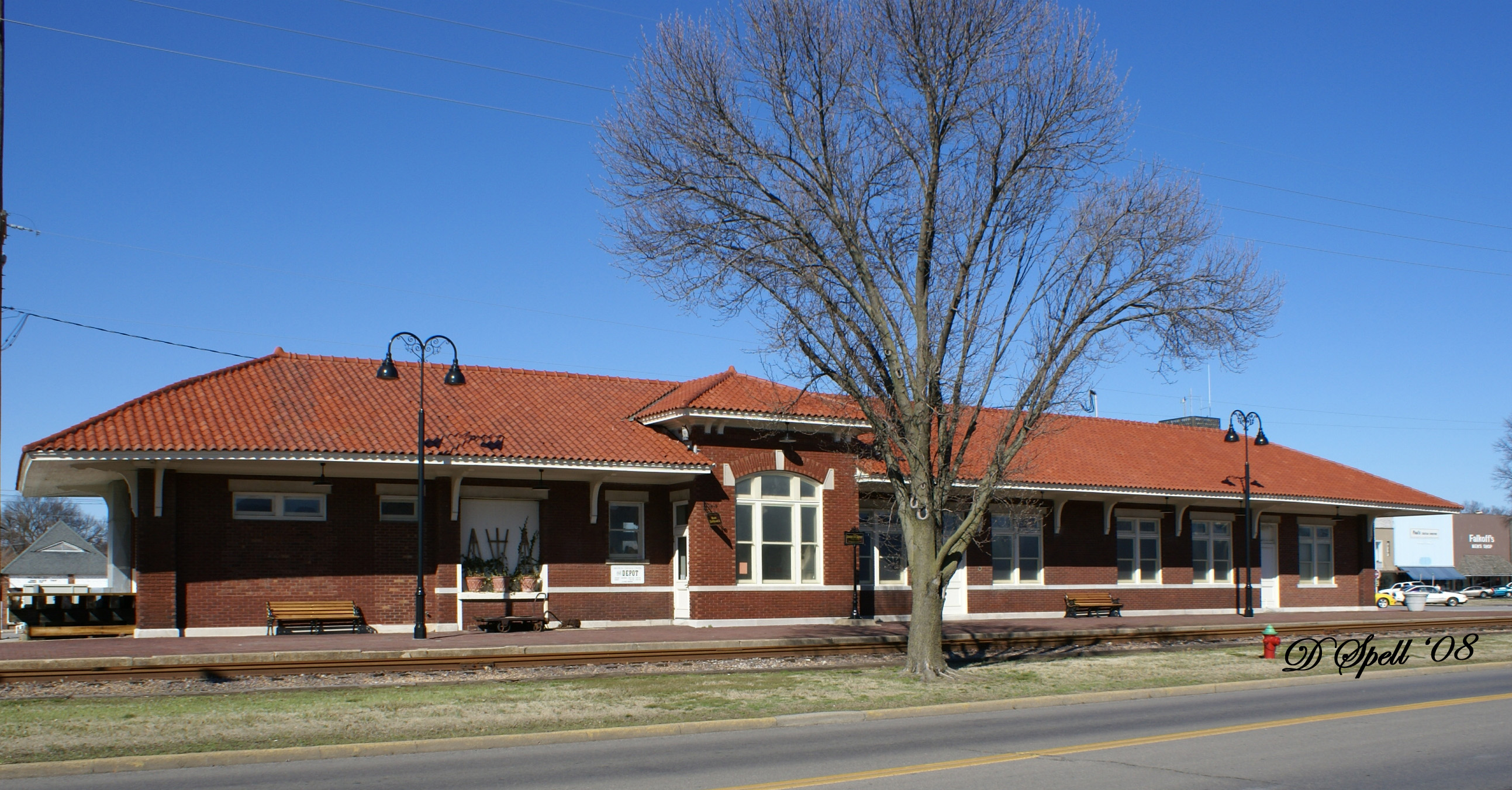
- The Sikeston Depot, February 2008

- Location within Missouri Location within the United States
- Location: Front St., bet. Scott and New Madrid Sts., Sikeston, Missouri
- Coordinates: 36°52′35″N 89°35′23″W
- Area: less than one acre
- Built: 1916-1917
- Architect: Tucker, E.M.; Duncan, J.C.
- Architectural style: standardized railroad depot
- NRHP reference No.: 00001549
- Added to NRHP: December 28, 2000

Sikeston St. Louis, Iron Mountain and Southern Railway Depot, also known as the Sikeston Missouri Pacific Railroad Depot, is a historic train station building located at Sikeston, Scott County, Missouri, United States. It was built in 1916-1917 by the St. Louis, Iron Mountain and Southern Railway, and is a one-story, rectangular brick building measuring 24 feet by 100 feet. It has a hipped, red ceramic tile roof with wide eaves supported by curvilinear brackets. It houses a local history museum.

It was added to the National Register of Historic Places in 2000.
