= Sikeston, Missouri =

- City
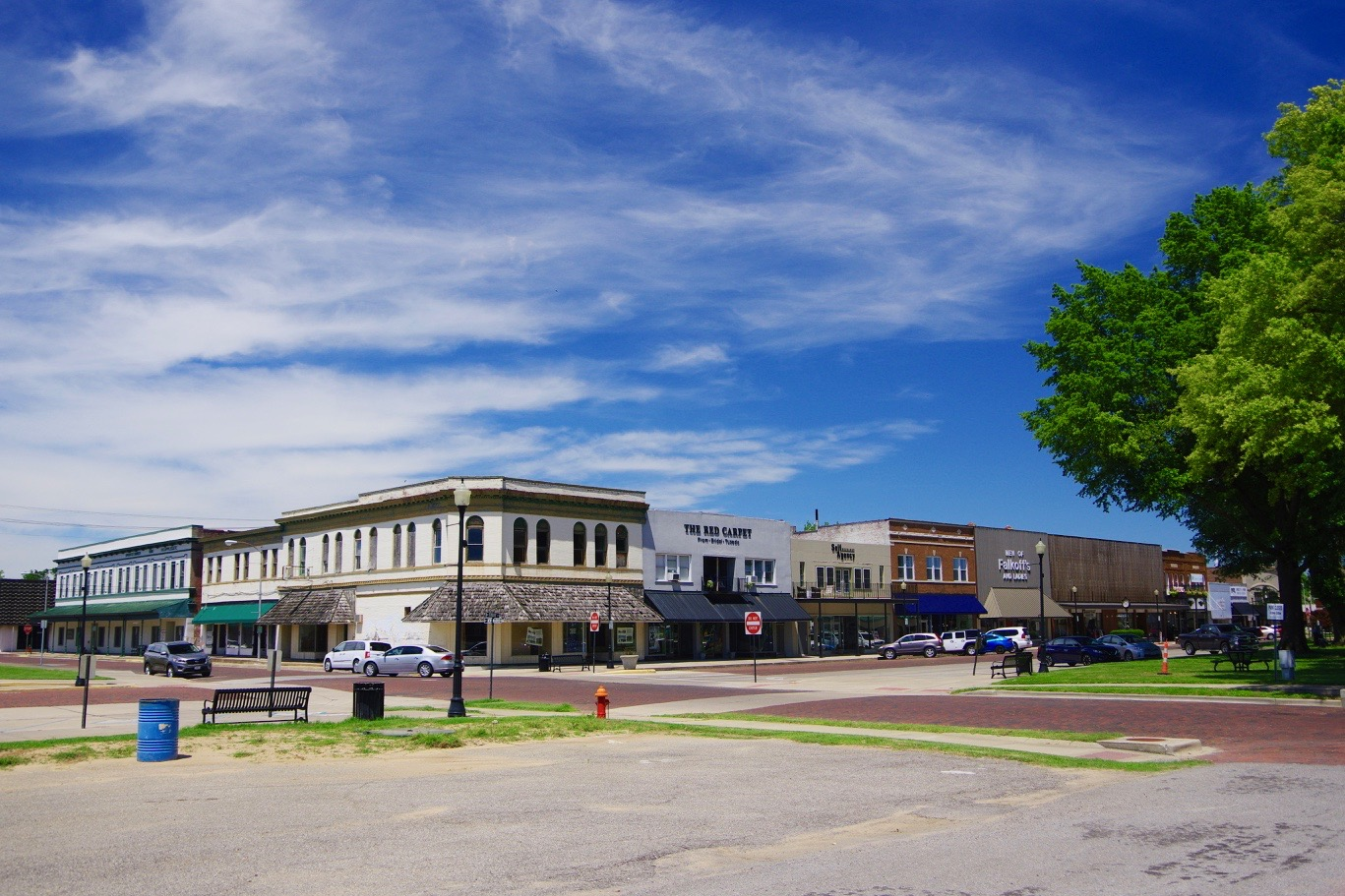
- Downtown Sikeston

- Location of Sikeston, Missouri
- Coordinates: 36°52′59″N 89°35′16″W
- Country: United States
- State: Missouri
- Counties: Scott, New Madrid

Government
  - Type: Mayor-Council
  - Mayor: Greg Turnbow

Area
  - Total: 17.30 sq mi (44.80 km^{2})
  - Land: 17.14 sq mi (44.39 km^{2})
  - Water: 0.16 sq mi (0.41 km^{2})
- Elevation: 331 ft (101 m)

Population (2020)
  - Total: 16,291
  - Density: 950.6/sq mi (367.01/km^{2})
- Time zone: UTC-6 (Central (CST))
  - Summer (DST): UTC-5 (CDT)
- ZIP code: 63801
- Area code: 573
- FIPS code: 29-67790
- GNIS feature ID: 2395885
- Website: http://www.sikeston.org/

Sikeston (/ˈsaɪkstən/ SYKE-stən) is a city located both in southern Scott County and northern New Madrid County, in the state of Missouri, United States. It is situated just north of the "Missouri Bootheel", although many locals consider Sikeston a part of it. By way of Interstate 55, Interstate 57, and U.S. Route 60, Sikeston is close to the halfway point between St. Louis and Memphis, Tennessee and is four hours from Nashville.

The city is named after John Sikes, who founded it in 1860. It is the principal city of the Sikeston Micropolitan Statistical Area, which consists of all of Scott County, and has a total population of 41,143.

As of the 2020 census, the city population was 16,291, making it the fourth-most populous city in Missouri's 8th Congressional district behind Cape Girardeau, Rolla, and Farmington, and just ahead of Poplar Bluff which has had a similar population as Sikeston over the last few decades. Before the 2010 census, it had been the second-most populous city in the congressional district.

== History ==
The first explorers and settlers came to a region of cypress swamps and forested prairies. At the beginning of the 20th century, the Little River Drainage District was formed to reclaim the land. This was the world's largest drainage project, moving more earth than completed during the construction of the Panama Canal.

In 1541, Spanish explorer Hernando de Soto may have stood upon the Sikeston Ridge, although some historical references dispute this, believing that he traveled further south than Sikeston. The area was claimed by the French as part of La Louisiane, and they ceded it in 1763 to the Spanish after being defeated by Britain in the Seven Years' War. In 1789, by order of the King of Spain, an overland route was laid out to connect the cities of St. Louis and New Orleans. This frontier road was known as the El Camino Real or King's Highway.

In 1803 the United States acquired this area under the Louisiana Purchase. More Americans began to settle west of the river. From December 16, 1811, to February 4, 1812, the area was struck by the 1811–12 New Madrid earthquakes (a series of more than 2,000 events). They are believed by some to have been the greatest in North American history.

The Hunter Memorial Cemetery, located on the grounds of the local Presbyterian Church, was established around 1812 after the New Madrid earthquake by Joseph Hunter II who served under George Rogers Clark during the Revolutionary War and on the Territorial Council for President Madison. In 1814, the village of Winchester was laid out about one-half a mile south of the future site of Sikeston. It was the seat of justice for New Madrid County, but after the county seat was moved in 1822 to New Madrid, Winchester became defunct and abandoned. The Winchester jail was completed in 1817 and was used until December 1821, when Scott County was organized.

The land for the city of Sikeston was first owned by Frenchman Francis Paquette. In 1829, the city site was acquired by the Stallcup family. In 1859, city founder John Sikes, who had married into the Stallcup family, gained control of the land. In April 1860, he had the city platted in anticipation of the completion of the Cairo and Fulton Railroad, which would intersect with the King's Highway. In the city of New Madrid, the street was known as Big Prairie Road, and later as Sikeston Road after the city of Sikeston was established.

Today Kingshighway, also known as Business U.S. Highway 61, serves Sikeston as a primary north–south street. It is lined with businesses and older historic homes. Sikeston's downtown area includes Malone Park, the city's oldest park, and the historic First Methodist Church columns. These six pillars are all that remain of the 1879 church which was destroyed in 1968 by fire.

The first house in Sikeston is believed to have been located at 318 Baker Lane. The "Baker House" was probably built in 1855, about five years before the town was founded. One of the early inhabitants of this house was Lee Hunter, after whom one of the elementary schools is named. The house once had a large barn, located on the site where Lee Hunter school was later built. The Baker family moved into the house in 1888 and purchased it from the Hunter family in the early 1950s.

=== Civil War era ===
Although Sikeston was a small village during the Civil War, its position at the railroad and highway intersection gave it strategic significance. Around July 1861, Confederate forces of Brigadier General Gideon Johnson Pillow planned to link up with units commanded by Sterling Price and Benjamin McCulloch for an advance on St. Louis, using the Sikeston-area road of Kingshighway. In preparation for this advance, Confederate General Jeff Thompson gathered Missouri state troops and irregulars near Sikeston; he robbed a bank in nearby Charleston to pay men and buy arms and supplies. Legend has it that he hid part of his money in Sikeston under one of the oak trees at the corner of New Madrid Street and Kingshighway.

In the fall of 1861, General Pillow pushed a column of troops from New Madrid towards Sikeston and Cape Girardeau. On October 4, Confederate General Jeff Thompson reached Sikeston, planning to strike Cape Girardeau; however, his manpower was limited, and he decided to retreat into the swamps off to the west. On November 3, from Cairo, Illinois, US Brigadier General Ulysses S. Grant wrote a letter to Colonel Richard J. Oglesby, commander of the Union Headquarters District Southeast Missouri at Bird's Point, ordering his troops to "strike for Sikeston" from the Mississippi River town of Commerce. Brigadier General Benjamin Prentiss and Colonel W. H. L. Wallace also converged in the Sikeston area in preparation of Grant's attack at the Battle of Belmont.

In 1862, Sikeston was used as a transportation connection as Union Brigadier General Pope sent his artillery across the river to Commerce, Missouri, to be sent by rail to Sikeston for cart transportation to New Madrid, in preparation for the Battle of Island Number Ten. On February 28, 1862, Pope left Commerce with his army of 12,000, arriving in Sikeston on March 2. US Colonel William Pitt Kellogg, future governor of Louisiana, commanding the 7th Illinois cavalry, was the first to encounter the rebel sabotage of recently burned bridges and other obstructions. The federals were attacked just south of Sikeston by a small group of rebels led by General Thompson (he was called the Swamp Fox, a nickname after the Revolutionary War Brigadier General Francis Marion). Thompson commanded a detachment of 85 horsemen and four to six experimental cannons that had been manufactured in Memphis. Seeing that Colonel James Morgan's Illinois troops were reinforced by Brigadier General Schuyler Hamilton's 2nd Division, Thompson fled.

Entering the area from Bird's Point, Brigadier General Eleazor Arthur Paine, commander of the 4th Division of Army of the Mississippi, repaired the railroad and telegraph lines and used troops from Illinois to form a garrison for Sikeston, Bertrand, and Charleston. War records indicate that on March 31, 1862, there were six Union officers and 143 Union soldiers present in Sikeston. On September 22, 1864, during Price's Raid, a Confederate force of 1,500 men near Sikeston, under the command of Colonel William Lafayette Jeffers, attacked Captain Lewis Sells' company of Union soldiers who were moving from Cape Girardeau to reinforce two companies of soldiers in Bloomfield.

=== Post Civil War era ===
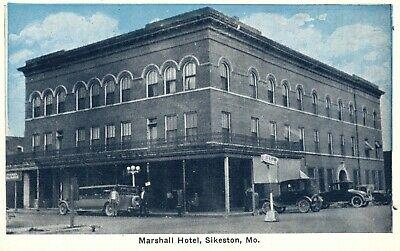
Old postcard of the Marshall Hotel.

One of the first rail lines west of the Mississippi River ran to Sikeston, and it was the terminus of the Cairo and Fulton Railroad until 1872. By 1900, Sikeston had a population of 1,100, and two drainage ditches had been completed. By this time, the city had two banks, two newspapers, and three hotels. One of the hotels built between 1895 and 1898 was a three-story brick hotel later known as the Marshall Hotel or Marshall-Dunn Hotel. It is listed on the National Register of Historic Places. Prominent individuals who stayed at this hotel included Harry S. Truman, Alben W. Barkley, and Tom Pendergast.

=== World Wars era ===
During World War I, an infantry company was organized in Sikeston on August 25, 1917, until the spring of 1919. Company K became part of the 140th Infantry, 70th Brigade, U.S. 35th Infantry Division and fought in the Meuse-Argonne Offensive. It also served as part of the occupation force of Europe. In 1920, American Legion Post 114 was chartered for the community of Sikeston and named after Henry Meldrun, a Sikeston native who was killed in Europe during World War I. Between the two world wars, Company K was reorganized. The company helped secure rail centers during the railroad workers' strike of 1922, helped out with the aftermath of the Poplar Bluff tornado of May 1927, and worked on the Mississippi River levees during the floods of 1927 and 1937. In 1941, Company K was sent to Camp Joseph T. Robinson, near Little Rock, where they drilled for eight months.

The Sikeston Memorial Municipal Airport was built in the 1930s, opening in July 1934. From 1940 until 1944, it was known as Harvey Parks Airport. Long barrack-style buildings were constructed to hold the Missouri Institute of Aeronautics, established after General Hap Arnold asked flight training operations to triple their enrollments. The first U.S. Army Air Corps inspection officials arrived in July 1940 with the first flight cadet arriving that September. In June 1940, a home at West Gladys and New Madrid streets was transformed into a district infirmary in coordination with the building of the new air barracks. World War II flying aces Robert S. Johnson and Harold E. Comstock trained at this location. The original gated entrance to Harvey Parks Airport now serves as the entrance to the city's Veterans Park.

During World War II, local National Guard unit Company K was assigned to the Western Defense Command in California. Sikeston-area students helped raise money to have three B-25 bombers named the Spirit of Sikeston, The Sikeston Bulldog, and one other. These three planes were supposedly used in the Doolittle Raid, during which they went down and are at the bottom of the Pacific between Japan and China. The local International Shoe Company factory had a contract for a major shoe order for the US Army during the war.

==== Lynching of Cleo Wright ====
Sikeston was the site of the first lynching to occur in the United States since the onset of World War II. In the early hours of Sunday, January 25, 1942, a Black man named Cleo Wright was arrested on charges of allegedly assaulting a white woman. Upon resisting arrest, Wright was shot several times by a city night marshal. The local General Hospital refused to admit Wright for treatment of his injuries due to his race. Police initially brought the ailing Wright to his home to die, but later returned him to the city jail, where a white mob abducted Wright in the early afternoon and burned him alive in front of two Black church congregations. The lynching spurred the first ever federal investigation into a civil rights matter, though no indictments were made.

=== Post World War era ===
Following World War II, Miner was founded as the next city. The city was first known as Minner, in honor of one of the original residing landowners. However, the name was altered when the railroad inadvertently omitted an "n" from the switching station, renaming it Miner Switch. In 1951, the city became incorporated due to modern-day pioneer William Howard McGill.

In 2000, the remains of Mason Yarbrough, a Sikeston native and World War II marine, were found in the Pacific area on Makin Island and returned to his hometown for a military funeral. The George E. Day Parkway is named for Medal of Honor recipient Colonel George E. "Bud" Day, an F-100 Super Sabre pilot who is the only known American POW to escape into South Vietnam. He was later recaptured and sent to the Hanoi Hilton.

Sikeston is home to the Missouri National Guard unit Company C 1140th Engineer Battalion, which took part in Operation Iraqi Freedom from February 2004 until February 2005. Company C has been restructured from an engineering unit to a detachment of the 1221st Transportation Company, headquartered in Dexter, Missouri.

== Geography ==
The city is situated upon the Sikeston Ridge which runs north and south from 10 miles (16 km) north of Sikeston through New Madrid. Prior to 1927, the New Madrid-Sikeston Ridge Levee was constructed to protect the area from flooding from the Mississippi River. In the 1920s, the Little River Drainage District was formed to drain the low land area west of the Sikeston Ridge. By 1931, the levee construction had created the New Madrid floodway.

According to the United States Census Bureau, the city has a total area of 17.48 square miles (45.27 km^{2}), of which 17.32 square miles (44.86 km^{2}) is land and 0.16 square miles (0.41 km^{2}) is water.

=== Weather events ===
==== 1986 tornado ====
On May 15, 1986, an EF2 tornado hit the city of Sikeston and destroyed about 100 homes, prompting Governor John Ashcroft to visit and call on the National Guard for assistance. On the same day, the nearby community of Vanduser was also hit by a tornado while storms precipitated flooding to the north in Cape Girardeau.

==== 2009 storm ====
Sikeston and the surrounding area were hit by the January 2009 Central Plains and Midwest ice storm. This storm knocked out electrical service to large parts of the city for several days and damaged a large percentage of the trees, making this event the worst natural disaster to hit the city since at least the 1986 tornado. Restoration of city electrical power was delayed as a circuit breaker at the Coleman Substation had exploded on January 21 just before the ice storm hit. Governor Jay Nixon surveyed the fog-covered damage by helicopter and visited the Sikeston Field House which was being used as a shelter.

==== 2024 tornado ====
Another tornado would move through Sikeston during the morning hours of May 26, 2024. It caused EF3 damage southwest of Sikeston, EF1 damage in the city itself, and EF2 damage in the northeastern part of the city. Many homes, businesses, and other structures were heavily damaged and dozens of trees and power poles were snapped. Two indirect fatalities were confirmed from this tornado.

==== 2025 tornado ====
A significant tornado would strike areas of Scott County, particularly northern Sikeston. Forty to fifty homes in Sikeston sustained major damage, where one of the two deaths caused by the tornado occurred.

=== Climate ===
Climate data for Sikeston, Missouri (1991–2020 normals, extremes 1950–present)
Month	Jan	Feb	Mar	Apr	May	Jun	Jul	Aug	Sep	Oct	Nov	Dec	Year
Record high °F (°C)	73 (23)	78 (26)	85 (29)	93 (34)	101 (38)	110 (43)	107 (42)	106 (41)	102 (39)	95 (35)	85 (29)	74 (23)	110 (43)
Mean daily maximum °F (°C)	44.2 (6.8)	49.2 (9.6)	59.2 (15.1)	70.6 (21.4)	80.5 (26.9)	88.8 (31.6)	91.4 (33.0)	90.3 (32.4)	83.9 (28.8)	72.6 (22.6)	58.4 (14.7)	47.7 (8.7)	69.7 (20.9)
Daily mean °F (°C)	36.0 (2.2)	39.9 (4.4)	48.9 (9.4)	59.6 (15.3)	69.9 (21.1)	78.3 (25.7)	81.0 (27.2)	79.3 (26.3)	72.0 (22.2)	60.7 (15.9)	48.6 (9.2)	39.8 (4.3)	59.5 (15.3)
Mean daily minimum °F (°C)	27.8 (−2.3)	30.7 (−0.7)	38.7 (3.7)	48.6 (9.2)	59.3 (15.2)	67.9 (19.9)	70.7 (21.5)	68.3 (20.2)	60.2 (15.7)	48.9 (9.4)	38.9 (3.8)	31.8 (−0.1)	49.3 (9.6)
Record low °F (°C)	−10 (−23)	−12 (−24)	−4 (−20)	24 (−4)	31 (−1)	46 (8)	48 (9)	41 (5)	34 (1)	19 (−7)	2 (−17)	−12 (−24)	−12 (−24)
Average precipitation inches (mm)	3.68 (93)	4.25 (108)	4.96 (126)	5.50 (140)	4.74 (120)	4.26 (108)	3.87 (98)	3.32 (84)	3.21 (82)	3.57 (91)	4.20 (107)	4.08 (104)	49.64 (1,261)
Average snowfall inches (cm)	0.8 (2.0)	1.2 (3.0)	0.6 (1.5)	0.0 (0.0)	0.0 (0.0)	0.0 (0.0)	0.0 (0.0)	0.0 (0.0)	0.0 (0.0)	0.1 (0.25)	0.0 (0.0)	0.4 (1.0)	3.1 (7.9)
Average precipitation days (≥ 0.01 in)	8.4	7.9	10.0	9.9	10.3	8.4	6.9	6.1	6.2	6.3	7.5	8.7	96.6
Average snowy days (≥ 0.1 in)	0.3	1.0	0.2	0.0	0.0	0.0	0.0	0.0	0.0	0.0	0.1	0.5	2.1
Source: NOAA

== Demographics ==
Historical population
Census	Pop.	Note	%±
1880	191		—
1890	636		233.0%
1900	1,077		69.3%
1910	3,327		208.9%
1920	3,613		8.6%
1930	5,676		57.1%
1940	7,944		40.0%
1950	11,640		46.5%
1960	13,765		18.3%
1970	14,699		6.8%
1980	17,431		18.6%
1990	17,641		1.2%
2000	16,992		−3.7%
2010	16,318		−4.0%
2020	16,291		−0.2%

=== 2020 census ===
As of the 2020 census, Sikeston had a population of 16,291. The median age was 38.8 years. 25.2% of residents were under the age of 18 and 18.9% of residents were 65 years of age or older. For every 100 females there were 88.7 males, and for every 100 females age 18 and over there were 82.6 males age 18 and over.

98.7% of residents lived in urban areas, while 1.3% lived in rural areas.

There were 6,704 households in Sikeston, of which 30.8% had children under the age of 18 living in them. Of all households, 37.9% were married-couple households, 19.1% were households with a male householder and no spouse or partner present, and 36.4% were households with a female householder and no spouse or partner present. About 32.7% of all households were made up of individuals and 14.4% had someone living alone who was 65 years of age or older.

There were 7,328 housing units, of which 8.5% were vacant. The homeowner vacancy rate was 2.4% and the rental vacancy rate was 6.4%.

Racial composition as of the 2020 census
Race	Number	Percent
White	10,495	64.4%
Black or African American	4,513	27.7%
American Indian and Alaska Native	43	0.3%
Asian	134	0.8%
Native Hawaiian and Other Pacific Islander	4	0.0%
Some other race	222	1.4%
Two or more races	880	5.4%
Hispanic or Latino (of any race)	496	3.0%

=== Income and poverty ===
The 2016–2020 5-year American Community Survey estimates show that the median household income was $42,702 (with a margin of error of +/- $5,514) and the median family income was $57,061 (+/- $10,238). Males had a median income of $35,885 (+/- $5,267) versus $26,312 (+/- $2,894) for females. The median income for those above 16 years old was $28,729 (+/- $2,602). Approximately, 18.7% of families and 20.0% of the population were below the poverty line, including 31.7% of those under the age of 18 and 8.4% of those ages 65 or over.

=== 2010 census ===
As of the census of 2010, there were 16,318 people, 6,749 households, and 4,326 families residing in the city. The population density was 942.1 inhabitants per square mile (363.7/km^{2}). There were 7,289 housing units at an average density of 420.8 per square mile (162.5/km^{2}). The racial makeup of the city was 69.95% White, 26.20% Black or African American, 0.15% Native American, 0.85% Asian, 0.04% Native Hawaiian or Pacific Islander, 0.80% from other races, and 2.01% from two or more races. Hispanic or Latino of any race were 2.32% of the population.

There were 6,749 households, of which 32.5% had children under the age of 18 living with them, 41.1% were married couples living together, 18.6% had a female householder with no husband present, 4.4% had a male householder with no wife present, and 35.9% were non-families. 31.1% of all households were made up of individuals, and 13.1% had someone living alone who was 65 years of age or older. The average household size was 2.37 and the average family size was 2.96.

The median age in the city was 38.5 years. 25.1% of residents were under the age of 18; 8.6% were between the ages of 18 and 24; 24.1% were from 25 to 44; 26.2% were from 45 to 64; and 16% were 65 years of age or older. The gender makeup of the city was 45.8% male and 54.2% female.

=== 2000 census ===
As of the census of 2000, there were 16,992 people, 6,779 households, and 4,602 families residing in the city. The population density was 947.4 inhabitants per square mile (365.8/km^{2}). There were 7,428 housing units at an average density of 414.2 per square mile (159.9/km^{2}). The racial makeup of the city was 75.52% White, 22.36% African American, 0.27% Native American, 0.37% Asian, 0.49% from other races, and 0.99% from two or more races. Hispanic or Latino of any race were 1.20% of the population.

The major reported ancestries in Sikeston are 17.1% American, 11.8% German, 11.5% Irish, 6.8% English, 2.9% French, and 1.5% Scotch-Irish.

There were 6,779 households, out of which 33.5% had children under the age of 18 living with them, 46.7% were married couples living together, 17.8% had a female householder with no husband present, and 32.1% were non-families. 28.6% of all households were made up of individuals, and 13.1% had someone living alone who was 65 years of age or older. The average household size was 2.45 and the average family size was 2.98.

In the city, the population was spread out, with 27.6% under the age of 18, 8.5% from 18 to 24, 26.2% from 25 to 44, 22.2% from 45 to 64, and 15.5% who were 65 years of age or older. The median age was 36 years. For every 100 females, there were 85.9 males. For every 100 females age 18 and over, there were 78.2 males.

The median income for a household in the city was $32,872, and the median income for a family was $36,420. Males had a median income of $31,846 versus $19,623 for females. The per capita income for the city was $15,509. About 16.2% of families and 21.0% of the population were below the poverty line, including 33.3% of those under age 18 and 12.0% of those age 65 or over.

== Economy ==
As measured in 2008, the cost of living index in Sikeston is low (80.4) compared to the U.S. average of 100. The unemployment rate was 7.6 percent in Sikeston.

- The major city employers include Unilever, Missouri Delta Medical Center, the Sikeston Public Schools system, and Wal-Mart.
- In 1904, the Little River Drainage District was formed. Agriculture products of the area include cotton, soybeans, corn, rice, watermelons, wheat, milo, potatoes, and poultry with native trees that include oak and cypress. Historically, the city was known for its two large flour mills.
- Sikeston is the headquarters for Montgomery Bank which is the largest privately owned, family-operated bank in Missouri. The bank began in 1903 as the T. L. Wright Private Bank in Doniphan, Missouri. In 1955, Tom Baker of Sikeston purchased the charter and established Planters Bank. In 1957, Joel Montgomery acquired controlling interest in the bank and renamed it First National Bank. In 1993, the Sikeston location moved into a new five-story building. It was renamed Montgomery Bank in 2004.
- In 1931, the Sikeston Board of Municipal Utilities was established to provide electrical service to the city. The current Sikeston Power Plant is a 235 megawatt coal-fired steam generating facility with excess capacity sold to other communities. This power plant began serving the city in 1981 after seven years of initial planning. The city's first coal-fired electric plant, the 6-megawatt E.P. Coleman plant, was built in 1958. The Sikeston Board of Municipal Utilities operates the city's water and sewer services and a 33-mile (53 km) fiber optic communications network.

== Arts and culture ==
Sikeston has long been associated with country music. Some performers at the local Jaycee rodeo have included Kenny Rogers in 1977 and Loretta Lynn in 1983 with Charlie Daniels and Lee Greenwood performing multiple times. Upon his visit, Kenny Rogers donated an Arabian stallion to be auctioned off to bring money to the local cerebral palsy center which in appreciation changed its name to the Kenny Rogers Children's Center.

In addition, the Sikeston Missouri Arts Council and the Sikeston Art League offer community concerts, cultural performances and art shows throughout the year. The Sikeston Little Theater is the oldest performing arts group between St. Louis and Memphis. The Arts Council's Missoula Children's Theater give annual performances. The new Albritton Mayer Center for the arts provides a home for a host of multimedia cultural presentations.

Sikeston has a lending library, the Sikeston Public Library.

== Parks and recreation ==
Sikeston's Park system includes 16 parks. The largest park, the Sikeston Recreation Complex, features a fishing lake, picnic shelters and playground equipment. With tennis courts, Pickelball courts, and several soccer fields, baseball diamonds and a little league football field, the Recreation Complex is home to a number of sporting events, including state and regional tournaments.

Parks include Armory Park, Central Park, Clayton Park, Dudley Park, American Legion Park, Lincoln Park, Malone Park, Mary Lou Montgomery Park, North End Park, Norton Park, R.S. Matthews Park, Roberta Rowe West End Park, Rotary Park, Sikeston Recreation Complex, and Veterans Park.

Sikeston is also the home of VFW Stadium, the city's largest local baseball field; the Sikeston Depot, the city museum; and Sikeston's American Legion-sponsored Cotton Carnival and Parade began in 1944 as a homecoming to some World War II veterans. The parade, one of the largest in Missouri, featured floats, area marching bands, and state and national politicians.

== Education ==
Of all residents in Sikeston who are 25 years of age and older, 73.3% hold a high school diploma or higher as their highest educational attainment; 14.2% possess a bachelor's degree or higher; 5.0% hold a graduate or professional degree; and 26.7% have less than a high school diploma.

=== Public schools ===
The Sikeston School District covers the majority of the city limits. In Scott County, almost all of the portions of Sikeston are in the Sikeston district, except a small piece in the Scott County Central Schools district. In regards to the portion in New Madrid County, some of the Sikeston city limits is in the New Madrid County R-I School District while a portion is in the Sikeston district.

The Sikeston school district operates multiple schools, including Sikeston High School.

=== Private schools ===
Sikeston has four private schools that serve both the educational and religious needs of students and their families.

- St. Francis Xavier Catholic School
- Solid Rock Christian Academy
- Southeast Missouri Christian Academy
- The Christian Academy

In 1892, a local high school known as the "Methodist College" was established by the Sikeston Methodist Episcopal Church. The school was disbanded after the public high school was established.

=== Higher education and technical schools ===
- Southeast Missouri State University-Sikeston, a satellite campus of Southeast Missouri State University located in Cape Girardeau.
- The Sikeston Career and Technology Center
- Three Rivers Community College, a satellite campus from Poplar Bluff
  - Three Rivers College's service area includes both Scott County and New Madrid County.

=== Historic area public schools ===
- Baker School (c.1890 – c.1940) was located on State Highway Y near Salcedo.
- Chaney School (c.1868 – c.1948) was located on State Highway HH a mile from U.S. Highway 61.
- Crowder School (1901 – c.1950) was located near the community of Crowder on State Highway Z.
- Fairview School was located on U.S. Highway 61 about 1 mile south of U.S. Highway 60.
- Greer School (c.1912 – c.1950) was located about 1 mile from State Highway BB, absorbed by Sikeston around 1946.
- Hunter School (c.1912 – c.1950) was located near U.S. Highway 61.
- Lennox School (c.1916 – c.1953) was located at the corner of Scott County Highway 450 and Scott County Highway 453.
- McMullin School (c.1912 – c.1953) was located on Scott County Highway 450 near U.S. Highway 61.
- Miner School (c.1912 – c.1953) was located on State Highway HH.
- Morehouse High School was absorbed by Sikeston around 1968.
- Sand Prairie School (c.1912 – c.1950) was located near County Highway 446.
- Stringer School (c.1910 – c.1940) was located near State Highway Y.
- Tanner School (1907 – c.1949) near the community of Tanner burned in 1947 and was consolidated with Sikeston around 1948.

== Media ==
- The Sikeston Standard Democrat is Sikeston's daily newspaper. It derives its name from two of the city's previous newspapers -- The Democrat Advertiser and The Daily Standard which was founded in 1911 and became a daily newspaper in 1950. In 1939, The Daily Standard editor Charles "Pole Cat" Blanton was featured in Time Magazine; he had purchased the newspaper in 1913, publishing the first issue on March 1, 1913.
- Previous Sikeston newspapers have included The Sikeston Star which was founded in 1884; The Sikeston Herald, a Democrat or left-leaning Republican newspaper founded in 1903 or perhaps 1900; The Scott County Democrat and The Enterprise which was founded in 1883 and eventually became known as The Dexter Statesman; and Delta Metro, a weekly news magazine, which was published from 1975 until 1977.
- The Sikeston High School newspaper is known as The Bulldog Barker while the high school yearbook is known as The Growler.

== Infrastructure ==
=== Transportation ===
- In 1789, El Camino Real, also known as "The King's Highway," was marked out by orders from the King of Spain. In 1915, the Missouri Daughters of the American Revolution erected a monument near Woodlawn Street in Sikeston to mark this event. In 1929, the Sikeston portion of the street was paved. Today this road is known as U.S. Route 61.
- The city has a few cobble-stoned streets in its older commercial downtown area.
- The city is served by the BNSF Railway and was historically served by the Union Pacific Railroad until the tracks were removed in 2011.
- Sikeston is located at the intersection of I-55 and I-57, making it the only city in Missouri other than Kansas City, St. Louis, and Miner to be located on at least two interstate highways. Other Sikeston highways include U.S. Route 60, U.S. Route 61, U.S. Route 62, and Route 114. Sikeston's location at the intersection of U.S. Routes 60, 61, and 62 makes the city one of the few towns located at the intersection of three consecutively numbered highways.

=== Healthcare ===
Missouri Delta Medical Center was founded in Sikeston in 1948. The 200-bed hospital employs over 600 healthcare workers.

== Notable people ==
=== Politicians and attorneys ===
- Ralph Emerson Bailey, Republican one-term congressman, lived in Sikeston and is buried in the Sikeston city cemetery.
- C. F. Cline, Democrat state representative.
- Maida Coleman, Democrat from St. Louis and assistant minority leader in the Missouri Senate, was born in Sikeston in 1954.
- Charles Augustus Crow, Republican one-term congressman born on a farm near Sikeston in 1873.
- Kenny Hulshof, Republican congressman.
- Peter C. Myers, Deputy Secretary of Agriculture and state representative.
- George A. Russell, president of the University of Missouri System from 1991 to 1996.
- Alfred C. Sikes, chairman of the Federal Communications Commission.

=== Military leaders ===
- Harold E. Comstock, World War II flying ace who attended primary flying school at Sikeston.
- Clyde A. Vaughn, lieutenant general who served as director of the Army National Guard.
- Wendul G. Hagler II, major general who served as deputy commander of U.S. Army Central and twice as a defense attaché (to Saudi Arabia and the United Arab Emirates)

=== Business and community leaders ===
- Gaylon M. Lawrence, agricultural land owner and businessman.
- Thornton Wilson, former Chairman of the Board and Chief executive officer of Boeing was born on a farm near Sikeston.

=== Sports figures ===
- Charlie Babb, professional football player.
- Brandon Barnes, professional football player.
- Kenneth Dement, College Football Hall of Fame football player.
- Blake DeWitt, professional baseball player.
- Eric Hurley, professional baseball player.
- Ben Plucknett, discus thrower who held the North American record; lived on a farm near Sikeston.
- Otto Porter, Jr., basketball player for the Golden State Warriors and the Georgetown Hoyas.
- Josef Spudich, professional football player who taught and coached in Sikeston.
- Allyn Stout, professional baseball player; died in Sikeston and is also buried in Sikeston.
- Matt Whiteside, former MLB Pitcher
- James Wilder Sr., professional football player. and single-season records
- George Woods, Olympic silver medalist in shot put in 1968 and 1972.

=== Television and movie personalities and entertainers ===
- Jacqueline Scott, actress who made multiple appearances on such television shows as Gunsmoke, The Outer Limits, Bonanza, The Fugitive, Ironside, Planet of the Apes, and Barnaby Jones, was born in Sikeston on New Years Day 1932.()
- Marjorie Montgomery, child actress, dancer, and fashion designer.
- Phil Leslie, head writer for the Fibber McGee and Molly show, was born in Sikeston in 1909
- Sunset Thomas, porn film actress

=== Musicians ===
- Neal E. Boyd, born in Sikeston, Missouri, was a pop-opera singer and 2008 winner of America's Got Talent. He was known throughout the world as "The Voice of Missouri."

=== Scientists ===
- Kristina Curry Rogers, paleontologist who named two dinosaur species

=== Authors ===
- Ronald Anderson, sociology professor and author, born in Sikeston
- Richard B. Hoover, author of 33 volumes and 250 scientific papers, born in Sikeston
- Rex Miller (1939-2004), former detective novelist and disc jockey
- Jean Marie Stine, a writer and publisher who was once editor of Galaxy Science Fiction magazine
- Terry Teachout, critic, biographer, playwright, and blogger
- Robert Vaughan, author of over 200 books has lived in Sikeston

=== Artists ===
- Michael Parkes, fantasy artist and former resident of Canalou who was born in Sikeston.

== In fiction ==
- Sikeston is the setting for the films Love Takes Wing and Love Finds a Home
- The 1962 film The Intruder, starring William Shatner and directed by Roger Corman, features scenes shot on location in downtown Sikeston and at the old courthouse in Charleston.
