= Commerce, Missouri =

- Village
- Location of Commerce, Missouri
- Coordinates: 37°09′30″N 89°26′48″W
- Country: United States
- State: Missouri
- County: Scott

Area
  - Total: 0.35 sq mi (0.90 km^{2})
  - Land: 0.35 sq mi (0.90 km^{2})
  - Water: 0 sq mi (0.00 km^{2})
- Elevation: 348 ft (106 m)

Population (2020)
  - Total: 45
  - Density: 130.1/sq mi (50.22/km^{2})
- Time zone: UTC-6 (Central (CST))
  - Summer (DST): UTC-5 (CDT)
- ZIP code: 63742
- Area code: 573
- FIPS code: 29-15760
- GNIS feature ID: 2398607

Commerce is a Mississippi River village in Scott County, Missouri, United States. As of the 2020 census, Commerce had a population of 45.

== History ==
In 1788, the present site of Commerce was first occupied by French settlers, making Commerce apparently the third-oldest present-site settlement in Missouri after St Louis and St. Charles as Ste. Genevieve was moved from its original location. A trading post established in 1803 served as the center of commerce for the region, hence the name of the settlement. In 1823, the circuit court ordered a board of commissioners to be appointed to lay out lots here.

Commerce was one of the few areas in Scott County to have uninterrupted mail service during the Civil War, as guerilla bands elsewhere made delivery unsafe for the northern carriers. Commerce, along with the German settlement of New Hamburg, were the two enclaves of Union sympathizers in Scott County during the war. On November 1, 1861, Colonel Oglesby landed in Commerce with about 3,000 men, where his soldiers soon exchanged shots with M. Jeff Thompson — who raided the Commerce on December 29, 1861. On February 21, 1862, General Pope landed here with 140 troops, but when he left a week later his force consisted of 26,153 men. The island in front of Commerce was known as Cat Island at least as early as Mark Twain's time; however, it has been absorbed by Powers Island to the south.

Scott County courthouse records were moved to a military post at Cape Girardeau during the Civil War. Around August 1863, the county seat of Scott County was informally moved to Commerce. On January 26, 1864, this move was made official by the legislature of Missouri. In 1864, a brick was built in Commerce for this purpose. In 1878, the county seat was returned to Benton, and the old temporary courthouse brick building then was converted into a grade school. Around the time in 1875, the Vincent Heisserer saloon building erected in 1867 was converted into a Masonic hall. Commerce was originally a Methodist town, with a congregation established as early as 1825 and without a Baptist church until 1906.

== Geography ==
According to the United States Census Bureau, the village has a total area of 0.35 square miles (0.91 km^{2}), all land.

== Demographics ==
Historical population
Census	Pop.	Note	%±
1880	440		—
1900	588		—
1910	544		−7.5%
1920	593		9.0%
1930	351		−40.8%
1940	413		17.7%
1950	360		−12.8%
1960	247		−31.4%
1970	234		−5.3%
1980	199		−15.0%
1990	173		−13.1%
2000	110		−36.4%
2010	67		−39.1%
2020	45		−32.8%

=== 2010 census ===
As of the census of 2010, there were 67 people, 30 households, and 18 families living in the village. The population density was 191.4 inhabitants per square mile (73.9/km^{2}). There were 41 housing units at an average density of 117.1 per square mile (45.2/km^{2}). The racial makeup of the village was 92.54% White and 7.46% Black or African American.

There were 30 households, of which 23.3% had children under the age of 18 living with them, 56.7% were married couples living together, 3.3% had a female householder with no husband present, and 40.0% were non-families. 36.7% of all households were made up of individuals, and 26.7% had someone living alone who was 65 years of age or older. The average household size was 2.23 and the average family size was 2.94.

The median age in the village was 46.5 years. 19.4% of residents were under the age of 18; 12.1% were between the ages of 18 and 24; 16.5% were from 25 to 44; 29.8% were from 45 to 64; and 22.4% were 65 years of age or older. The gender makeup of the village was 56.7% male and 43.3% female.

=== 2000 census ===
As of the census of 2000, there were 110 people, 42 households, and 30 families living in the village. The population density was 344.0 inhabitants per square mile (132.8/km^{2}). There were 49 housing units at an average density of 153.3 per square mile (59.2/km^{2}). The racial makeup of the village was 96.36% White, 2.73% African American, 0.91% from other races. Hispanic or Latino of any race were 1.82% of the population.

There were 42 households, out of which 33.3% had children under the age of 18 living with them, 64.3% were married couples living together, 7.1% had a female householder with no husband present, and 26.2% were non-families. 26.2% of all households were made up of individuals, and 14.3% had someone living alone who was 65 years of age or older. The average household size was 2.62 and the average family size was 3.13.

In the village the population was spread out, with 26.4% under the age of 18, 8.2% from 18 to 24, 25.5% from 25 to 44, 29.1% from 45 to 64, and 10.9% who were 65 years of age or older. The median age was 38 years. For every 100 females, there were 111.5 males. For every 100 females age 18 and over, there were 102.5 males.

The median income for a household in the village was $36,667, and the median income for a family was $48,750. Males had a median income of $33,125 versus $16,607 for females. The per capita income for the village was $17,552. There were no families and 4.3% of the population living below the poverty line, including no under eighteens and 28.6% of those over 64.

== Education ==
It is in the Scott County R-IV School District.

Prior to 1954, the community had its own school district. That year, it consolidated into Scott County R-IV.

Three Rivers College's service area includes Scott County.
