= National Register of Historic Places listings in New Madrid County, Missouri =

Location of New Madrid County in Missouri

This is a list of the National Register of Historic Places listings in New Madrid County, Missouri.

This is intended to be a complete list of the properties and districts on the National Register of Historic Places in New Madrid County, Missouri, United States. Latitude and longitude coordinates are provided for many National Register properties and districts; these locations may be seen together in a map.

There are 10 properties and districts listed on the National Register in the county.

This National Park Service list is complete through NPS recent listings posted February 27, 2026.

== Current listings ==
	Name on the Register	Image	Date listed	Location	City or town	Description
1	Double Bridges Archeological Site		July 25, 1974 (#74001085)	2.5 miles (4.0 km) north of Stewart, along Open Bayou; 36°24′38″N 89°37′00″W	Portageville	
2	Howardville School	Howardville School	November 22, 2017 (#100001847)	6916 U.S. Route 61; 36°34′04″N 89°36′10″W	Howardville	
3	Hunter-Dawson House	Hunter-Dawson House	August 28, 2012 (#12000563)	312 Dawson Rd. 36°35′48″N 89°31′31″W	New Madrid	
4	Hurricane Ridge Site		November 9, 1972 (#72000725)	Address restricted	Catron	
5	King II Archeological Site		June 26, 1975 (#75001070)	Address restricted	Howardville	
6	La Plant Archeological Site		July 25, 1974 (#74001084)	Northwest of Bayouville at the center of the northeastern quarter of Section 1, Township 23 North, Range 15 East; 36°40′07″N 89°22′42″W	La Forge	
7	Lilbourn Fortified Village Archeological Site	Lilbourn Fortified Village Archeological Site	July 29, 1969 (#69000118)	U.S. Routes 61/62, in and east of Mound Cemetery; 36°34′17″N 89°35′15″W	Lilbourn	
8	Portwood Village and Mound		November 25, 1977 (#77000812)	Address restricted	Portageville	
9	Sikeston Fortified Village Archeological Site		February 12, 1971 (#71000471)	South of Sikeston near the confluence of the North Cut and St. John's Ditches; 36°48′55″N 89°33′35″W	Sikeston	
10	St. Johns-Laplant IV Archeological District		August 28, 1975 (#75001069)	Southeastern quarter of the southwestern quarter of Section 11, Township 23 North, Range 15 East; 36°38′47″N 89°24′21″W	Bayouville	

== See also ==
- List of National Historic Landmarks in Missouri
- National Register of Historic Places listings in Missouri
