= List of Missouri conservation areas – Southeast region =

Map of Missouri conservation areas with the Southeast region highlighted

The Southeast administrative region of the Missouri Department of Conservation encompasses Bollinger, Butler, Cape Girardeau, Dunklin, Iron, Madison, Mississippi, New Madrid, Pemiscot, Perry, Reynolds, Scott, Ste. Genevieve, St. Francois, Stoddard, and Wayne counties. The regional conservation office is in Cape Girardeau.

Conservation Area	Description	Size		County	Location
Conservation Area	Description	acres	ha	County	Location
Allred Lake Natural Area	The 160-acre (0.65 km^{2}) area contains 53 acres (210,000 m^{2}) of forest and the Allred Lake Natural Area. Facilities/features: 1/4-mile trail ending in a short boardwalk, viewing deck, and Allred Lake (7 acres).	164	66	Butler	36°31′8.29″N 90°25′6.55″W
Amidon Memorial Conservation Area	The area is nearly all forest. Facilities/features: permanent stream (Castor River) and Castor River Shut-ins Natural Area.	1,721	696	Bollinger, Madison	37°33′1.72″N 90°9′31.14″W
Apple Creek Conservation Area	This area contains forest, old fields, croplands, and wetlands. Facilities/features: boat ramp, primitive camping, firearms range, fishing ponds, and permanent stream (Apple Creek).	2,119	858	Cape Girardeau	37°33′28.38″N 89°33′28.43″W
Ball Mill Resurgence	This forest area contains a sink at the base of a 50-foot (15 m) limestone bluff. Rocks fall into the basin and are tumbled smooth by water that backs up into the sinkhole after heavy rain.	24	9.7	Perry	37°48′11.66″N 89°53′18.44″W
Big Cane Conservation Area	This area is primarily forest with some wetlands. Facilities/features: permanent stream.	2,136	864	Butler	36°31′38.89″N 90°27′42.10″W
Bird's Blue Hole	This is a forest area with a fishable lake and a boat ramp within 1-mile (1.6 km) of the Mississippi River.	0.6	0.24	Mississippi	36°57′51.85″N 89°7′37.66″W
Bismarck Conservation Area	Facilities/features: boat ramp, fishing jetty, and DiSalvo Lake (210 acres).	1,159	469	St. Francois, Iron, Washington	37°43′37.62″N 90°38′18.68″W
Black Island Conservation Area (Desoto Unit)	This area is located at the far southeast corner of Black Island. It is very flat and contains a combination of bottomland forest, in various stages of succession, and old fields. All public use is prohibited, except fishing and waterfowl hunting by boat only, when the Mississippi River water level is at or above 28 feet on the Caruthersville gauge.	718	291	Pemiscot	36°15′47″N 89°34′45″W
Black Island Conservation Area (Gayoso Bend Unit)	This area is all forest, including 125 acres of wooded sloughs. There are 2 miles of Mississippi River frontage on the east side. Access is limited to walk-in or boat-in only. All public use is prohibited, except fishing and waterfowl hunting by boat only, when the Mississippi River water level is at or above 28 feet on the Caruthersville gauge.	968	392	Pemiscot	36°15′16.38″N 89°40′54.97″W
Black Island Conservation Area (Stephen C Bradford Unit)	This area contains a recently-abandoned channel of the Mississippi River. There are 20 wetland pools managed for waterfowl, wading birds, and shorebirds. There is a gravel boat ramp that enables access to the Gayoso Bend unit. All public use is prohibited, except fishing and waterfowl hunting by boat only, when the Mississippi River water level is at or above 28 feet on the Caruthersville gauge.	6,430	2,600	Pemiscot	36°16′35.15″N 89°41′18.64″W
Black Island CA (Wolf Bayou Unit)	This area contains bottomland forest and Wolf Bayou, one of the state's last natural lowland lakes. Facilities/features: boat ramp, Wolf Bayou (43 fishable acres), and Wolf Bayou Natural Area. All public use is prohibited, except fishing and waterfowl hunting by boat only, when the Mississippi River water level is at or above 28 feet on the Caruthersville gauge.	276	112	Pemiscot	36°19′0.01″N 89°38′34.53″W
Block Hole Access	This area provides access to the Headwater Diversion Channel.	16	6.5	Cape Girardeau	37°12′49.31″N 89°50′29.80″W
Buford Mountain Conservation Area	This is a forest area.	3,920	1,590	Iron, Washington	37°42′51.62″N 90°42′11.28″W
Cape Woods Conservation Area	This is a forested area with an asphalt walking trail system. Facilities/features: bottomland forest, permanent stream (Cape LaCroix Creek), restrooms, and a walking trail.	40	16	Cape Girardeau	37°19′28.99″N 89°34′9.95″W
Cash (Ben) Memorial Conservation Area	Mostly forest with some old fields. Facilities/features: boat ramp, Cash Swamp Natural Area (bottomland hardwoods, swamp), and a permanent stream (St. Francis River).	1,392	563	Dunklin	36°10′33.10″N 90°13′6.33″W
Castor River Conservation Area	It is nearly all forest and is home to Blue Pond Natural Area. Blue Pond is the deepest natural pond in Missouri. Facilities/features: primitive camping, multi-use hike/bike/horse trail, numerous intermittent streams, and 1 permanent stream.	9,999	4,046	Bollinger	37°14′8.30″N 90°10′10.98″W
Centerville Access	This forest area offers access to the West Fork of the Black River.	42	17	Reynolds	37°26′51.05″N 90°57′52.88″W
Chalk Bluff Trail Access	This area is mostly old fields. Facilities/features: boat ramp, a permanent stream (St. Francis River), and a Civil War battle site.	84	34	Dunklin	36°28′52.10″N 90°9′26.24″W
Clearwater Conservation Area	Webb Creek flows through this forest area, which lies to the south of Clearwater Lake. Natural features of interest include 2 fens, a rhyolite knob, a sinkhole pond, and a dry sink.	11,563	4,679	Reynolds	37°7′3.62″N 90°51′31.35″W
Clearwater Lake Management Lands	Facilities/features: boat ramps, fishing docks, picnic areas, viewing blinds, and Clearwater Lake (1,630 acres).	17,062	6,905	Wayne, Reynolds	37°12′44.60″N 90°47′44.92″W
Coldwater Access	This old field and forest area offers access to the St. Francis River.	77	31	Wayne	37°18′8.44″N 90°28′4.41″W
Coldwater Conservation Area	This is a predominantly forest area. Facilities/features: hiking trails, four intermittent streams, and a permanent stream (Wilmore Creek).	11,655	4,717	Wayne	37°14′39.85″N 90°19′20.58″W
Coon Island Conservation Area	This is primarily a wetland area with significant forest acreage. Facilities/features: 2 boat ramps and 2 permanent streams (Black River and Swift Ditch).	3,238	1,310	Butler	36°32′11.95″N 90°21′44.01″W
Corkwood Conservation Area	This area is primarily forest with wetlands and grassland.	442	179	Butler	36°33′3.67″N 90°32′5.54″W
Current River Conservation Area	This is a predominantly forest area. Facilities/features: picnic area, fishing jetties, Buford Pond (3 acres, fishable), Blue Springs Natural Area (17 acres), Cardareva Bluff Natural Area (95 aces), and a permanent stream (Current River).	29,776	12,050	Shannon, Reynolds, Carter	37°9′2.46″N 91°4′6.23″W
Dan River Access	This area is mostly forest with a small wetlands. It offers access to the Black River. There is a boat ramp.	78	32	Butler	36°42′5.97″N 90°19′58.14″W
Delaney (Robert G) Lake Conservation Area	In addition to Delaney Lake, there is bottomland forest, a boat ramp, and a fishing jetty.	165	67	Mississippi	36°57′22.53″N 89°22′27.08″W
Donaldson Point Conservation Area	This is a predominantly forest area with large stands of bottomland hardwoods. Facilities/features: improved camping, fishable lakes and ponds, and a permanent stream (Mississippi River).	5,745	2,325	New Madrid	36°32′39.51″N 89°26′37.97″W
Dorena Access	This area has a boat ramp that offers access to the Mississippi River.	15	6.1	Mississippi	36°36′53.26″N 89°12′28.50″W
Duck Creek Conservation Area	This area contains 2,400 acres (9.7 km^{2}) of wetland in addition to forest and some cropland. Facilities/features: 4 boat ramps, boat rentals, boat dock, primitive camping, 6 fishing jetties, and lake (1,800 acres).	6,322	2,558	Stoddard, Bollinger, Wayne	37°3′57.25″N 90°5′7.35″W
Duck Creek Conservation Area (Dark Cypress Swamp Unit)	This area consists of restored wetlands, bottomland forest and swamp communities. Wetlands were restored through the Wetland Reserve Program (WRP) in cooperation with the Natural Resources Conservation Service.	6,322	2,558	Stoddard, Bollinger, Wayne	37°8′16.43″N 89°59′2.32″W
Duck Creek Conservation Area (Greenbrier Unit)	This area is equally divided between forest and cropland. Facilities/features: boat ramp, primitive camping, and a permanent stream (Castor River).	6,322	2,558	Stoddard, Bollinger, Wayne	37°6′16.63″N 90°2′8.20″W
Fisk Access	This area offers access to the St. Francis River. There is a boat ramp.	2	0.81	Butler	36°46′51.30″N 90°12′7.57″W
Flatwoods Conservation Area	Facilities/features: firearms/archery ranges and 2 intermittent streams.	943	382	Wayne	37°8′45.07″N 90°36′30.78″W
Funk Memorial State Forest and Wildlife Area	This is a forest area with a fen and a small lake.	181	73	Iron	37°18′32.67″N 90°43′40.52″W
General Watkins Conservation Area	Mostly forest (1007 acres total), but also has a nice mix of 30 wildlife food plots (30 acres total), 5 native warm season grass fields (20 acres total) and 10 acres (40,000 m^{2}) of old fields. Facilities/features: camping area, picnic area, 9 fishable lakes and ponds.	1,118	452	Scott	37°3′46.85″N 89°37′25.50″W
Gipsy Towersite	The area is almost completely forest.	39	16	Bollinger	37°6′23.28″N 90°11′54.09″W
Girvin (John L and Georgia) Conservation Area	This area is predominantly a bottomland forest on the Mississippi River.	680	280	New Madrid, Pemiscot	36°21′18.97″N 89°32′29.16″W
Grassy Towersite	The area is almost completely forest.	39	16	Bollinger	37°16′54.27″N 90°3′55.38″W
Graves Mountain Conservation Area	This is a mostly forest area. Facilities/features: 3 intermittent streams.	3,235	1,309	Iron, Wayne	37°16′6.93″N 90°32′18.58″W
Gruner Ford Access	This area offers access to the St. Francis River.	21	8.5	St. Francois	37°44′18.67″N 90°25′42.29″W
Hammer (Bradley A) Memorial Conservation Area	This is area is mostly forested. Facilities/features: fishable pond.	331	134	Wayne	36°57′34.08″N 90°33′35.51″W
Harviell Access	This forest area offers access to Cane Creek. There is a boat ramp.	40	16	Butler	36°40′23.02″N 90°28′15.31″W
Hawn Access	This area consists of some forested land along with small crop fields planted to small grains and green browse food plots. Trees have been planted along the edge of the stream to create a sufficient riparian corridor.	80	32	Bollinger	37°25′19.07″N 90°5′35.55″W
Headwaters Access	This area has a boat ramp on the Castor River Diversion Channel. From the ramp, it is 3 miles (4.8 km) downstream to the Mississippi River.	13	5.3	Cape Girardeau	37°14′43.95″N 89°33′58.01″W
Hickory Canyons Natural Area	This area harbors a number of unique plant communities, espcially on the sandstone cliff faces. There are also areas of mesic sandstone forest, which is uncommon in Missouri. There are two hiking trails.	921	373	Ste. Genevieve	37°53′25.71″N 90°19′5.25″W
Hilliard Access	Hilliard Access is 2 miles (3.2 km) north of Poplar Bluff on Route W. This area offers access to the Black River. There is a boat ramp.	1	0.40	Butler	36°49′17.56″N 90°25′21.17″W
Hornersville Access	There is a boat ramp.	13	5.3	Dunklin	36°2′35.35″N 90°6′20.28″W
Hornersville Swamp Conservation Area	This is a mostly bottomland forest area with cropland and wetlands. Facilities/features: boat ramp and 5 floodways.	3,226	1,306	Dunklin	36°2′2.55″N 90°5′35.19″W
Iron Bridge Access	This area offers access to Bear Creek.	65	26	Wayne	37°9′14.96″N 90°16′26.12″W
James Clark Access	This site has a parking lot and slide in type canoe launch. Bank fishing is also permitted.	9	3.6	Butler	36°52′1.16″N 90°14′59.16″W
Ketcherside Mountain Conservation Area	This area is mostly forest. Facilities/features: picnic area, Royal Gorge Natural Area, and St. Francois Mountains Natural Area.	4,996	2,022	Reynolds, Iron	37°32′45.26″N 90°41′33.73″W
Knob Lick Towersite	This is a predominantly forest area.	79	32	St. Francois	37°39′43.89″N 90°23′8.46″W
Lake Girardeau Conservation Area	This area is primarily old fields and forest. Facilities/features: boat ramp, picnic areas, fishing dock, Lake Girardeau (162 acres).	344	139	Cape Girardeau	37°17′5.03″N 89°50′18.26″W
Leadwood Access	This area offers access to Big River.	8	3.2	St. Francois	37°52′8.43″N 90°35′7.93″W
Lesterville Access	This forest area offers access to the Black River.	42	17	Reynolds	37°25′1.91″N 90°49′37.92″W
Little River Conservation Area	This area contains cropland and wetlands. Facilities/features: boat ramp, Combs Lake (150 acres), disabled-accessible fishing dock, and 6 fishing jetties.	1,057	428	Dunklin, Pemiscot	36°14′49.31″N 89°57′52.89″W
Little Whitewater Conservation Area	This is a forested area with 1 permanent stream.	85	34	Bollinger	37°33′2.89″N 90°5′4.79″W
Logan Creek Conservation Area	This is a forest area. Facilities/features: 1/2 acre shrub swamp, gasconade dolomite sinkhole, 2 roubidoux dolomite sink holes, and roubidoux dolomite glade.	11,983	4,849	Reynolds	37°16′54.75″N 91°4′53.65″W
Lon Sanders Canyon Conservation Area	This is a forest area with shut-ins on McKenzie Creek.	128	52	Wayne	37°10′47.53″N 90°41′6.57″W
Magnolia Hollow Conservation Area	This is a forest area with some old fields. Facilities/features: skeet range, archery range, and a permanent stream (Establishment Creek).	1,739	704	Ste. Genevieve	38°2′10.83″N 90°7′39.57″W
Maintz Wildlife Preserve	This area features many small fields with sections of woodland, cropland, and old fields all managed for early successional habitat. Facilities/features: primitive camping, archery range, and 5 fishable ponds (12 acres).	844	342	Cape Girardeau	37°28′54.47″N 89°47′57.82″W
Maple Flats Access	Facilities/features: boat ramp and a permanent stream (Castor River).	68	28	Bollinger	37°8′54.45″N 90°4′13.98″W
Marquand Access	This area offers access to the Castor River.	71	29	Madison	37°23′7.34″N 90°9′24.02″W
Millstream Gardens Conservation Area	This is a predominantly forest area that includes 20 acres (81,000 m^{2}) of shut-ins on the St. Francis River. Facilities/features: boat ramp, picnic area, pavilion, archery range, and St. Francis River Natural Area.	682	276	Madison	37°34′22.93″N 90°28′3.43″W
Moore (Jos Hunter) Access	This area has a boat ramp that offers access to the Mississippi River.	8	3.2	Mississippi	36°54′46.09″N 89°7′19.78″W
New Madrid Bend Access	Access to the Mississippi River with a 2-lane concrete boat ramp and parking lot.	6	2.4	New Madrid	36°34′40.63″N 89°33′21.07″W
Old Plantation Access	This cropland area fronts the Whitewater River.	73	30	Cape Girardeau	37°28′7.34″N 89°50′57.04″W
Otter Slough Conservation Area	This area contains 2,200 acres (8.9 km^{2}) of wetlands as well as cropland, forest and old fields. Facilities/features: a concrete boat ramp, 21 unimproved boat ramps, primitive camping, picnic areas, 3 fishing jetties, fishing dock, Otter Lake (250 acres), and Cypress Lake.	4,849	1,962	Stoddard, Butler	36°41′44.33″N 90°8′16.47″W
Perry County Lake	This area is mostly old fields with some forest. Facilities/features: boat ramps, picnic area, fishing jetties, and Perry County Community Lake (110 acres).	317	128	Perry	37°43′10.02″N 89°54′32.86″W
Pickle Springs Natural Area	This forest tract is a Designated Natural Area containing sandstone knobs, arches, canyons, and cliffs.	261	106	Ste. Genevieve	37°48′11.09″N 90°17′45.68″W
Poplar Bluff Conservation Area	This is a forest area with cropland and a small wetlands. Facilities/features: picnic area, pavilion, archery range, Carpenter Lake (7 acres), permanent stream (Indian Creek), fishable pond (1.5 acres), and Poplar Bluff Forest Natural Area (80 acres).	1,146	464	Butler	36°48′47.97″N 90°22′46.27″W
Quarry Pond (Mineral Area College)	This is a 1-acre pond on the campus of Mineral Area College. There are two fishing docks.	2	0.81	St. Francois	37°50′52″N 90°28′38″W
Red Rock Landing Conservation Area	This area is mostly forest with some cropland.	542	219	Perry	37°44′59.84″N 89°40′9.68″W
Red Star Access	This is a Mississippi River fishing/boat ramp with a floating dock.	8	3.2	Cape Girardeau	37°18′57.75″N 89°30′44.92″W
Reynolds (S P) Access	This area offers access to the Mississippi River. There is a boat ramp.	1	0.40	Pemiscot	36°11′37.09″N 89°39′8.22″W
Ringo Ford Access	There is an unimproved boat ramp.	0	0	Butler	36°39′41.57″N 90°34′26.12″W
Riverside Conservation Area	This forest area has sinkholes and 2 intermittent streams.	2,617	1,059	Wayne, Reynolds, Iron	37°15′32.59″N 90°42′4.65″W
Rocky Creek Conservation Area	With almost 40,000 acres (160 km^{2}) of public land, the Rocky Creek Conservation Area provides for a wide range of outdoor activities. These include nature viewing, bird watching, hiking, dispersed primitive camping, and many hunting and fishing opportunities.	37,894	15,335	Shannon, Reynolds, Carter	37°7′38.77″N 91°14′12.11″W
Roselle Access	This area, with gravel boat ramp, offers access to the St. Francis River.	25	10	Madison	37°35′38.27″N 90°29′58.02″W
Sand Prairie Conservation Area	Sand dunes, blows, and sandy swales can be encountered at Sand Prairie Conservation Area. This 200-acre (0.81 km^{2}) area is being restored to native grassland, an imperiled natural community of Southeast Missouri's lowlands.	197	80	Scott	37°5′46.99″N 89°30′1.05″W
Sank Conservation Area	This area is primarily forest and old fields.	116	47	Bollinger	37°9′38.75″N 90°0′10.99″W
Seven Island Access	This area has a concrete boat ramp that offers access to the Mississippi River.	6	2.4	New Madrid	36°38′10.29″N 89°20′8.01″W
Seven Island Conservation Area	This area is mostly forest with cropland and wetlands. It offers access to a couple of fishable lakes and the Mississippi River. It is home to both swamp rabbits and nesting Mississippi kites.	1,425	577	Mississippi	36°36′44.37″N 89°17′14.69″W
Seventy-Six Conservation Area	This forest tract has several sinkholes and springs and offers scenic vistas overlooking the Mississippi River Valley.	838	339	Perry	37°43′13.01″N 89°36′46.63″W
St Mary Access	This area offers access to Old River and Saline Creek. There is a boat ramp on Old River.	10	4.0	Ste. Genevieve	37°52′42.98″N 89°56′47.49″W
Sun (Stephen J) Conservation Area	This is a forest area with cropland and a small wetlands. Facilities/features: picnic area and pavilion, archery range, Carpenter Lake (7 acres), permanent stream (Indian Creek), fishable pond (1.5 acres), and Poplar Bluff Forest Natural Area (80 acres).	499	202	Butler	36°48′27.11″N 90°22′43.88″W
Sweetgum Access	This area is primarily cropland with some forest. Facilities/features: boat ramp and a permanent stream (Castor River).	159	64	Bollinger	37°9′58.40″N 90°7′8.64″W
Swift Ditch Access	This area is mostly old field.	141	57	New Madrid	36°45′9.30″N 89°31′34.36″W
Syenite Access	This area offers access to the St. Francis River.	30	12	St. Francois	37°40′56.38″N 90°24′42.30″W
Ten Mile Pond Conservation Area	This area is predominantly cropland and wetlands, managed for dove, shorebirds, wading birds, and waterfowl.	3,760	1,520	Mississippi	36°43′35.46″N 89°19′20.54″W
Thirtyfour Corner Blue Hole	This area contains a fishable lake and a boat ramp.	2	0.81	Mississippi	36°46′24.57″N 89°10′43.75″W
Thompson Ford Access	This area offers access to the Little St. Francis River.	89	36	Madison	37°33′15.84″N 90°21′29.81″W
Tower Rock Natural Area	This forest tract on the Mississippi River contains a geologic formation known as Tower Rock. The Tower Rock Natural Area comprises about 32 acres (130,000 m^{2}) of upland oak and other mixed hardwoods. Most of the Natural Area is on the Missouri bank of the Mississippi River.	28	11	Perry	37°37′51.63″N 89°30′57.06″W
Twin Borrow Pits Conservation Area	This area is 1-mile (1.6 km) west of the Mississippi River and contains 2 small, fishable lakes (10 acres total).	75	30	Pemiscot	36°22′17.53″N 89°35′18.95″W
Tywappity Lake	Facilities/features: boat ramp, picnic area, pavilion, disabled-accessible floating fishing dock, Tywappity Community Lake (37 acres), and 2.5-mile (4.0 km) hiking trail.	118	48	Scott	37°11′28.23″N 89°38′17.15″W
Tywappity Towersite	This is a forest area.	62	25	Scott	37°11′44.92″N 89°38′12.80″W
University Forest Conservation Area	This area is predominantly forest. Facilities/features: intermittent stream (Bluewater Creek) and numerous fishless ponds.	7,190	2,910	Wayne, Butler	36°55′38.44″N 90°21′37.48″W
Wappapello Lake Management Lands	This area has forest, old fields, and cropland. Facilities/features: primitive camping, hiking trail, designated horse trail, and 3 permanent streams (St. Francis River, Logan Creek and Clark Creek). No access to Wappapello Lake from these lands.	1,957	792	Wayne	37°12′8.00″N 90°30′47.56″W
Warbler Woods Conservation Area	This is a bottomland forest area.	78	32	Dunklin	36°0′11.57″N 90°3′46.35″W
Wilhelmina Conservation Area	This area is mostly forest with some cropland. It contains a portion of the old channel of the St. Francis River.	1,512	612	Dunklin, Butler	36°32′12.73″N 90°11′19.90″W
Yokum School Conservation Area	This is a forest area.	160	65	Wayne	37°0′47.76″N 90°16′46.38″W

== Notes ==
- Acreage and counties from MDCLand GIS file
- Names, descriptions, and locations from Conservation Atlas Online GIS file
