= Big Ridge =

Big Ridge may refer to:

- Big Ridge, Missouri, a community
- Big Ridge, Nova Scotia, a community
- Big Ridge State Park, a state park in Tennessee
