= Hurricane Ridge, Missouri =

Unincorporated community in Missouri, U.S.

Coordinates: 36°38′03″N 89°39′51″W

Hurricane Ridge is an unincorporated community in New Madrid County, in the U.S. state of Missouri.

The community is on Missouri Route E approximately two miles north of Dodds. Little River flows past about 1.5 miles to the east.

== History ==
The community once had a church. The community was named for a tornado which struck the area circa 1900.
