= Don Rone Jr. =

American politician

Member of the Missouri House of Representatives from the 149th district
- In office 2015–2023
- Succeeded by: Donnie Brown

Personal details
- Born: December 21, 1944 (age 81) Cape Girardeau, Missouri
- Party: Republican
- Spouse: Myra
- Education: Southeast Missouri State University
- Occupation: teacher national guardsman farmer

Donald Rone Jr. (born December 21, 1944) is an American politician from the state of Missouri. A lifelong resident of Portageville, Missouri, he served as mayor of Portageville, Missouri, for 10 years. In 2014, he was elected as a Republican to serve as a member of the Missouri House of Representatives, representing the 149th District, which includes all of New Madrid County as well as portions of Mississippi County and Pemiscot County. In 2014, he defeated local opera singer and America's Got Talent winner Neal E. Boyd in the Republican primary and former U.S. Congressman Bill Burlison in the general election.

== Electoral history ==
Missouri's 149th District district results: 2014
Year	Republican	Votes	Pct	Republican	Votes	Pct
Missouri House of Representatives primary election, 2014	Don Rone Jr.	1,063	75.6	Neal E. Boyd	344	24.4%

Missouri's 149th District district results: 2014
Year	Republican	Votes	Pct	Democrat	Votes	Pct
Missouri House of Representatives general election, 2014	Don Rone Jr.	3,801	57.9%	Bill Burlison	2,768	42.1%
