= Frailie, Missouri =

Extinct hamlet in Missouri, U.S.

Coordinates: 36°25′05″N 89°49′02″W

Frailie is an extinct town in New Madrid County, in the U.S. state of Missouri. The GNIS classifies it as a populated place.

Frailie once had a schoolhouse. The community has the name of one Mr. Frailie, the proprietor of a local sawmill.
