= List of mayors of Portageville, Missouri =

The city of Portageville, Missouri, located in Missouri's 8th congressional district in southeastern Missouri, is one of the largest cities in New Madrid County, Missouri, one of the five oldest counties in the state.

Mayor	Took office	Left office	Additional information
Joseph Casey McCrate: (1882–1953)	c. 1933	1947	He was born in Ohio. He was the father of future mayor Joseph Edward McCrate.
Joseph Edward McCrate: (1909–1994)	1947	1953	School superintendent, bank director, hospital board member. He was born in Ohio. He was the son of former mayor Joseph Casey McCrate.
A. Henry Workman	1951	1953	
Leonard Faherty Pinkley Sr.: (1906–1992)	1953	1957	
Bailey Rutledge	1957	c. 1960	
Leeds K. Butler: (1913–1980)	c. 1960	c. 1964	
Joseph E. Christian: (1921–2009)	1965	1967	He served in the U.S. Navy from 1943 to 1945 during World War II.
Barry L. Richardson	c. 1968	1969	Resigned as mayor to be appointed to the Agriculture Stabilization and Conservation Service by Secretary of Agriculture Clifford Hardin.
Earl McCall Walker: (1926–2003)	1969		Appointed, served as acting mayor. He served in U.S. Navy during the Korean War.
Roy Moore: (1909–1979)	c. 1971	c. 1973	He had been a hardware merchant for 40 years.
Barry L. Richardson	1973	c. 1978	(Previously served as mayor.)
Don Rone, Jr.	c. 1978	1981	He was elected to the Missouri House of Representatives in 2014.
Arvil Vernell Adams: (1913–1999)	1981	1991	He served as president of the Portageville School Board, 1957–1972.
Don Rone, Jr.	c. 1991	c. 1995	(Previously served as mayor.)
James D. Patton, Sr.: (1927–2021)	c. 1995	c. 1998	He served in the U.S. Army Air Corps during World War II.
Don Day	c. 1998	c. 1999	He served as the second district commissioner of New Madrid County from 2005 until 2020.
Denis McCrate	2012	—	
Floyd Simmons	2015	2017	
Denis McCrate	2017	2019	(Previously served as mayor.) He defeated future mayor Vince Berry in a 2017 election.
Floyd Simmons	2019	2020	(Previously served as mayor.) He submitted a letter of resignation in 2020, citing health-related reasons.
Vince Berry	2020	2023	
Dennis "Rodi" Walker	2023	2025	He elected into office in 2023. His grandfather Earl McCall Walker had also been mayor.
Michael Cook Jr.	2025		He was sworn into office when mayor Rodi Walker moved outside the city limits.

== Key ==
Key to party colors and abbreviations for members of the U.S. Congress and other politicians or officials
Alaskan Independence (AKIP) Know Nothing (KN) American Labor (AL) Anti-Jacksonian (Anti-J); National Republican (NR) Anti-Administration (AA) Anti-Masonic (Anti-M) Conservative (Con) Covenant (Cov)	Democratic (D) Democratic–Farmer–Labor (DFL) Democratic–NPL (D-NPL) Dixiecrat (Dix), States' Rights (SR) Democratic-Republican (DR) Farmer–Labor (FL) Federalist (F); Pro-Administration (PA)	Free Soil (FS) Fusion (Fus) Greenback (GB) Independence (IPM) Independent Democrat (ID) Independent Republican (IR) Jacksonian (J) Liberal (Lib)	Libertarian (L) National Union (NU) Nonpartisan League (NPL) Nullifier (N) Opposition Northern (O); Opposition Southern (O) Populist (Pop) Progressive (Prog)	Prohibition (Proh) Readjuster (Rea) Republican (R) Silver (Sv) Silver Republican (SvR) Socialist (Soc) Union (U) Unconditional Union (UU)	Vermont Progressive (VP) Whig (W) Independent (I) Nonpartisan (NP)
