= Wayne Cryts =

American farmer and activist

Wayne Cryts is a former Missouri farmer who protested against American grain elevator bankruptcy law in the early 1980s.

At the time, farmers who stored crops in a grain elevator did not retain an ownership interest in the crops if the elevator company went bankrupt. Cryts worked with 500 other farmers to remove his soybeans from a bankrupt grain elevator, leading to his arrest. In response, the United States Congress passed legislation modifying the relevant law.

Cryts later ran for Congress twice, but lost both times.

== Personal life ==
Wayne Cryts and his wife Sandy lived in Puxico, Missouri, where they operated their own family farm until their marriage in 1964, when they worked on a farm together. The Cryts were members of the American Agriculture Movement, an organization that supported a fair wage for farmers, from 1978 until the 1990s.

== Grain elevator bankruptcy ==
In August 1980, the grain company in Ristine, Missouri became bankrupt. One of the grain elevators had stored Cryts' soybean crop from the prior year. Cryts traveled to Washington D.C. twice to petition the Carter administration for assistance, but there was little the government could do. In January 1981, Cryts contacted news reporters to warn the Ristine-based company that he would "take matters into his own hands" if it did not release the beans to him within the next month. When the company refused Cryts' ultimatum, Cryts embarked on a plan of civil disobedience: he would take the beans, pay off a loan that he borrowed against the beans, and accept whatever consequences came his way.

On February 16, 1981, over 3,000 farmers traveled to a group of grain elevators in New Madrid, Missouri, to support Cryts. At the elevator, a US marshal served Cryts with a court order directing that Cryts' beans be sold to pay the bankrupt company's debts. Nevertheless, Cryts, with 500 of the 3,000 farmers, spent the next two days removing the 31,000 soybean bushels from the elevator.

Most locals sympathetized with Cryts' plight. FBI agents and federal marshals did not interfere with Cryts as he removed the beans, and the media covered the story in a positive light. Local farmers sold the beans on Cryts' behalf, and a grand jury refused to indict Cryts for theft.

Because Cryts refused to identify his accomplices, the court fined him $300,000 for contempt plus an extra $1,500 per diem until payment. After arrest, he was sent to the Pope County Detention Center in Russellville, Arkansas, where outraged farmers then picketed with their tractors. In response, Congress changed the relevant law. Cryts was acquitted of his contempt charges by a federal jury in June 1983.

== Later years ==
Cryts ran as the Democratic candidate for Missouri's 8th congressional district against Republican Bill Emerson in 1986 and 1988, but lost both times. The Cryts' farm fell into foreclosure in 1987, and the Cryts began to teach students the history of the grain elevator incident. Cryts and writer Jerry Hobbs co-wrote a memoir, published in 2005 with the title One Man with Courage: The Wayne Cryts Story.
