= Noxall, Missouri =

Unincorporated community in Missouri, U.S.

Coordinates: 36°43′21″N 89°34′40″W

Noxall is an unincorporated community in New Madrid County, in the U.S. state of Missouri.

The community is on Missouri Route HH approximately 3.5 miles north of Kewanee and 11 miles south of Sikeston. Combined U.S. routes 61 and 62 pass one mile to the east of the community. The St. Louis–San Francisco Railway passes adjacent to the location.

== History ==
A post office called Noxall was established in 1914, and remained in operation until 1922. The community was named after a type of flour.
