= Tallapoosa =

Tallapoosa may refer to:

== People ==
- Tallapoosas, a division of Upper Creek Indians in Alabama

== Places in the United States ==
- Tallapoosa, Georgia
- Tallapoosa, Missouri
- Tallapoosa County, Alabama
- Tallapoosa River, Alabama

== Ships ==
- USS Tallapoosa (1863)
- USCGC Tallapoosa (WPG-52)
