= Broadwater, Missouri =

Unincorporated community in Missouri, U.S.

Coordinates: 36°34′55″N 89°55′16″W

Broadwater is an unincorporated community in New Madrid County, in the U.S. state of Missouri.

== History ==
A post office called Broadwater was established in 1904, and remained in operation until 1917. The community was named for the Broadwater irrigation ditch.
