= Jack Kennedy (train robber) =

American train robber

John F. Kennedy (c. 1870 – November 3, 1922) was an American outlaw, described as "the West's last notorious train robber".

== Background ==
Kennedy, nicknamed "the Quail Hunter", was from Missouri. He had a record of seven train robberies within three years (1896–99), and served twelve years in the Missouri Penitentiary. He stood at liberty from 1912 until his death.

Several weeks prior to his last robbery, a railway inspector ran into Kennedy near Memphis and learned that he was making frequent short trips on the line from Memphis to points in northern Arkansas. The inspector became suspicious and notified a colleague. It was decided that the train to watch was the night train from St. Louis to Memphis, which frequently carried considerable amounts of money from the Federal Reserve Bank, sent south to move the cotton crop.

== Death and aftermath ==
Early on November 3, 1922, Kennedy and his companion Harvey Logan, a former railroad employee, stopped a southbound passenger train of the St. Louis-San Francisco Railway. The train, traveling from St. Louis to Memphis, was forced to halt at a station 7½ miles north of Wittenberg just outside the small community of Seventy-Six, Missouri. Logan cut the mail and express cars from the rest of the train. The engineer and fireman were ordered off the locomotive and Kennedy took the two cars down the track several miles. After stopping the locomotive, the two bandits entered the mail car. The three clerks were lined up against a wall. Kennedy inspected the mail, taking several pouches to the cab of the locomotive. The locomotive then was detached and Kennedy and Logan rode to Wittenberg. About 150 yards from the station, they jumped from the engine and left it running wild.

Their automobile was nearby, and concealed in the brush along the right of way were six postal inspectors, three railroad special agents and two deputy sheriffs. An inspector commanded them to halt. In the bright moonlight the officers saw Kennedy and Logan reach for their weapons. Several of them opened fire and the robbers fell dead, still clutching their revolvers.

The stolen mail, about 100 registered letters, was recovered.
