= Hartzell, Missouri =

Unincorporated community in Missouri, US

Coordinates: 36°29′07″N 89°51′21″W

Hartzell is an unincorporated community in New Madrid County, in the U.S. state of Missouri.

== History ==
A post office called Hartzell was established in 1918, and remained in operation until 1941. The community has the name of the local Hartzell family.
