= Farrenburg, Missouri =

Unincorporated community in Missouri, U.S.

Coordinates: 36°41′17″N 89°30′02″W

Farrenburg (also spelled Farrenberg) is an unincorporated community in New Madrid County, in the U.S. state of Missouri.

== History ==
Farrenburg was originally spelled "Farrenberg", and under the latter name was platted in 1882 when the railroad was extended to that point. The community has the name of W. A. Farrenberg, the original owner of the site. A post office called Farrenberg was established in 1897, and remained in operation until 1918.
