= Bismarck Conservation Area =

Protected land in Missouri, U.S.

- IUCN category IV (habitat/species management area)
- Location within Missouri
- Location: Iron, St. Francois, and Washington counties, Missouri, United States
- Nearest city: Bismarck, MO
- Coordinates: 37°43′25″N 90°38′49″W
- Area: 1,188 acres (4.8 km^{2})
- Established: 1981
- Governing body: Missouri Department of Conservation
- Website: Official website

Bismarck Conservation Area consists of 1,188 acres (4.81 km^{2}) southwest of Bismarck, Missouri. The area surrounds 210 acres (85 ha) DiSalvo Lake. The lake was constructed in 1944 by Hanna Mining Company, and the Missouri Department of Conservation acquired the land from Hanna Mining Company in 1981.

Bismarck Conservation Area includes a parking areas, boat ramp, two designated trails, and fishing dock. The area is open to hunting and fishing. It is the only conservation area in St. Francois County.

== Geography ==
The Bismarck Conservation Area contains a bottomland forest just northeast of Buford Mountain in the St. Francois Mountains. The nearest city to the park is Farmington which is located 10 mi (16 km) northeast.

=== Lake ===
DiSalvo Lake is the centerpiece of Bismarck conservation area; it impounds the headwaters of the St. Francois River. Its 210 acres was produced by a concrete dam built in the 1940s. The drainage ratio is 47:1. It is a very shallow lake with a maximum depth of 15 ft (4.6 m) and the upper third is only 4 ft (1.2 m) deep.

== Recreation ==
Bismarck Conservation Area offers many forms or recreational activities including: camping, cycling, equestrian, fishing, hiking, and hunting, but the predominant recreation in the park revolves around the Carl DiSalov Lake.

=== Hunting and Trapping ===
Permitted hunting is allowed conditioned upon Missouri state Law. Deer hunting is the most prominent variety of game available at Bismarck Conservation Area; portable tree stands, blinds, and decoys are all permitted in the area.

=== Fishing and Boating ===
Fishing at Bismarck Conservation Area is only allowed by pole and line. Smaller boats are permitted at no-wake speed. The main varieties of fish present include black bass, catfish, and crappie.
