= Conran, Missouri =

Unincorporated community in Missouri, US

Coordinates: 36°29′00″N 89°38′48″W

Conran is an unincorporated community in eastern New Madrid County, Missouri, United States. It is located approximately ten miles southwest of New Madrid on U.S. Route 61.

A post office called Conran was established in 1898, and remained in operation until 1992.
