= Como, Missouri =

Unincorporated community in Missouri, U.S.

Coordinates: 36°37′12″N 89°45′19″W

Como is an unincorporated community in New Madrid County, in the U.S. state of Missouri.

== History ==
Como was laid out in 1879 when the railroad was extended to that point. A post office called Como was established in 1879, and remained in operation until 1938. The community was named after Como, in Italy.
