= Boekerton, Missouri =

Unincorporated community in Missouri, U.S.

Coordinates: 36°24′14″N 89°45′43″W

Boekerton is an unincorporated community in New Madrid County, in the U.S. state of Missouri.

== History ==
A post office called Boekerton was established in 1905, and remained in operation until 1918. The community has the name of the local Boeker family.
