= Seventy-Six, Missouri =

Unincorporated community in Missouri, U.S.

- Abandoned village
- Location of Perry County, Missouri
- Coordinates: 37°43′12″N 89°36′44″W
- Country: United States
- State: Missouri
- County: Perry
- Township: Brazeau
- Elevation: 367 ft (112 m)
- Time zone: UTC-6 (Central (CST))
  - Summer (DST): UTC-5 (CDT)
- ZIP code: 63775
- Area code: 573
- FIPS code: 29-66782
- GNIS feature ID: 726217

Seventy-Six was an unincorporated community in Brazeau Township in eastern Perry County, Missouri, United States. It was located fourteen miles east of Perryville, ninety miles south of Saint Louis, and lay directly on the Mississippi River.

== Etymology ==
A number of theories abound to where the name Seventy-Six originates from. One theory tells of an 1844 flood where a steamboat captain who had been sent to the site to rescue the people reported that he had made 76 landings. Another theory concerns a steamboat captain who had quit swearing and had acquired the habit of exclaiming "That beats all 76," when he was vexed. He used the expression so often at that landing that the steamboat men had got into the habit of calling it Seventy-Six. Another possible explanation is that the landing is the 76th landing after leaving St. Louis. Yet another theory exists that the Government River Commission numbered the river landings and this was No. 76 from the head of the navigable waters. Another story explaining the origin of the name has it that the first captain to land his boat at the site was celebrating his 76th birthday.

According to steamboat captain John Wilkinson, who was to later found the town, the name of the community came from an unfortunate accident when he struck a snag and sank his vessel just outside the nearby landing in 1886, and since it happened to be the seventy-sixth landing on the voyage, the town was named for the catastrophe. Legend has it that Mr. Wilkinson printed a board on the opposite bank "76 LDG" from which the town took its name.

== History ==
The small community of Seventy-Six originated as a river landing for steamboats on the Mississippi River. John Wilkinson, an immigrant from Yorkshire, England, came to the US around 1816 when his parents immigrated to Philadelphia, Pennsylvania. He and his father invested in a riverboat called The Laurel and became involved in the shipping trade. The first trip from Louisville, Kentucky to Alton, Illinois went well. However, the return trip met with disaster when the ship sank a few miles from what would later be known as Seventy-Six, Missouri. Wading ashore after the accident, his only possession being the clothes he wore, he was said to have exclaimed: "Here is where I lost it and here is where I'll get it back."

A shanty was constructed from the wreckage of the Laurel and Wilkinson immediately became a dealer in cord wood, which was the only fuel used at that time to power river steamboats. His business started off by simply hauling wood using a hand sled in the winter and a wheelbarrow in the summer. Over time he used small boats to take wood by water, eventually acquiring oxen and wagon to move the wood. Eventually, Wilkinson became one of the largest landowners in the area. An island in the Mississippi - Wilkinson Island - was named after him; however, this island lies on the right side of the Mississippi River on the "Illinois" side.

The main economic activity in Seventy-Six was the riverboat landing and the sale of cord wood. The community was also home to two schools. "Union School" was attended by white children, while black children attended a separate school. The community also featured a general store "The G.S. Hatch Store", the Hatch Grain Company, fruit orchards, a stockyard, a saloon, a hotel, a post office (1880–1957), and a train depot. Eventually ownership of most of the land on which the community sat had passed to G.S. Hatch, who not only ran the general store, but also operated the boat landing, a large timber operation, owned an 800-acre tract of land including the fruit orchard, and had practically the whole population of Seventy-Six in his employ.

Seventy-Six was also home to Shiloh Evangelical-Lutheran Church which had been organized in 1857 by Jonathan Crimminger and was affiliated with the Evangelical-Lutheran Synod of Southern Illinois. Presbyterian church services were held on the second floor of the G.S. Hatch General Store and were conducted by Reverend James Valentine Worsham, who rode by horse from Old Appleton. Baptisms were held in a creek about a mile outside of Seventy-Six.

In 1903, the St. Louis–San Francisco Railway built a railroad along the river which made river traffic less lucrative. Trains stopped twice a day - 11:00 a.m. and 4:30 p.m. every day. The rail service also attracted the attention of Jack "Quail Hunter" Kennedy - the last of the Jesse James gang. In October, 1922, Jack Kennedy and his accomplices robbed the St. Louis-San Francisco train just outside Seventy-Six. The target of the train robbery were packages of money earmarked for a bank in Memphis, Tennessee. However, one of Kennedy's accomplices was an undercover Federal Marshall. The conductor, engineer and firemen on the train were aware of the planned robbery. Kennedy and one of his accomplices were shot dead during the attempted getaway.

Following numerous floods and a sharp decline in river transport, the community eventually disappeared. By 1940 the community had a population of only 35 people. In 1957 the post office closed. In the late 1950s what was left of the community depopulated. Today, forest and farmland cover the spot where Seventy-Six once stood.

== Conservation department ==
In 1990, the Missouri Department of Conservation incorporated the area into the Seventy-Six Conservation Area, which is used as a demonstration area for forest and wildlife management techniques. The conservation area also includes the Wilkinson Walking Trail.

== Geography ==
Seventy-Six was located along the Mississippi River at the end of Missouri Route D due west of "Mile 90". Although the Mississippi River forms the border between most of Missouri and Illinois, this particular section of the Mississippi is actually surrounded by Missouri on both sides. Wilkinson Island, which is shared by both Missouri and Illinois, lies on the east side of the Mississippi River.
