= Big Ridge, Nova Scotia =

Community in Canada

Coordinates: 45°56′59.6″N 60°13′00.1″W

Big Ridge in Nova Scotia

Big Ridge is a community in the Canadian province of Nova Scotia, located in the Cape Breton Regional Municipality on Cape Breton Island.
