= Tallapoosa, Missouri =

- City
- Location of Tallapoosa, Missouri
- Coordinates: 36°30′21″N 89°49′01″W
- Country: United States
- State: Missouri
- County: New Madrid

Area
  - Total: 0.45 sq mi (1.16 km^{2})
  - Land: 0.45 sq mi (1.16 km^{2})
  - Water: 0 sq mi (0.00 km^{2})
- Elevation: 272 ft (83 m)

Population (2020)
  - Total: 78
  - Density: 174.9/sq mi (67.52/km^{2})
- Time zone: UTC-6 (Central (CST))
  - Summer (DST): UTC-5 (CDT)
- ZIP code: 63878
- Area code: 573
- FIPS code: 29-72196
- GNIS feature ID: 2396026

Tallapoosa is a city in New Madrid County, Missouri, United States. The population was 78 at the 2020 census.

== History ==
Tallapoosa was laid out in 1902. The town was named after Tallapoosa County, Alabama. A post office called Tallapoosa has been in operation since 1915.

== Geography ==
Tallapoosa is located adjacent to Missouri Route 153 three miles south of Risco and eight miles southeast of Malden in adjacent Dunklin County. New Madrid is sixteen miles to the northeast.

According to the United States Census Bureau, the city has a total area of 0.45 square miles (1.17 km^{2}), all land.

== Demographics ==
Historical population
Census	Pop.	Note	%±
1930	154		—
1970	205		—
1980	197		−3.9%
1990	174		−11.7%
2000	204		17.2%
2010	168		−17.6%
2020	78		−53.6%
U.S. Decennial Census

=== 2020 census ===
At the 2020 census, there were 78 people, 46 households and 24 families living in the city. The racial makeup of the city was 87.2% white, and 9% from two or more races. Hispanic or Latino of any race were 3.8%.

There were 68 households, of which 33.3% had children under the age of 18 living with them, 50% were married couples living together, 20% had a female householder with no husband present, 26.7% had a male householder with no wife present, and 3.3% were non-families.

The median age was 45.4 years. The median household income was $58,500 and the poverty rate was 14.7%.

=== 2010 census ===
At the 2010 census, there were 168 people, 68 households and 45 families living in the city. The population density was 373.3 inhabitants per square mile (144.1/km^{2}). There were 77 housing units at an average density of 171.1 per square mile (66.1/km^{2}). The racial makeup of the city was 97.62% White, 1.79% Native American, and 0.60% from two or more races. Hispanic or Latino of any race were 2.38% of the population.

There were 68 households, of which 30.9% had children under the age of 18 living with them, 36.8% were married couples living together, 20.6% had a female householder with no husband present, 8.8% had a male householder with no wife present, and 33.8% were non-families. 32.4% of all households were made up of individuals, and 14.7% had someone living alone who was 65 years of age or older. The average household size was 2.47 and the average family size was 2.98.

The median age in the city was 39 years. 22% of residents were under the age of 18; 12.5% were between the ages of 18 and 24; 23.8% were from 25 to 44; 27.4% were from 45 to 64; and 14.3% were 65 years of age or older. The gender makeup of the city was 56.0% male and 44.0% female.

=== 2000 census ===
At the 2000 census, there were 204 people, 73 households and 54 families living in the city. The population density was 477.7 inhabitants per square mile (184.4/km^{2}). There were 88 housing units at an average density of 206.1 per square mile (79.6/km^{2}). The racial makeup of the city was 95.10% White, 1.47% Native American, and 3.43% from two or more races.

There were 73 households, of which 37.0% had children under the age of 18 living with them, 49.3% were married couples living together, 17.8% had a female householder with no husband present, and 24.7% were non-families. 19.2% of all households were made up of individuals, and 9.6% had someone living alone who was 65 years of age or older. The average household size was 2.79 and the average family size was 3.22.

32.4% of the population were under the age of 18, 9.3% from 18 to 24, 26.5% from 25 to 44, 18.1% from 45 to 64, and 13.7% who were 65 years of age or older. The median age was 31 years. For every 100 females, there were 129.2 males. For every 100 females age 18 and over, there were 94.4 males.

The median household income was $14,375 and the median family income was $15,000. Males had a median income of $11,875 compared with $15,000 for females. The per capita income for the city was $6,377. About 42.6% of families and 48.4% of the population were below the poverty line, including 50.9% of those under the age of eighteen and 18.2% of those 65 or over.

== Education ==
It is in the Gideon 37 School District.

Three Rivers College's service area includes New Madrid County.
