= Big Ridge, Missouri =

Unincorporated community in Missouri, U.S.

Coordinates: 36°43′39″N 89°39′46″W

Big Ridge is an unincorporated community in New Madrid County, in the U.S. state of Missouri.

The community has a historic church and once had a schoolhouse. A relatively tall ridge near the site accounts for the name.
