= Ristine, Missouri =

Unincorporated community in Missouri, US

Coordinates: 36°38′56″N 89°32′53″W

Ristine is an unincorporated community in New Madrid County, in the U.S. state of Missouri.

== History ==
Ristine was laid out in 1882, when the railroad was extended to that point. A post office called Ristine was established in 1888, and remained in operation until 1894. The community has the name of one Mr. Ristine, a railroad official.
