= Dodds, Missouri =

Unincorporated community in Missouri, U.S.

Coordinates: 36°36′07″N 89°40′26″W

Dodds is an unincorporated community in New Madrid County, in the U.S. state of Missouri.

The community is on Missouri Route D between Catron and Lilbourn. New Madrid lies 7.5 miles to the east. The St. Louis Southwestern Railway passes just north of the community.

== History ==
Variant names were Dodds Spur", "Sky" and "Warrington". The community has the name of E. M. Dodd, a railroad official. The local post office was called "Spurdod". The Spurdod post office opened and closed in 1918.
