= La Forge, Missouri =

Unincorporated community in Missouri, U.S.

Coordinates: 36°40′17″N 89°31′32″W

La Forge is an unincorporated community that is located in New Madrid County, in the U.S. state of Missouri.

== History ==
A post office called Laforge was established in 1883 and remained in operation until 1928. The community was named by prominent landowner A.B. Hunter in ode to his wife's maiden name, Laforge. Her family had settled in New Madrid in 1794 after being driven from France during the French Revolution.

Near La Forge is the La Plant Archeological Site, a prehistoric Native American site listed on the National Register of Historic Places.
