= Bayouville, Missouri =

Unincorporated community in Missouri, U.S.

Coordinates: 36°39′04″N 89°21′51″W

Bayouville is an unincorporated community in New Madrid County, in the U.S. state of Missouri.

== History ==
A post office called Bayouville was established in 1900, and remained in operation until 1930. The community was so named on account of bayous near the original town site.

Bayouville contains the St. Johns-Laplant IV Archeological District, a prehistoric Native American site listed on the National Register of Historic Places.
