= Seventy-Six Conservation Area, Perry County, Missouri =

Protected land in Missouri, U.S.

Seventy-Six Conservation Area
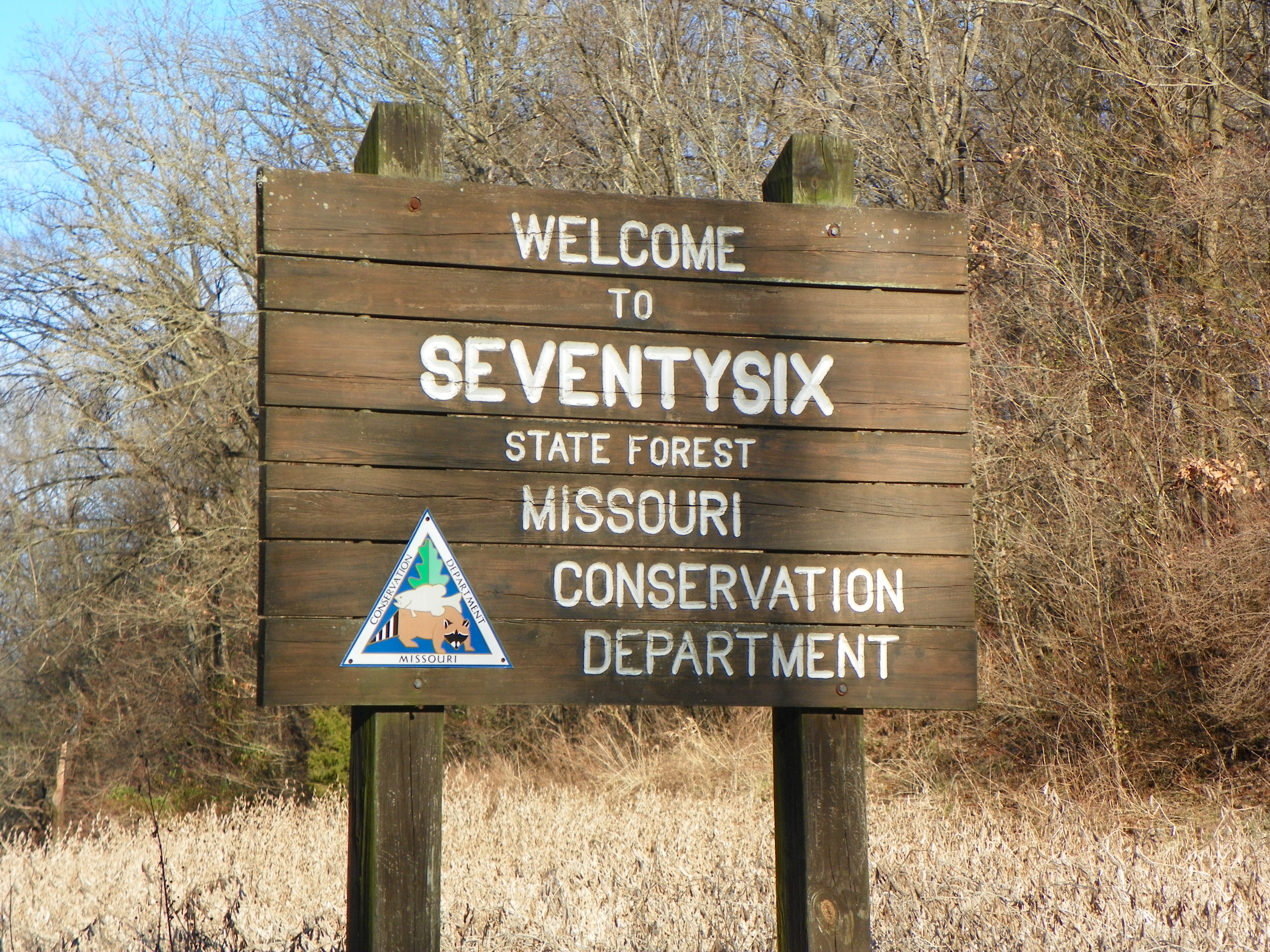
- Seventy-Six Converservation Area
- Interactive map of Seventy-Six Conservation Area
- Location: Missouri, United States
- Coordinates: 37°43′13.01″N 89°36′46.63″W
- Established: 1990

The Seventy-Six Conservation Area is located in eastern Perry County, Missouri at the end of Route D, approximately four miles northeast of Brazeau. The Missouri Conservation Department created this area in 1990 with the purchase of an 818-acre farm from a private landowner.

== History ==
The Mississippi River community of Seventy-Six was located on the present-site of the Seventy-Six Conservation Department. By the 1950s depopulation and flooding had reduced the community to a handful. Today, nothing remains of the former community.

== Conservation Area ==
The area contains steep forested hills, deep hollows and narrow ridge fields. In total, the conservation area consists of 746 acres. The forested track contains hardwood forest, including oaks, tulip poplars and other species, including a number of majestic old growth. The forest tract has several sinkholes and springs and offers scenic vistas overlooking the Mississippi River Valley. Steep rock bluffs run along the area for approximately two miles.

Seventy-Six Conservation Area is being used as a demonstration area for forest and wildlife management techniques, which produces forage and cover for many species of wildlife.

In addition, The Conservation Department has planted 50 acres of crop and food plots for wildlife, native warm-season grasses and legumes to provide additional food sources for wildlife. There is also another 200 acres of non-prairie grassland. A trail is available for visitors to view these forest and wildlife management practices.

The area boasts good populations of catfish, crappie, rough fish such as buffalo and carp, along with white bass and sauger. The Conservation Department is currently constructing a boat ramp at the Seventy-Six town site. When finished, it will be possible to launch a boat from Missouri, cross the river, and land in Missouri on the opposite shore.

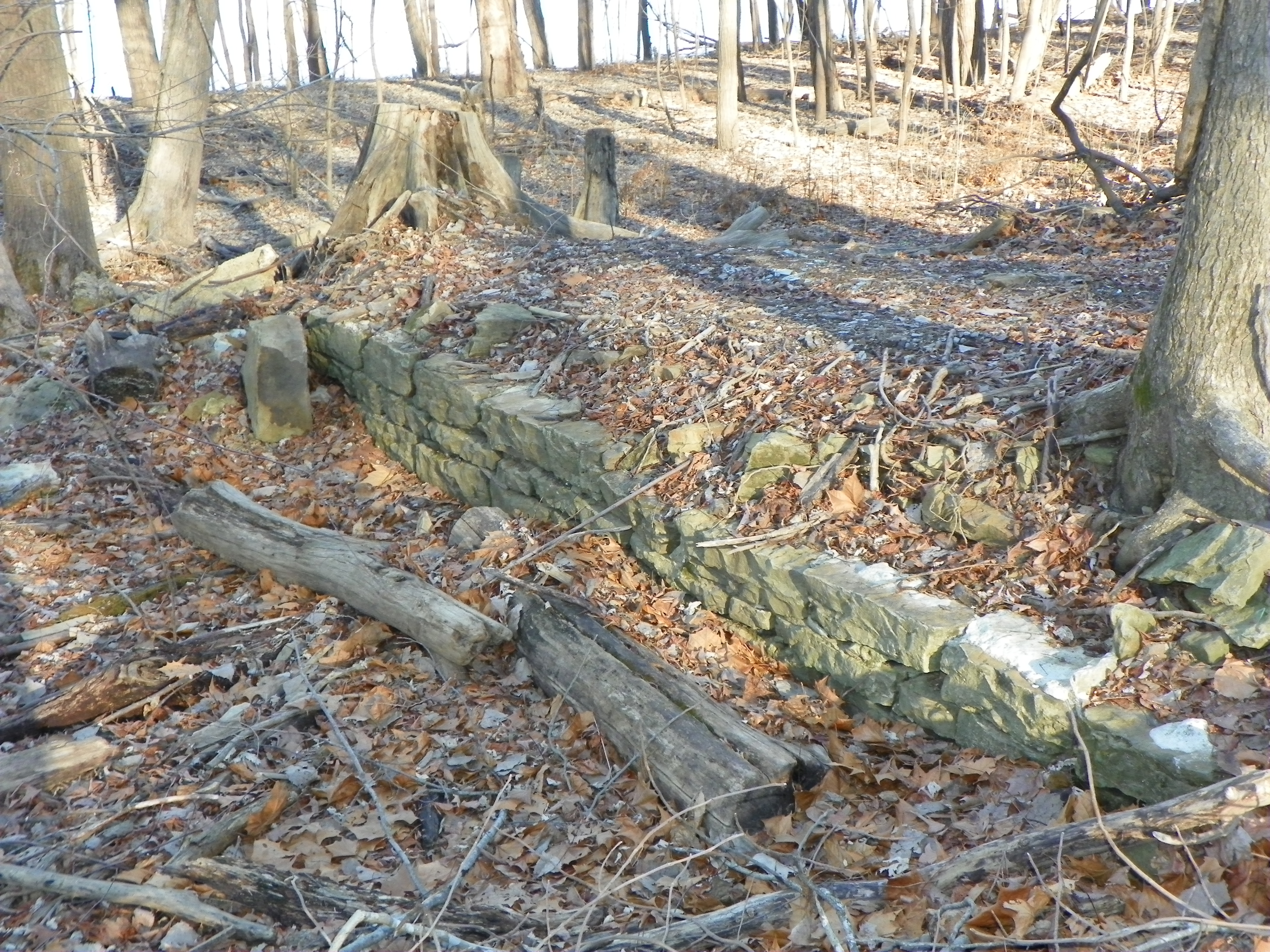
House Foundation of original town

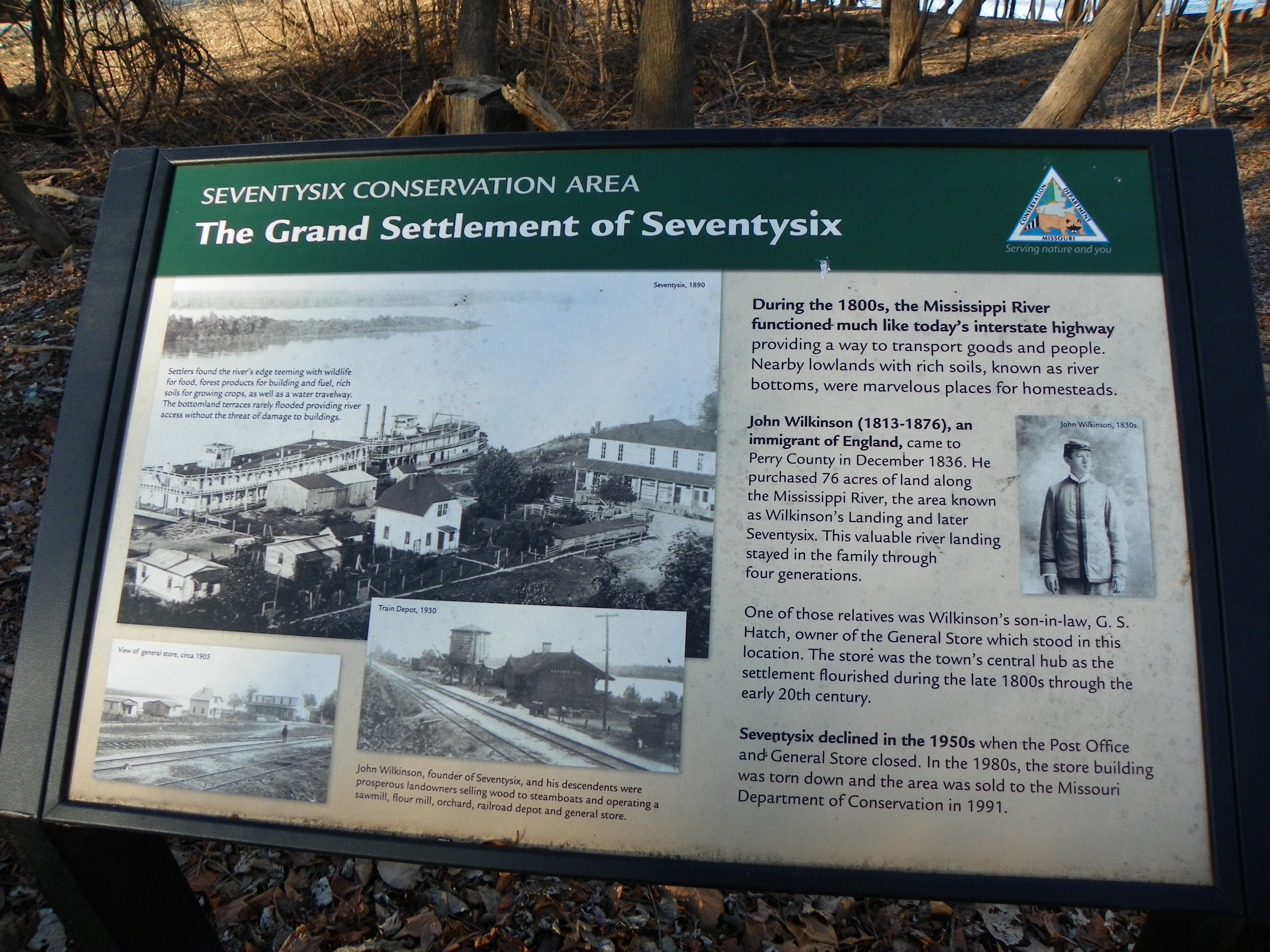
Information Plague

== See also ==
- Perry County, Missouri
