= Red Rock Landing Conservation Area, Perry County, Missouri =

Protected land in Missouri, U.S.

Red Rock Landing Conservation Area
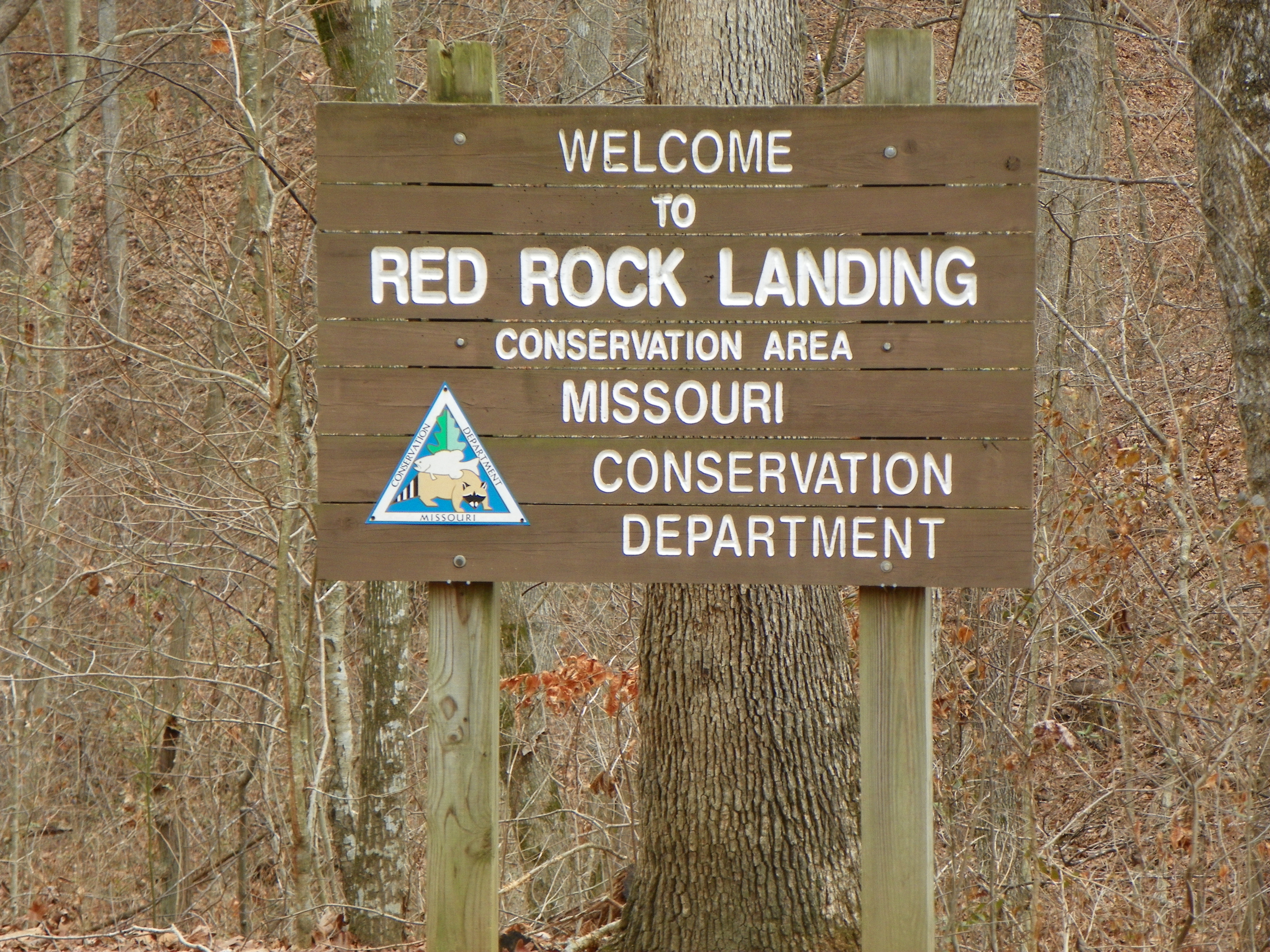
- Red Rock Landing Conservation Area
- Interactive map of Red Rock Landing Conservation Area
- Location: Missouri, United States
- Coordinates: 37°44′59.84″N 89°40′09.68″W
- Established: 1994

Red Rock Landing Conservation Area is a conservation area located in eastern Perry County, Missouri at the end of County Road 350, approximately ten miles east of Perryville, Missouri. The Missouri Conservation Department created this area in November 1994 with the purchase of 554-acres along the Mississippi River.

== Conservation Area ==
Red Rock Landing Conservation Area is on the Mississippi River in Perry County and consists of 554 acres and includes approximately one mile of Mississippi River frontage and one-half-mile of Cinque Hommes Creek frontage.

The conservation area contains seven ponds, totally about five acres. The area also contains 419 acres of timber, 60 acres of unprotected bottomland fields, and 70 acres of upland fields.

The Conservation Department purchased this property in November 1994 primarily for use as a public fishing access. The area has some of the best remaining riparian habitat in this reach of the Mississippi River. The frontage has good water depth and instream cover that provides excellent bank fishing for catfish, and other big river species.

The area forest is managed to improve tree growth, quality, and species composition. There is a camping area which has 3 defined campsites with fire rings, picnic tables, BBQ grills, and gravel pads, as well as hiking trails.

Due to changeable river levels, the conservation area is inaccessible by road when the Mississippi River level is over 20 feet on the Chester Power gauge.

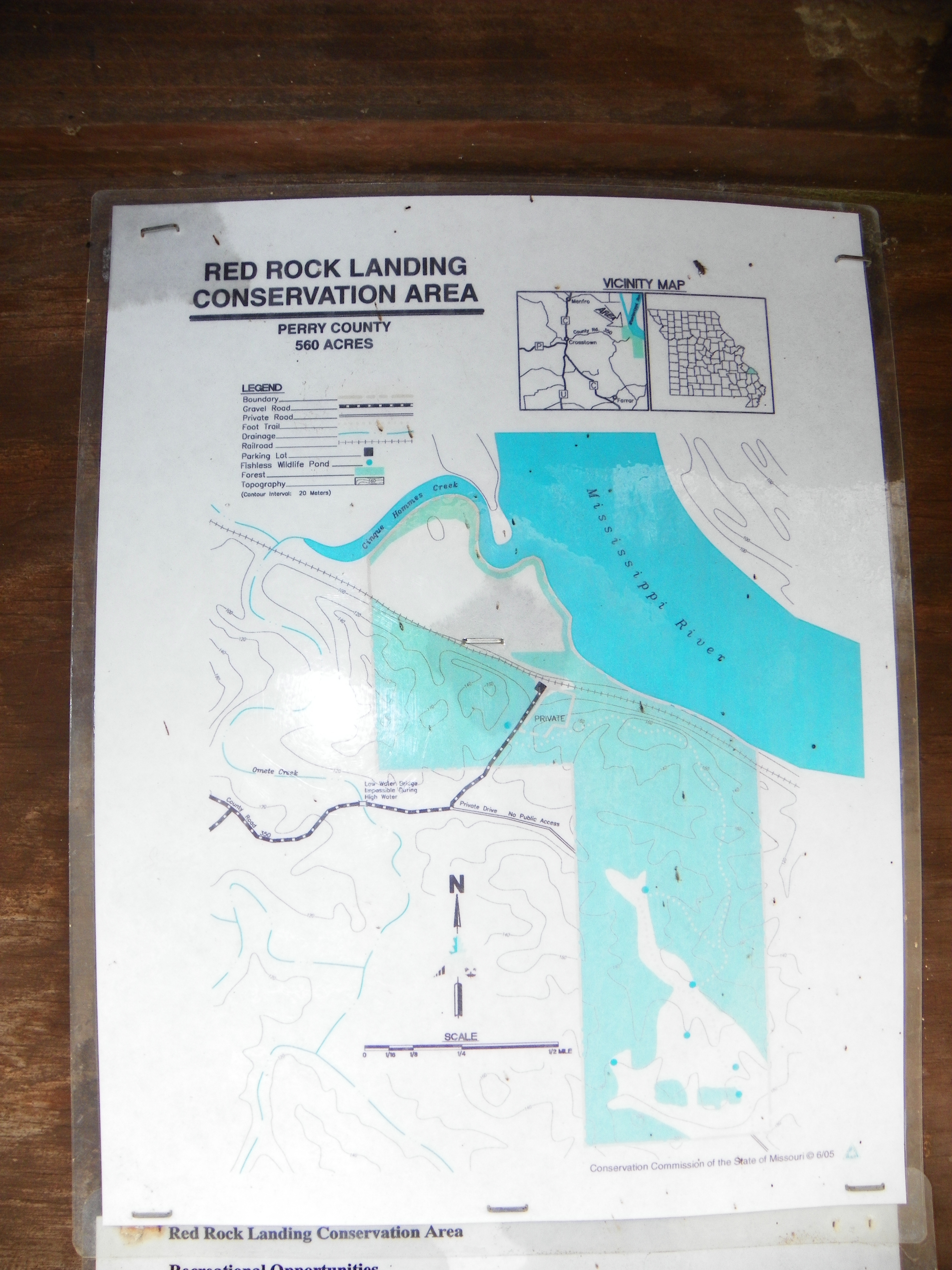
Site map

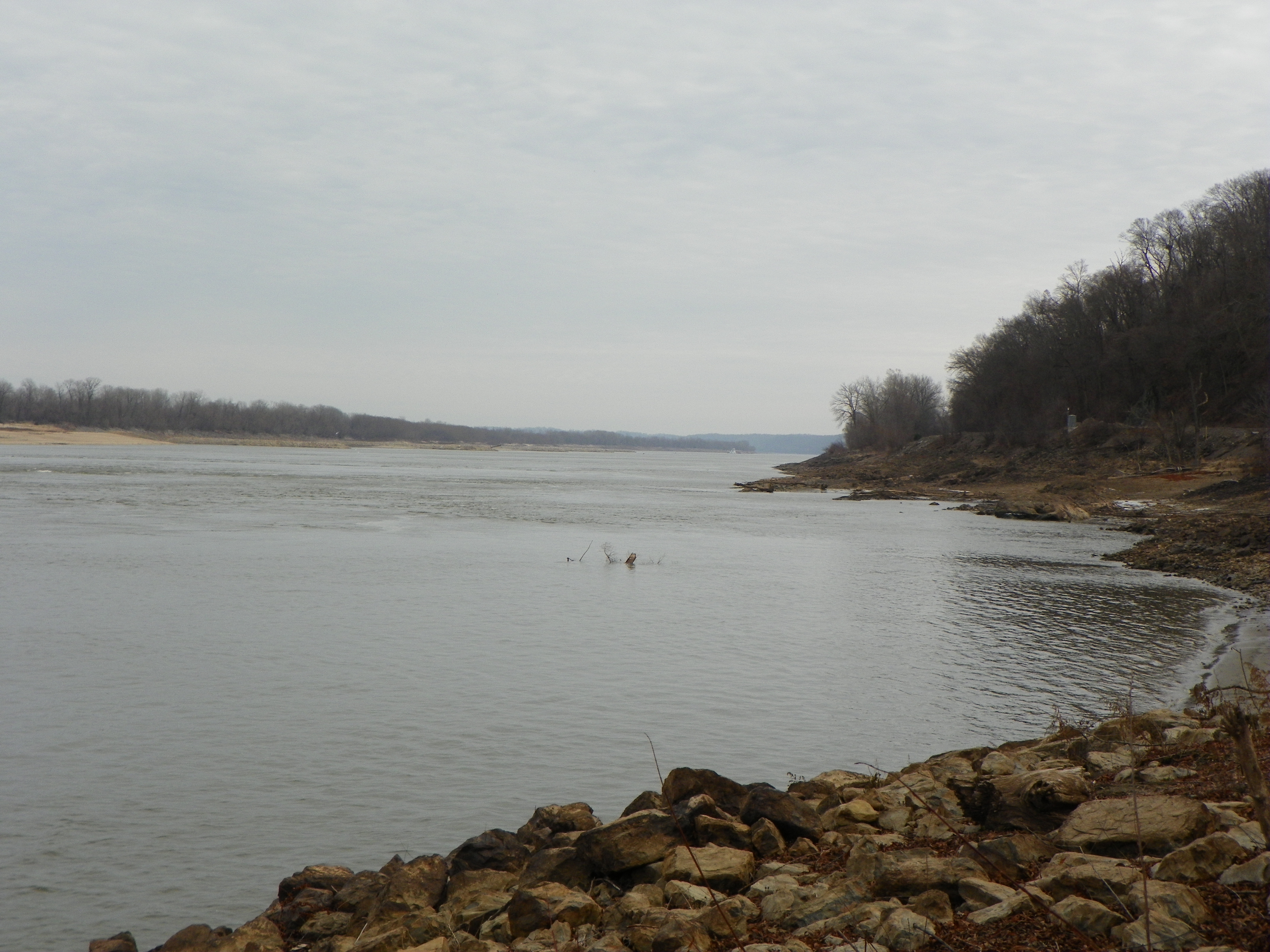
View of the Mississippi River

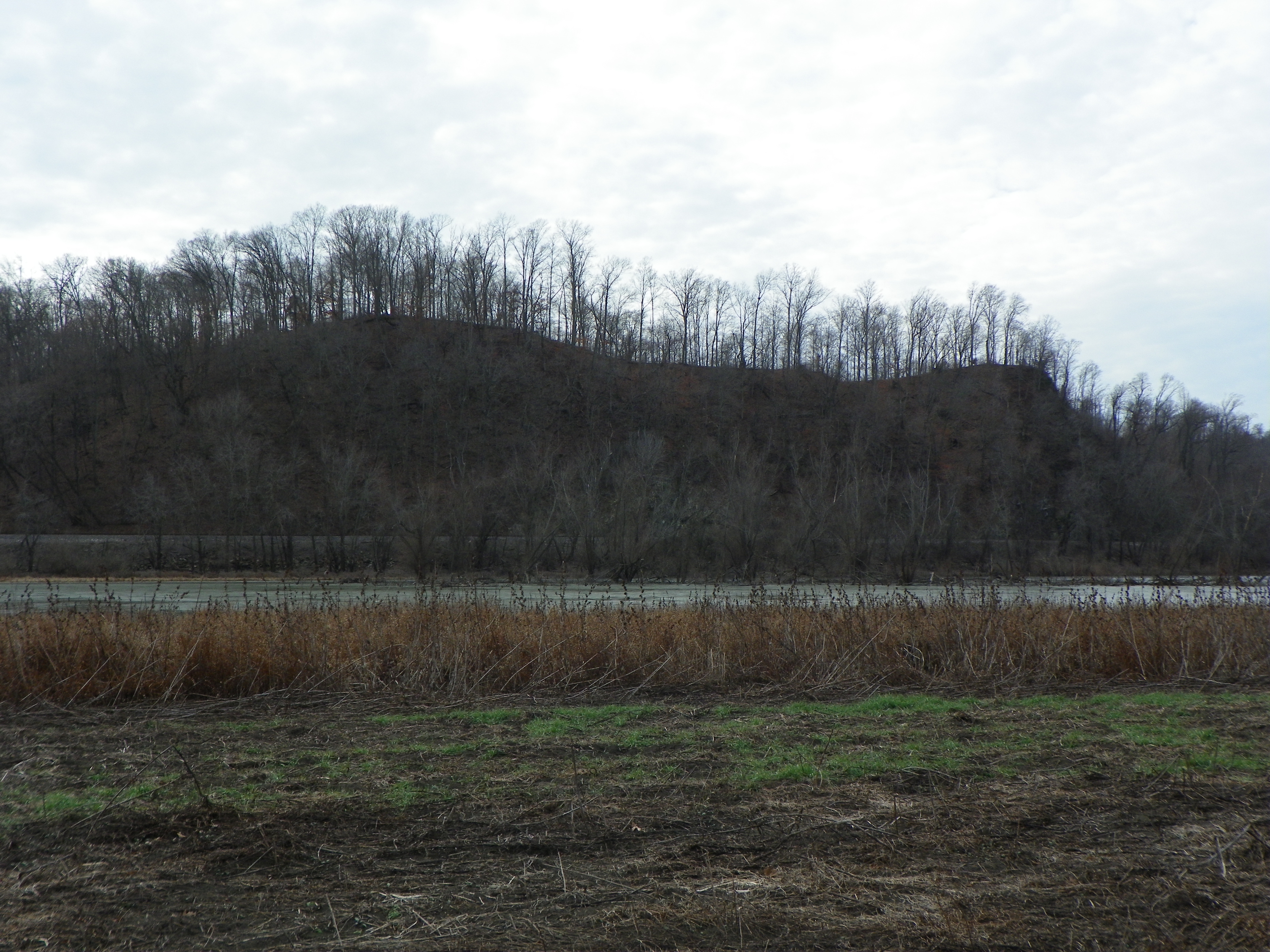
Field and bluffs

== See also ==
- Perry County, Missouri
