= Kewanee, Missouri =

Unincorporated community in Missouri, U.S.

Coordinates: 36°40′16″N 89°34′26″W

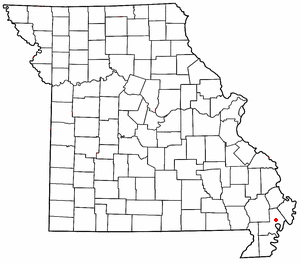

Kewanee is an unincorporated community in New Madrid County, Missouri, United States. It is located approximately five miles north of New Madrid, and about one mile west of U.S. Routes 61/62.

Kewanee got its start in 1910 as a lumber company town. The community was named after Kewanee, Illinois, the native home of a lumber official. A post office called Kewanee has been in operation since 1907.
