= Portageville, Missouri =

- City
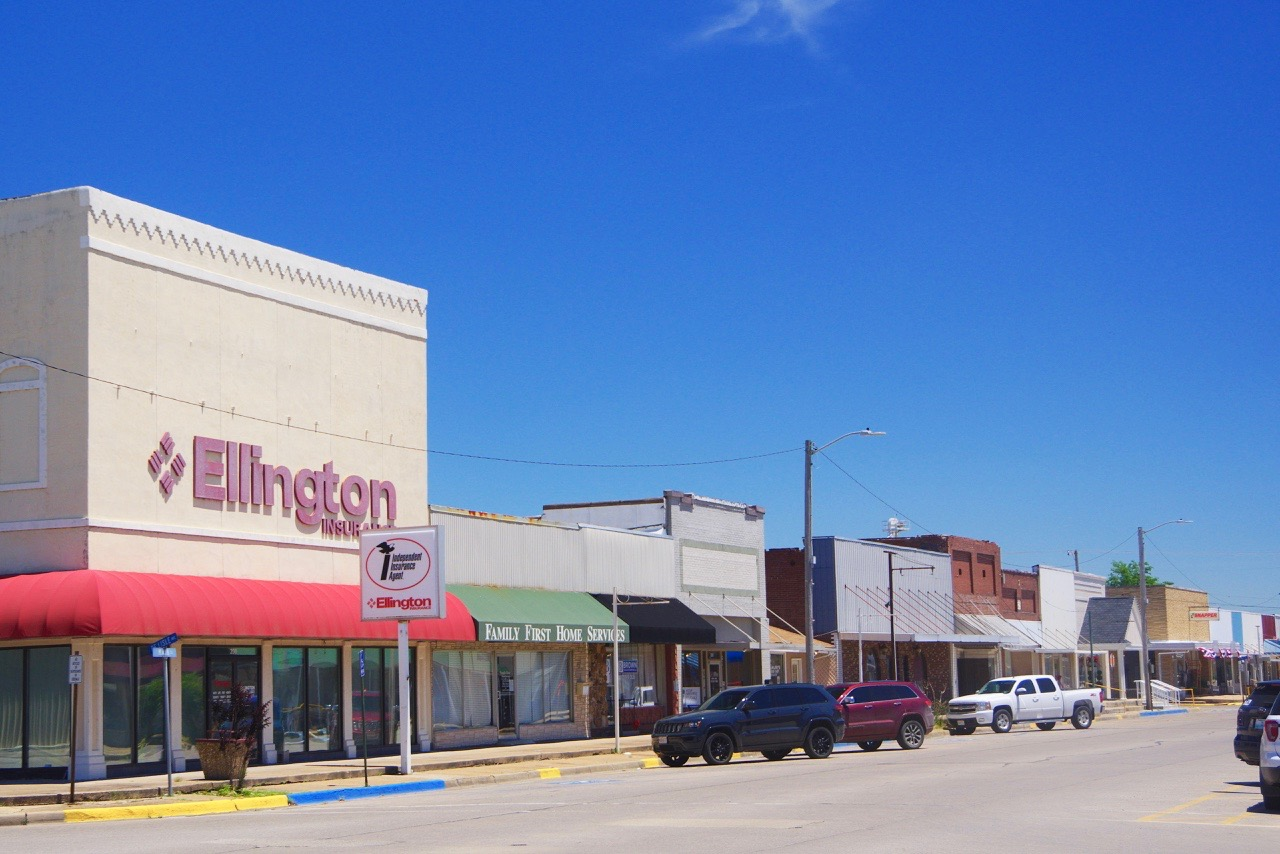
- Main Street

- Location of Portageville, Missouri
- Coordinates: 36°25′46″N 89°41′58″W
- Country: United States
- State: Missouri
- Counties: New Madrid, Pemiscot

Government
  - Type: Mayor/council system
  - Mayor: Mike Cook Jr.
  - Aldermen: Gary Faulk, Denis McCrate, Kris Simmons, Rob Smith

Area
  - Total: 2.04 sq mi (5.28 km^{2})
  - Land: 2.04 sq mi (5.28 km^{2})
  - Water: 0 sq mi (0.00 km^{2})
- Elevation: 282 ft (86 m)

Population (2020)
  - Total: 2,942
  - Density: 1,441.9/sq mi (556.73/km^{2})
- Time zone: UTC-6 (Central (CST))
  - Summer (DST): UTC-5 (CDT)
- ZIP code: 63873
- Area code: 573
- FIPS code: 29-59186
- GNIS feature ID: 2396256

Portageville is a city located within New Madrid and Pemiscot counties in the U.S. state of Missouri. The population was 2,942 at the time of the 2020 census.

== History ==
A post office has been in operation in Portageville since 1873. The city's name comes from the nearby Portage Bayou.

From 1935 to 1936, Portageville was the home of the Portageville Pirates, who were part of the Kitty League. According to one source, "In 1935, the Portageville Pirates are awarded the second-half title after the Jackson Generals and Union City Greyhounds are disqualified for having too many class players on their rosters." In 1936, the Pirates relocated to Owensboro, Kentucky.

== Geography ==
Portageville is primarily located in New Madrid County. It is situated along U.S. Route 61 and Missouri Route 162, which briefly merge as they pass through the city. Interstate 55 runs through the eastern part of Portageville, which is located approximately 5 miles (8.0 km) west of the Mississippi River.

According to the United States Census Bureau, the city has a total area of 2.04 square miles (5.28 km^{2}), all of which is land.

=== Climate ===
The climate of Portageville is characterized by hot, humid summers and generally mild to cool winters. According to the Köppen climate classification system, Portageville has a humid subtropical climate (Cfa).

Climate data for Portageville, Missouri
Month	Jan	Feb	Mar	Apr	May	Jun	Jul	Aug	Sep	Oct	Nov	Dec	Year
Mean daily maximum °C (°F)	6 (42)	8 (47)	14 (58)	21 (69)	26 (78)	31 (87)	32 (90)	31 (88)	27 (81)	22 (71)	14 (58)	8 (46)	20 (68)
Mean daily minimum °C (°F)	−3 (27)	−1 (30)	4 (39)	9 (49)	14 (58)	19 (67)	21 (70)	20 (68)	16 (60)	9 (48)	4 (40)	−1 (30)	9 (49)
Average precipitation mm (inches)	86 (3.4)	84 (3.3)	110 (4.3)	130 (5)	130 (5)	99 (3.9)	94 (3.7)	69 (2.7)	91 (3.6)	91 (3.6)	110 (4.2)	110 (4.4)	1,200 (47.2)
Source: Weatherbase

== Demographics ==
Historical population
Census	Pop.	Note	%±
1880	73		—
1900	427		—
1910	987		131.1%
1920	1,244		26.0%
1930	1,262		1.4%
1940	2,107		67.0%
1950	2,662		26.3%
1960	2,505		−5.9%
1970	3,117		24.4%
1980	3,470		11.3%
1990	3,401		−2.0%
2000	3,295		−3.1%
2010	3,228		−2.0%
2020	2,942		−8.9%

=== 2020 census ===
As of the 2020 census, Portageville had a population of 2,942. The median age was 40.9 years. 25.6% of residents were under the age of 18 and 18.6% of residents were 65 years of age or older. For every 100 females there were 87.0 males, and for every 100 females age 18 and over there were 81.7 males age 18 and over.

0.0% of residents lived in urban areas, while 100.0% lived in rural areas.

There were 1,249 households in Portageville, of which 32.1% had children under the age of 18 living in them. Of all households, 39.8% were married-couple households, 17.2% were households with a male householder and no spouse or partner present, and 35.9% were households with a female householder and no spouse or partner present. About 33.5% of all households were made up of individuals and 13.1% had someone living alone who was 65 years of age or older.

There were 1,417 housing units, of which 11.9% were vacant. The homeowner vacancy rate was 1.3% and the rental vacancy rate was 8.6%.

Racial composition as of the 2020 census
Race	Number	Percent
White	2,271	77.2%
Black or African American	493	16.8%
American Indian and Alaska Native	0	0.0%
Asian	5	0.2%
Native Hawaiian and Other Pacific Islander	0	0.0%
Some other race	15	0.5%
Two or more races	158	5.4%
Hispanic or Latino (of any race)	33	1.1%

=== 2010 census ===
As of the census of 2010, there were 3,228 people, 1,346 households, and 894 families residing in the city. The population density was 1,582.4 inhabitants per square mile (611.0/km^{2}). There were 1,409 housing units, with an average density of 690.7 per square mile (266.7/km^{2}). The racial makeup of the city was 78.62% White, 18.96% Black or African American, 0.06% Native American, 0.19% Asian, 0.19% from other races, and 1.98% from two or more races. Hispanic or Latino of any race constituted 0.87% of the population.

Out of the 1,346 households, 34.0% had children under the age of 18 living with them, 43.6% were married couples living together, 17.5% had a female householder with no husband present, 5.3% had a male householder with no wife present, and 33.6% were non-families. 29.8% of all households were made up of individuals, and 14.2% had someone living alone who was 65 years of age or older. The average household size was 2.37, and the average family size was 2.92.

The median age in the city was 38.6 years. 25.7% of residents were under the age of 18; 7.9% were between the ages of 18 and 24; 24% were from 25 to 44; 26% were from 45 to 64; and 16.4% were 65 years of age or older. The gender makeup of the city was 46.4% male and 53.6% female.

=== 2000 census ===
According to the census of 2000, there were 3,295 people, 1,335 households, and 890 families residing in the city. The population density was 1,643.5 inhabitants per square mile (634.6/km^{2}). There were 1,404 housing units, with an average density of 700.3 per square mile (270.4/km^{2}). The racial makeup of the city was 82.00% White, 16.36% African American, 0.18% Native American, 0.30% Asian, 0.27% from other races, and 0.88% from two or more races. Hispanic or Latino of any race constituted 0.82% of the population.

Out of the 1,335 households, 33.3% had children under the age of 18 living with them, 46.4% were married couples living together, 17.3% had a female householder with no husband present, and 33.3% were non-families. 29.6% of all households were made up of individuals, and 15.1% had someone living alone who was 65 years of age or older. The average household size was 2.43, and the average family size was 3.02.

In the city, the population was spread out, with 27.3% under the age of 18, 9.3% from 18 to 24, 26.4% from 25 to 44, 20.9% from 45 to 64, and 16.2% who were 65 years of age or older. The median age was 37 years. For every 100 females, there were 84.6 males. For every 100 females age 18 and over, there were 77.4 males.

The median income for a household in the city was $26,729, and the median income for a family was $35,913. Males had a median income of $31,325 versus $20,735 for females. The per capita income for the city was $15,114. About 21.4% of families and 27.0% of the population were below the poverty line, including 37.8% of those under age 18 and 25.1% of those age 65 or over.

== Education ==
The portion in New Madrid County is in the Portageville School District. The Portageville School District operates one elementary school, one middle school, and Portageville High School. There is also a Catholic School, St. Eustachius, for grades K-8.

The portion in Pemiscot County is in the North Pemiscot County R-I School District.

Portageville has a lending library, which is a branch of the New Madrid County Library.

Three Rivers College's service area includes both New Madrid and Pemiscot counties.

== Notable people ==
- Luis Morgan Casey, a Roman Catholic bishop, was born in Portageville.
- Vermel Whalen, an Ohio state legislator, was born in Portageville.

== See also ==
- List of Portageville mayors
- KMIS (AM): a sports station licensed to Portageville
