= New Madrid County, Missouri =

County in Missouri, United States

- County
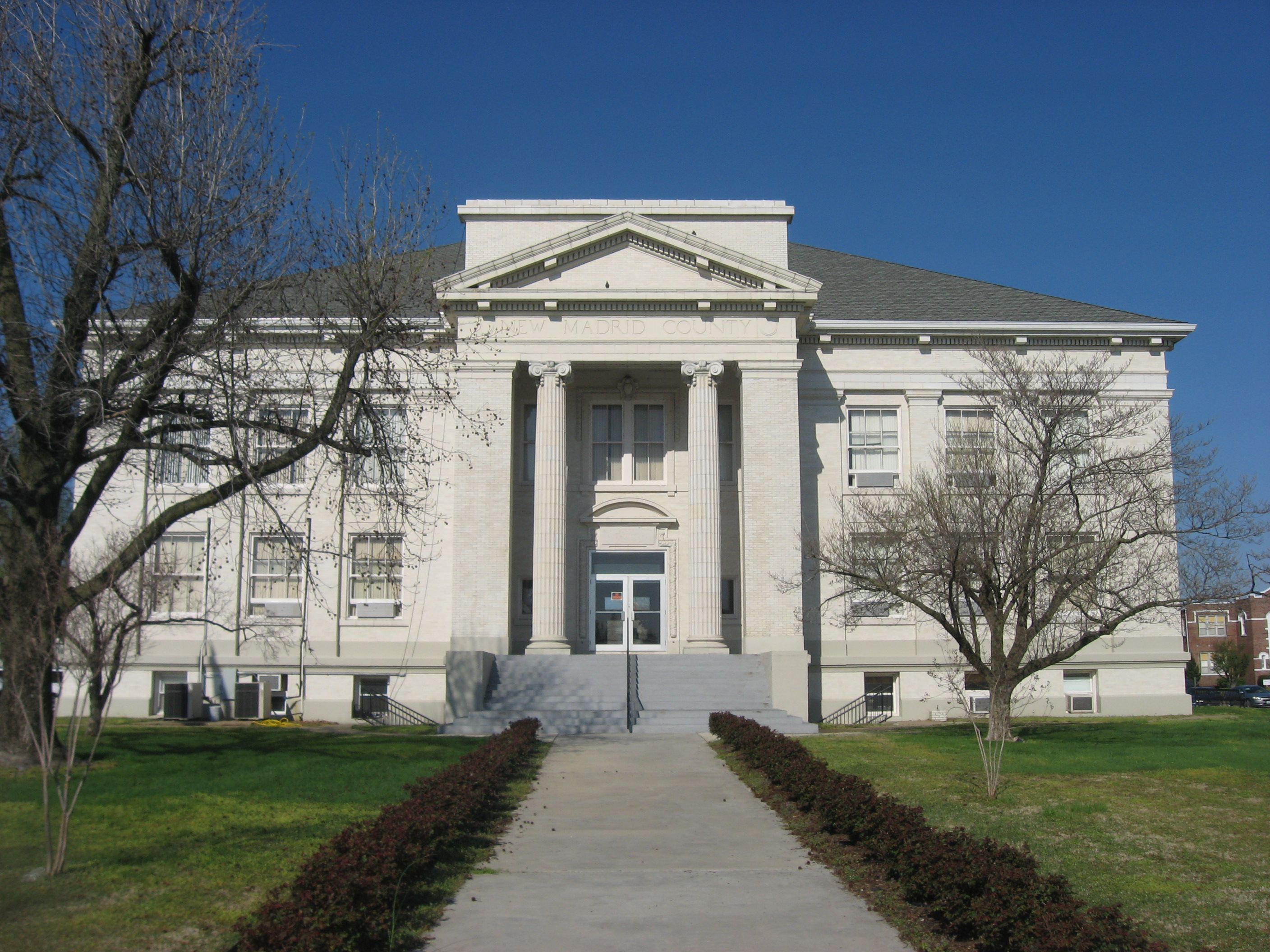
- New Madrid County Courthouse

- Location within the U.S. state of Missouri
- Coordinates: 36°35′N 89°40′W
- Country: United States
- State: Missouri
- Founded: October 1, 1812
- Named for: Madrid, Spain
- Seat: New Madrid
- Largest city: Portageville

Area
  - Total: 697 sq mi (1,810 km^{2})
  - Land: 675 sq mi (1,750 km^{2})
  - Water: 22 sq mi (57 km^{2}) 3.1%

Population (2020)
  - Estimate (2025): 15,086 ▼
- Time zone: UTC−6 (Central)
  - Summer (DST): UTC−5 (CDT)
- Congressional district: 8th

New Madrid County (/ˈmædrɪd/ MAD-rid; Spanish: Condado de Nueva Madrid; French: Comté de New Madrid) is a county located in the Bootheel of the U.S. state of Missouri. As of the 2020 census, the population was 16,434. The largest city is Portageville and county seat is New Madrid, located on the northern side of the Kentucky Bend in the Mississippi River, where it has formed an oxbow around an exclave of Fulton County, Kentucky. This feature has also been known as New Madrid Bend or Madrid Bend, for the city.

The county was officially organized on October 1, 1812, encompassing most of present-day Arkansas. Named after Nuevo Madrid, a district located in the region, the area was under Spanish rule following France's cession of Louisiana after being defeated in the Seven Years' War. The Spanish named the district after Madrid, the capital of Spain.

The county includes a large part of the New Madrid fault that produced the 1811–12 New Madrid earthquakes. This zone remains geologically active, and had continued to produce smaller earthquakes with some frequency.

== History ==
French Canadians from New France landed in this area in 1781 and established the first European settlement in the present county at New Madrid along the Mississippi River. France had ceded this area to Spain following its loss in the Seven Years' War. The Spanish governor, Bernardo de Gálvez, appointed American colonel William Morgan, a Revolutionary War veteran from New Jersey, as empresario to recruit new settlers for the area. Morgan attracted about 2,000 settlers before Spain returned this territory to France in the late 18th century. They settled mostly in the area of what is now the city of New Madrid, Missouri. After failing to regain control of its colony of Saint-Domingue, where a slave rebellion had been raging, France gave up on North America, selling its large territory west of the Mississippi River in 1803 to the United States under the Louisiana Purchase.

New Madrid County was organized on October 1, 1812, as an act of the First General Assembly of the Missouri Territory. In the floodplain of the Mississippi, this area was long cultivated by planters using enslaved African Americans for cotton production.

A series of more than 1,000 earthquakes struck the area in 1811 and 1812. The New Madrid earthquakes were the strongest non-subduction zone earthquake in the United States. A request dated January 13, 1814, by the Territorial Governor William Clark, asked for federal relief for the "inhabitants of New Madrid County."

The county had its peak of population in 1940, according to US census records, as shown in the table. Many residents left the rural county from 1950 to 1970, seeking better work opportunities in the North and Midwest. County population has continued to decline. In 2017 the county was featured in an episode of Madrid de sol a sol, a show from Spanish public channel Telemadrid exploring locations named "Madrid".

== Geography ==
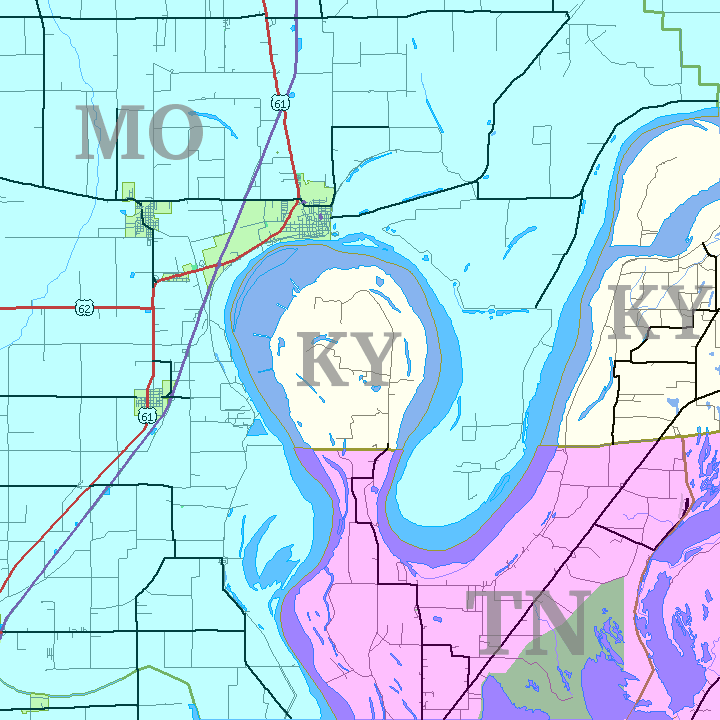
Kentucky Bend and surrounding area Missouri (MO) Tennessee (TN) Kentucky (KY)

According to the U.S. Census Bureau, the county has a total area of 697 square miles (1,810 km^{2}), of which 675 square miles (1,750 km^{2}) is land and 22 square miles (57 km^{2}) (3.1%) is water.

The county is located on the Kentucky Bend of the Mississippi River, which forms a border of the county. This feature is also known as New Madrid Bend or Madrid Bend. This oxbow flows around an exclave of Fulton County, Kentucky. Scientists expect that eventually the river will cut a new channel across the narrow neck of the peninsula, which will gradually be attached by infill land to Missouri.

Unlike most of Missouri, southern parts of New Madrid County are within the Sun Belt, defined by the Kinder Institute as being south of 36°30'N latitude.

=== Adjacent counties ===
- Scott County (north)
- Mississippi County (northeast)
- Fulton County, Kentucky (south and east across the Mississippi river)
- Lake County, Tennessee (south across the river)
- Pemiscot County (south)
- Dunklin County (southwest)
- Stoddard County (northwest)

=== Major highways ===
- Interstate 55
- Future Interstate 57
- U.S. Route 60
- U.S. Route 61
- U.S. Route 62
- Route 153
- Route 162

== Demographics ==
Historical population
Census	Pop.	Note	%±
1820	2,296		—
1830	2,350		2.4%
1840	4,554		93.8%
1850	5,541		21.7%
1860	5,654		2.0%
1870	6,357		12.4%
1880	7,694		21.0%
1890	9,317		21.1%
1900	11,280		21.1%
1910	19,488		72.8%
1920	25,180		29.2%
1930	30,262		20.2%
1940	39,787		31.5%
1950	39,444		−0.9%
1960	31,350		−20.5%
1970	23,420		−25.3%
1980	22,945		−2.0%
1990	20,928		−8.8%
2000	19,760		−5.6%
2010	18,956		−4.1%
2020	16,434		−13.3%
2025 (est.)	15,086	▼	−8.2%
U.S. Decennial Census; 1790-1960 1900-1990; 1990-2000 2010-2015

=== 2020 census ===
As of the 2020 census, the county had a population of 16,434. The median age was 42.6 years, 23.7% of residents were under the age of 18, and 20.0% of residents were 65 years of age or older. For every 100 females there were 92.8 males, and for every 100 females age 18 and over there were 89.1 males age 18 and over.

12.6% of residents lived in urban areas, while 87.4% lived in rural areas.

There were 6,917 households in the county, of which 29.4% had children under the age of 18 living with them and 31.7% had a female householder with no spouse or partner present. About 31.6% of all households were made up of individuals and 14.5% had someone living alone who was 65 years of age or older.

There were 7,870 housing units, of which 12.1% were vacant. Among occupied housing units, 63.6% were owner-occupied and 36.4% were renter-occupied. The homeowner vacancy rate was 2.2% and the rental vacancy rate was 9.8%.

=== 2000 census ===
As of the census of 2000, there were 19,760 people, 7,824 households, and 5,508 families residing in the county. The population density was 29 people per square mile (11 people/km^{2}). There were 8,600 housing units at an average density of 13 units per square mile (5.0/km^{2}). The racial makeup of the county was 83.21% White, 15.36% Black or African American, 0.19% Native American, 0.14% Asian, 0.01% Pacific Islander, 0.32% from other races, and 0.78% from two or more races. Approximately 0.93% of the population were Hispanic or Latino of any race. Among the major first ancestries reported in New Madrid County were 32.4% American, 10.3% Irish, 8.8% English, and 8.7% German ancestry.

There were 7,824 households, out of which 32.80% had children under the age of 18 living with them, 52.00% were married couples living together, 14.60% had a female householder with no husband present, and 29.60% were non-families. 26.50% of all households were made up of individuals, and 13.20% had someone living alone who was 65 years of age or older. The average household size was 2.48 and the average family size was 2.99.

In the county, the population was spread out, with 26.40% under the age of 18, 8.50% from 18 to 24, 26.40% from 25 to 44, 23.20% from 45 to 64, and 15.50% who were 65 years of age or older. The median age was 37 years. For every 100 females there were 92.40 males. For every 100 females age 18 and over, there were 86.50 males.

The median income for a household in the county was $32,758, and the median income for a family was $39,411. Males had a median income of $28,408 versus $19,186 for females. The per capita income for the county was $17,227. About 18.60% of families and 22.10% of the population were below the poverty line, including 31.40% of those under age 18 and 19.20% of those age 65 or over.

=== Racial and ethnic composition ===
The racial and ethnic composition as reported in the 2020 redistricting data is shown in the table below.

New Madrid County, Missouri – Racial and ethnic composition Note: the US Census treats Hispanic/Latino as an ethnic category. This table excludes Latinos from the racial categories and assigns them to a separate category. Hispanics/Latinos may be of any race.
Race / Ethnicity (NH = Non-Hispanic)	Pop 1980	Pop 1990	Pop 2000	Pop 2010	Pop 2020	% 1980	% 1990	% 2000	% 2010	% 2020
White alone (NH)	19,183	17,497	16,345	15,380	12,610	83.60%	83.61%	82.72%	81.14%	76.73%
Black or African American alone (NH)	3,549	3,267	3,024	2,983	2,731	15.47%	15.61%	15.30%	15.74%	16.62%
Native American or Alaska Native alone (NH)	19	34	33	40	25	0.08%	0.16%	0.17%	0.21%	0.15%
Asian alone (NH)	32	36	26	75	62	0.14%	0.17%	0.13%	0.40%	0.38%
Native Hawaiian or Pacific Islander alone (NH)	x	x	1	7	1	x	x	0.01%	0.04%	0.01%
Other race alone (NH)	12	1	5	8	27	0.05%	0.00%	0.03%	0.04%	0.16%
Mixed race or Multiracial (NH)	x	x	143	249	725	x	x	0.72%	1.31%	4.41%
Hispanic or Latino (any race)	150	93	183	214	253	0.65%	0.44%	0.93%	1.13%	1.54%
Total	22,945	20,928	19,760	18,956	16,434	100.00%	100.00%	100.00%	100.00%	100.00%

== Religion ==
According to the Association of Religion Data Archives County Membership Report (2000), New Madrid County is a part of the Bible Belt as evangelical Protestantism is the majority religion. The most predominant denominations among residents in New Madrid County who adhere to a religion are Southern Baptists (62.86%), Roman Catholics (8.80%), and Methodists (7.36%).

== Education ==
Of adults 25 years of age and older in New Madrid County, 63.6% possess a high school diploma or higher while 9.6% hold a bachelor's degree or higher as their highest educational attainment.

School districts including sections of the county, no matter how slight, even if the relevant schools and/or administration buildings in another county:

- East Prairie R-II School District
- Gideon 37 School District
- New Madrid County R-I School District
- Portageville School District
- Risco R-II School District
- Sikeston School District

=== Public schools ===
- Gideon School District 37 - Gideon
  - Gideon Elementary School (K-6)
  - Gideon High School (7-12)
- New Madrid County R-I School District - New Madrid
  - Lilbourn Elementary School (PK-5) - Lilbourn
  - Matthews Elementary School (PK-5) - Matthews
  - New Madrid County Central Elementary School (PK-5)
  - New Madrid County Central Middle School (6-08)
  - New Madrid County Central High School (9-12)
- Portageville School District - Portageville
  - Portageville Elementary School (PK-5)
  - Portageville Middle School (6-8)
  - Portageville High School (9-12)
- Risco R-II School District - Risco
  - Risco Elementary School (K-6)
  - Risco High School (7-12)

=== Private schools ===
- St. Eustachius Elementary School - Portageville - (PK-8) - Roman Catholic
- Immaculate Conception School - New Madrid - (PK-8) - Roman Catholic

=== Alternative/vocational schools ===
- New Madrid Bend Youth Center - New Madrid - (6-12) - Alternative
- New Madrid R-I Technical Skills Center - New Madrid - (9-12) - Vocational/Technical

=== Public libraries ===
- Lilbourn Memorial Library
- New Madrid County Library

=== Colleges and universities ===
Three Rivers College's service area includes New Madrid County.

== Communities ==
=== Cities and Towns ===
- Canalou
- Catron
- Gideon
- Howardville
- Lilbourn
- Marston
- Matthews
- Morehouse
- New Madrid (county seat)
- North Lilbourn
- Parma
- Portageville (partly in Pemiscot County)
- Risco
- Sikeston (mostly in Scott County)
- Tallapoosa

=== Unincorporated communities ===
- Bayouville
- Big Ridge
- Boekerton
- Broadwater
- Como
- Conran
- Dodds
- Farrenburg
- Hartzell
- Hurricane Ridge
- Kewanee
- La Forge
- Lorwood
- Noxall
- Point Pleasant
- Ristine

== Politics ==
=== Local ===
Historically, the Democratic Party completely controlled politics at the local level in New Madrid County. Republicans now control nearly all elected positions in the county.

New Madrid County, Missouri

Elected countywide officials
Assessor	Jacob Johnson	Republican
Circuit Clerk	Shannon Landers	Republican
County Clerk	Nathanial Bock (Interim)	Republican
Collector	Dewayne Nowlin	Republican
Commissioner (presiding)	Mark Baker	Republican
Commissioner (district 1)	Bobby Aycock, Jr.	Republican
Commissioner (district 2)	Mike Kellams	Republican
Coroner	George DeLisle	Republican
Prosecuting Attorney	Andrew Lawson	Republican
Public Administrator	Paula Scobey	Republican
Recorder	Kayla Phillips (Interim)	Republican
Sheriff	Joey Higgerson	Republican
Treasurer	Renee Smith	Republican

=== State ===
New Madrid County is wholly encompassed by the 149th Missouri House of Representatives district and is currently represented by Republican Don Rone of Portageville.

Missouri House – District 149 – New Madrid County (2020)
Party	Candidate	Votes	%	±%
Republican	Don Rone		100.00%	

Missouri House – District 149 – New Madrid County (2018)
Party	Candidate	Votes	%	±%
Republican	Don Rone	4,083	71.57%	
Democratic	William D. "Bill" Burlison	1,468	25.73%	
Independent	Jacqueline T. "Jackie" McGee	154	2.70%	

In the Missouri Senate, all of New Madrid County is a part of Missouri's 25th District and is currently represented by Republican Jason Bean of Poplar Bluff.

Missouri Senate – District 25 – New Madrid County (2020)
Party	Candidate	Votes	%	±%
Republican	Jason Bean		100.00%	

Missouri Senate – District 25 – New Madrid County (2016)
Party	Candidate	Votes	%	±%
Republican	Doug Libla	6,952	58.65%	
Democratic	William D. "Bill" Burlison	3,195	41.35%	

Missouri Senate - District 25 - New Madrid County (2008)
Party	Candidate	Votes	%	±%
Republican	Rob Mayer	4,217	54.53	
Democratic	M. Shane Stoelting	3,517	45.47	

Past Gubernatorial Elections Results
Year	Republican	Democratic	Third Parties
2024	78.32% 5,231	19.55% 1,306	2.12% 142
2020	74.39% 5,338	24.01% 1,723	1.80% 115
2016	60.29% 4,392	37.80% 2,754	1.91% 139
2012	44.64% 2,732	59.70% 4,270	1.49% 120
2008	38.19% 3,574	53.87% 4,313	2.11% 151
2004	47.57% 3,737	51.38% 4,036	1.05% 82
2000	41.28% 2,978	57.50% 4,148	1.22% 88
1996	28.14% 2,106	70.43% 5,270	1.43% 107
1992	38.99% 3,087	61.01% 4,830	0.00% 0
1988	50.94% 3,594	48.89% 3,449	0.17% 12
1984	50.34% 3,979	49.66% 3,926	0.00% 0
1980	38.82% 3,176	61.14% 5,002	0.04% 3
1976	37.75% 2,951	62.20% 4,863	0.05% 4

=== Federal ===
New Madrid County is included in Missouri's 8th Congressional District and is currently represented by Jason T. Smith (R-Salem) in the U.S. House of Representatives. Smith won a special election on Tuesday, June 4, 2013, to finish out the remaining term of U.S. Representative Jo Ann Emerson (R-Cape Girardeau). Emerson announced her resignation a month after being reelected with over 70 percent of the vote in the district. She resigned to become CEO of the National Rural Electric Cooperative.

U.S. House of Representatives – Missouri’s 8th Congressional District – New Madrid County (2020)
Party	Candidate	Votes	%	±%
Republican	Jason Smith	5,326	75.13%	
Democratic	Kathy Ellis	1,676	23.64%	
Libertarian	Tom Schmitz	87	1.23%	

U.S. House of Representatives – Missouri's 8th Congressional District – New Madrid County (2018)
Party	Candidate	Votes	%	±%
Republican	Jason Smith	4,093	72.09%	
Democratic	Kathy Ellis	1,520	26.77%	
Libertarian	Jonathan L. Shell	65	1.14%	

U.S. House of Representatives - District 8 - Special Election – New Madrid County (2013)
Party	Candidate	Votes	%	±%
Democratic	Steve Hodges	1,008	51.85	
Republican	Jason T. Smith	891	45.83	
Constitution	Doug Enyart	25	1.29	
Libertarian	Bill Slantz	20	1.03	

U.S. House of Representatives - District 8 – New Madrid County (2012)
Party	Candidate	Votes	%	±%
Republican	Jo Ann Emerson	4,888	68.30	+6.53
Democratic	Jack Rushin	2,133	29.80	−4.78
Libertarian	Rick Vandeven	136	1.90	+0.39

New Madrid County, along with the rest of the state of Missouri, is represented in the U.S. Senate by Josh Hawley (R-Columbia) and Roy Blunt (R-Strafford).

U.S. Senate – Class I – New Madrid County (2018)
Party	Candidate	Votes	%	±%
Republican	Josh Hawley	3,967	69.09%	
Democratic	Claire McCaskill	1,663	28.96%	
Libertarian	Japheth Campbell	44	0.77%	
Independent	Craig O'Dear	48	0.84%	
Green	Jo Crain	20	0.35%	

Blunt was elected to a second term in 2016 over then-Missouri Secretary of State Jason Kander.

U.S. Senate - Class III - New Madrid County (2016)
Party	Candidate	Votes	%	±%
Republican	Roy Blunt	4,157	57.31%	
Democratic	Jason Kander	2,844	39.21%	
Libertarian	Jonathan Dine	115	1.59%	
Green	Johnathan McFarland	84	1.14%	
Constitution	Fred Ryman	54	0.74%	

==== Political culture ====
United States presidential election results for New Madrid County, Missouri
Year	Republican		Democratic		Third party(ies)	
Year	No.	%	No.	%	No.	%
1888	352	24.01%	1,114	75.99%	0	0.00%
1892	361	21.92%	1,215	73.77%	71	4.31%
1896	480	22.63%	1,639	77.27%	2	0.09%
1900	668	32.55%	1,379	67.20%	5	0.24%
1904	922	41.99%	1,257	57.24%	17	0.77%
1908	1,436	42.55%	1,824	54.04%	115	3.41%
1912	1,607	35.56%	1,945	43.04%	967	21.40%
1916	2,039	41.79%	2,715	55.65%	125	2.56%
1920	3,745	49.95%	3,637	48.51%	116	1.55%
1924	4,018	48.34%	4,167	50.13%	127	1.53%
1928	4,750	53.22%	4,153	46.53%	22	0.25%
1932	3,768	32.34%	7,837	67.26%	47	0.40%
1936	5,056	39.28%	7,791	60.53%	25	0.19%
1940	6,318	39.65%	9,591	60.20%	24	0.15%
1944	4,108	34.96%	7,626	64.89%	18	0.15%
1948	2,082	18.90%	8,925	81.00%	11	0.10%
1952	3,809	30.89%	8,504	68.98%	16	0.13%
1956	3,552	29.67%	8,419	70.33%	0	0.00%
1960	4,205	36.32%	7,373	63.68%	0	0.00%
1964	2,583	25.84%	7,415	74.16%	0	0.00%
1968	2,317	24.40%	4,195	44.18%	2,984	31.42%
1972	4,735	57.50%	3,500	42.50%	0	0.00%
1976	2,798	34.39%	5,319	65.38%	19	0.23%
1980	4,041	48.70%	4,171	50.27%	86	1.04%
1984	4,323	53.38%	3,776	46.62%	0	0.00%
1988	3,387	46.99%	3,812	52.89%	9	0.12%
1992	2,431	29.33%	4,883	58.91%	975	11.76%
1996	2,417	31.93%	4,451	58.80%	702	9.27%
2000	3,416	47.01%	3,738	51.45%	112	1.54%
2004	4,154	52.54%	3,716	47.00%	37	0.47%
2008	4,593	56.76%	3,370	41.65%	129	1.59%
2012	4,284	59.09%	2,814	38.81%	152	2.10%
2016	5,270	71.63%	1,933	26.27%	154	2.09%
2020	5,447	75.13%	1,748	24.11%	55	0.76%
2024	5,203	76.39%	1,561	22.92%	47	0.69%

At the presidential level, New Madrid County, lying in the Missouri Bootheel (one of the regions of Missouri most closely associated with the American South), was powerfully Democratic from shortly after the Civil War through 2000; from 1868 through 2000, it voted Republican only in Harding's, Hoover's, Nixon's, and Reagan's national landslides in 1920, 1928, 1972, and 1984, respectively. However, after the county switched from Gore to Bush in 2004, it has become a Republican stronghold, having, as of 2020, voted Republican five elections in a row, with the Republican vote share increasing in every election. In 2020, Trump exceeded three-quarters of the vote in the county.

Voters in New Madrid County generally adhere to socially and culturally conservative principles but are more moderate or populist on economic issues, typical of the Dixiecrat philosophy. In 2004, Missourians voted on a constitutional amendment to define marriage as the union between a man and a woman. New Madrid County passed it with 83.82 percent of the vote. The initiative passed the state with 71 percent support as Missouri became the first state to ban same-sex marriage. In 2006, Missourians voted on a constitutional amendment to fund and legalize embryonic stem cell research in the state—it failed in New Madrid County with 56.09 percent voting against the measure. The initiative narrowly passed the state with 51 percent of support from voters as Missouri became one of the first states in the nation to approve embryonic stem cell research.

Despite New Madrid County's longstanding tradition of supporting socially conservative platforms, voters in the county support such populist causes as increasing the minimum wage. In 2006, Missourians voted on a proposition (Proposition B) to increase the minimum wage in the state to $6.50 an hour—it passed New Madrid County with 75.66 percent of the vote. The proposition was strongly in every county in Missouri, with 78.99 percent voting in favor. During the same election, voters in five other states also strongly approved increases in the minimum wage.

=== Missouri presidential preference primary (2008) ===
In the 2008 presidential primary, voters in New Madrid County from both political parties supported candidates who finished in second place in the state at large and nationally. Former U.S. Senator Hillary Clinton (D-New York) received more votes, a total of 1,801, than any candidate from either party in New Madrid County during the 2008 presidential primary. She also received more votes than the total number of votes cast in the entire Republican Primary in New Madrid County.

== See also ==
- National Register of Historic Places listings in New Madrid County, Missouri
- New Madrid Floodway Project
- New Madrid Seismic Zone
