= 2008 United States Senate election in Tennessee =

- November 4, 2008
- Turnout: 66.34% ▲15.94 pp
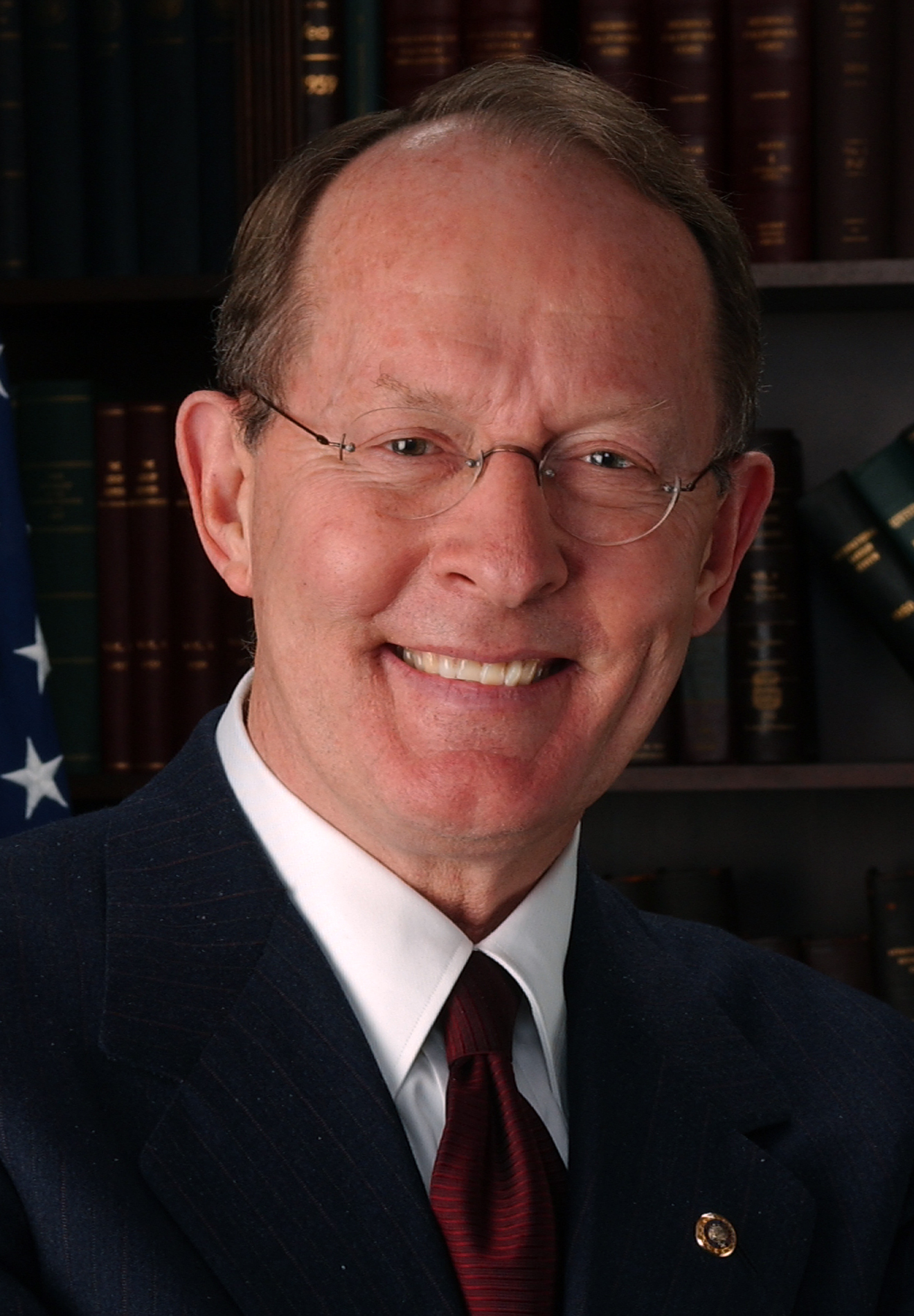

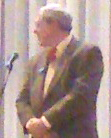
Nominee	Lamar Alexander	Bob Tuke
Party	Republican	Democratic
Popular vote	1,571,637	767,236
Percentage	65.14%	31.64%
- Alexander: 40–50% 50–60% 60–70% 70–80% 80–90% >90% Tuke: 40–50% 50–60% 60–70% 70–80% 80–90% >90% Tie: 50%
U.S. senator before election
Lamar Alexander
Republican
Elected U.S. senator
Lamar Alexander
Republican

The 2008 United States Senate election in Tennessee was held on November 4, 2008, to elect a member of the United States Senate to represent the state of Tennessee. Republican incumbent Lamar Alexander won re-election to a second term, defeating Democratic former state party chair Bob Tuke.

Alexander flipped reliably Democratic Davidson County, home to Nashville which has not voted Republican on a presidential level since 1988. With that, he also won 65.1% of the vote against Tuke, who won just 32.6%. Alexander also won 28% of the African American vote.

== Republican primary ==
=== Candidates ===
==== Nominee ====
- Lamar Alexander, incumbent U.S. senator (2003–2021)

=== Results ===
Republican Party primary results
Party	Candidate	Votes	%
Republican	Lamar Alexander (Incumbent)	244,222	100.00%
Total votes		244,222	100.00%

== Democratic primary ==
=== Candidates ===
==== Nominee ====
- Bob Tuke, former chairman of the Democratic Party of Tennessee (2005–2007)

==== Eliminated in primary ====
- Gary Davis, perennial candidate
- Mike Padgett, former Knox County Clerk
- Mark E. Clayton, insurance agent
- Kenneth Eaton, businessman and Nashville mayoral candidate in 2003 and 2007
- Leonard Ladner, truck-driver

=== Campaign ===
Mike Padgett finished third after Gary Davis, who did not campaign and used no money. Many were surprised at the results. They claimed that perhaps there was name confusion, with two incumbent congressmen David Davis and Lincoln Davis.

=== Results ===
Democratic Party primary results
Party	Candidate	Votes	%
Democratic	Bob Tuke	59,050	32.21%
Democratic	Gary G. Davis	39,119	21.34%
Democratic	Mike Padgett	33,471	18.26%
Democratic	Mark E. Clayton	32,309	17.62%
Democratic	Kenneth Eaton	14,702	8.02%
Democratic	Leonard D. Ladner	4,697	2.55%
Total votes		183,348	100.00%

== General election ==
=== Candidates ===
==== Major ====
- Lamar Alexander (R), incumbent U.S. Senator and former Governor
- Bob Tuke (D), Chairman of the Democratic Party of Tennessee (2005–2007)

==== Minor ====
In Tennessee, a candidate seeking a House or Senate seat at the state or national level must gather 25 signatures from registered voters to be put on the ballot for any elected office. Presidential candidates seeking to represent an officially recognized party must either be named as candidates by the Tennessee Secretary of State or gather 2,500 signatures from registered voters, and an independent candidate for president must gather 275 signatures and put forward a full slate of eleven candidates who have agreed to serve as electors. In order to be recognized as a party and have its candidates listed on the ballot under that party's name, a political party must gather signatures equal to or in excess of 2.5% of the total number of votes cast in the last election (about 45,000 signatures based on the election held in 2006). The last third party to be officially recognized was the American Party in 1968; none of its candidates received five percent of the statewide vote in 1970 and it was then subject to decertification as an official party.. Due to these hurdles third party candidates almost always appear on the ballot as independents.

- Edward Buck (I)
- Christopher Fenner (I)
- David "None of the Above" Gatchell (I)
- Bo Heyward (I)
- Ed Lawhorn (I)
- Daniel T. Lewis (L)
- Chris Lugo (I), Green party peace activist

=== Campaign ===
On April 3, 2007, Alexander confirmed that he would seek re-election to the Senate in 2008. Alexander has remained a popular figure in Tennessee since his first term as governor and faced no opposition in the Republican primary Tuke is a former Marine who served in the Vietnam War. Tuke served as Barack Obama's Presidential campaign chair in Tennessee. Tuke declared himself to be a candidate March 3, 2008, and he secured the help of several high-profile Democratic campaigners including Joe Trippi. There were many minor candidates in the race. Chris Lugo announced on January 17 that he was seeking the nomination of the Democratic Party as a 'Progressive Democrat.' In March 2008, Lugo announced he was dropping his candidacy for the Democratic nomination, and would run either for the Green Party nomination or as an independent.

=== Predictions ===
Source	Ranking	As of
The Cook Political Report	Safe R	October 23, 2008
CQ Politics	Likely R	October 31, 2008
Rothenberg Political Report	Safe R	November 2, 2008
Real Clear Politics	Safe R	November 4, 2008

=== Polling ===
Aggregate polls

Source of poll aggregation	Dates administered	Dates updated	Lamar Alexander (R)	Bob Tuke (R)	Other/Undecided (Note: Calculated by taking the difference of 100% and all other candidates combined.)	Margin
RealClearPolitics	September 15 – October 22, 2008	October 22, 2008	57.0%	32.5%	10.5%	Alexander +24.5%

Poll source	Date(s) administered	Sample size (Note: Key: A – all adults RV – registered voters LV – likely voters V – unclear)	Margin of error	Lamar Alexander (R)	Bob Tuke (D)	Other	Undecided
Rasmussen Reports	October 16, 2008	500 (LV)	± 4.5%	62%	34%	–	4%
Research 2000 (Note: Poll sponsored by Daily Kos)	October 21–22, 2008	600 (LV)	± 4.0%	59%	37%	–	4%
Rasmussen Reports	September 29, 2008	500 (LV)	–	56%	32%	–	12%
Middle Tennessee State University	September 15–27, 2008	635 (LV)	± 4.0%	50%	26%	1%	23%
Mason-Dixon Polling & Strategy (Note: Poll commissioned by the Chattanooga Free Times Press)	September 22–24, 2008	625 (LV)	± 4.0%	57%	33%	–	10%
Ayres McHenry (R) (Note: Poll sponsored by Alexander's campaign)	August 10–12, 2008	500 (RV)	± 4.4%	60%	30%	–	10%
Rasmussen Reports	April 3, 2008	500 (LV)	± 4.5%	59%	30%	4%	7%

Hypothetical polling

Poll source	Date(s) administered	Sample size	Margin of error	Lamar Alexander (R)	Mike Padgett (D)	Other	Undecided
Rasmussen Reports	April 3, 2008	500 (LV)	± 4.5%	58%	31%	4%	7%

== Results ==
United States Senate election in Tennessee, 2008
Party	Candidate	Votes	%	±%
Republican	Lamar Alexander (Incumbent)	1,579,477	65.14%	+10.87%
Democratic	Bob Tuke	767,236	31.64%	−12.69%
Independent	Edward L. Buck	31,631	1.30%	N/A
Independent	Christopher G. Fenner	11,073	0.46%	N/A
Independent	Daniel Towers Lewis	9,367	0.39%	N/A
Independent	Chris Lugo	9,170	0.38%	N/A
Independent	Ed Lawhorn	8,986	0.37%	N/A
Independent	David Gatchell	7,645	0.32%	N/A
Majority		812,241	33.50%	+23.56%
Turnout		2,424,585	66.34%	
Republican hold		Swing		

=== By county ===
County	Lamar Alexander Republican		Bob Tuke Democratic		Others Independent		Margin	Total votes
County	%	#	%	#	%	#	Margin	Total votes
Anderson	71.40%	21,365	25.65%	7,675	2.95%	883	13,690	29,923
Bedford	70.37%	9,717	25.70%	3,548	3.93%	543	6,169	13,808
Benton	59.71%	3,614	36.63%	2,217	3.66%	222	1,397	6,053
Bledsoe	68.87%	3,105	27.77%	1,252	3.36%	151	1,853	4,508
Blount	79.16%	38,961	17.60%	8,664	3.24%	1,593	30,297	49,218
Bradley	79.41%	28,820	17.87%	6,485	2.72%	986	22,335	36,291
Campbell	71.96%	8,264	24.29%	2,790	3.75%	430	5,474	11,484
Cannon	64.39%	3,125	29.53%	1,433	6.08%	295	1,692	4,853
Carroll	67.83%	7,254	28.75%	3,075	3.42%	366	4,179	10,695
Carter	79.75%	16,148	17.03%	3,448	3.22%	653	12,700	20,249
Cheatham	69.39%	10,665	27.07%	4,160	3.54%	544	6,505	15,369
Chester	73.99%	4,403	22.58%	1,344	3.43%	204	3,059	5,951
Claiborne	73.36%	7,095	23.22%	2,246	3.42%	330	4,849	9,671
Clay	63.00%	1,623	33.07%	852	3.93%	101	771	2,576
Cocke	77.38%	8,742	19.75%	2,231	2.87%	325	6,511	11,298
Coffee	65.84%	13,173	29.91%	5,985	4.25%	850	7,188	20,008
Crockett	72.58%	3,766	24.55%	1,274	2.87%	149	2,492	5,189
Cumberland	72.06%	17,094	24.15%	5,730	3.79%	898	11,364	23,722
Davidson	49.17%	119,996	47.27%	115,354	3.56%	8,699	4,642	244,049
Decatur	64.53%	2,958	32.46%	1,488	3.01%	138	1,470	4,584
DeKalb	64.55%	3,914	30.70%	1,861	4.75%	288	2,053	6,063
Dickson	62.18%	11,264	33.41%	6,053	4.41%	799	5,211	18,116
Dyer	73.34%	9,533	23.04%	2,995	3.62%	471	6,538	12,999
Fayette	70.03%	12,457	27.69%	4,925	2.28%	405	7,532	17,787
Fentress	76.41%	4,469	19.95%	1,167	3.64%	213	3,302	5,849
Franklin	64.94%	10,461	31.44%	5,064	3.62%	583	5,397	16,108
Gibson	69.46%	13,208	27.20%	5,172	3.34%	634	8,036	19,014
Giles	62.02%	6,355	33.51%	3,433	4.47%	458	2,922	10,246
Grainger	75.52%	5,229	20.87%	1,445	3.61%	250	3,784	6,924
Greene	77.37%	18,468	20.06%	4,788	2.57%	613	13,680	23,869
Grundy	57.93%	2,368	38.43%	1,571	3.64%	149	797	4,088
Hamblen	76.45%	16,191	20.90%	4,426	2.65%	561	11,765	21,178
Hamilton	64.34%	91,563	33.56%	47,754	2.10%	2,987	43,809	142,304
Hancock	77.28%	1,537	19.41%	386	3.32%	66	1,151	1,989
Hardeman	51.82%	5,144	45.09%	4,476	3.09%	307	668	9,927
Hardin	72.31%	6,770	24.61%	2,304	3.08%	288	4,466	9,362
Hawkins	75.06%	15,260	21.83%	4,437	3.11%	633	10,823	20,330
Haywood	45.32%	3,402	52.87%	3,969	1.81%	136	-567	7,507
Henderson	73.29%	7,367	23.44%	2,356	3.27%	329	5,011	10,052
Henry	66.78%	8,084	30.29%	3,667	2.93%	355	4,417	12,106
Hickman	60.22%	4,738	34.76%	2,735	5.02%	395	2,003	7,868
Houston	52.95%	1,572	43.55%	1,293	3.50%	104	279	2,969
Humphreys	55.52%	3,965	40.99%	2,927	3.49%	249	1,038	7,141
Jackson	52.86%	2,097	42.15%	1,672	4.99%	198	425	3,967
Jefferson	77.03%	13,542	19.31%	3,395	3.66%	644	10,147	17,581
Johnson	76.12%	4,620	19.62%	1,191	4.25%	258	3,429	6,069
Knox	71.22%	126,776	25.75%	45,844	3.03%	5,388	80,932	178,008
Lake	56.47%	1,038	37.27%	685	6.26%	115	353	1,838
Lauderdale	64.58%	5,256	32.31%	2,630	3.11%	253	2,626	8,139
Lawrence	70.50%	10,115	26.21%	3,761	3.28%	471	6,354	14,347
Lewis	63.73%	2,857	31.92%	1,431	4.35%	195	1,426	4,483
Lincoln	69.94%	8,653	25.84%	3,197	4.22%	522	5,456	12,372
Loudon	80.28%	17,110	17.16%	3,658	2.55%	544	13,452	21,312
Macon	72.23%	4,665	21.40%	1,382	6.38%	412	3,283	6,459
Madison	59.15%	23,890	37.96%	15,333	2.89%	1,167	8,557	40,390
Marion	62.18%	6,803	34.76%	3,803	3.05%	334	3,000	10,940
Marshall	64.59%	6,675	30.69%	3,172	4.72%	488	3,503	10,335
Maury	61.94%	20,330	34.59%	11,355	3.47%	1,138	8,975	32,823
McMinn	75.35%	13,464	21.45%	3,832	3.20%	572	9,632	17,868
McNairy	69.29%	6,908	27.91%	2,783	2.80%	279	4,125	9,970
Meigs	72.33%	2,807	24.50%	951	3.17%	123	1,856	3,881
Monroe	75.18%	12,198	21.83%	3,541	2.99%	485	8,657	16,224
Montgomery	62.65%	31,012	33.01%	16,337	4.34%	2,148	14,675	49,497
Moore	70.01%	1,989	26.43%	751	3.55%	101	1,238	2,841
Morgan	75.86%	4,746	21.32%	1,334	2.81%	176	3,412	6,256
Obion	68.18%	8,056	28.65%	3,385	3.17%	374	4,671	11,815
Overton	62.19%	4,220	34.03%	2,309	3.79%	257	1,911	6,786
Perry	58.04%	1,559	38.20%	1,026	3.76%	101	533	2,686
Pickett	73.55%	1,805	23.43%	575	3.02%	74	1,230	2,454
Polk	67.83%	4,233	28.75%	1,794	3.43%	214	2,439	6,241
Putnam	67.38%	16,629	28.32%	6,990	4.30%	1,061	9,639	24,680
Rhea	76.67%	7,907	20.38%	2,102	2.95%	304	5,805	10,313
Roane	74.55%	16,617	22.62%	5,042	2.83%	632	11,575	22,291
Robertson	69.49%	17,485	26.80%	6,744	3.70%	932	10,741	25,161
Rutherford	65.44%	62,464	30.28%	28,906	4.28%	4,084	33,558	95,454
Scott	77.74%	4,501	18.98%	1,099	3.28%	190	3,412	5,790
Sequatchie	71.66%	3,553	24.97%	1,238	3.37%	167	2,315	4,958
Sevier	79.52%	26,021	16.93%	5,539	3.55%	1,161	20,482	32,721
Shelby	50.88%	189,851	46.61%	173,924	2.51%	9,364	15,927	373,139
Smith	64.16%	4,458	30.74%	2,136	5.10%	354	2,322	6,948
Stewart	59.87%	3,006	35.43%	1,779	4.70%	236	1,227	5,021
Sullivan	77.15%	47,721	20.86%	12,906	1.99%	1,229	34,815	61,856
Sumner	71.84%	44,945	24.19%	15,134	3.97%	2,484	29,811	62,563
Tipton	74.22%	17,157	22.92%	5,299	2.86%	660	11,858	23,116
Trousdale	62.75%	1,725	32.38%	890	4.87%	134	835	2,749
Unicoi	78.35%	5,251	18.76%	1,257	2.89%	194	3,994	6,702
Union	75.82%	4,276	20.20%	1,139	3.99%	225	3,137	5,640
Van Buren	62.27%	1,223	33.66%	661	4.07%	80	562	1,964
Warren	64.02%	8,225	31.49%	4,045	4.49%	577	4,180	12,847
Washington	75.92%	34,592	21.32%	9,715	2.76%	1,256	24,877	45,563
Wayne	76.18%	3,685	21.40%	1,035	2.42%	117	2,650	4,837
Weakley	66.69%	8,546	29.73%	3,809	3.58%	459	4,737	12,814
White	66.20%	5,969	29.06%	2,620	4.74%	427	3,349	9,016
Williamson	75.49%	68,258	21.46%	19,405	3.05%	2,759	48,853	90,422
Wilson	70.78%	34,781	24.91%	12,240	4.31%	2,122	22,541	49,143
Total	65.14%	1,579,477	31.64%	767,236	3.21%	77,872	812,241	2,424,585

==== Counties that flipped from Democratic to Republican ====
- Bedford (Largest city: Shelbyville)
- Benton (Largest city: Camden)
- Campbell (Largest city: LaFollette)
- Cannon (Largest city: Woodbury)
- Clay (Largest city: Celina)
- Crockett (Largest city: Bells)
- Davidson (Largest city: Nashville)
- Decatur (Largest city: Parsons)
- DeKalb (Largest city: Smithville)
- Dickson (Largest city: Dickson)
- Franklin (Largest city: Winchester)
- Giles (Largest city: Pulaski)
- Grundy (Largest town: Altamont)
- Hardeman (Largest city: Bolivar)
- Henry (Largest city: Paris)
- Hickman (Largest city: Centerville)
- Houston (Largest city: Erin)
- Humphreys (Largest town: Waverly)
- Jackson (Largest town: Gainesboro)
- Lake (Largest town: Tiptonville)
- Lauderdale (Largest city: Ripley)
- Lewis (Largest city: Hohenwald)
- Macon (Largest city: Lafayette)
- Marion (Largest city: Jasper)
- Marshall (Largest city: Lewisburg)
- Morgan (Largest city: Coalfield)
- Obion (Largest city: Union City)
- Overton (Largest municipality: Livingston)
- Perry (Largest municipality: Linden)
- Robertson (Largest city: Springfield)
- Sequatchie (Largest city: Dunlap)
- Smith (Largest municipality: Carthage)
- Stewart (Largest municipality: Dover)
- Trousdale (Largest municipality: Hartsville)
- Van Buren (Largest municipality: Spencer)
- Warren (Largest city: McMinnville)
- Weakley (Largest city: Martin)
- White (Largest city: Sparta)

== See also ==
- 2008 United States elections
- 2008 Tennessee elections
- 2008 United States presidential election in Tennessee
- 2008 United States House of Representatives elections in Tennessee

== Notes ==
Partisan clients
