= Tennessee State Route 157 =

Highway in Tennessee

State Route 157
- Walnut Road
- SR 157 highlighted in red

Route information
- Maintained by TDOT
- Length: 5.30 mi (8.53 km)

Major junctions
- South end: SR 22 near Samburg
- North end: KY 311 at the Kentucky state line near Reelfoot National Wildlife Refuge

Location
- Country: United States
- State: Tennessee
- Counties: Obion

Highway system
- Tennessee State Routes; Interstate; US; State
← SR 156	→ SR 158

State Route 157 (SR 157) is a short secondary highway in northern Obion County, Tennessee.

== Route description ==
SR 157 begins at its junction with SR 22 northeast of Samburg and continues in a northerly direction toward the Kentucky/Tennessee state line as it passes through or nearby the unincorporated communities Walnut Log and Fishgap Hill. At the state line, the route changes to Kentucky Route 311 and continues on to Hickman, Kentucky. This highway carries a 55 mph (89 km/h) speed limit and is designated as a secondary highway throughout its entire length in the State of Tennessee. It also passes through the Reelfoot National Wildlife Refuge.

== Points of Interest (South to North) ==
- Reelfoot National Wildlife Refuge/Lake Isom National Wildlife Refuge Headquarters and Visitor Center
- Reelfoot National Wildlife Refuge—Grassy Island Unit—Auto Tour, Hiking Trails, and Boat it Ramp off Walnut Log Road
- Reelfoot National Wildlife Refuge—Long Point Unit—Access via Kentucky Route 311 and Kentucky Route 1282

== Major intersections ==
The entire route is in Obion County.

Location	mi	km	Destinations	Notes
	0.0	0.0	SR 22 (W Highway 22) – Samburg, Union City	Southern terminus
	5.30	8.53	KY 311 north – Hickman	Kentucky state line; northern terminus
1.000 mi = 1.609 km; 1.000 km = 0.621 mi
