= Reelfoot National Wildlife Refuge =

Protected area in the United States

- IUCN category IV (habitat/species management area)
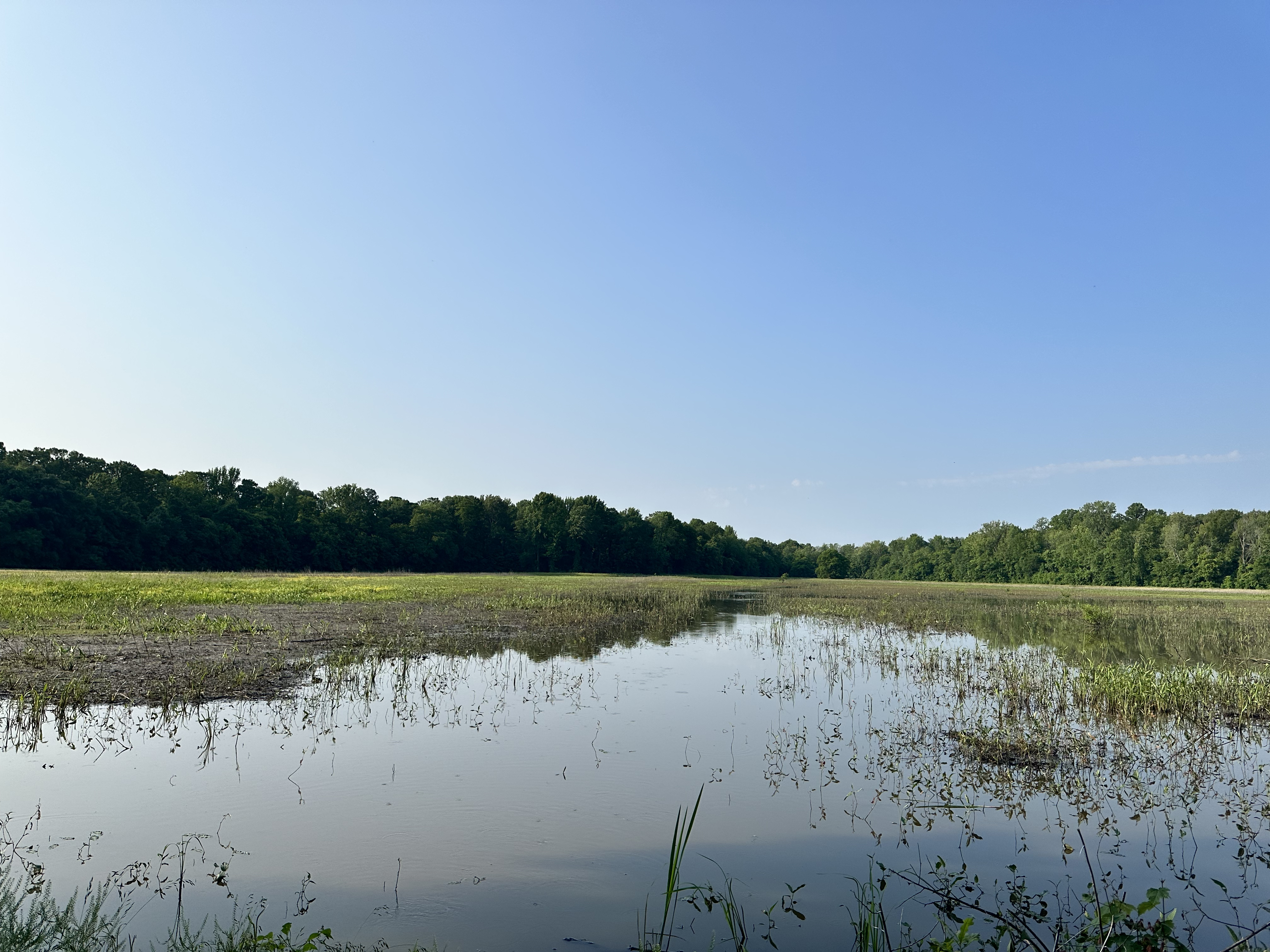
- The Reelfoot National Wildlife Refuge in 2023

- Location within the United States
- Location: Fulton County, Kentucky, Lake, Obion counties, Tennessee, United States
- Nearest city: Tiptonville, Tennessee
- Coordinates: 36°27′30″N 89°20′00″W
- Area: 10,428 acres (42.20 km^{2})
- Established: 1941
- Governing body: U.S. Fish and Wildlife Service
- Website: Reelfoot National Wildlife Refuge

Reelfoot National Wildlife Refuge is a part of the U.S. system of National Wildlife Refuges consisting of an area of Northwest Tennessee and Western Kentucky that consists primarily of a buffer zone around Reelfoot Lake, Tennessee's only large natural lake. It formed after the New Madrid earthquakes of 1811–1812 and is one of the Mississippi River Basin's richest locations for waterfowl, aquatic life, and other wildlife.

It covers 10,428 acres (4,220 ha) and comprises primarily lands adjacent to the lake that have not been included in the Tennessee State Park system, as part of Reelfoot Lake State Park. The refuge was established in 1941 and has been expanded on several occasions. Some of it consists of agricultural land that is leased to farmers, but they are required to use stricter conservation practices than were widespread when the same land was held in private ownership, primarily to lessen the siltation of the lake and surrounding bodies of water.
