= Blue Bank, Tennessee =

Unincorporated community in Tennessee, US

Coordinates: 36.352°N 89.425°W

Blue Bank is an unincorporated community in eastern Lake County, Tennessee.

Blue Bank is on the southern shores of Reelfoot Lake. The community is also the location of Reelfoot Lake State Park.
