= Lake County High School (Tiptonville, Tennessee) =

Location
- 300 Cochran Street; Tiptonville, Tennessee 38079; United States; 36.3754°N 89.4726°W

Information
- Established: 1963
- School district: Lake County School System
- CEEB code: 432267
- Principal: Mike Moore
- Staff: 19.17 (FTE)
- Grades: 9-12
- Enrollment: 209 (2023-2024)
- Student to teacher ratio: 10.90
- Color
- Athletics: Football, Baseball, Basketball, Softball, Co-Ed Cheer, Volleyball.
- Mascot: Falcon
- Newspaper: The Falcon Review
- Website: https://lchs.lcfalcons.net/

Lake County High School is a secondary school in Tiptonville, Tennessee. Established in 1963, the school serves students in grades 9-12.

== History ==
Lake County led the state with the first county high school in 1900, when the court voted to establish a high school in Tiptonville, which would be free to all students in the county. The $7,500.00 needed to build the school was raised by public subscription. The two-story brick building was built on Church Street on what is now used as the cemetery. An annex was added for the elementary grades.

In 1925, a new school with both room for high and elementary school was built on Cherry Street. It hosted a large auditorium and under it a large room where the first hot lunch program was started by the P.T.A. in the late 1930s.

In 1963, a consolidated high school was built in Tiptonville to accommodate students from Tiptonville and Ridgely High Schools and later Lincoln High School. Mr. Ellis Truett was the first principal of Lake County High School and guided it through the early years of consolidation and integration. In 1967, the first black students entered LCHS.

Lake County High School is accredited by the Southern Association of Colleges and Schools.

== Curriculum ==
Lake County High School offers a comprehensive curriculum with tracks for university preparation and technical career preparation. Students may enroll in dual-credit college coursework with the University of Tennessee at Martin. Vocational courses at the school include business, carpentry, criminal justice, family and consumer sciences, health science, and leisure craft (small engines).

== Extracurricular activities ==
Student groups and activities include Beta Club, cheerleading, dance team, FBLA, FCCLA, Fellowship of Christian Athletes, Band, Art, student council, Upward Bound, and yearbook.

The school's athletic teams, known as the Lake County Falcons, compete in Tennessee Secondary School Athletic Association size classification A, district 14. Teams are fielded in baseball, basketball, football, volleyball and softball.

The Falcons' football team won the TSSAA Class A State Championship in 1980, 1985, and 2019.

Lake County won its first boys' basketball state championship in 2011. The team finished the season 26-10, were led by first-year head coach Dawn Barger. She is believed to be the first female to coach a boys' basketball team to a state championship.

== Notable alumni ==
- Marla Cilley, FlyLady
- Jerry Reese, Former General Manager of the New York Giants
