= Tickler file =

Collection of date-labeled file folders

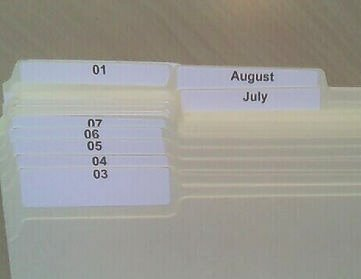
A simple tickler file may use any number of folders.

A tickler file or 43 Folders System is a collection of date-labeled file folders organized in a way that allows time-sensitive documents to be filed according to the future date on which each document needs action. Documents within the folders of a tickler file can be to-do lists, pending bills, unpaid invoices, travel tickets, hotel reservations, meeting information, birthday reminders, coupons, claim tickets, call-back notes, follow-up reminders, maintenance reminders, or any other papers that require future action. Each day, the folder having the current date is retrieved from the tickler file so that any documents within it may be acted on. Essentially, a tickler file provides a way to send a reminder to oneself in the future—"tickling" one's memory.

== History ==
One common implementation was in law offices in the early twentieth century, if not before, where small task cards or "tickler cards" would be filed by date and then distributed to lawyers as legal tasks such as renewal of trademarks, updating of wills, and filing of motions for a particular case would be approaching. In larger firms a single person would be assigned the maintenance and follow-up of this file, distributing tasks and ensuring their follow-up, which could be recorded on the cards for billing and documentation.

More recently the concept was re-introduced to popular culture through various self-help books as Pam Young and Peggy Jones' 1977 book Sidetracked Home Executives: From Pig-Pen to Paradise, FlyLady Marla Ciley, Chris Crouch's book Getting Organized, David Allen's 2001 book Getting Things Done, and Merlin Mann's website 43 Folders, whose name comes from one popular method for maintaining a tickler file.

== Current uses ==
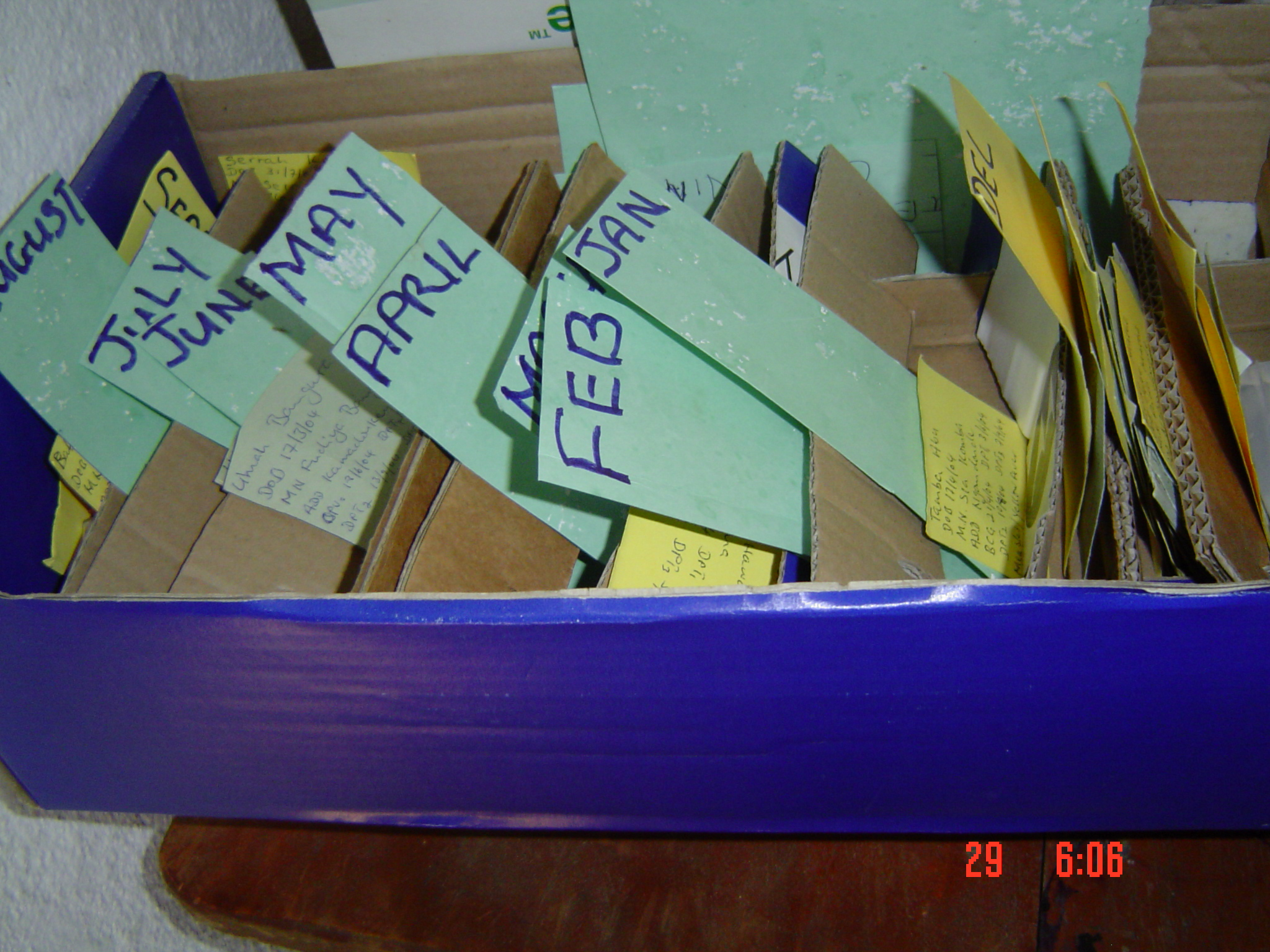
Tickler box in Masundu health center, Kono District, Sierra Leone

Modern tickler files are often electronic and now fulfilled via software programmed for automatic reminders and tracking.

Tickler systems are also used in industrialized and less industrialized countries to improve immunization coverage. Typically, a child's name and birth date are put on a card, which is then put in the tickler file corresponding to when their next immunization is due. The vaccinator can then find the names of all the children with immunizations due on any particular month and direct her or his efforts to finding those particular children.

== 43 divisions ==
In larger institutional uses, a tickler file would be chronological, with one section for each year or day, sometimes encompassing more than a century in as much detail as appropriate (especially for dates far in the future). A more common technique is to have index cards with forty-three dividers or a system with forty-three folders or two accordion files. The forty-three divisions come from the sum of two numbers, thirty-one and twelve, corresponding to the maximum thirty-one days in a month and the twelve months in a year.

Using folders, items scheduled for the current month are placed within the appropriate daily folder. Items which need to be done in a future month are placed in the corresponding monthly folder. Every day, the current daily folder is emptied and placed at the back of the set. At the start of a new month, the items for that month are removed from the month folder and placed in the corresponding daily folders.

Simple systems which involve many repetitive tasks over time tend to use and re-use index cards of an appropriate size, with more complex systems using expandable "accordion files", file folders, or even entire rooms full of filing cabinets. Modern systems are usually maintained in computerized databases or with simple tools such as a Unix "calendar" file, a Microsoft Outlook calendar, etc.

== See also ==
- Calendar
- Time management
