= 2008 United States presidential election in Tennessee =

- November 4, 2008
- Turnout: 66.34% (▲0.02 pp)

Nominee	John McCain	Barack Obama
Party	Republican	Democratic
Home state	Arizona	Illinois
Running mate	Sarah Palin	Joe Biden
Electoral vote	11	0
Popular vote	1,479,178	1,087,437
Percentage	56.85%	41.79%

McCain
40–50%
50–60%
60–70%
70–80%
80–90%
90–100%
Obama
40–50%
50–60%
60–70%
70–80%
80–90%
90–100%
Tie/No data
President before election
George W. Bush
Republican
Elected President
Barack Obama
Democratic

The 2008 United States presidential election in Tennessee was held on November 4, 2008, and was part of the 2008 United States presidential election. Voters chose 11 representatives, or electors, to the Electoral College, who voted for president and vice president.

Republican John McCain defeated Democrat Barack Obama in the state by 15 percentage points. Prior to the election, 17 news organizations had correctly predicted that McCain would easily carry the state, and virtually all polling indicated the same. Most news organizations called Tennessee for McCain immediately after the polls closed. McCain slightly improved upon George W. Bush's performance in 2004, despite the nation as a whole trending significantly Democratic in 2008. This was the first time since 1960 that Tennessee did not back the overall winning candidate in a presidential election. Furthermore, this was the first time it voted differently from swing state Ohio since 1944, and the first time it voted Republican while that state voted Democratic.

McCain became the first Republican to ever carry historically-Democratic Stewart County. As of 2024, this remains the last time that Houston County and Jackson County have voted for a Democratic presidential nominee or that the party has received more than 40% of the vote. It was one of five states to swing Republican from 2004, along with West Virginia, Louisiana, Oklahoma, and Arkansas.

== Primary elections ==
=== Democratic primary ===
2008 Tennessee Democratic presidential primary
- February 5, 2008

58 Democratic National Convention delegates

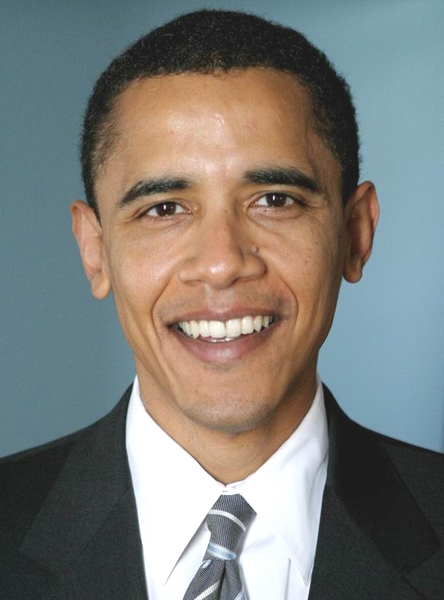
Candidate	Hillary Clinton	Barack Obama
Home state	New York	Illinois
Delegate count	40	28
Popular vote	336,245	254,874
Percentage	53.82%	40.48%
- Results by county Clinton: 40–50% 50–60% 60–70% 70–80% 80–90% Obama: 40–50% 50–60% 60–70%

The 2008 Tennessee Democratic presidential primary took place on Super Tuesday, February 5, 2008. Hillary Clinton won with 53.8% of the vote and was awarded 40 delegates. Barack Obama placed second, getting 40.5% of the vote and was awarded 28 delegates.

Key:	Withdrew prior to contest

2008 Tennessee Democratic presidential primary
Candidate	Votes	Percentage	National delegates
Hillary Clinton	336,245	53.82%	40
Barack Obama	254,874	40.48%	28
John Edwards	27,820	4.45%	0
Joe Biden	1,531	0.25%	0
Bill Richardson	1,178	0.19%	0
Dennis Kucinich	971	0.16%	0
Christopher Dodd	526	0.08%	0
Mike Gravel	461	0.07%	0
Uncommitted	3,158	0.51%	0
Totals	624,764	100.00%	68

=== Republican primary ===
2008 Tennessee Republican presidential primary
- February 5, 2008

52 Republican National Convention delegates
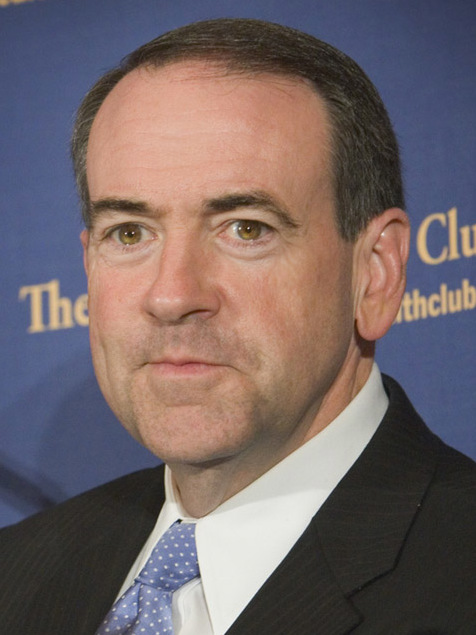

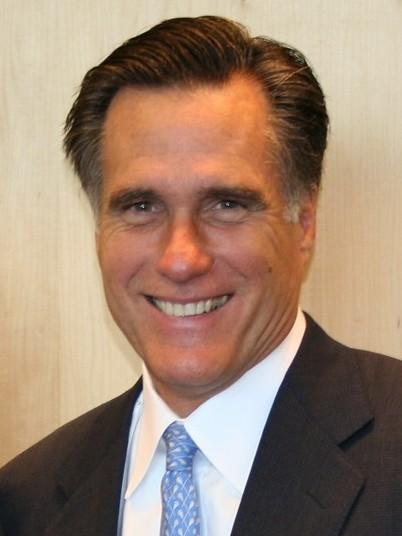

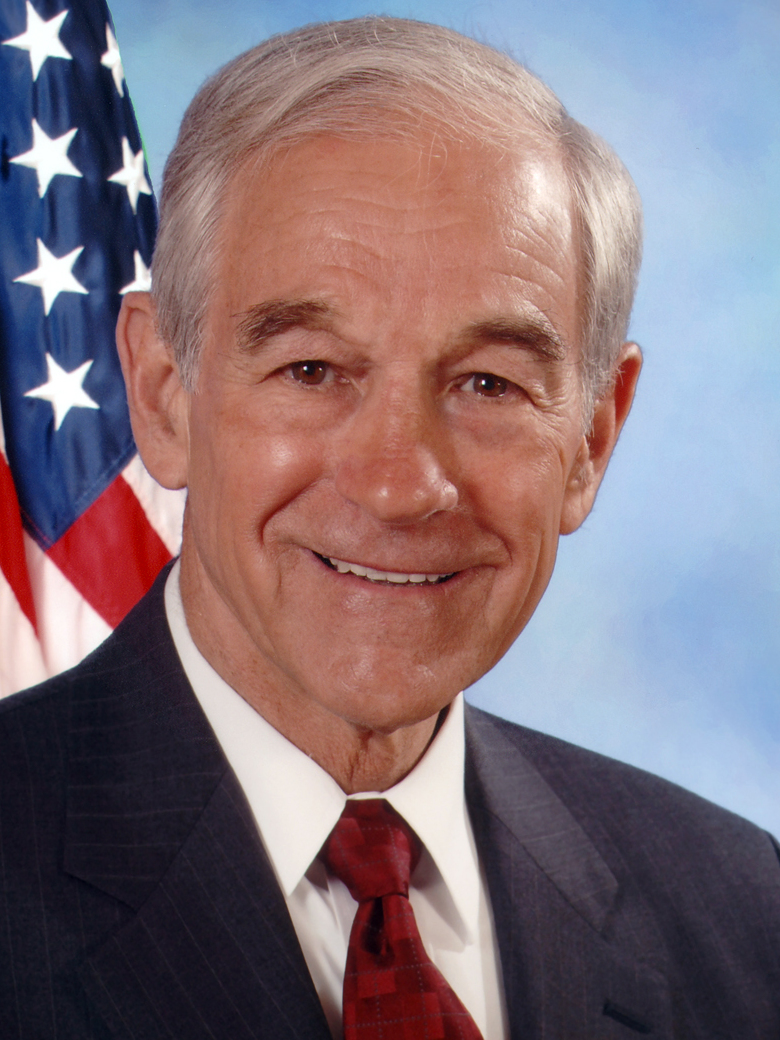
Candidate	Mike Huckabee	John McCain
Home state	Arkansas	Arizona
Delegate count	25	19
Popular vote	190,904	176,091
Percentage	34.37%	31.84%
Candidate	Mitt Romney	Ron Paul
Home state	Massachusetts	Texas
Delegate count	8	0
Popular vote	130,632	31,026
Percentage	23.62%	5.61%

Huckabee
McCain
Romney
Huckabee
30 – 40%
40 – 50%
50 – 60%
McCain
30 – 40%
40 – 50%
Romney
30 – 40%

The 2008 Tennessee Republican presidential primary took place on Super Tuesday, February 5, 2008. Mike Huckabee narrowly defeated John McCain to win the largest share of Tennessee's delegates to the 2008 Republican National Convention. Both McCain and the third-place candidate Mitt Romney received delegates along with Huckabee.

2008 Tennessee Republican presidential primary
Candidate	Votes	Percentage	Delegates
Mike Huckabee	190,904	34.37%	25
John McCain	176,091	31.84%	19
Mitt Romney	130,632	23.62%	8
Ron Paul	31,026	5.61%	0
Fred Thompson*	16,263	2.94%	0
Rudy Giuliani*	5,159	0.93%	0
Alan Keyes	978	0.18%	0
Duncan Hunter*	738	0.13%	0
Tom Tancredo*	194	0.03%	0
Uncommitted	1,830	0.33%	0
Total	553,005	100.00%	52

* Candidate dropped out of the race before the primary

== Results ==
=== Predictions ===
There were 16 news organizations who made state-by-state predictions of the election. Here are their last predictions before election day:

Source	Ranking
D.C. Political Report	Likely R
Cook Political Report	Solid R
The Takeaway	Solid R
Electoral-vote.com	Solid R
Washington Post	Solid R
Politico	Solid R
RealClearPolitics	Solid R
FiveThirtyEight	Solid R
CQ Politics	Solid R
The New York Times	Solid R
CNN	Safe R
NPR	Solid R
MSNBC	Solid R
Fox News	Likely R
Associated Press	Likely R
Rasmussen Reports	Safe R

=== Polling ===
McCain won every single pre-election poll, and each by a double-digit margin of victory. The final 3 polls averaged McCain leading 55% to 40%.

=== Fundraising ===
John McCain raised a total of $2,941,065 in the state. Barack Obama raised $3,481,341.

=== Advertising and visits ===
Obama spent $518,659. The Republican ticket spent just $3,526. Obama visited the state once, going to Nashville. McCain visited the state twice, visiting Nashville and Blountville.

=== Results ===
2008 United States presidential election in Tennessee
Party	Candidate	Votes	%
Republican	John McCain Sarah Palin	1,479,178	56.85%
Democratic	Barack Obama Joe Biden	1,087,437	41.79%
Independent	Ralph Nader Matt Gonzalez	11,560	0.44%
Libertarian	Bob Barr Wayne Allyn Root	8,547	0.33%
Constitution	Chuck Baldwin Darrell Castle	8,191	0.31%
Green	Cynthia McKinney Rosa Clemente	2,499	0.10%
Independent	(write-in)	2,333	0.09%
Socialist	Brian Moore Stewart Alexander	1,326	0.05%
Boston Tea Party (political party)	Charles Jay Thomas Knapp	1,011	0.04%
Total votes		2,601,982	100.00%
Turnout		2,618,238	66.34%
Republican hold			

==== By county ====
County	John McCain Republican		Barack Obama Democratic		Various candidates Other parties		Margin		Total
County	#	%	#	%	#	%	#	%	Total
Anderson	19,675	62.32%	11,396	36.10%	499	1.58%	8,279	26.22%	31,570
Bedford	10,217	65.89%	5,027	32.42%	263	1.69%	5,190	33.47%	15,507
Benton	3,696	57.05%	2,645	40.82%	138	2.13%	1,051	16.23%	6,479
Bledsoe	3,166	66.18%	1,517	31.71%	101	2.11%	1,649	34.47%	4,784
Blount	35,571	68.88%	15,253	29.53%	821	1.59%	20,318	39.35%	51,645
Bradley	28,333	74.19%	9,357	24.50%	501	1.31%	18,976	49.69%	38,191
Campbell	8,535	67.59%	3,867	30.62%	226	1.79%	4,668	36.97%	12,628
Cannon	3,322	60.88%	2,011	36.85%	124	2.27%	1,311	24.03%	5,457
Carroll	7,455	64.01%	3,980	34.17%	211	1.82%	3,475	29.84%	11,646
Carter	15,852	72.82%	5,587	25.66%	330	1.52%	10,265	47.16%	21,769
Cheatham	10,702	65.14%	5,498	33.47%	228	1.39%	5,204	31.67%	16,428
Chester	4,587	71.02%	1,797	27.82%	75	1.16%	2,790	43.20%	6,459
Claiborne	7,175	68.86%	3,078	29.54%	167	1.60%	4,097	39.32%	10,420
Clay	1,676	55.98%	1,248	41.68%	70	2.34%	428	14.30%	2,994
Cocke	8,945	71.67%	3,340	26.76%	196	1.57%	5,605	44.91%	12,481
Coffee	13,250	63.73%	7,132	34.30%	408	1.97%	6,118	29.43%	20,790
Crockett	3,994	66.16%	1,967	32.58%	76	1.26%	2,027	33.58%	6,037
Cumberland	17,436	67.81%	7,889	30.68%	387	1.51%	9,547	37.13%	25,712
Davidson	102,915	38.80%	158,423	59.73%	3,885	1.47%	-55,508	-20.93%	265,223
Decatur	3,101	65.11%	1,566	32.88%	96	2.01%	1,535	32.23%	4,763
DeKalb	4,085	57.82%	2,832	40.08%	148	2.10%	1,253	17.74%	7,065
Dickson	11,677	59.82%	7,506	38.45%	336	1.73%	4,171	21.37%	19,519
Dyer	9,859	68.23%	4,411	30.53%	180	1.24%	5,448	37.70%	14,450
Fayette	12,173	63.22%	6,892	35.80%	189	0.98%	5,281	27.42%	19,254
Fentress	4,789	71.06%	1,831	27.17%	119	1.77%	2,958	43.89%	6,739
Franklin	10,539	60.46%	6,613	37.94%	280	1.60%	3,926	22.52%	17,432
Gibson	13,516	63.60%	7,406	34.85%	331	1.55%	6,110	28.75%	21,253
Giles	6,902	59.05%	4,614	39.47%	173	1.48%	2,288	19.58%	11,689
Grainger	5,297	70.60%	2,066	27.54%	140	1.86%	3,231	43.06%	7,503
Greene	17,151	69.52%	7,110	28.82%	409	1.66%	10,041	40.70%	24,670
Grundy	2,563	55.33%	1,971	42.55%	98	2.12%	592	12.78%	4,632
Hamblen	15,508	68.41%	6,807	30.03%	354	1.56%	8,701	38.38%	22,669
Hamilton	81,702	55.19%	64,246	43.40%	2,086	1.41%	17,456	11.79%	148,034
Hancock	1,588	70.86%	604	26.95%	49	2.19%	984	43.91%	2,241
Hardeman	5,225	46.50%	5,919	52.67%	93	0.83%	-694	-6.17%	11,237
Hardin	7,077	70.52%	2,794	27.84%	164	1.64%	4,283	42.68%	10,035
Hawkins	14,756	70.13%	5,930	28.18%	354	1.69%	8,826	41.95%	21,040
Haywood	3,165	38.97%	4,893	60.25%	63	0.78%	-1,728	-21.28%	8,121
Henderson	7,669	70.79%	3,021	27.88%	144	1.33%	4,648	42.91%	10,834
Henry	8,182	60.41%	5,153	38.04%	210	1.55%	3,029	22.37%	13,545
Hickman	4,784	56.30%	3,563	41.93%	151	1.77%	1,221	14.37%	8,498
Houston	1,608	47.94%	1,678	50.03%	68	2.03%	-70	-2.09%	3,354
Humphreys	3,818	50.37%	3,600	47.49%	162	2.14%	218	2.88%	7,580
Jackson	2,185	48.54%	2,224	49.41%	92	2.05%	-39	-0.87%	4,501
Jefferson	13,092	70.65%	5,178	27.94%	262	1.41%	7,914	42.71%	18,532
Johnson	4,621	70.11%	1,837	27.87%	133	2.02%	2,784	42.24%	6,591
Knox	113,015	60.73%	70,215	37.73%	2,856	1.53%	42,800	23.00%	186,086
Lake	1,175	52.50%	1,024	45.76%	39	1.74%	151	6.74%	2,238
Lauderdale	4,933	52.83%	4,322	46.28%	83	0.89%	611	6.55%	9,338
Lawrence	10,566	65.96%	5,161	32.22%	293	1.82%	5,405	33.74%	16,020
Lewis	2,951	61.05%	1,804	37.32%	79	1.63%	1,147	23.73%	4,834
Lincoln	9,231	70.30%	3,695	28.14%	204	1.56%	5,536	42.16%	13,130
Loudon	15,815	71.29%	6,058	27.31%	311	1.40%	9,757	43.98%	22,184
Macon	5,145	69.90%	2,060	27.99%	155	2.11%	3,085	41.91%	7,360
Madison	23,290	53.12%	20,209	46.09%	347	0.79%	3,081	7.03%	43,846
Marion	6,746	58.98%	4,506	39.40%	185	1.62%	2,240	19.58%	11,437
Marshall	6,755	59.84%	4,320	38.27%	214	1.89%	2,435	21.57%	11,289
Maury	20,288	60.08%	13,058	38.67%	421	1.25%	7,230	21.41%	33,767
McMinn	12,989	69.13%	5,541	29.49%	259	1.38%	7,448	39.64%	18,789
McNairy	7,135	68.46%	3,131	30.04%	156	1.50%	4,004	38.42%	10,422
Meigs	2,797	66.01%	1,372	32.38%	68	1.61%	1,425	33.63%	4,237
Monroe	11,484	68.45%	5,053	30.12%	240	1.43%	6,431	38.33%	16,777
Montgomery	30,175	53.28%	25,716	45.40%	748	1.32%	4,459	7.88%	56,639
Moore	2,010	68.09%	881	29.84%	61	2.07%	1,129	38.25%	2,952
Morgan	4,717	69.14%	1,969	28.86%	136	2.00%	2,748	40.28%	6,822
Obion	8,873	66.26%	4,308	32.17%	211	1.57%	4,565	34.09%	13,392
Overton	4,497	55.57%	3,419	42.25%	176	2.18%	1,078	13.32%	8,092
Perry	1,596	53.20%	1,329	44.30%	75	2.50%	267	8.90%	3,000
Pickett	1,786	66.87%	854	31.97%	31	1.16%	932	34.90%	2,671
Polk	4,267	65.64%	2,124	32.67%	110	1.69%	2,143	32.97%	6,501
Putnam	17,101	62.60%	9,739	35.65%	476	1.75%	7,362	26.95%	27,316
Rhea	8,042	72.41%	2,907	26.18%	157	1.41%	5,135	46.23%	11,106
Roane	15,658	67.27%	7,224	31.04%	394	1.69%	8,434	36.23%	23,276
Robertson	17,903	64.83%	9,318	33.74%	393	1.43%	8,585	31.09%	27,614
Rutherford	59,892	58.78%	40,460	39.71%	1,547	1.51%	19,432	19.07%	101,899
Scott	4,931	72.70%	1,720	25.36%	132	1.94%	3,211	47.34%	6,783
Sequatchie	3,610	66.40%	1,717	31.58%	110	2.02%	1,893	34.82%	5,437
Sevier	24,922	73.43%	8,604	25.35%	415	1.22%	16,318	48.08%	33,941
Shelby	145,458	35.96%	256,297	63.35%	2,800	0.69%	-110,839	-27.39%	404,555
Smith	4,563	58.95%	2,992	38.65%	186	2.40%	1,571	20.30%	7,741
Stewart	2,956	53.68%	2,470	44.85%	81	1.47%	486	8.83%	5,507
Sullivan	44,808	70.02%	18,354	28.68%	835	1.30%	26,454	41.34%	63,997
Sumner	44,949	66.73%	21,487	31.90%	926	1.37%	23,462	34.83%	67,362
Tipton	17,165	67.80%	7,931	31.33%	220	0.87%	9,234	36.47%	25,316
Trousdale	1,688	52.11%	1,475	45.54%	76	2.35%	213	6.57%	3,239
Unicoi	5,011	69.38%	2,107	29.17%	105	1.45%	2,904	40.21%	7,223
Union	4,467	69.81%	1,829	28.58%	103	1.61%	2,638	41.23%	6,399
Van Buren	1,294	58.66%	849	38.49%	63	2.85%	445	20.17%	2,206
Warren	8,562	59.46%	5,515	38.30%	323	2.24%	3,047	21.16%	14,400
Washington	32,341	66.03%	15,941	32.54%	700	1.43%	16,400	33.49%	48,982
Wayne	4,076	73.75%	1,355	24.52%	96	1.73%	2,721	49.23%	5,527
Weakley	8,855	64.68%	4,596	33.57%	239	1.75%	4,259	31.11%	13,690
White	6,103	63.26%	3,372	34.95%	172	1.79%	2,731	28.31%	9,647
Williamson	64,858	69.12%	27,886	29.72%	1,092	1.16%	36,972	39.40%	93,836
Wilson	34,595	67.62%	15,886	31.05%	678	1.33%	18,709	36.57%	51,159
Totals	1,479,178	56.85%	1,087,437	41.79%	35,367	1.36%	391,741	15.06%	2,601,982

Counties that flipped from Democratic to Republican

- Benton (largest municipality: Camden)
- Clay (largest municipality: Celina)
- Grundy (largest municipality: Altamont)
- Humphreys (largest municipality: Waverly)
- Lake (largest municipality: Tiptonville)
- Lauderdale (largest municipality: Ripley)
- Overton (largest municipality: Livingston)
- Perry (largest municipality: Linden)
- Smith (largest municipality: Carthage)
- Stewart (largest municipality: Dover)
- Trousdale (largest municipality: Hartsville)
- Van Buren (largest municipality: Spencer)

==== By congressional district ====
John McCain swept the state and carried seven of the state's nine congressional districts, including three districts held by Democrats. Barack Obama carried the state's two congressional districts anchored by the two largest cities of Memphis and Nashville.

District	McCain	Obama	Representative
1st	69.77%	28.77%	David Davis (110th Congress)
1st	69.77%	28.77%	Phil Roe (111th Congress)
2nd	64.21%	34.28%	John J. Duncan Jr.
3rd	61.87%	36.86%	Zach Wamp
4th	64.06%	34.25%	Lincoln Davis
5th	42.94%	55.85%	Jim Cooper
6th	61.87%	36.59%	Bart Gordon
7th	64.76%	34.29%	Marsha Blackburn
8th	56.01%	42.73%	John S. Tanner
9th	22.51%	76.92%	Steve Cohen

== Electors ==
Technically the voters of Tennessee cast their ballots for electors: representatives to the Electoral College. Tennessee is allocated 11 electors because it has 9 congressional districts and 2 senators. All candidates who appear on the ballot or qualify to receive write-in votes must submit a list of 11 electors, who pledge to vote for their candidate and his or her running mate. Whoever wins the majority of votes in the state is awarded all 11 electoral votes. Their chosen electors then vote for president and vice president. Although electors are pledged to their candidate and running mate, they are not obligated to vote for them. An elector who votes for someone other than his or her candidate is known as a faithless elector.

The electors of each state and the District of Columbia met on December 15, 2008, to cast their votes for president and vice president. The Electoral College itself never meets as one body. Instead the electors from each state and the District of Columbia met in their respective capitols.

The following were the members of the Electoral College from the state. All 11 were pledged to John McCain and Sarah Palin:

1. Sara Sellers
2. Jim Haslam
3. Wayne Cropp
4. Lisa Wheeler
5. Beth Campbell
6. Albert McCall
7. Shirley Curry
8. Marilucile Counce
9. Colin Richmond
10. Winfield Dunn
11. Chrystal Horn

== Analysis ==
Despite narrowly voting for Bill Clinton in 1992 and 1996 when former Tennessee Senator Al Gore was on the ticket as Vice President, the state, along with neighboring Arkansas has steadily been trending Republican since then. George W. Bush narrowly carried the state in 2000 over Gore and easily won in 2004 over John Kerry.

A handful of Tennessean counties—including those that hadn't voted Republican since landslide victors Reagan or Nixon were on the ballot, swung dramatically Republican. For example, Grundy County, in southeastern Tennessee, broke 56%-42% for John Kerry in 2004, but wound up being swept by McCain 55%-42% this year. The state was one of five states that swung even more Republican in 2008 with John McCain soundly defeating Barack Obama in Tennessee. 2008 marked the first time since 1960 whereby the state was carried by the losing presidential candidate. A possible factor to Tennessee ironically swinging rightward—despite the national Democratic trend—could be the state favoring Hillary Clinton, former First Lady of neighboring Arkansas, over Barack Obama in the Democratic primary, as was the case in Arkansas itself.

McCain won both East Tennessee and Middle Tennessee by landslide margins. Historically, East Tennessee, which is a part of Appalachia, is one of the few ancestrally Republican areas of the South. Most of its residents strongly opposed secession during the Civil War. They identified with the GOP after the return of peace and have remained in the Republican fold through good times and bad ever since. Some of the region's counties are among the few in the country to have never supported a Democrat for president.

However, Middle Tennessee has Democratic roots based on liberal economic policies, most famously Franklin D. Roosevelt's Tennessee Valley Authority. Middle Tennessee voted strongly for Bill Clinton of neighboring Arkansas, but Middle Tennessee native Al Gore narrowly lost the region in 2000—a loss that ultimately cost him Tennessee, and the election. In contrast, it was one of the few regions in the country which voted more Republican than in 2004. This is largely due to a growing social conservative trend in the region, particularly in the Nashville suburbs; some of the most politically active churches in the state are located there.

On the other hand, Barack Obama did improve relatively well upon John Kerry's performances in the traditionally Democratic cities of Nashville and Memphis. In the former, support amongst progressive whites led to a 3–2 victory for Obama in Davidson County. In Memphis, heavy African American turnout ensured him the largest margin in the state in Shelby County, although far from enough to outweigh his losses everywhere else in the state. McCain carried Hamilton County and Knox County, home to Chattanooga and Knoxville, the two largest cities in East Tennessee.

During the same election, at the state level, Republicans picked up four seats in the Tennessee House of Representatives and three seats in the Tennessee Senate to obtain control of both chambers of the state legislature for the first time since Reconstruction.

== See also ==
- Presidency of Barack Obama
- 2008 Tennessee elections
- 2008 United States elections
