= Madie, Tennessee =

Unincorporated community in Tennessee, US

Coordinates: 36°16′54″N 89°27′41″W

Madie is an unincorporated community to the northeast of Ridgely, Tennessee, in Lake County, Tennessee, United States.
