= Wynnburg, Tennessee =

- Census-designated place
- Location within Tennessee Location within the United States
- Coordinates: 36°19′43″N 89°28′24″W
- Country: United States
- State: Tennessee
- County: Lake

Area
  - Total: 1.16 sq mi (3.00 km^{2})
  - Land: 1.16 sq mi (3.00 km^{2})
  - Water: 0 sq mi (0.00 km^{2})
- Elevation: 289 ft (88 m)

Population (2020)
  - Total: 91
  - Density: 78.6/sq mi (30.36/km^{2})
- Time zone: UTC-6 (Central (CST))
  - Summer (DST): UTC-5 (CDT)
- ZIP code: 38077
- Area code: 731
- GNIS feature ID: 1275211

Wynnburg is an unincorporated community and census-designated place (CDP) in Lake County, Tennessee, United States. Its ZIP code is 38077.

The post office in Wynnburg started operations in 1910.

== Demographics ==
Historical population
Census	Pop.	Note	%±
2020	91		—
U.S. Decennial Census
