= Lake Isom =

Lake in Lake County, Tennessee, United States

Lake Isom National Wildlife Refuge
- IUCN category IV (habitat/species management area)
- Location within the United States
- Location: Lake County, Tennessee, United States
- Nearest city: Tiptonville, Tennessee
- Coordinates: 36°17′59″N 89°25′09″W
- Area: 1,846 acres (7.47 km^{2})
- Established: 1938
- Governing body: U.S. Fish and Wildlife Service
- Website: www.fws.gov/refuge/lake-isom

Lake Isom is a small natural lake located in Lake County, Tennessee immediately south of Reelfoot Lake. It is fed by Running Reelfoot Bayou, the outlet stream of Reelfoot Lake. Like Reelfoot, it was formed in the 1811–1812 New Madrid earthquakes and it is very shallow and swampy. The entire lake and its environs, covering 1,846 acres (747 ha) comprise the Lake Isom National Wildlife Refuge and have been such since 1938.

Lake Isom has suffered from considerable siltation in the past, making it even shallower and swampier than it already was. Improved agricultural practices in the area are slowing this development, however.

Due to the long-term federal ownership and its smaller size, Lake Isom is almost entirely undeveloped and is not surrounded with parks, restaurants, and hunting and fishing camps as is Reelfoot. Motors on boats on the lake are also limited to 10 horsepower.
