= Walnut Log, Tennessee =

Unincorporated community in Tennessee, US

Coordinates: 36.468°N 89.316°W

Walnut Log is a rural unincorporated community along State Route 157, in Obion County, Tennessee.

== Popular culture ==
It is referenced in the Irvin S. Cobb short story "Fishhead".
