= Jerry Reese =

American football player and coach (born 1963)

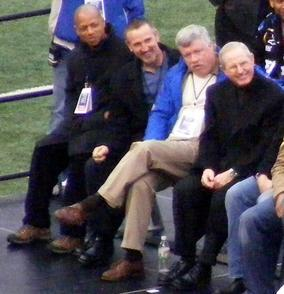
- Reese (far left) with the 2007 Super Bowl champion coaching staff: defensive coordinator Steve Spagnuolo, offensive coordinator Kevin Gilbride, and head coach Tom Coughlin at Giants Stadium

Personal information
- Born: July 22, 1963 (age 63); Tiptonville, Tennessee, U.S.

Career information
- College: University of Tennessee at Martin

Career history
- UT-Martin (1986–1993) Assistant coach; New York Giants (1994–1997) College scout; New York Giants (1997–2004) Pro scout; New York Giants (2004–2007) Director of player personnel; New York Giants (2007–2017) General manager

Awards and highlights
- 2× Super Bowl champion (XLII, XLVI)
- Executive profile at Pro Football Reference

Jerry Reese (born July 22, 1963) is a former American football executive, player, and coach. He was a member of the New York Giants for 23 years, serving as their general manager from 2007 to 2017 where he won two Super Bowls. He was inducted into the Tennessee Sports Hall of Fame in 2009.

== Early life and career ==
Reese is a native of Tiptonville, Tennessee, where he played for the Lake County Falcons' 1980 state champion 1-A high school football team. He played for the University of Tennessee at Martin where he was later an assistant coach before taking a job as a scout for the New York Giants. From 2002 until becoming general manager in 2007, he was the director of player personnel for the Giants.

== Executive career ==
=== New York Giants ===
Reese succeeded Ernie Accorsi as general manager on January 16, 2007. He participated in the Giants' success in the 2007 NFL draft, which included the selections of Aaron Ross, Steve Smith, Jay Alford, Kevin Boss, Michael Johnson, Ahmad Bradshaw, and Zak DeOssie. Some of them played important roles in the Giants' Super Bowl XLII victory. Prior to the start of Giants mini-camp in May 2008, Reese and the Giants were invited by President George W. Bush to the White House to honor their Super Bowl victory.

During his first five seasons as General Manager (2007-2011), the Giants amassed a 49-31 record, with three playoff appearances. Reese had his second Super Bowl victory in 2011 when the Giants won Super Bowl XLVI over the Patriots.

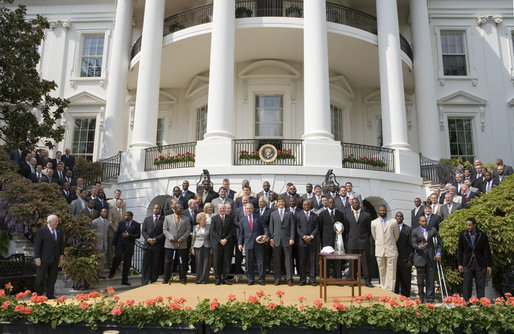
The Giants organization pictured in front of the White House on April 30, 2008.

=== Later Giants career ===
Following the Giants' Super Bowl XLVI win, the team sputtered. Over the next six seasons, the team went 42-54 while making just one postseason appearance, losing to the Green Bay Packers in the 2016 NFC Wild Card Game. Following the 2015 season, the Giants fired longtime head coach Tom Coughlin and replaced him with Ben McAdoo, who had spent the previous two years as offensive coordinator. After a 11–5 finish in 2016, the 2017 Giants were marred by numerous player injuries and other known controversies.

Reese was criticized during his final years for failing to fix numerous team problems, including a poor offensive line and a lackluster rushing attack (having had just one thousand-yard rusher since 2010). Reese was also criticized for poor draft picks during the later years of his tenure. Examples include drafting Ereck Flowers and Eli Apple in the 2015 and 2016 drafts, respectively, as both failed to meet expectations and were off the Giants roster by 2019.

After a 2–10 record to start the 2017 season, Reese was fired by the Giants, after serving 23 years in the front office, along with the firing of head coach Ben McAdoo. During Reese's tenure, the Giants had a regular season record of 90–82, and a postseason record of 8–2.

== Personal life ==
Reese is married to Gwen Moore. They have two children, Jasmyne Danielle and Jerry II. He resides in Jefferson Township, New Jersey, where his son J.R. played quarterback for the Jefferson Township High School football team.
