= 2008 Tennessee elections =

Tennessee state elections in 2008 were held on Tuesday, November 4, 2008. Primary elections for the United States Senate, United States House of Representatives, Tennessee Senate, and Tennessee House of Representatives, as well as various judicial retention elections, including elections for two Tennessee Supreme Court justices, were held on August 7, 2008.

== Presidential election ==
=== President of the United States ===
Final results by county: McCain: 50–60%; 60–70%; 70–80%; Obama: 40–50%; 50–60%; 60–70%

In 2008, Tennessee had 11 electoral votes in the Electoral College at the time. In the general election, Republican candidate John McCain won the state with 56.85% of the vote to Democratic candidate Obama's 41.79%.

The presidential primaries were held on February 5, 2008. Mike Huckabee won Tennessee's Republican primary over Senator John McCain of Arizona. Former first lady Hillary Clinton defeated Senator Barack Obama of Illinois in the Tennessee Democratic primary.

=== Results ===
United States presidential election in Tennessee, 2008
Party	Candidate	Running mate	Votes	Percentage	Electoral votes
Republican	John McCain	Sarah Palin	1,479,178	56.85%	11
Democratic	Barack Obama	Joe Biden	1,087,437	41.79%	0
Independent	Ralph Nader	Matt Gonzalez	11,560	0.44%	0
Libertarian	Bob Barr	Wayne Allyn Root	8,547	0.33%	0
Constitution	Chuck Baldwin	Darrell Castle	8,191	0.31%	0
Green	Cynthia McKinney	Rosa Clemente	2,499	0.10%	0
Write-ins	Write-ins	Write-ins	2,333	0.09%	0
Socialist	Brian Moore	Stewart Alexander	1,326	0.05%	0
Boston Tea	Charles Jay	Thomas Knapp	1,011	0.04%	0
Totals			2,601,982	100.00%	11
Voter turnout (Voting age population)					55.5%

=== February 5, 2008, Primary Results ===
2008 Tennessee Democratic presidential primary
- February 5, 2008

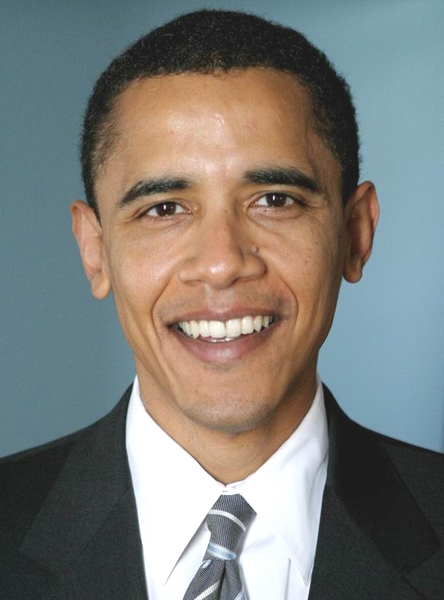
Candidate	Hillary Clinton	Barack Obama
Home state	New York	Illinois
Delegate count	40	28
Popular vote	336,245	254,874
Percentage	53.82%	40.48%
- Primary results by county Clinton: 40–50% 50–60% 60–70% 70–80% 80–90% Obama: 40–50% 50–60% 60–70%

Key:	Withdrew prior to contest

Democratic Primary Presidential Preference
Candidate	Votes	Percentage	National delegates
Hillary Clinton	336,245	53.82%	40
Barack Obama	254,874	40.48%	28
John Edwards	27,820	4.45%	0
Joe Biden	1,531	0.25%	0
Bill Richardson	1,178	0.19%	0
Dennis Kucinich	971	0.16%	0
Christopher Dodd	526	0.08%	0
Mike Gravel	461	0.07%	0
Uncommitted	3,158	0.51%	0
Totals	624,764	100.00%	68

2008 Tennessee Republican presidential primary
- February 5, 2008

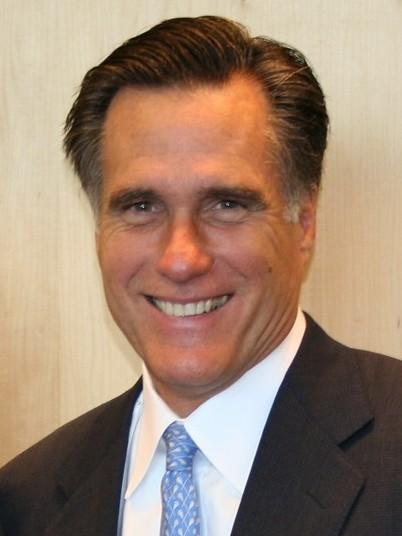

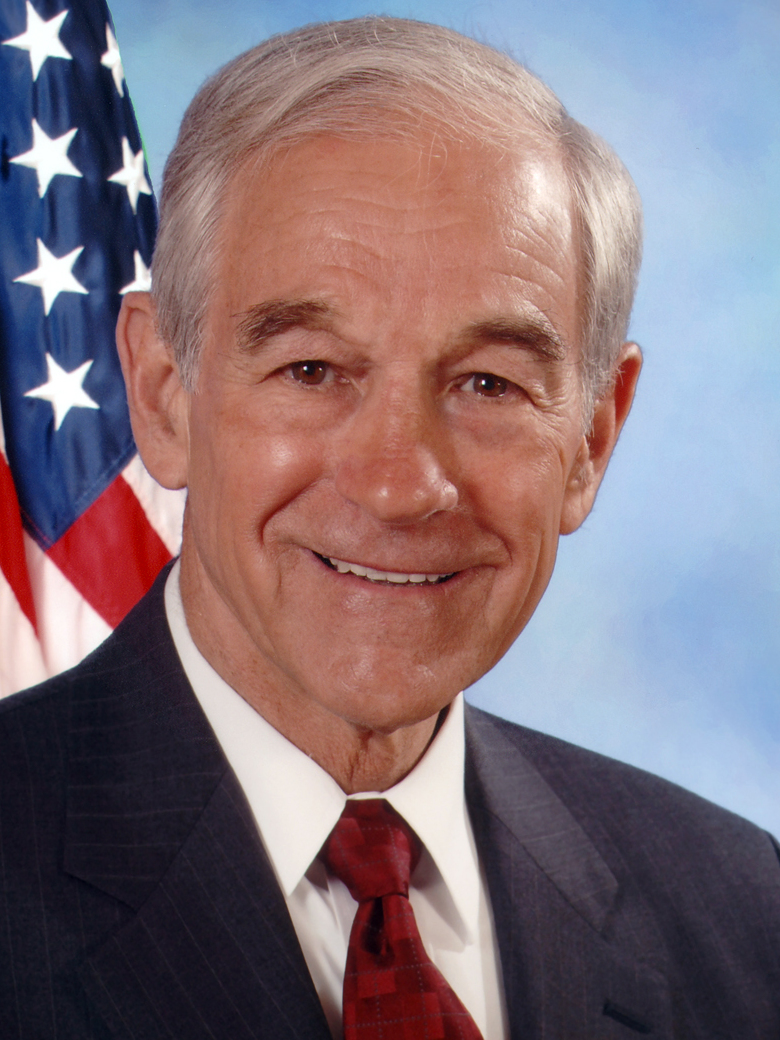
Candidate	Mike Huckabee	John McCain	Mitt Romney
Home state	Arkansas	Arizona	Massachusetts
Delegate count	25	19	8
Popular vote	190,904	176,091	130,632
Percentage	34.37%	31.84%	23.62%
Candidate	Ron Paul
Home state	Texas
Delegate count	0
Popular vote	31,026
Percentage	5.61%

Huckabee
McCain
Romney
Huckabee
30 – 40%
40 – 50%
50 – 60%
McCain
30 – 40%
40 – 50%
Romney
30 – 40%

Republican Presidential Primary
Candidate	Votes	Percentage	Delegates
Mike Huckabee	190,904	34.37%	25
John McCain	176,091	31.84%	19
Mitt Romney	130,632	23.62%	8
Ron Paul	31,026	5.61%	0
Fred Thompson*	16,263	2.94%	0
Rudy Giuliani*	5,159	0.93%	0
Alan Keyes	978	0.18%	0
Duncan Hunter*	738	0.13%	0
Tom Tancredo*	194	0.03%	0
Uncommitted	1,830	0.33%	0
Total	553,005	100%	52

* Candidate dropped out of the race before the primary

== United States Congress ==
=== Senate ===
Final results by county: Alexander: 40–50%; 50–60%; 60–70%; 70–80%; 80–90%; Tuke: 50–60%

Incumbent Republican U.S. Senator Lamar Alexander won re-election to a second term, with 65.1% of the vote against Democrat Bob Tuke, who won just 32.6%.

=== Results ===
United States Senate election in Tennessee, 2008
Party	Candidate	Votes	%	±%
Republican	Lamar Alexander (Incumbent)	1,579,477	65.14%	+10.87%
Democratic	Bob Tuke	767,236	31.64%	−12.69%
Independent	Edward L. Buck	31,631	1.30%	N/A
Independent	Christopher G. Fenner	11,073	0.46%	N/A
Independent	Daniel Towers Lewis	9,367	0.39%	N/A
Independent	Chris Lugo	9,170	0.38%	N/A
Independent	Ed Lawhorn	8,986	0.37%	N/A
Independent	David Gatchell	7,645	0.32%	N/A
Majority		812,241	33.50%	+23.56%
Turnout		2,424,585	66.34%	
Republican hold		Swing		

August 7, 2008, Primary Results

Democratic Party primary results
Party	Candidate	Votes	%
Democratic	Bob Tuke	59,050	32.21%
Democratic	Gary G. Davis	39,119	21.34%
Democratic	Mike Padgett	33,471	18.26%
Democratic	Mark E. Clayton	32,309	17.62%
Democratic	Kenneth Eaton	14,702	8.02%
Democratic	Leonard D. Ladner	4,697	2.55%
Total votes		183,348	100.00%

Republican Party primary results
Party	Candidate	Votes	%
Republican	Lamar Alexander (Incumbent)	244,222	100.00%
Total votes		244,222	100.00%

=== House of Representatives ===
District results: Republican: 60–70%; 70–80%; Democratic: 50–60%; 60–70%; 70–80%; 80–90%; >90%

Tennessee elected nine U.S. representatives, each representing one of Tennessee's nine congressional districts.

=== Results ===
District	Incumbent	Party	First elected	Results	Candidates
Tennessee 1	David Davis	Republican	2006	Incumbent lost renomination. New member elected. Republican hold.	▌ ✓ Phil Roe (Republican) 71.8%; ▌Rob Russell (Democratic) 24.5%; ▌Joel Goodman (Independent) 1.7%; ▌James Reeves (Independent) 1.1%; ▌Thomas Owens (Independent) 0.8%
Tennessee 2	Jimmy Duncan	Republican	1998	Incumbent re-elected.	▌ ✓ Jimmy Duncan (Republican) 78.1%; ▌Bob Scott (Democratic) 21.9%
Tennessee 3	Zach Wamp	Republican	1994	Incumbent re-elected.	▌ ✓ Zach Wamp (Republican) 69.4%; ▌Doug Vandagriff (Democratic) 27.4%; ▌Jean Howard-Hill (Independent) 1.8%; ▌Ed Choate (Independent) 1.4%
Tennessee 4	Lincoln Davis	Democratic	2002	Incumbent re-elected.	▌ ✓ Lincoln Davis (Democratic) 58.8%; ▌Monty Lankford (Republican) 37.8%; ▌James Anthony Gray (Independent) 1.9%; ▌Kevin Ragsdale (Independent) 1.5%
Tennessee 5	Jim Cooper	Democratic	1982; 1994 (retired); 2002	Incumbent re-elected.	▌ ✓ Jim Cooper (Democratic) 65.9%; ▌Gerard Donovan (Republican) 31.0%; ▌Jon Jackson (Independent) 2.0%; ▌John Miglietta (Green) 1.2%
Tennessee 6	Bart Gordon	Democratic	1984	Incumbent re-elected.	▌ ✓ Bart Gordon (Democratic) 74.4%; ▌Chris Baker (Independent) 25.6%
Tennessee 7	Marsha Blackburn	Republican	2002	Incumbent re-elected.	▌ ✓ Marsha Blackburn (Republican) 68.6%; ▌Randy Morris (Democratic) 31.4%
Tennessee 8	John Tanner	Democratic	1988	Incumbent re-elected.	▌ ✓ John Tanner (Democratic) Uncontested
Tennessee 9	Steve Cohen	Democratic	2006	Incumbent re-elected.	▌ ✓ Steve Cohen (Democratic) 87.9%; ▌Jake Ford (Independent) 4.9%; ▌Dewey Clark (Independent) 4.4%; ▌Mary Wright (Independent) 2.8%

Popular vote
Democratic	51.94%
Republican	42.47%
Other	5.59%

House seats
Democratic	55.56%
Republican	44.44%

== State legislature ==
=== State Senate ===
Results by senate districts

Winners:

Republican hold
Democratic hold
Republican gain
No election

Elections for 16 of the 33 seats in Tennessee's State Senate were held on November 4, 2008.

After this election, Republicans had 19 seats while Democrats had 14 seats, with Republicans gaining three seats, fully flipping the senate.

=== State House of Representatives ===
Results by State House districts

Winners:

Republican hold
Democratic hold
Republican gain
Democratic gain

The election of all 99 seats in the Tennessee House of Representatives occurred on November 4, 2008.

Republicans won 50 seats, while Democrats won 49 seats. Republicans gained four seats, flipping the house during this election.

== Supreme Court ==
=== Retention elections (August 7, 2008) ===
All incumbent Tennessee Supreme Court Justices won their retention elections, getting eight more years.

Tennessee Supreme Court Associate Justice, William C. Koch Jr. retention election
Choice	Votes	%
For	295,754	76.15
Against	92,632	23.85
Total	388,386	100.00

Tennessee Supreme Court Associate Justice, Gary R. Wade retention election
Choice	Votes	%
For	296,645	77.08
Against	88,193	22.92
Total	384,838	100.00

== See also ==
- Elections in Tennessee
- Political party strength in Tennessee
- Tennessee Democratic Party
- Tennessee Republican Party
- Government of Tennessee
- Tennessee Supreme Court
- 2008 United States elections
