= Lake County, Tennessee =

County in Tennessee, United States

- County
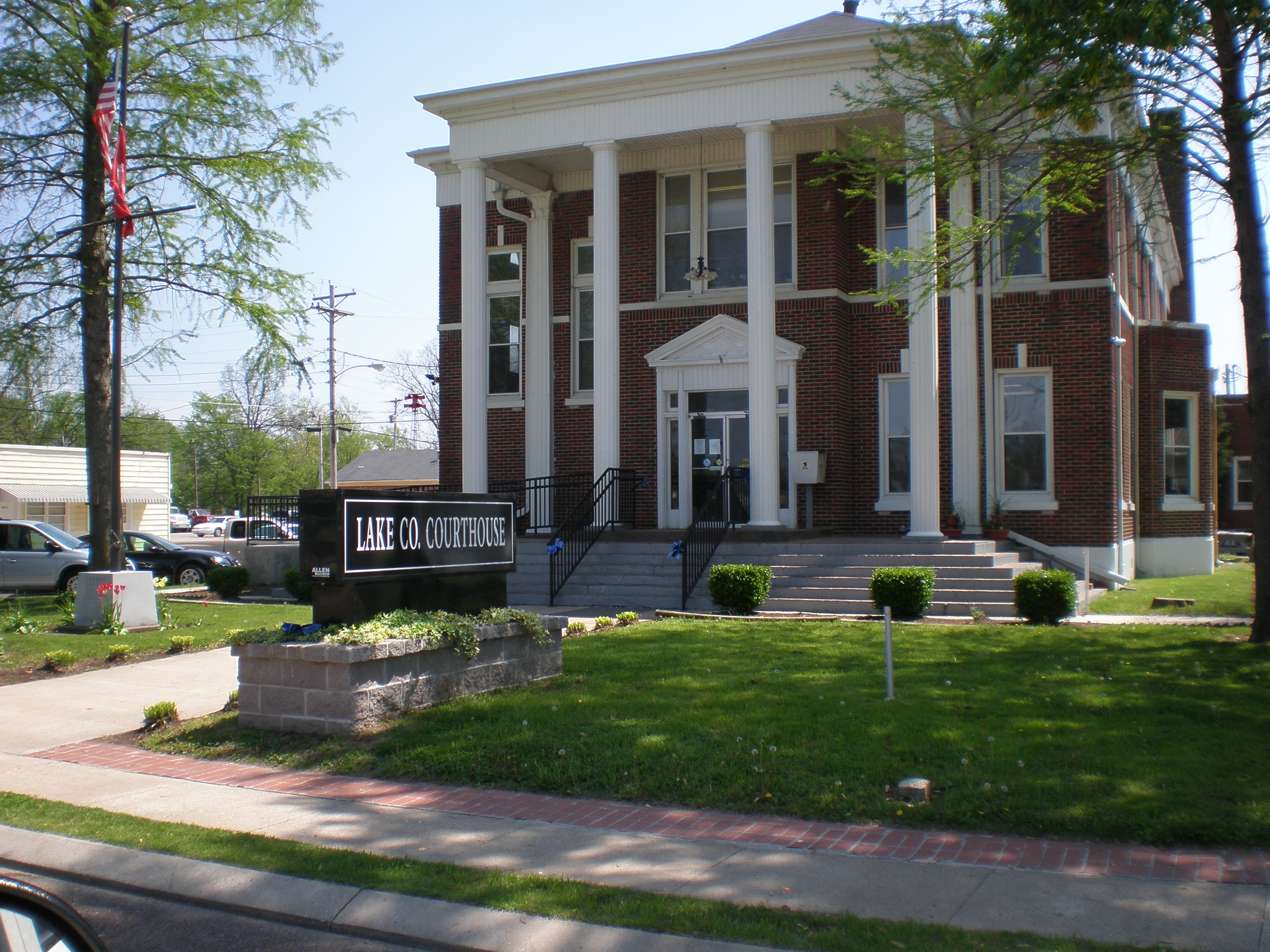
- Lake County Courthouse in Tiptonville

- Location within the U.S. state of Tennessee
- Coordinates: 36°20′N 89°29′W
- Country: United States
- State: Tennessee
- Founded: 1870
- Named for: Reelfoot Lake
- Seat: Tiptonville
- Largest town: Tiptonville

Area
  - Total: 194 sq mi (500 km^{2})
  - Land: 166 sq mi (430 km^{2})
  - Water: 28 sq mi (73 km^{2}) 14%

Population (2020)
  - Total: 7,005
  - Estimate (2025): 6,249 ▼
  - Density: 47/sq mi (18/km^{2})
- Time zone: UTC−6 (Central)
  - Summer (DST): UTC−5 (CDT)
- Congressional district: 8th
- Website: lakecountytn.gov

Lake County is a county located in the northwest corner of the U.S. state of Tennessee. As of the 2020 census, the population was 7,005, making it the fifth-least populous county in Tennessee. Its county seat is Tiptonville. It shares a border with Kentucky to the north and is separated from Missouri to the west by the Mississippi River.

Reelfoot Lake, formed after the New Madrid earthquakes in the early 19th century, occupies much of the northern part of the county. Issues of control of the lake and the development of cotton plantations in this part of the county resulted in violence by local farmers against corporate owners in 1908; the state called in the militia to suppress night riding. Reelfoot Lake and surrounding property were finally acquired by the state beginning in 1914. It is now within the Reelfoot Lake State Park and preserved for public use. The Northwest Correctional Complex in Tiptonville, a state prison first opened in 1981, can house up to 2,391 male prisoners, a significant share of the county's population.

== History ==
The history of Lake County has been largely defined by Reelfoot Lake, a natural lake created by the New Madrid earthquakes of 1811 and 1812. It is surrounded by wetlands. This territory was originally included in Obion County.

In 1862, during the Civil War, the Battle of Island Number Ten took place in the Mississippi River, just off the shores of Obion County, in territory now part of Lake County.

The county was organized in 1870, during the Reconstruction era. Its residents had long complained about the difficulty of having to traverse swampy areas during seasonal high waters around Reelfoot Lake to reach the county seat, then Troy, Tennessee, located to the east of the lake. After the new Lake County was established, Tiptonville was designated as its county seat. The first session of court was held on September 5, 1870.

In 1907 and 1908, a violent conflict took place in Lake and Obion counties, and neighboring Fulton County, Kentucky, which also had frontage on the lake. Private investors bought title to most of the land around the lake, gaining control, and formed the West Tennessee Land Company, to develop the property. In this era, western Tennessee and Kentucky were being developed for cotton culture and the lowlands around the lake were fertile floodplain. They announced plans to drain the lake. A band of local farmers and others who made their living from the lake, organized resistance, becoming known as the "Night Riders of Reelfoot Lake."

Beginning with the burning of John Carlos Burdick's fish docks on April 12, 1908, they committed crimes over a period of months, harassing the land company's employees. In October 1908 they kidnapped two attorneys and lynched one, Quentin Rankin, who was also a shareholder in the land company. The other escaped. Given this attack and murder, Governor Malcolm Patterson personally led the Tennessee National Guard into the area, and arrested hundreds of suspected Night Riders. The Night Riders also rode against African Americans, as they were resisting the increase of blacks in the counties, some of whom had come to work as sharecroppers on newly developed cotton plantations. Since the late 19th century, the white-dominated legislature had passed Jim Crow laws and increasing restrictions on voters.

The state gained title to Reelfoot Lake in 1914 to preserve it for public use, but actions were tied up for some years in court challenges. To prevent private development from restricting its use, in 1925 Governor Austin Peay designated the lake as a hunting and fishing reserve. This was the precedent for the larger area to be preserved as the modern Reelfoot Lake State Park.

From 1877 to 1950, there were 13 lynchings of blacks in Lake County, the third-highest number in the state. Neighboring Obion County had 18 lynchings. These were high rates for counties with relatively small populations; Shelby County had the highest total, 20 lynchings in that period. Most of these murders were committed in the decades around the turn of the century, during the period of heightened violence related to opposition to corporate control of Reelfoot Lake and the introduction of cotton plantations and African-American workers to this area.

== Geography ==
According to the U.S. Census Bureau, the county has a total area of 194 square miles (500 km^{2}), of which 166 square miles (430 km^{2}) is land and 28 square miles (73 km^{2}) (14%) is water. It is the fifth-smallest county in Tennessee by area.

=== Adjacent counties ===
- Fulton County, Kentucky (north)
- Obion County (east)
- Dyer County (south)
- Pemiscot County, Missouri (west)
- New Madrid County, Missouri (northwest)

=== National protected areas ===
- Lake Isom National Wildlife Refuge
- Reelfoot National Wildlife Refuge (part)

=== State protected areas ===
- Reelfoot Lake State Natural Area (part)
- Reelfoot Lake State Park (part)
- Tumbleweed Wildlife Management Area (part)

== Demographics ==
From 1950 to 1990 the population declined noticeably, as many African Americans moved to cities or to the West Coast in the Great Migration of the second half of the 20th century.

Historical population
Census	Pop.	Note	%±
1870	2,428		—
1880	3,968		63.4%
1890	5,304		33.7%
1900	7,368		38.9%
1910	8,704		18.1%
1920	9,075		4.3%
1930	10,486		15.5%
1940	11,235		7.1%
1950	11,655		3.7%
1960	9,572		−17.9%
1970	7,896		−17.5%
1980	7,455		−5.6%
1990	7,129		−4.4%
2000	7,954		11.6%
2010	7,832		−1.5%
2020	7,005		−10.6%
2025 (est.)	6,249	▼	−10.8%
U.S. Decennial Census; 1790–1960 1900–1990; 1990–2000 2010–2020 2020

=== 2020 census ===
Lake County racial composition
Race	Num.	Perc.
White (non-Hispanic)	4,755	67.88%
Black or African American (non-Hispanic)	1,832	26.15%
Native American	15	0.21%
Asian	12	0.17%
Pacific Islander	5	0.07%
Other/Mixed	211	3.01%
Hispanic or Latino	175	2.5%

As of the 2020 census, there were 7,005 people, 2,176 households, and 1,498 families residing in the county. The median age was 42.9 years, with 14.8% of residents under the age of 18 and 16.9% of residents 65 years of age or older. For every 100 females there were 164.8 males, and for every 100 females age 18 and over there were 181.9 males age 18 and over.

The racial makeup of the county was 68.9% White, 26.2% Black or African American, 0.3% American Indian and Alaska Native, 0.2% Asian, 0.1% Native Hawaiian and Pacific Islander, 1.1% from some other race, and 3.3% from two or more races. Hispanic or Latino residents of any race comprised 2.5% of the population.

Less than 0.1% of residents lived in urban areas, while 100.0% lived in rural areas.

There were 2,176 households in the county, of which 28.6% had children under the age of 18 living in them. Of all households, 33.8% were married-couple households, 20.7% were households with a male householder and no spouse or partner present, and 38.9% were households with a female householder and no spouse or partner present. About 36.3% of all households were made up of individuals and 16.9% had someone living alone who was 65 years of age or older.

There were 2,500 housing units, of which 13.0% were vacant. Among occupied housing units, 54.5% were owner-occupied and 45.5% were renter-occupied. The homeowner vacancy rate was 2.3% and the rental vacancy rate was 7.2%.

=== 2000 census ===
As of the census of 2000, there were 7,954 people, 2,410 households, and 1,614 families residing in the county. The population density was 49 people per square mile (19 people/km^{2}). There were 2,716 housing units at an average density of 17 units per square mile (6.6/km^{2}).

The racial makeup of the county was 66.63% White, 31.19% Black or African American, 0.39% Native American, 0.14% Asian, 0.62% from other races, and 1.03% from two or more races. 1.37% of the population were Hispanic or Latino of any race.

There were 2,410 households, out of which 28.80% had children under the age of 18 living with them, 47.20% were married couples living together, 16.30% had a female householder with no husband present, and 33.00% were non-families. 30.00% of all households were made up of individuals, and 15.50% had someone living alone who was 65 years of age or older. The average household size was 2.36 and the average family size was 2.92.

In the county, the population was spread out, with 17.70% under the age of 18, 13.70% from 18 to 24, 33.80% from 25 to 44, 21.50% from 45 to 64, and 13.30% who were 65 years of age or older. The median age was 36 years. For every 100 females there were 151.00 males. For every 100 females age 18 and over, there were 163.40 males.

The median income for a household in the county was $21,995, and the median income for a family was $30,339. Males had a median income of $25,082 versus $18,700 for females. The per capita income for the county was $10,794. About 19.90% of families and 23.60% of the population were below the poverty line, including 35.10% of those under age 18 and 25.10% of those age 65 or over.

== Media ==
=== Radio stations ===
- WTNV FM 97.3
- KMIS-AM 1050

=== Newspaper ===
- The Lake County Banner

== Education ==
- Lake County High School (9–12)
- Lara Kendall Elementary School (3–8)
- Margaret Newton Elementary School (K–2)

== Communities ==
=== Towns ===
- Ridgely
- Tiptonville (county seat)

=== Census-designated place ===
- Wynnburg

=== Unincorporated communities ===
- Blue Bank
- Madie
- Wynnburg
- Magnolia Beach

== Reelfoot Lake State Park ==
The eastern half of the county sits mostly in Reelfoot Lake State Park, a 280-acre recreational area with sections for boating, hunting, fishing, and bird watching. A yearly highlight is watching Bald Eagles nest in the park.

== Politics ==
Prior to 2008, Lake County was a Democratic Party stronghold in presidential elections. During the period between 1880 and 2004 it only failed to back that party's presidential candidates in 1968 and 1972. Since then, the county has become increasingly Republican, with Hillary Clinton failing to even crack thirty percent of the county's vote despite her husband Bill Clinton winning over sixty percent in 1992 and 1996.

United States presidential election results for Lake County, Tennessee
Year	Republican		Democratic		Third party(ies)	
Year	No.	%	No.	%	No.	%
1912	122	18.35%	499	75.04%	44	6.62%
1916	130	14.96%	727	83.66%	12	1.38%
1920	352	22.68%	1,192	76.80%	8	0.52%
1924	87	9.53%	817	89.49%	9	0.99%
1928	166	14.74%	960	85.26%	0	0.00%
1932	78	4.10%	1,824	95.90%	0	0.00%
1936	113	3.04%	3,604	96.88%	3	0.08%
1940	213	6.68%	2,962	92.94%	12	0.38%
1944	150	9.43%	1,440	90.57%	0	0.00%
1948	179	11.92%	833	55.46%	490	32.62%
1952	487	24.66%	1,475	74.68%	13	0.66%
1956	512	22.80%	1,673	74.49%	61	2.72%
1960	732	34.03%	1,346	62.58%	73	3.39%
1964	736	30.63%	1,667	69.37%	0	0.00%
1968	409	16.99%	737	30.61%	1,262	52.41%
1972	1,147	65.69%	536	30.70%	63	3.61%
1976	591	23.19%	1,933	75.83%	25	0.98%
1980	823	32.11%	1,718	67.03%	22	0.86%
1984	878	41.97%	1,191	56.93%	23	1.10%
1988	806	46.06%	935	53.43%	9	0.51%
1992	680	29.49%	1,449	62.84%	177	7.68%
1996	589	29.72%	1,273	64.23%	120	6.05%
2000	781	35.12%	1,419	63.80%	24	1.08%
2004	1,039	43.84%	1,317	55.57%	14	0.59%
2008	1,175	52.50%	1,024	45.76%	39	1.74%
2012	1,163	55.73%	884	42.36%	40	1.92%
2016	1,357	68.88%	577	29.29%	36	1.83%
2020	1,492	73.35%	526	25.86%	16	0.79%
2024	1,493	77.00%	429	22.12%	17	0.88%

== See also ==
- National Register of Historic Places listings in Lake County, Tennessee
