= Bob Tuke =

American politician (born 1947)

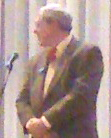

Personal details
- Born: Robert Dudley Tuke; December 5, 1947 (age 78) Rochester, New York, U.S.
- Party: Democratic
- Spouse: Susan
- Education: University of Virginia, Vanderbilt University
- Profession: attorney

Robert Dudley Tuke (born December 5, 1947, Rochester, New York) was the Democratic nominee for the 2008 United States Senate election in Tennessee, having won the Democratic primary in August. He faced incumbent Republican Lamar Alexander in the general election in November, losing by approximately 33% of the final vote.

== Life ==
Tuke served in the United States Marine and led a combined force in Vietnam during the Vietnam War. He led the Veterans for Kerry campaign for Tennessee in 2004. Tuke was elected chairman of the Democratic Party of Tennessee on June 18, 2005, serving for two years. He also served as Barack Obama's Presidential campaign chair in Tennessee.

Tuke earned his bachelor's degree from the University of Virginia in Charlottesville. He is also a graduate of Vanderbilt University, where he received his Juris Doctor. As of 2008, Tuke is a partner at the Nashville law firm of Trauger and Tuke. Tuke is married to Susan Cummins Tuke; the couple have two grown children, Andrew and Sarah.

== See also ==
- United States Senate election in Tennessee, 2008

Party political offices
Preceded by Bob Clement	Democratic Party nominee for United States Senator from Tennessee (Class 2); 2008	Succeeded by Gordon Ball
