= Reelfoot Lake State Park =

State park in Tennessee, United States

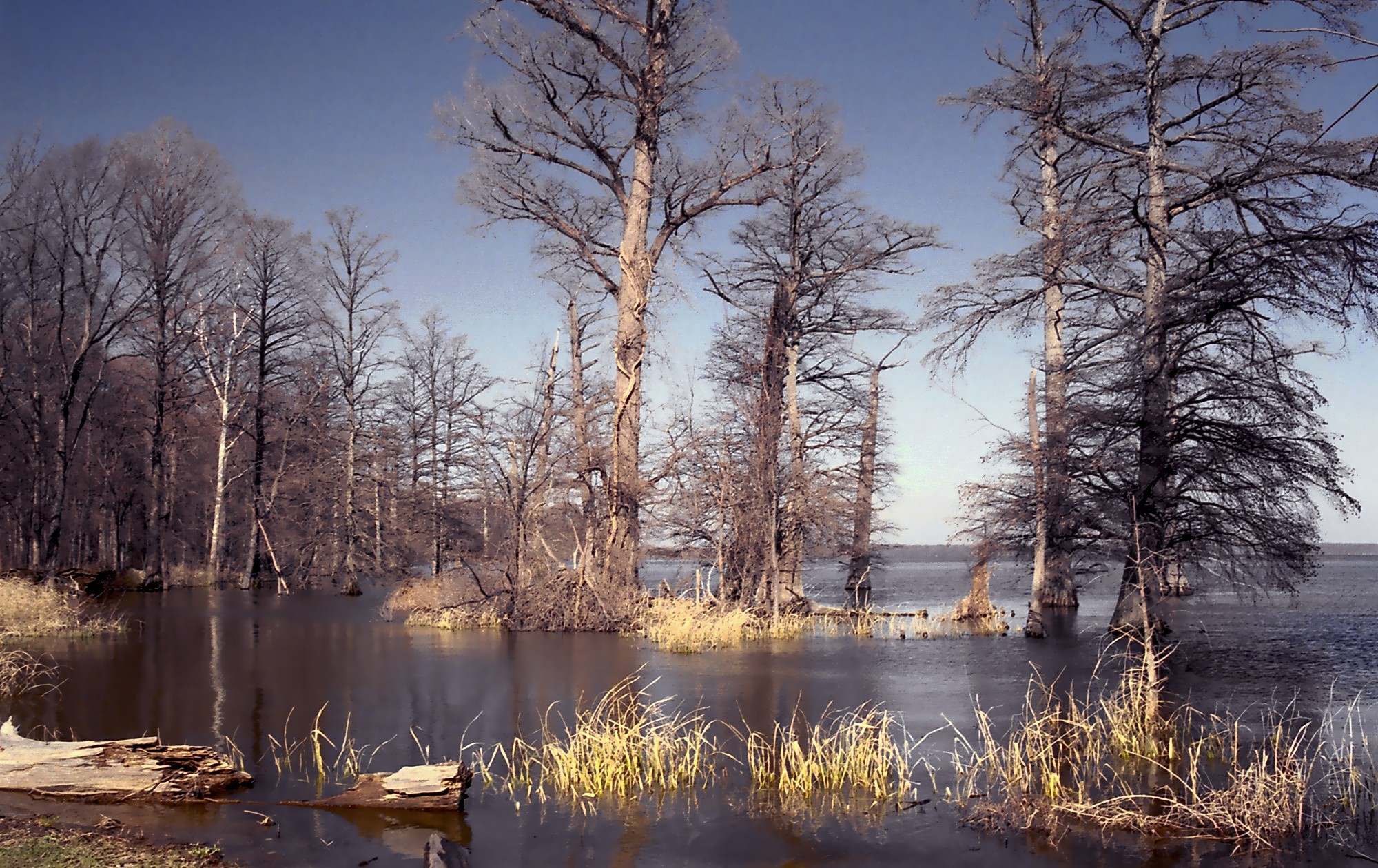
- Reelfoot Lake
- Interactive map of Reelfoot Lake State Park
- Type: Tennessee State Park
- Location: Tiptonville, Lake County, Tennessee
- Coordinates: 36°21′47″N 89°25′58″W
- Established: 1925
- Operator: TDEC
- Website: Reelfoot Lake State Park

Reelfoot Lake State Park is a state park in the northwest corner of Tennessee in the United States. It encompasses Reelfoot Lake and is situated in Lake and Obion counties. The park itself makes up 280 acres (1.1 km^{2}), divided into ten sections around the lake. A major hunting and fishing preserve, it is part of a much larger wildlife refuge which comprises 25,000 acres (100 km^{2}), 15,000 acres (61 km^{2}) of which are water, and harbors almost every kind of shorebird, as well as the golden and American bald eagles. Other animals are also diverse and abundant. The many species of flowering and non-flowering plants attract botany enthusiasts from all over the country. Bald cypress dominates the margins of the lake, but many other trees and shrubs are also present.

== History ==
A series of earthquakes in 1811 and 1812 are credited with the creation of Reelfoot Lake. These seismic events caused a portion of North West Tennessee to subside and the Mississippi River to flow backward for a short period of time. As the water rushed back towards the direction from which it previously came, the forested area adjacent was flooded, creating a new lake.

Reelfoot Lake State Park was established in 1925 when the state purchased land surrounding the lake for preservation. In 1981 The Tennessee Wildlife Resources Agency successfully introduced nesting eagles to the park.

== Activities ==
Activities at Reelfoot Lake State Park include boating, fishing, hiking, and wildlife viewing. There are picnic facilities, and a museum and nature center. Planned programs and events take place in the park.

=== Boating ===
Reelfoot lake is open to boating throughout the year. Boat ramps are located at various points around the lake. As Reelfoot Lake contains a partially submerged forest, boaters should use caution at all times.

=== Fishing ===
Fishing is available throughout the year on Reelfoot lake. Bass, crappie, and catfish are most popular sought after fish. The appropriate Tennessee fishing license and lake permits are required for anglers.

=== Hiking ===
Reelfoot Lake State Park offers several easy to moderate trails allowing access to the unique wetland areas available. Trail information is available at the park's visitor center.

=== Museum and Visitor Center ===
The R.C. Donaldson Memorial Museum features a variety of exhibits displaying the ecology, history, and culture of the area. The nature center at the museum contains various non-releasable raptors, several snakes, and other wildlife. It also serves as the park Visitor Center.

=== Picnic facilities ===
Reelfoot offers visitors approximately 200 picnic sites. Most of the sites have grills and all sites are adjacent to drinking water, toilet facilities, and playgrounds. The park also offers five large pavilions for group use.

=== Wildlife viewing ===
A plethora of wildlife is available for viewing at Reelfoot Lake State Park. Popular wildlife for viewing include Bald eagles, golden eagles, ospreys and other birds of prey. Reelfoot Lake is also located on a major migratory bird flyway which creates opportunities to view a variety of waterfowl, shorebirds, herons, and songbirds. It also has a diversity of turtles and snakes. Turtles include the pond slider, painted, and map turtles. Snakes include the banded and diamondback water snakes, the venomous cottonmouth, and the milk and corn snakes. Frogs, also common, include the green frog, and the gray and green tree frogs, which are vocal during the summers.

=== Planned programs ===
Rangers at Reelfoot offer a variety of programs throughout the year. From January through Mid-March, the park offers a bald eagle tour around Reelfoot lake. Scenic boat tours are offered on the lake from May through September.
