= FlyLady =

American social networking website

FlyLady is a support and self-help group that offers advice to help people with housekeeping, founded by "The FlyLady", Marla Cilley.

The group is based upon the website FlyLady.net, as well as a Constant Contact group for its email mailing list. Members of FlyLady have stated that the group has helped them and has changed their lives.

FlyLady's messages cover topics including clutter, the value of routines, weekly and monthly cleaning, increased self-esteem, and letting go of perfectionism. As of 2016, she had over 300,000 subscribers on her email list, and 550,000 followers on Facebook. In 2020, FlyLady announced an additional presence on Parler. In 2022 FlyLady also began to diversify her platform by publishing on Truth Social, and Bitchute. A store on her website sells organizational tools and housewares, sent from the FlyLady Distribution Center in Brevard, NC. In 2007, sales from the store reached US$4 million.

In November 2015 Alex Elsea, Marla's nephew, launched FlyLady Premium, a paid virtual mentoring service which adds extra support to followers of the FlyLady methodology in small private online groups. FlyLady Premium released an app, FlyLadyPlus in July 2016. Later in 2016, FlyLady herself released a subscription-based iOS reminder app, FlyLady Messenger.

== History ==
Marla Cilley, founder of FlyLady, is from North Carolina. In 1999, Cilley joined a web forum called SHE's Online, based on the housekeeping system created by Pam Young and Peggy Jones, ("The Slob Sisters") detailed in their book Sidetracked Home Executives: From Pigpen to Paradise (1977)

The book covers many of the key topics that were adapted to become the FlyLady system; daily task lists, routines, "slipshod cleaning", and a systematic view to housekeeping. Marla Cilley refers to Pam and Peggy as her mentors and inspiration. She licensed the "Sidetracked Home Executives" system, and the Flylady system is based upon it.

Marla first created an email group (first on e-Groups, then Yahoo! Groups), then published her website, Flylady.net, in February 2001.

The name FlyLady was Marla Cilley's screen name, as she was a fly-fishing fan and instructor. One of the members of the FlyLady e-mail list later created a "backronym" for FLY: Finally Loving Yourself.

== Methodology ==
FlyLady's methodology is outlined in Cilley's book Sink Reflections (Bantam Books, ISBN 0-553-38217-9) and on the web site. The system encourages "baby steps" to develop routines and habits to organize and maintain your home. The primary focus is on "Finally Loving Yourself" by making your life easier by decluttering, menu planning, "anti-procrastination" day, and establishing routines, as well as financial and health-related self-care

In 2007, Marla Cilley and co-author Leanne Ely also released a New York Times bestselling book called Body Clutter: Love Your Body, Love Yourself, which aims to apply the FlyLady's housekeeping methodology to caring for the reader's body, through self-examination and increased self-respect.

Key points in the FlyLady system include:

Babysteps and Routines
New recruits to the FlyLady system are called "Flybabies" and are introduced to "babysteps" - a series of 31 small daily tasks which introduce and then reinforce aspects of cleaning and decluttering, building up to creating personalized routines for morning, afternoon and evening. Once these routines are established, the "Flybaby" has "graduated" and will no longer need the scaffolding of the emails.

Shine Your Sink
Cilley's first instruction to new members is "Go shine your sink!" She asserts that even in a messy kitchen, the cleaned-out and polished sink provides positive reinforcement to the person who cleaned it, encouraging further cleaning in the rest of the room and home.

15 Minutes at a Time
Cilley recommends using a timer to work for only 15 minutes at a time. The short time commitment helps stop procrastination, and reduces opportunities to get sidetracked or bored.

Clutter Cannot Be Organized
Cilley recommends that her followers get rid of excess items in their homes, and bring in fewer items, rather than attempting to organize them. This reduction "decluttering" is done 15 minutes at a time. One such exercise is FlyLady's "27-fling Boogie," in which the follower quickly selects 27 items in their home to discard and 27 items to give away.

Weekly Routines
Cilley advises the use of weekly routines, whereby each weekday is assigned an additional task or focus; Monday is daily cleaning, Wednesday is errand day, Thursday is grocery day and Friday is "desk day", focusing on paperwork and finances, as well as the day to declutter the car.

Weekly Home Blessing
Cilley's adaption of the Pam Young and Peggy Jones' "Slipshod cleaning" is the one-hour housecleaning mission called the "weekly home blessing." Using their timers, followers are instructed to vacuum, dust, mop, empty trash, change bedsheets and clean up old magazines. Each task is allocated ten minutes only.

Get Dressed to Shoes
Cilley insists that her followers "get dressed to lace-up shoes" before beginning their housekeeping tasks - or contacting her for an interview.

Zones
Flylady divides a house into five sections or zones, which are allocated to the five weeks or partial weeks of the month. Each day the email list will provide a "mission" with a detailed cleaning task in the current zone.

Control Journal
Flylady advises the use of a "Control Journal," a household management notebook or binder, to store the owner's routines, lists and other important household information.

Flylady Reminders
Daily reminders of the routines, zones and missions, as well as "testimonials" of the system and products, are sent to subscribers of the FlyLady list.

Perfectionism leads to Procrastination
FlyLady asserts that the most frequent reason for procrastination and inefficiency is perfectionism, as people won't start a task if they think they don't have the time or the ability to do it perfectly. Some frequently repeated sayings in this respect are "good enough is good enough" or "housework done incorrectly still blesses your family".

No Whining
FlyLady often repeats that her Facebook page is a "No Whining Zone", and that "If you can't say anything nice, say nothing at all".
