= Reelfoot Lake =

Lake in Tennessee, United States

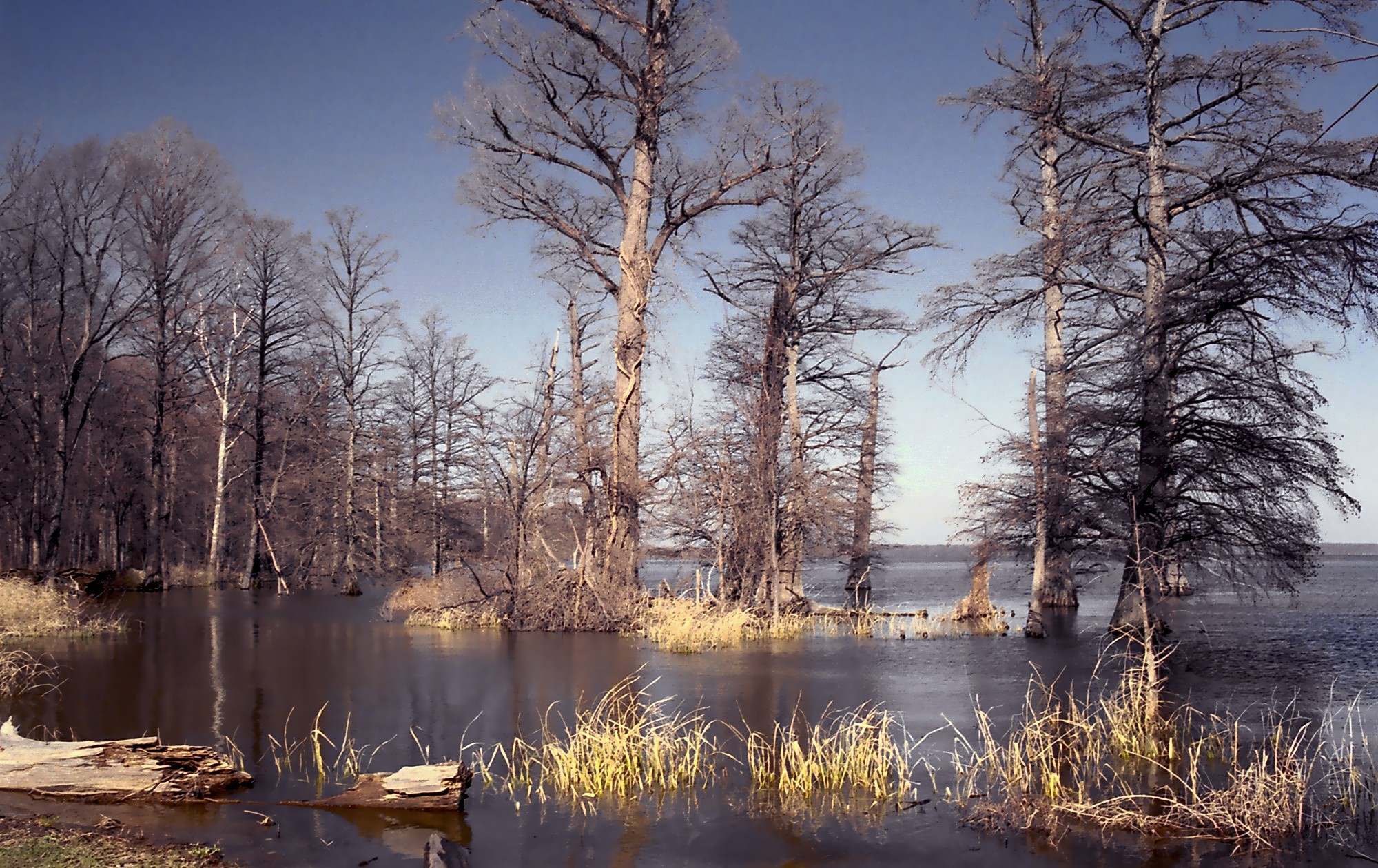

- Location within Tennessee Location within the United States
- Location: Lake / Obion counties, Tennessee, U.S.
- Coordinates: 36°23′20″N 89°23′20″W
- Type: sag pond
- Basin countries: United States

U.S. National Natural Landmark
- Designated: 1965

Reelfoot Lake is a shallow natural lake located in the northwest portion of the U.S. state of Tennessee, in Lake and Obion Counties. Much of it is swamp-like, with bayou-like ditches (some natural, some man-made) connecting more open bodies of water called basins, the largest of which is called Blue Basin. Reelfoot Lake is noted for its bald cypress trees and its nesting pairs of bald eagles.

Public use of the lake and grounds has been preserved since it was acquired by the state of Tennessee in the early 20th century and the area was established as Reelfoot Lake State Park. Lake Isom, a similar, smaller lake to the immediate south, has been designated as a National Wildlife Refuge area. In 1966, Reelfoot Lake was designated as a national natural landmark by the National Park Service.

== History ==
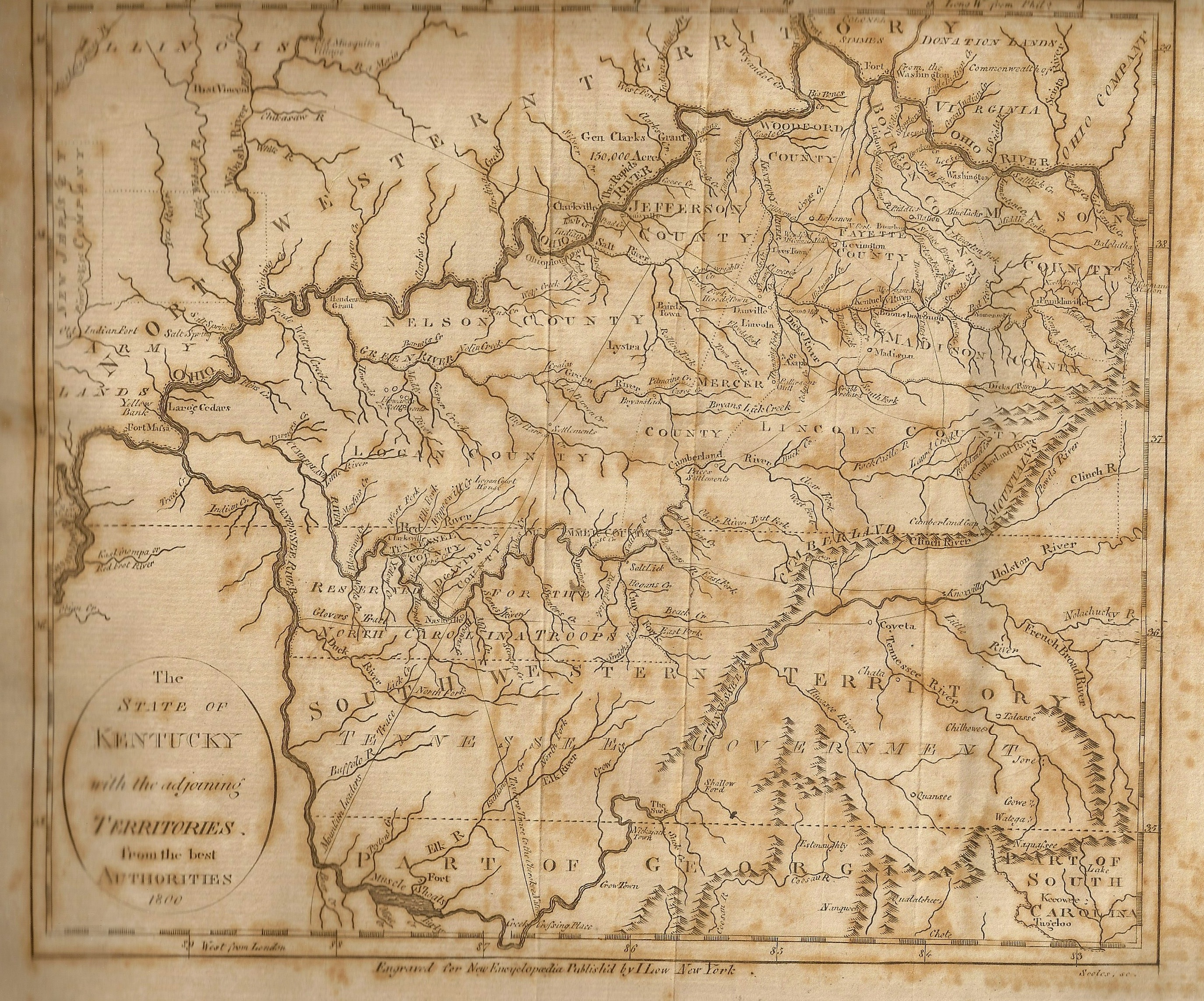
An 1800 map shows a 'Redfoot River' in the area near the Lake, a possible misspelling of the name from Henry Rutherford's 1785 survey. From Low's Encyclopaedia

Reelfoot Lake was formed when the region subsided during the 1811–12 New Madrid earthquakes, which were centered around New Madrid, Missouri. The earthquakes resulted in several major changes in the landforms over a widespread area, with shocks being felt as far away as Quebec, Canada.

A land survey begun by Henry Rutherford in 1785 identified the existent waterway as the Reelfoot River. The now extinct river flowed into the Mississippi River prior to the earthquakes of 1811 and 1812. Jedidiah Morse, in 1797, described the river as 30 yards wide, 7 miles from the mouth. Eliza Bryan, an eyewitness to the earthquakes, wrote in 1816 from Missouri Territory that an enormous lake had grown on the other side of the Mississippi River:

Lately it has been discovered that a lake was formed on the opposite side of the Mississippi River, in the Indian country, upwards of one hundred miles in length, and from one to six miles in width, of the depth of from ten to fifty feet. It has communication with the river at both ends, and it is conjectured that it will not be many years before the principal part, if not the whole of the Mississippi, will pass that way.

— Eliza Bryan, Letter from New Madrid, March 1816

Samuel Cole Williams argued Bryan's dimensions were a "fantastic exaggeration typical of that time of excitement." On early maps, the new lake sometimes took the names of Line Lake (a reference to the state boundary) or Wood Lake. By 1834, Reelfoot River was identified as a north fork of the Obion River. The regional body of water then identified as Wood Lake was located from the north line of Obion county extending south as a marshy swamp. Much of the old lower portion of the Bayou de Chien is submerged in the lake. The Mississippi River beheaded the Bayou de Chien near Hickman, Kentucky while the remaining southern portion feeds Reelfoot Lake along with contributions from Reelfoot Creek and Indian Creek.

Radiocarbon dating of artifacts from the Otto Sharpe site indicate a Native American presence in the Reelfoot Lake Basin around 1650 AD. The site includes European artifacts. Willard Rouse Jillson suggested the Reelfoot River Basin as the location of the Monsoupelea settlement during Jacques Marquette's exploration of the Mississippi River in 1673. An archaeological investigation for the Army Corps of Engineers in 1987 stated that Henry Rutherford's survey party encountered a small Native American settlement near the Bayou de Chien, and named the river Reelfoot for the local leader of the village.

=== Early cartography ===
Year	Cartographer	Waterway and waterbody	Citation
1794	Morse	Reelfoot River, tributary of Mississippi River	
1794	Tanner	Reelfoot River, tributary of Mississippi River	
1795	Russell	Red Foot River, tributary of Mississippi River	
1795	Carey	Reelfoot River, tributary of Mississippi River	
1795	Scott	Reelfoot River, tributary of Mississippi River	
1804	Lewis	Reelfoot River, tributary of Mississippi River	
1810	Low	Reelfoot River, tributary of Mississippi River	
1812	Arrowsmith and Lewis	Reelfoot River, tributary of Mississippi River	
1822	Lucas	Wood Lake, connects 'Reelfoot River' and Obion River	
1825	Buchon	Wood Lake, connects 'Reelfoot River' and Obion River	
1835	Unknown	Reelfoot River, tributary of the Obion River	
1869	Safford	Reelfoot Lake	

=== Legend ===
According to legend, the Reelfoot River, which gave its name to the lake, is said to be named for an Indian chief who had a deformed foot and was nicknamed "Reelfoot" by settlers in the early 19th century. A non-Chickasaw (The Chickasaw Nation Historical Society does not claim him) legend states that the name originated from a prince of a Chickasaw tribe inhabiting the present West Tennessee, who was born with a deformed foot and walked with a rolling motion, so was nicknamed Kolopin, meaning Reelfoot. When he became chief, Reelfoot determined to marry a Choctaw princess, but her father would not permit it. The Great Spirit warned Reelfoot that if he attempted to kidnap the maiden, his village and his people would be destroyed. Reelfoot disobeyed the Spirit, and seized the princess by force and carried her to Chickasaw territory, where he arranged a marriage ceremony.

In the middle of the ceremony, the Great Spirit stamped his foot in anger, causing the earth to quake, and the Father of the Waters raised the Mississippi River over its banks, inundating Reelfoot's homeland. The water flowed into the imprint left by the Spirit's foot, forming a beautiful lake, beneath which Reelfoot, his bride, and his people lie buried. Though the legend is about the Chickasaw and Choctaw tribes that once inhabited the area, these tribes left around the early 14th century, reserving this area as hunting grounds.

Other origins are also cited, for example, in his 1911 story "Fishhead", Irvin S. Cobb claimed the lake "[took] its name from a fancied resemblance in its outline to the splayed, reeled foot of a cornfield Negro."

== 20th century Night Riders ==
Original landowners and their descendants retained title to ground under the water, but local people grew used to treating it as a common resource. Farmers, fishermen, and landowners all derived their livelihoods from the lake and nearby lands. In the early 20th century, however, outside parties began to try to take over control of the lake and its lands. A group of investors bought up most of the land around the shoreline, and organized as the West Tennessee Land Company. In this period, major planters in both Kentucky and Tennessee, sometimes based in cities, were also expanding large-scale cotton cultivation into this area.

Beginning in the spring of 1908, the Reelfoot area was marked by widespread lawlessness in western Kentucky and Tennessee as farmers and residents organized as Night Riders to resist the acquisition by the West Tennessee Land Company of the lake and surrounding lands. They were also reacting to the expansion of large-scale cotton production into this area, which had been dominated by yeomen farmers.

The troubles began when a group of landowners purchased almost the entire shoreline of the lake. They formed the West Tennessee Land Company to enforce what they saw to be their legal rights, including the ownership of the lake, and most importantly its fishing rights. Most of the Night Riders were from families who had derived much of their living from fishing the lake for generations, joined by their friends and supporters. They expanded the reach of their violence, expressing other social tensions by attacking and threatening Black individuals and families in the area. A mob of 50 masked Night Riders lynched all seven members of the David Walker family on the night of October 3, 1908, in Fulton County, Kentucky. The lynchings received national coverage and Governor Augustus E. Willson strongly condemned the murders, but no one was ever prosecuted for them.

Related violence by Night Riders in Tennessee culminated on October 19, 1908, with the kidnapping of two White attorneys, engaged by the West Tennessee Land Company to enforce its claims: Captain Quentin Rankin, also a shareholder in the company, was lynched by being hanged and shot; Colonel R. Z. Taylor was wounded, but escaped by swimming across the lake in the dark. As reported by the Nashville Banner, Taylor escaped, although he was initially reported as killed. His grandson was author Peter Taylor.

Governor Malcolm Rice Patterson of Tennessee directed an investigation of Rankin's murder and ordered in the state militia to suppress the violence. Hundreds of suspects were arrested, and six men were convicted and sentenced to death for the murder. However, the convictions were later overturned by the Tennessee Supreme Court. One officer in the state militia said the six never committed another crime in the region: "They had experienced a close call with the gallows and had no stomach for further night riding."

The governor soon declared the lake to be part of the public domain; the legislature authorized acquisition in 1909, but court challenges over the rights at low water delayed full acquisition for years. The state finally acquired the land and lake, years after constructing levees from 1917 to 1920 to maintain the water level to settle property-rights issues. The Tennessee State Park and Forestry Commission was ordered to determine the precise boundaries and was ultimately given responsibility for this and other state parks, to guarantee public use. A system of parks, wildlife refuges, recreation areas, and public boat ramps has been developed through federal-state cooperation.

== Reelfoot Lake today ==
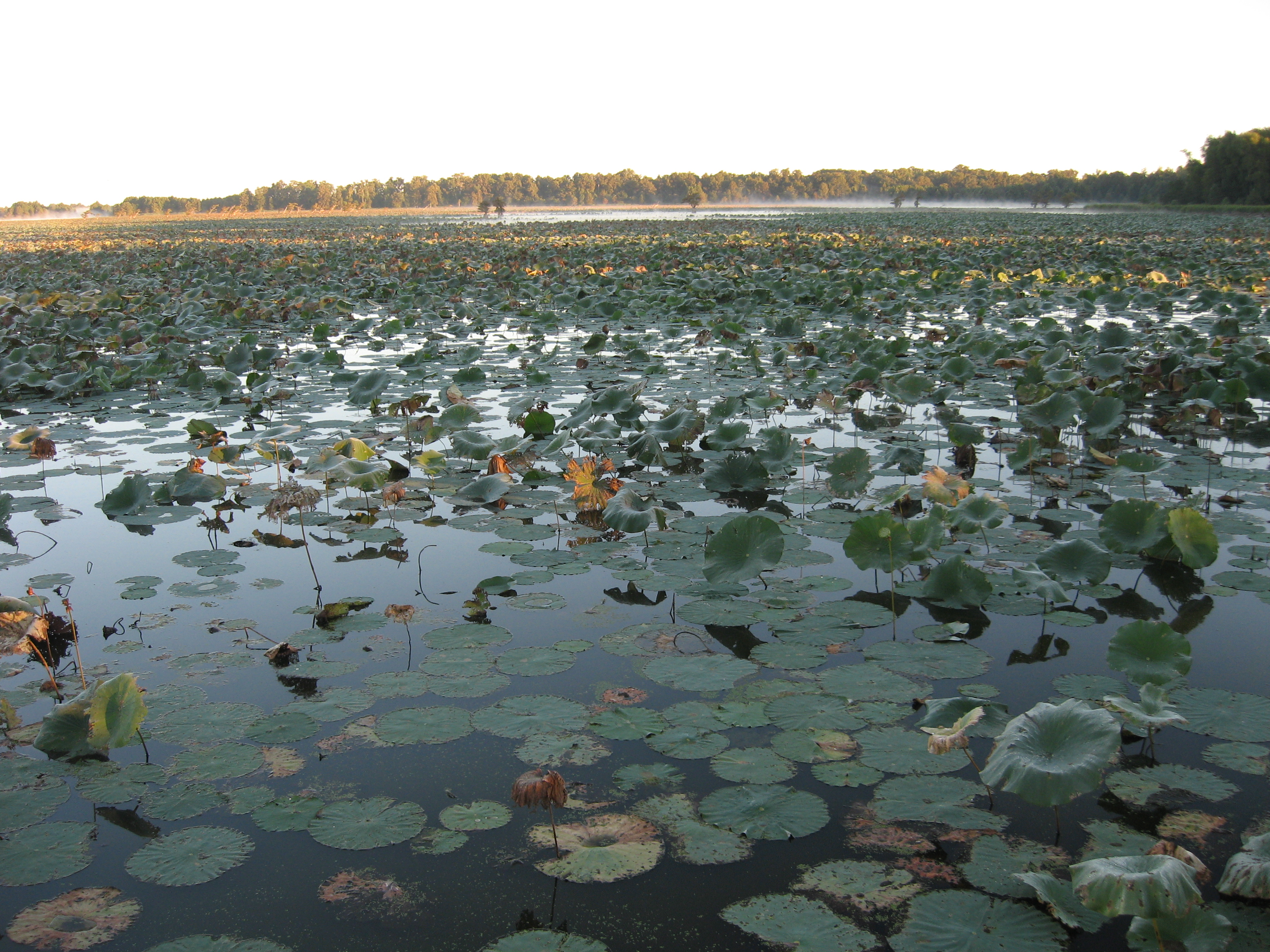
Shallow areas of Reelfoot Lake provide habitat for many aquatic plants

Reelfoot Lake currently covers 15,000 acres (6,100 ha), with a maximum depth of 18 feet (5.5 m) and an average depth of 5.5 feet (1.7 m). It is the only large natural lake in Tennessee. Lake County, Tennessee, in which it is located, was named for it. Until 2003, Reelfoot was the world's only legal commercial fishery for crappie, a species of sunfish. It was served in restaurants near the shore. The area is popular for recreational boating, fishing, and waterfowl hunting.

Since 1930, water levels in the lake have been regulated by the construction and operation of a spillway at the southern end, where the Running Reelfoot Bayou flows out of it. This structure was controversial when first built. In 1939 local residents attempted to blow it up, unsuccessfully.

In the early 21st century, the 80-year-old spillway was regarded as obsolete by both the United States Fish and Wildlife Service and the United States Army Corps of Engineers. They planned to replace it. A new spillway was completed in 2013 and became operational. This has helped regulate water levels and by doing so, helped the overall health of the lake and its species.

The town of Samburg, Tennessee, is the only incorporated municipality on the lake's shores.

The story of the formation of Reelfoot Lake is told through an earthquake simulator program at Discovery Park of America, a museum 14 miles from the lake in Union City, Tennessee.

== Representation in other media ==
Reelfoot Lake was a filming site for three movie productions: the 1957 drama Raintree County, the 1967 Oscar-winner In the Heat of the Night, and 1998's U.S. Marshals.

== See also ==
- New Madrid Seismic Zone
- Reelfoot Lake State Park
