= Tiptonville, Tennessee =

- Town
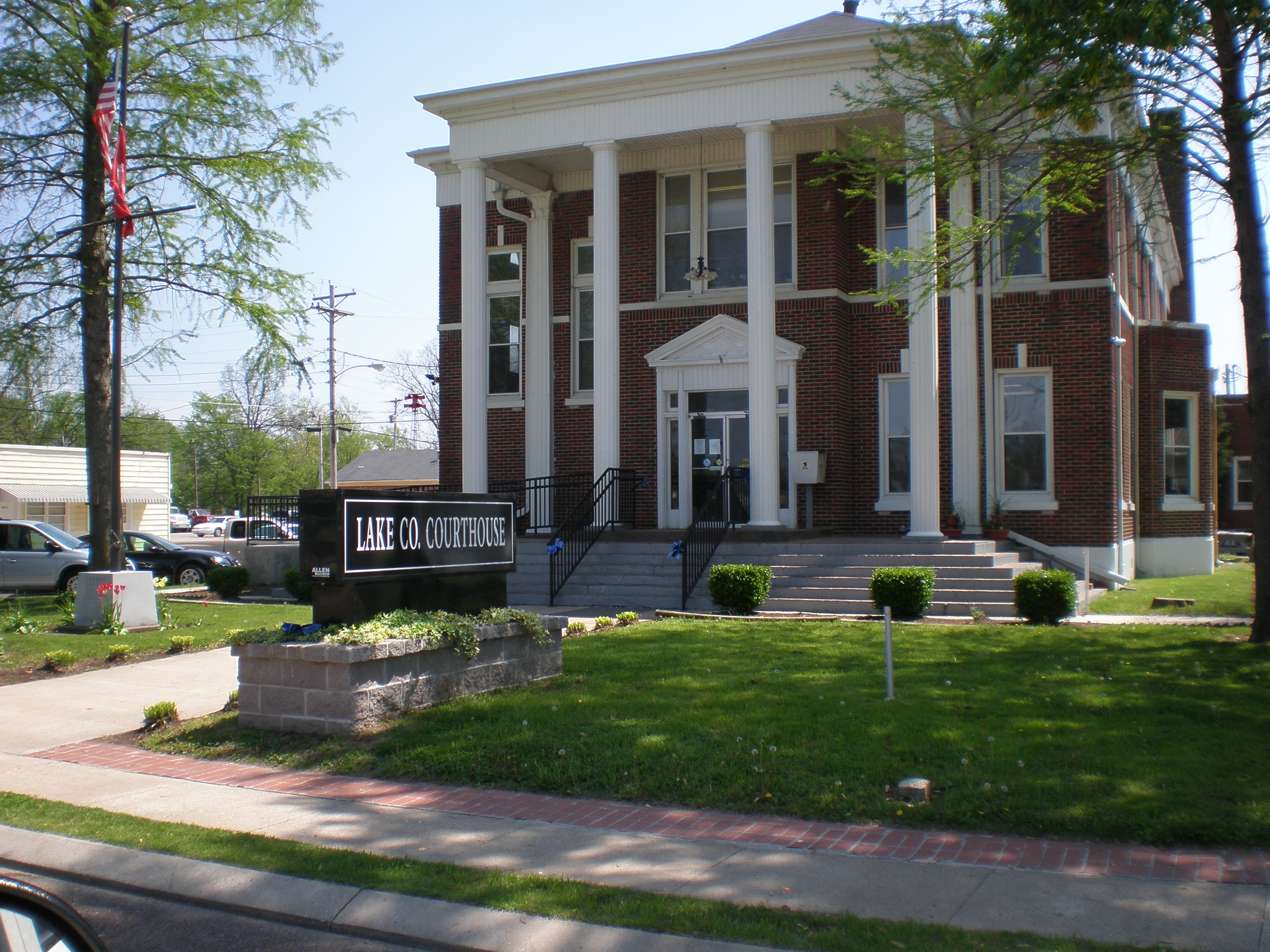
- Lake County Courthouse in Tiptonville

- Location of Tiptonville in Lake County, Tennessee.

- Location within Tennessee Location within the United States
- Coordinates: 36°22′39″N 89°28′34″W
- Country: United States
- State: Tennessee
- County: Lake
- Established: 1857
- Incorporated: 1900
- Named for: William Tipton (early settler)

Area
  - Total: 3.34 sq mi (8.65 km^{2})
  - Land: 3.32 sq mi (8.59 km^{2})
  - Water: 0.023 sq mi (0.06 km^{2})
- Elevation: 302 ft (92 m)

Population (2020)
  - Total: 3,976
  - Density: 1,199.2/sq mi (463.02/km^{2})
- Time zone: UTC-6 (Central (CST))
  - Summer (DST): UTC-5 (CDT)
- ZIP code: 38079
- Area code: 731
- FIPS code: 47-74540
- GNIS feature ID: 1272690
- Website: tiptonville.org

Tiptonville is a town in and the county seat of Lake County, Tennessee, United States. As of the 2020 census, Tiptonville had a population of 3,976. It is also home to the Northwest Correctional Complex, a maximum security prison.

== History ==
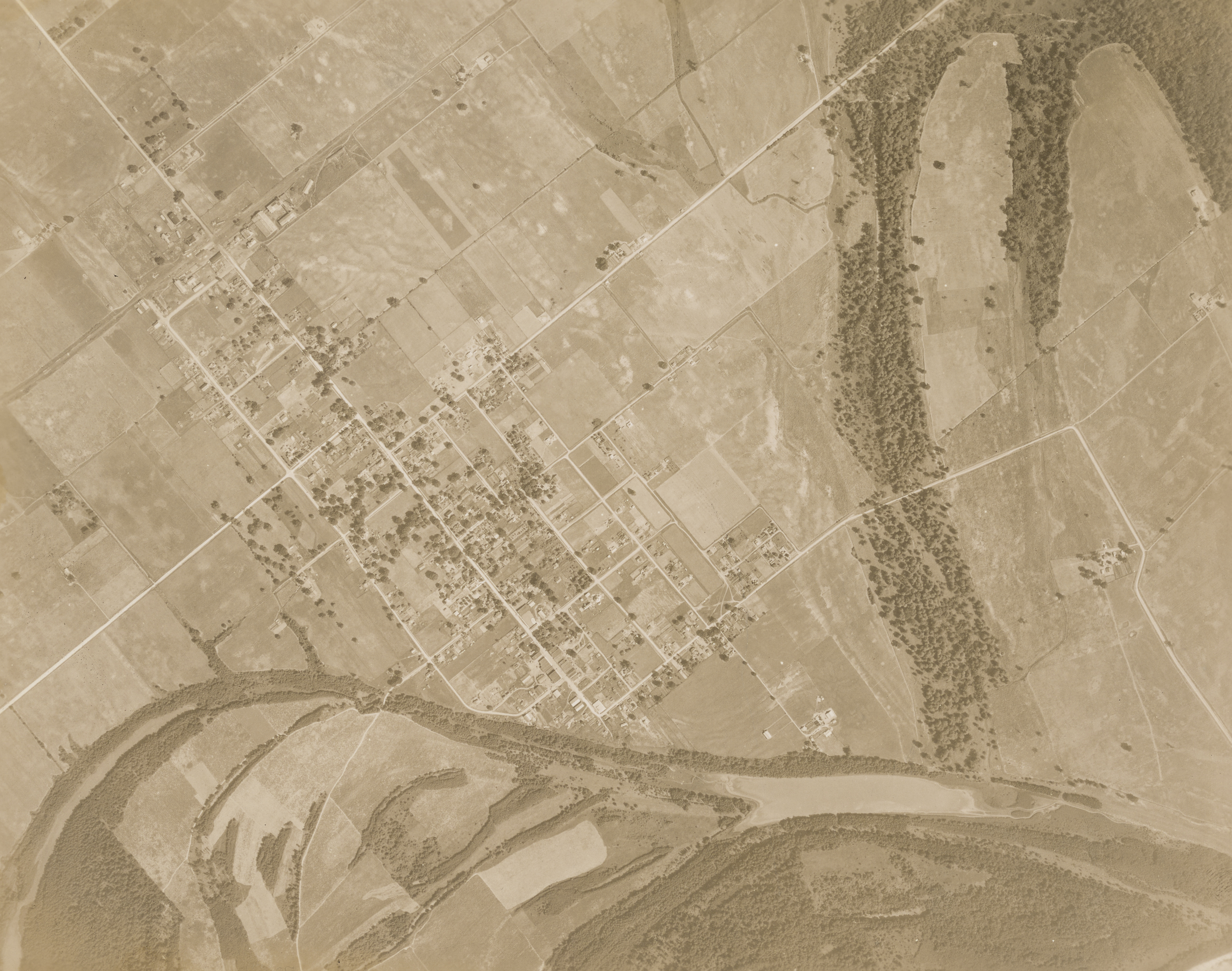
Aerial view of Tiptonville in 1922

Tiptonville was established in 1857, but was not incorporated until 1900. It was designated the county seat when Lake County was created in 1870.

=== American Civil War ===
Tiptonville was the scene of the surrender of Confederate forces at the end of the 1862 Battle of Island Number Ten in the American Civil War. The monument for this battle is located on State Route 22 approximately three miles north of Tiptonville, since the island itself, the focal point of the battle, has been eroded by the flow of the Mississippi River and no longer exists.

=== Early 1900s ===
On March 19, 1901, Tiptonville was destroyed by a fire three days after a mob of white townsmen had lynched Ike Fitzgerald, a black man accused of raping a white woman. Whites speculated that the blaze, which burned 30 buildings and residences, including all of the stores on the main street, had been deliberately set by African Americans in reprisal for Fitzgerald's lynching.

In 1904, the Dyersburg Northern Railroad was chartered. This line connected Dyersburg to Hickman, KY, via Tiptonville, and began operating in 1910. The company changed their name to the Chicago, Memphis, & Gulf Railroad in 1909.

=== 2000s-present day ===
In July 2025, the city gained attention nationwide when a man killed four people and left an infant abandoned in a random person's yard.

== Geography ==
Earthquakes in the Tiptonville area since 1974.

Tiptonville is located at 36°22′39″N 89°28′34″W (36.377610, −89.476022), on a small rise known as the Tiptonville Dome and within the New Madrid Seismic Zone. The Mississippi River is to the west and north, the Kentucky Bend is to the north, and Reelfoot Lake is to the east.

According to the United States Census Bureau, the town has a total area of 1.4 square miles (3.6 km^{2}), all land.

== Demographics ==
Historical population
Census	Pop.	Note	%±
1880	946		—
1890	363		−61.6%
1910	843		—
1920	1,050		24.6%
1930	1,359		29.4%
1940	1,503		10.6%
1950	1,953		29.9%
1960	2,068		5.9%
1970	2,407		16.4%
1980	2,438		1.3%
1990	2,149		−11.9%
2000	2,439		13.5%
2010	4,464		83.0%
2020	3,976		−10.9%

=== 2020 census ===
As of the 2020 census, Tiptonville had a population of 3,976. The median age was 41.4 years. 10.9% of residents were under the age of 18 and 11.8% of residents were 65 years of age or older. For every 100 females there were 274.4 males, and for every 100 females age 18 and over there were 325.1 males age 18 and over.

0.0% of residents lived in urban areas, while 100.0% lived in rural areas.

There were 872 households in Tiptonville, of which 28.1% had children under the age of 18 living in them. Of all households, 26.3% were married-couple households, 20.3% were households with a male householder and no spouse or partner present, and 46.1% were households with a female householder and no spouse or partner present. About 40.4% of all households were made up of individuals and 16.8% had someone living alone who was 65 years of age or older.

There were 1,006 housing units, of which 13.3% were vacant. The homeowner vacancy rate was 3.6% and the rental vacancy rate was 7.5%.

Racial composition as of the 2020 census
Race	Number	Percent
White	2,362	59.4%
Black or African American	1,443	36.3%
American Indian and Alaska Native	6	0.2%
Asian	6	0.2%
Native Hawaiian and Other Pacific Islander	2	0.1%
Some other race	58	1.5%
Two or more races	99	2.5%
Hispanic or Latino (of any race)	108	2.7%

=== 2000 census ===
As of the census of 2000, there were 2,439 people, 918 households, and 570 families residing in the town. The population density was 1,704.0 inhabitants per square mile (657.9/km^{2}). There were 992 housing units at an average density of 693.1 per square mile (267.6/km^{2}). The racial makeup of the town was 62.57% White, 36.16% African American, 0.33% Native American, 0.08% Asian, 0.12% from other races, and 0.74% from two or more races. Hispanic or Latino of any race were 0.82% of the population.

There were 918 households, out of which 26.8% had children under the age of 18 living with them, 38.5% were married couples living together, 19.4% had a female householder with no husband present, and 37.9% were non-families. 35.2% of all households were made up of individuals, and 19.1% had someone living alone who was 65 years of age or older. The average household size was 2.23 and the average family size was 2.87.

In the town, the population was spread out, with 20.7% under the age of 18, 9.4% from 18 to 24, 28.3% from 25 to 44, 23.2% from 45 to 64, and 18.4% who were 65 years of age or older. The median age was 40 years. For every 100 females, there were 102.7 males. For every 100 females age 18 and over, there were 103.9 males.

The median income for a household in the town was $19,475, and the median income for a family was $24,929. Males had a median income of $25,089 versus $18,333 for females. The per capita income for the town was $11,843. About 21.1% of families and 26.5% of the population were below the poverty line, including 43.0% of those under age 18 and 28.7% of those age 65 or over.

== Media ==
A local newspaper, The Lake County Banner, is published in Tiptonville.

Tiptonville is located in the southernmost portion of the Cape Girardeau–Paducah–Harrisburg television market. Union City based Low-Power Class A television station WUWT-CD (channel 26) serves Obion, and Lake counties (and Tiptonville) with programming from Retro TV, supplemented with programming from The Family Channel airing on its second digital subchannel. The main television broadcast stations serving extreme northwest Tennessee are:

- WSIL-TV 3 Harrisburg (ABC)
- WPSD-TV 6 Paducah (NBC)
- WLJT 11 Lexington, TN (PBS)
- KFVS-TV 12 Cape Girardeau (CBS)
  - KFVS-TV 12.2 Cape Girardeau (The CW)
- KBSI 23 Cape Girardeau (Fox)
- WUWT-CD 26 Union City (RTV)
- WKPD 29 Paducah (PBS)
- WDKA 49 Paducah (MNTV)

== Education ==
- Lake County High School

== Notable people ==
- Clifton Cates (1893–1970), 19th Commandant of the U.S. Marine Corps
- Carl Perkins, musician
- Jerry Reese, former general manager of the New York Giants

== See also ==
- List of municipalities in Tennessee
