= Tennessee State Route 78 =

State route in Tennessee, United States

State Route 78
- Lake Road
- SR 78; primary in red, secondary in blue

Route information
- Maintained by TDOT
- Length: 36.93 mi (59.43 km)
- Existed: October 1, 1923–present

Major junctions
- South end: SR 104 in Dyersburg
- US 51 in Dyersburg; I-155 / US 412 in Dyersburg
- North end: KY 94 at the Kentucky State Line near Tyler

Location
- Country: United States
- State: Tennessee
- Counties: Dyer, Obion, Lake

Highway system
- Tennessee State Routes; Interstate; US; State
← US 78	→ US 79

State Route 78 (SR 78) is a 36.93-mile-long (59.43 km) primary state highway in northwestern Tennessee, United States. This highway carries a dual primary and secondary designation, however, the majority of this highway is signed as a primary State Highway. The only portion of SR 78 designated as secondary is between its southern terminus at SR 104 to US 51 in Dyersburg.

== Route description ==
SR 78 begins in Dyersburg as a 5-lane urban highway (with center turn lane) featuring a 40 mph (65 km/h) speed limit. North of US 51/SR 3 the road expands to a 7-lane urban highway and features the highest traffic counts in the Dyersburg area, frequently rising above 30,000 AADT. This section of SR 78 at one time featured 40 mph (65 km/h) speed limits, however, due to excessive traffic this section has been reduced to a 30 mph (50 km/h) speed limit. Locals in Dyersburg refer to the section between US 51 and I-155 as 'Hamburger Alley' because of the number of fast food restaurants lining this section of the highway. North of I-155 the highway quickly transitions from a 4-lane divided highway to a rural 2-lane highway carrying a 55 mph (90 km/h) speed limit. There is also a short 4-lane undivided section within the Ridgely city limits. SR 78 provides direct access to Reelfoot Lake State Park via SR 213 on the west side of the lake, and the park's headquarters and visitor center on the south end of the lake via SR 21/SR 22. Access to the Northwest Correctional Complex is accomplished via SR 212 north of Tiptonville.

SR 78 is bannered as a Tennessee Scenic Parkway from its southern terminus in Dyersburg to Tiptonville at the intersection of SR 78 and SR 21/SR 22. SR 78 also carries the Great River Road designation from its intersection with SR 79 all the way to its northern terminus at the Kentucky/Tennessee state line. This highway starts out in rolling, hilly terrain and descends the first Chickasaw Bluff shortly before reaching Bogota, from this point north, the highway traverses low-lying farmland and bottomland. The Obion River crossing south of Bogota, Tennessee once held the distinction of being the oldest highway bridge in Tennessee that was still in service. The old bridge at this river crossing has since been demolished and replaced by a modern concrete bridge featuring two lanes with full-width shoulders.

== Major intersections ==
County	Location	mi	km	Destinations	Notes
Dyer	Dyersburg	0.0	0.0	SR 104 (Forrest Street) – Finley, Trenton	Southern terminus of SR 78
Dyer	Dyersburg	1.6	2.6	US 51 (US Highway 51 Bypass/SR 3) – Ripley, Newbern	
Dyer	Dyersburg	2.2– 2.5	3.5– 4.0	I-155 / US 412 – Union City, St. Louis	I-155 exit 13
Dyer	Nauvoo	5.0	8.0	SR 182 west (Lenox-Nauvoo Road) – Lenox	Eastern terminus of SR 182
Dyer		7.9– 8.4	12.7– 13.5	Bridge over the Obion River	
Dyer	Bogota	9.5	15.3	SR 103 west	Eastern terminus of SR 103
Obion	No major junctions				
Lake		15.2	24.5	SR 79 west / Great River Road south to SR 181 / I-155	Eastern terminus of SR 79; southern end of Great River Road concurrency
Lake	Tiptonville	25.2	40.6	SR 21 / SR 22 south (Church Street/Lake Drive) – Mississippi River, Hornbeak, Reelfoot Lake, Samburg	Southern end of SR 22 concurrency; provides access to Reelfoot Lake State Park
Lake	Tiptonville	25.7	41.4	SR 22 north – Kentucky Bend	Northern end of SR 22 concurrency
Lake		27.1	43.6	SR 212 west (Wray Road) – Northwest Correctional Complex	Eastern terminus of SR 212
Lake		32.9	52.9	SR 213 east (Grays Camp Road) – Gray's Camp, Reelfoot Lake Airport	Western terminus of SR 213
Lake		36.93	59.43	KY 94 east / Great River Road north – Hickman	Northern terminus of SR 78 at the Kentucky state line
1.000 mi = 1.609 km; 1.000 km = 0.621 mi: Concurrency terminus

== See also ==
- List of state routes in Tennessee
- List of highways numbered 78
