= Miston, Tennessee =

- Census-designated place
- Nickname: "Baggett-ville
- Location within Tennessee Location within the United States
- Coordinates: 36°9′53″N 89°29′21″W
- Country: United States
- State: Tennessee
- County: Dyer

Area
  - Total: 1.39 sq mi (3.59 km^{2})
  - Land: 1.39 sq mi (3.59 km^{2})
  - Water: 0 sq mi (0.00 km^{2})
- Elevation: 269 ft (82 m)

Population (2020)
  - Total: 77
  - Density: 55.5/sq mi (21.44/km^{2})
- Time zone: UTC-6 (Central (CST))
  - Summer (DST): UTC-5 (CDT)
- ZIP Code: 38080 (Ridgely)
- Area code: 731
- FIPS code: 47-49420
- GNIS feature ID: 2813078

Miston is an unincorporated community and census-designated place (CDP) in Dyer County, Tennessee, United States. It was first listed as a CDP prior to the 2020 census.

It is in the northwest part of the county, along Tennessee State Route 103, which leads east 3 miles (5 km) to Bogota and west the same distance to Tennessee State Route 181, less than 2 miles (3 km) east of the Mississippi River. Dyersburg, the county seat, is 13 miles (21 km) southeast of Miston.

A post office operated in Miston from 1909 to 1985.

== Demographics ==
Historical population
Census	Pop.	Note	%±
2020	77		—
U.S. Decennial Census

== Education ==
The school district is the Dyer County School District. The zoned high school is Dyer County High School in Newbern.
