= Tennessee State Route 103 =

State highway in Tennessee, United States

State Route 103
- SR 103 highlighted in red

Route information
- Maintained by TDOT
- Length: 6.7 mi (10.8 km)

Major junctions
- West end: SR 181 near Tennemo
- East end: SR 78 at Bogota

Location
- Country: United States
- State: Tennessee
- Counties: Dyer

Highway system
- Tennessee State Routes; Interstate; US; State
← SR 102	→ SR 104

State Route 103 (SR 103) is a secondary state highway in Dyer County, Tennessee, United States. It runs from the Mississippi River east to SR 78 in Bogota. This highway crosses SR 181/Great River Road and passes through the small communities of Miston and Tennemo. The first 1.6 miles (2.6 km) of this highway are gravel and are subject to flooding from the Mississippi River. This section is unsigned in the field but maintained by TDOT as SR 103.

== Major intersections ==
The entire route is in Dyer County.

Location	mi	km	Destinations	Notes
	0	0.0	SR 181 / Great River Road – Ridgely, Halls	SR 103 becomes signed and paved
Bogota	6.7	10.8	SR 78 – Ridgely, Dyersburg	Eastern terminus
1.000 mi = 1.609 km; 1.000 km = 0.621 mi
