= Tennessee State Route 79 =

State highway in Tennessee, United States

State Route 79
- SR 79; primary in red, secondary in blue

Route information
- Maintained by TDOT
- Length: 10.37 mi (16.69 km)
- Existed: 1947–present

Major junctions
- West end: Dead end at Mississippi River at Hathaway
- SR 181 / Great River Road near Cottonwood Grove
- East end: SR 78 near Ridgely

Location
- Country: United States
- State: Tennessee
- Counties: Lake

Highway system
- Tennessee State Routes; Interstate; US; State
← US 79	→ SR 80

State Route 79 (SR 79) is a 10.37-mile-long (16.69 km) state highway in southwestern Lake County, Tennessee. SR 79 has a dual primary and secondary designation and is one of a few state routes in Tennessee to have an aggregate (gravel) road surface.

== Route description ==
The western terminus of SR 79 is located at the Mississippi River (Island 15) in the extreme southwestern portion of Lake County, Tennessee, and travels across low-lying areas that are subject to flooding from the river. SR 79 from its western terminus (mile 0.00) to mile 6.66 has been repeatedly damaged by seasonal flooding and as a result TDOT uses gravel, crushed stone, sand, and dirt to rebuild the road surface when it has been damaged from flooding. This section is unsigned in the field. At mile 6.66, SR 79 crosses the federal levee to its eastern terminus near Ridgely, Tennessee.

== History ==
SR 79 was known as Powell Ferry Road prior to its designation as a state route and served the Powell Ferry (also known as the Pemiscot Ferry) that crossed the Mississippi River to Caruthersville, Missouri, where it continued west as Missouri Route 84. This ferry began service in 1895 and was operated by Lee Line Steamers. Ferry service was discontinued by the mid-1970s when the nearby Caruthersville Bridge opened.

The roadway geometry of SR 79 has been changed very little since its designation as a state highway with the only major change being at the junction of SR 79 and SR 181.

== Major intersections ==
The entire route is in Lake County.

Location	mi	km	Destinations	Notes
Hathaway	0.0	0.0	Dead end at Mississippi River	Western terminus; SR 79 begins as an unsigned secondary highway
	6.6	10.6	SR 181 south / Great River Road to I-155	SR 79 becomes a signed primary highway; northern terminus of SR 181; western end of Great River Road concurrency
	10.3	16.6	SR 78 / Great River Road north – Tiptonville, Dyersburg	Eastern terminus; SR 79 ends as a primary highway; provides access to Reelfoot Lake State Park and Reelfoot National Wildlife Refuge
1.000 mi = 1.609 km; 1.000 km = 0.621 mi: Concurrency terminus
