= List of highways numbered 181 =

The following highways are numbered 181:

== Canada ==
- Prince Edward Island Route 181

== Chile ==
- Route 181-CH in Araucanía Region

== Cuba ==
- Guanabacoa–Cotorro Road (2–181)

== India ==
- National Highway 181 (India)

== Ireland ==
- R181 road (Ireland)

== Japan ==
- Japan National Route 181

== United Kingdom ==
- M181 motorway (East Butterwick-Scunthorpe)
- B181 road
- A181 road

== United States ==
- Interstate 181 (former)
- U.S. Route 181
- Alabama State Route 181
- Arizona State Route 181
- Arkansas Highway 181
- California State Route 181
- Connecticut Route 181
- Florida State Road 181 (former)
- Georgia State Route 181 (former)
- Georgia State Route 181
- Illinois Route 181 (former)
- Iowa Highway 181 (former)
- K-181 (Kansas highway)
- Kentucky Route 181
- Louisiana Highway 181
- Maine State Route 181
- Maryland Route 181
- Massachusetts Route 181
- M-181 (Michigan highway) (former)
- Missouri Route 181
- New Jersey Route 181
- New Mexico State Road 181
- New York State Route 181 (former)
- North Carolina Highway 181
- Ohio State Route 181
- Pennsylvania Route 181
- South Carolina Highway 181
- Tennessee State Route 181
- Utah State Route 181 (former)
- Texas State Highway 181 (former)
  - Texas State Highway Loop 181
  - Farm to Market Road 181 (Texas)
- Virginia State Route 181
- Washington State Route 181
- Wisconsin Highway 181

Territories:

- Puerto Rico Highway 181

Preceded by 180	Lists of highways 181	Succeeded by 182
