= Missouri Route 84 =

State highway in Missouri, U.S.

Route 84
- Route 84 highlighted in red, Route 84 Spur in blue

Route information
- Maintained by MoDOT
- Length: 30.215 mi (48.626 km)
- Existed: 1921–present

Major junctions
- West end: AR 90 at Arkansas state line near Kennett
- US 412 in Kennett; US 412 near Hayti Heights; I-55 / US 61 in Hayti
- East end: I-155 / US 412 / Route Y in Caruthersville

Location
- Country: United States
- State: Missouri
- Counties: Dunklin, Pemiscot

Highway system
- Missouri State Highway System; Interstate; US; State; Supplemental
← Route 83	→ Route 85

Route 84 is a state highway in the Missouri bootheel. The route starts at Arkansas Highway 90 (AR 90) over the St. Francis River on the Arkansas–Missouri state line. The road travels eastward to Kennett, where it becomes concurrent with U.S. Route 412 (US 412). East of Kennett, the concurrent routes travel eastward on a divided highway to Hayti Heights, where the concurrency ends. Route 84 travels through Hayti Heights and Hayti, and it crosses Interstate 55 (I-55) and US 61. The route then travels southeastwards to Caruthersville, and bypasses the central area of the city. In the southern part of Caruthersville, Route 84 ends at an interchange with I-155 and US 412.

The route was designated in 1921, from the Arkansas state line to Caruthersville, as part of the new state highway system. The route was opened by 1926, and it became one of the most used routes in southeast Missouri within one year. Route 84 was fully paved by 1932. In 1957, a new bypass was opened in Caruthersville, and the route was rerouted onto it. Two interchanges were built at Interstate Highways; the one at I-55 opened by 1971, and I-155 by 1977.

== Route description ==
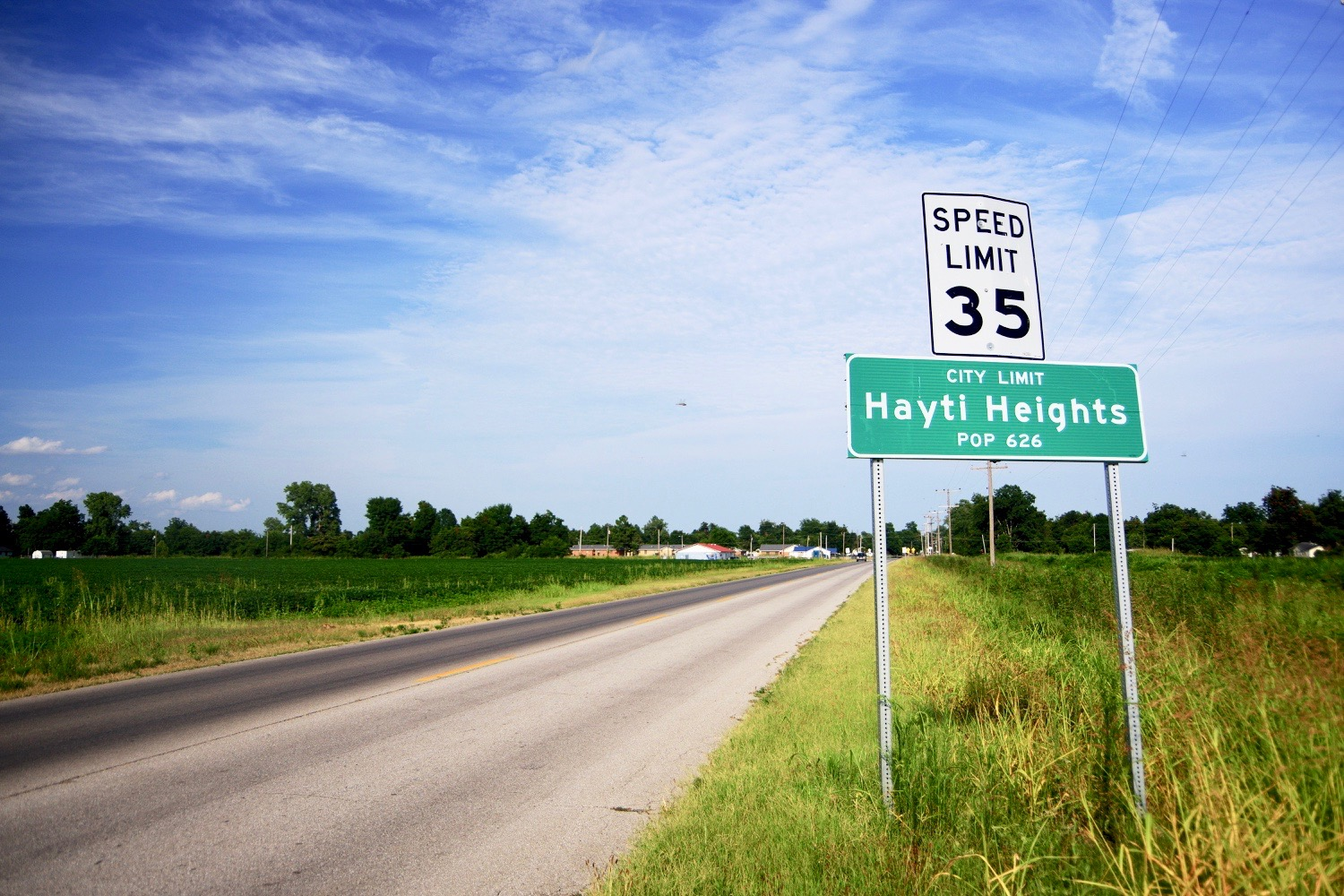
Route 84 in Hayti Heights

Route 84 is located in Dunklin and Pemiscot counties. In 2016, Missouri Department of Transportation (MoDOT) calculated as many as 14,936 vehicles traveling on Route 84 east of I-55 and US 61, and as few as 2,310 vehicles traveling north of I-155 and US 412. This is expressed in terms of annual average daily traffic (AADT), a measure of traffic volume for any average day of the year.

Route 84 starts at a bridge over the St. Francis River and the eastern terminus of AR 90 at the Arkansas–Missouri state line. The road travels eastward across farmland and later enters the city limits of Kennett near County Road 547 (CRD 547). As St. Francis Street, Route 84 intersects supplemental Routes E and O, which lead to US 412 and Route 25 respectively. At the Dunklin County Courthouse, in the center of the city, the route shifts southwards slightly, and it becomes First Street. The road continues through the main commercial areas of Kennett, and it transitions from a two-lane road to a four-lane road. Route 84 becomes concurrent with US 412 on the eastern side of the city, and it intersects Airport Road, the entrance to the Kennett Memorial Airport, soon after. East of Airport Road, Route 84 and US 412 intersect the southern terminus of Route 25. The road becomes a four-lane divided highway east of Country Club Drive. The highway crosses the West Ditch, intersects the northern terminus of Route Z, and then leaves the city limits of Kennett. Near Route U, Route 84 and US 412 cross over the Little River. At the entrance of the Little River Conservation Area and the northern terminus of Route NN, the highway enters Pemiscot County.

In rural Pemiscot County, the highway intersects several supplemental routes, which lead to Bragg City, Pascola, and several unincorporated communities. The two routes split at a three-way junction west of Hayti Heights; Route 84 continuing eastward as a two-lane road, and US 412 continuing southeastward as a four-lane road leading to I-55 and I-155. West of Pascola Road, the route briefly enters the city limits of Hayti Heights. Route 84 intersects five residential streets past Pascola Road in Hayti Heights before entering Hayti. As Washington Street, the route crosses over the River Subdivision near Railroad Street. Route 84 then enters downtown Hayti, where it intersects Route P, also known as Third Street. East of Fifth Street, the road crosses over a railroad owned by the Pemiscot County Port Authority. Past Route J, Route 84 leaves downtown Hayti, and begins traveling southeastwards. The route intersects I-55 and US 61 at a diamond interchange and a frontage road adjacent to the highway. The road leaves the city limits of Hayti afterwards, and begins traveling through farmland.

Northwest of Caruthersville, Route 84 meets Route D and crosses over the Pemiscot County Port Authority railroad again. Near CRD 346, the route enters Caruthersville city limits. At its intersection with Third Street and S.P. Reynolds Avenue, Route 84 turns south and travels along Truman Boulevard. Route 84 Spur continues eastwards from the intersection as Third Street. Route 84 runs southward and bypasses downtown Caruthersville, intersecting streets within a residential area. At Route U and Cemetery Road, the route briefly travels eastward, before continuing southward on Ward Avenue. The road travels on the southeastern edge of the city's corporation limit until it reaches to a diamond interchange with I-155 and US 412. Route 84 ends at the interchange, and the road continues as Route Y, which ends at CRD 534 and CRD 553.

== History ==
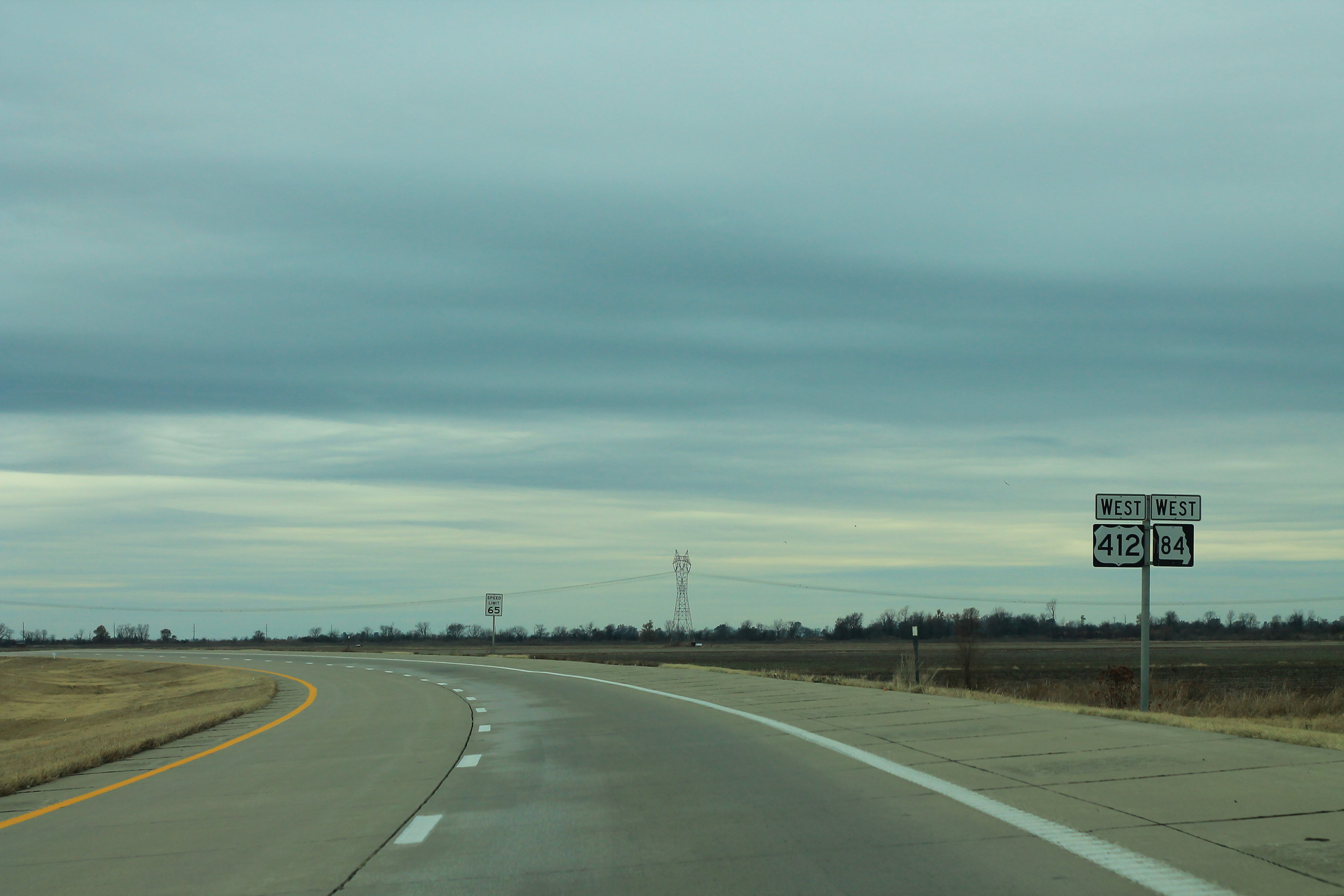
US 412 and Route 84

The route was designated in 1921 as part of the Centennial Road Law, which created a highway system for the state of Missouri. It started at the Arkansas state line and traveled east to Caruthersville, providing a route to St. Louis via Kennett and Poplar Bluff from Pemiscot County. A section from the Dunklin–Pemiscot county line to Hayti was being paved partially in concrete later that year, and did not finish until the next year. The route in Pemiscot County was completed by 1925, excluding the bridges over Little River, which were completed in 1926, providing the first all-year crossing over the river. By 1927, the route was the most heavily used highway in southeast Missouri. The road was flooded during the Great Mississippi Flood of 1927 in April, from the Arkansas state line to Kennett. The waters receded about three months later, and the cost to repair the damage was $10,000 (1928 USD). The last unpaved section from Hayti to Caruthersville began paving in 1930. Two bridges were being constructed in 1931, and opened the year after. All of the route was paved by 1932. The route was widened to two lanes from Kennett to Hayti in 1934.

In 1957, a bypass around Caruthersville was being built to relieve traffic going through downtown. Known as Fair Boulevard (due to its vicinity to the American Legion Fairground), Route 84 was rerouted to the new bypass as it was state maintained. The boulevard opened in the same year, improving traffic in the area. Markings were installed two years later. The five bridges over the Little River were replaced starting in 1965, at a cost of $802,442 (1965 USD). In 1969, an interchange at I-55 was being constructed, and it was completed by 1971. Route 84 was extended southwards to a new interchange at I-155 by 1977, replacing a section of Route Y. Until that event, Route 84 ended at a ferry site on the Mississippi River, where it continued as Tennessee State Route 79 in Lake County, Tennessee. That ferry, which began service in 1895, was discontinued prior to the opening of the I-155 interchange.

In November 1980, US 412 was designated with the route concurrent with Route 84 from Kennett to Hayti. By 2001, a connector was built from Route 84 and US 412 to I-55 and I-155. Part of Route 84 and US 412 in Pemiscot County east of Route A to Hayti Heights was expanded to a multi-lane highway by 2004, and from Kennett to east of Route A by 2010.

== Major intersections ==
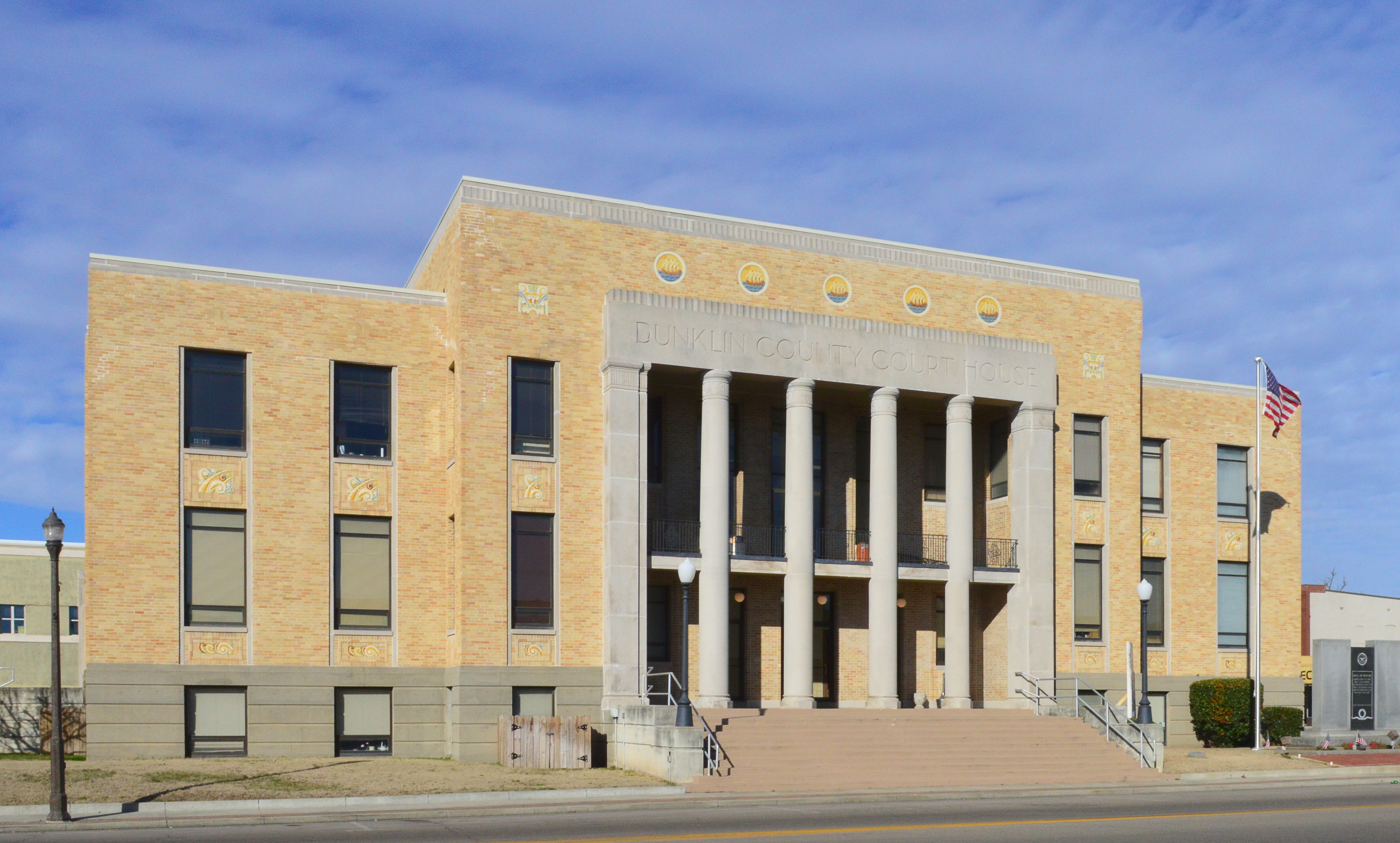
Dunklin County Courthouse on Route 84 in Kennett

County	Location	mi	km	Destinations	Notes
Dunklin		0.000	0.000	AR 90	Arkansas border at St. Francis River, western terminus
Dunklin	Kennett	2.998	4.825	Route O (Southwest Drive) to US 412	Northern terminus of Route O
Dunklin	Kennett	3.044	4.899	Route E (Homecrest Street) to Route 25	Western terminus of Route E
Dunklin	Kennett	4.970– 5.035	7.998– 8.103	US 412	Western end of US 412 concurrency
Dunklin	Kennett	5.100	8.208	Airport Road – Kennett Memorial Airport	
Dunklin	Kennett	5.207– 5.289	8.380– 8.512	Route 25 (Independence Avenue) – Holcomb	Southern terminus of Route 25
Dunklin	Kennett	5.958	9.588	Route Z	Northern terminus of Route Z
Dunklin		7.778	12.517	Route U	Southern terminus of Route U
Dunklin–Pemiscot county line		9.280	14.935	Route NN	Northern terminus of Route NN
Pemiscot		10.278	16.541	Route A – Bragg City	Southern terminus of Route A
Pemiscot		12.901	20.762	Route C – Deering	Northern terminus of Route C
Pemiscot		16.832	27.088	Route B / Route Z – Pascola, Braggadocio	Southern terminus of Route B; Northern terminus of Route Z
Pemiscot		19.321– 19.340	31.094– 31.125	US 412	Eastern end of US 412 concurrency
Pemiscot	Hayti	21.191	34.104	Route P (Third Street)	Southern terminus of Route P
Pemiscot	Hayti	21.662	34.862	Route J – Braggadocio	
Pemiscot	Hayti	22.180– 22.276	35.695– 35.850	I-55 / US 61 – Sikeston, Blytheville, AR	I-55/US 61 Exit 19
Pemiscot		24.261	39.044	Route D	
Pemiscot	Caruthersville	26.623	42.846	Route 84 Spur (Third Street)	Western terminus of Route 84 Spur
Pemiscot	Caruthersville	28.199	45.382	Route U – Stubtown	Eastern terminus of Route U
Pemiscot	Caruthersville	30.098– 30.215	48.438– 48.626	I-155 / US 412 / Route Y – Dyersburg, TN, Hayti	I-155/US 412 Exit 6; Northern terminus of Route Y; Eastern terminus
1.000 mi = 1.609 km; 1.000 km = 0.621 mi: Concurrency terminus

== Route 84 Spur ==
Third Street
- Location: Caruthersville, Missouri
- Length: 0.291 mi (468 m)

A short unsigned spur of Route 84 is located in Caurthersville. Known as Third Street in the city, the route starts at Route 84 and travels southeastward to Grand Avenue and Laurant Avenue. State maintenance ends beyond Laurant Avenue, and the road continues as Third Street. The Caruthersville Water Tower is located southeast of the route's eastern terminus.
