= KNT =

KNT may refer to:

- Kennett Memorial Airport, Missouri, IATA airport code
- Kenton station, London, National Rail station code
- Kyneton railway station, Australia
- The registration table code for Nowy Targ
