= Route 79 (disambiguation) =

Route 79 may refer to:

- London Buses route 79
- Melbourne tram route 79
- M79 (New York City bus), also referred to as the 79th Street bus
- SEPTA Route 79, a former trolleybus line in South Philadelphia

== See also ==
- List of highways numbered 79
