= Tennessee State Route 181 =

State highway in Tennessee, United States

State Route 181
- SR 181; primary in red, secondary in blue

Route information
- Maintained by TDOT
- Length: 25.10 mi (40.39 km)
- Existed: July 1, 1983–present
- Tourist routes: Great River Road

Major junctions
- South end: SR 88 at Hales Point
- I-155 / US 412 near Boothspoint
- North end: SR 79 near Cottonwood Grove

Location
- Country: United States
- State: Tennessee
- Counties: Lauderdale, Dyer, Lake

Highway system
- Tennessee State Routes; Interstate; US; State
← SR 180	→ SR 182

State Route 181 (abbreviated SR 181) is a state highway running through Lake, Dyer, and Lauderdale counties in Tennessee. This highway traverses very sparsely populated areas and is located entirely within the flood plains of the Mississippi River, Obion River and Forked Deer River. SR 181 is constructed as a modern two-lane facility with paved shoulders and a 55 mph (89 km/h) speed limit throughout its length. Prior to its designation as a state highway (and subsequent raising of the levee), it was a narrow gravel road. It is constructed atop the "Big Levee" in Dyer County and is used as a primary defense against floodwaters from the Mississippi River itself, however, floodwaters from the Obion River often back up on the eastern side of the levee. This highway doesn't pass through any municipalities or unincorporated communities. The area is a popular destination for fishermen and hunters.

== Route description ==
The entire length of SR 181 is signed as part of the Great River Road and also carries a Tennessee Scenic Parkway designation. This state route carries both a primary and secondary designation. SR 188 begins at SR 88 and continues north on the levee, where it has an interchange with Interstate 155 (I-155) and U.S. Route 412 (US 412). Here, the road switches from secondary to primary. The highway has its northern terminus several miles later at an intersection with SR 79.

== Major intersections ==
County	Location	mi	km	Destinations	Notes
Lauderdale		0.0	0.0	SR 88 / Great River Road south – Halls, Hales Point	Southern terminus; SR 181 begins as a Secondary Highway
Dyer		11.9	19.2	SR 104 – Finley, Dyersburg	
Dyer		15.4	24.8	I-155 / US 412 – Dyersburg, St. Louis	I-155/US 412 exit 2; SR 181 becomes Primary
Dyer		20.4	32.8	SR 103 – Bogota	
Lake	Cottonwood Grove	25.1	40.4	SR 79 / Great River Road north – Ridgely	Northern terminus; SR 181 ends as a Primary Highway
1.000 mi = 1.609 km; 1.000 km = 0.621 mi
