= Tennessee State Route 182 =

State highway in Tennessee, United States

State Route 182
- Lenox–Nauvoo Road
- SR 182 highlighted in red

Route information
- Maintained by TDOT
- Length: 9.77 mi (15.72 km)
- Existed: July 1, 1983–present

Major junctions
- South end: SR 104 in Finley
- I-155 / US 412 near Lenox
- North end: SR 78 near Dyersburg

Location
- Country: United States
- State: Tennessee
- Counties: Dyer

Highway system
- Tennessee State Routes; Interstate; US; State
← SR 181	→ SR 183

State Route 182 (abbreviated SR 182) is a secondary state highway in western Dyer County in the U.S. state of Tennessee, United States. This route is primarily rural in nature throughout its length.

== Route description ==
The first 2.8 miles (4.5 km) of SR 182 from its southern terminus with SR 104 to Interstate 155 (I-155) is a modern two-lane facility with a 55 mph (90 km/h) speed limit. I-155 ended at Exit 7 during the 1970s and this section of SR 182 also served as a temporary link to SR 104 for eastbound motorists until the freeway was completed to Exit 15. SR 182 north of I-155 to its northern terminus with SR 78 is quite circuitous as the highway winds its way up the Chickasaw Bluff. This section of SR 182 has numerous hills and curves and features narrow roadway width and reduced speed limits. SR 182 is signed as a south–north route, however, the highway actually follows a west–east direction from Lenox to SR 78.

== Major intersections ==
The entire route is in Dyer County.

Location	mi	km	Destinations	Notes
Finley	0.0	0.0	SR 104 – Dyersburg	Southern terminus
	2.8	4.5	I-155 / US 412 – Dyersburg, St. Louis	I-155/US 412 exit 7
	9.8	15.8	SR 78 – Ridgely, Dyersburg	Northern terminus
1.000 mi = 1.609 km; 1.000 km = 0.621 mi

== See also ==
- List of state routes in Tennessee
- List of highways numbered 182
