= List of highways numbered 79 =

The following highways are numbered 79:

== Australia ==
- Calder Highway
- Silver City Highway
- (South Australia)

== Greece ==
- EO79 road

== India ==
- National Highway 79 (India)

== Iran ==
- Road 79

== Israel ==
- Highway 79 (Israel)

== Korea, South ==
- National Route 79
- Gukjido 79

== New Zealand ==
- New Zealand State Highway 79

== Philippines ==
- N79 highway (Philippines)

== United States ==
- Interstate 79
- U.S. Route 79
- Alabama State Route 79
  - County Route 79 (Lee County, Alabama)
- Arizona State Route 79
  - Arizona State Route 79 (former)
  - Arizona State Route 79 (former)
- Arkansas Highway 79 (1926) (former)
- California State Route 79
- Colorado State Highway 79
- Connecticut Route 79
- Florida State Road 79
- Georgia State Route 79
- Idaho State Highway 79
- Illinois Route 79 (former)
- Indiana State Road 79 (former)
- Iowa Highway 79 (former)
- K-79 (Kansas highway)
- Kentucky Route 79
- Maryland Route 79
- Massachusetts Route 79
- M-79 (Michigan highway)
- Minnesota State Highway 79
  - County Road 79 (Scott County, Minnesota)
- Missouri Route 79
- Nebraska Highway 79
  - Nebraska Link 79E
  - Nebraska Spur 79H
- Nevada State Route 79 (former)
- New Jersey Route 79
  - County Route 79 (Bergen County, New Jersey)
  - County Route 79 (Ocean County, New Jersey)
- New York State Route 79
  - County Route 79 (Chautauqua County, New York)
  - County Route 79 (Dutchess County, New York)
  - County Route 79 (Herkimer County, New York)
  - County Route 79 (Madison County, New York)
  - County Route 79 (Montgomery County, New York)
  - County Route 79 (Rensselaer County, New York)
  - County Route 79 (Suffolk County, New York)
    - County Route 79A (Suffolk County, New York)
  - County Route 79 (Warren County, New York)
- North Carolina Highway 79
- Ohio State Route 79
- Oklahoma State Highway 79
- Pennsylvania Route 79
- South Carolina Highway 79
- South Dakota Highway 79
- Tennessee State Route 79
- Texas State Highway 79
  - Texas State Highway Loop 79
  - Farm to Market Road 79
- Utah State Route 79
- Virginia State Route 79
- West Virginia Route 79 (1920s) (former)
- Wisconsin Highway 79

Territories

- U.S. Virgin Islands Highway 79

== See also ==
- A79

Preceded by 78	Lists of highways 79	Succeeded by 80
