= Tennessee State Route 212 =

State highway in Tennessee, United States

State Route 212
- SR 212 highlighted in red

Route information
- Maintained by TDOT
- Length: 2.4 mi (3.9 km)
- Existed: July 1, 1983–present

Major junctions
- West end: SR 22 in Tiptonville
- East end: SR 78 northeast of Tiptonville

Location
- Country: United States
- State: Tennessee
- Counties: Lake

Highway system
- Tennessee State Routes; Interstate; US; State
← SR 211	→ SR 213

State Route 212 (SR 212) is a 2.4-mile-long (3.9 km) state highway in Lake County in the northwestern portion of the U.S. state of Tennessee. It provides access to the Tennessee Department of Correction's Northwest Correctional Complex.

== Route description ==
SR 212 begins in Tiptonville city limits, (but north of downtown) at an intersection with SR 22. It travels to the west to an entrance to the Northwest Correctional Complex and then, at a steep curve, it turns south. Then, at another steep curve, it turns back west and travels in front of the Northwest Correctional Complex. At a three-way intersection, SR 212 turns south again and continues southerly until it meets its eastern terminus, an intersection with SR 78 northeast of Tiptonville.

== Major intersections ==
The entire route is in Lake County.

Location	mi	km	Destinations	Notes
Tiptonville	0.00	0.00	SR 22 (Cedar Street) – Tiptonville, Kentucky Bend	Western terminus
	2.4	3.9	SR 78 – Tiptonville, Hickman, KY	Eastern terminus
1.000 mi = 1.609 km; 1.000 km = 0.621 mi

== See also ==
- List of state routes in Tennessee
