= Veda Brown =

American singer

- Also known as: Mildred Whitehorn
- Born: Mildred Pulliam; December 11, 1949 (age 76); Hayti, Missouri, US
- Genres: R&B, soul, gospel
- Occupations: Singer, choir leader, cosmetologist, teacher
- Years active: c.1970 onwards
- Labels: Stax, Raken, Rav

Mildred Pulliam Whitehorn (born December 11, 1949) is an American gospel and former R&B singer, who performed and recorded in the 1970s under the stage name Veda Brown. Her most successful record was "Short Stopping" in 1973.

== Life and career ==
Mildred Pulliam was born and raised in Hayti, Missouri, the granddaughter of sharecroppers and the daughter of a local welder and church pastor. Her father's family were musical, and sang both blues and gospel music. Mildred grew up singing gospel music, and first sang solo in her church at the age of 6.

She sang for a time with a rock band, The Decisions, and was encouraged by local radio station owner Larry Robinson to start a solo career in rhythm and blues music. He won her a contract with Stax Records in 1971, and she took the stage name of Veda Brown – Brown being her mother's maiden name, and Veda being picked at random in a sweepstake organised by the Stax office secretaries. Her first record, "Living A Life Without Love", was released by Stax in May 1972, and was followed by "I Know It's Not Right (To Be in Love with a Married Man)", recorded like many of her singles at Muscle Shoals, Alabama. In 1973, her third single, "Short Stopping", written by Mack Rice, Bobby Manuel and Bettye Crutcher, and produced by Henry Rush and John Wesley, became her most successful release, reaching No. 34 on the Billboard R&B chart. Her follow-up single, "Don't Start Lovin' Me (If You're Gonna Stop)", described as "one of the heaviest pieces of soul put out by Stax in the 70s", also made the R&B chart, reaching # 87 in early 1974. She performed and toured extensively during the period, on one occasion sharing top billing with Johnnie Taylor.

However, Stax Records fell into serious financial difficulties around this time, and her contract lapsed. Some of her recordings for Stax were issued by former company staff member John Wesley Smith on the small Raken label in 1975, but these were poorly distributed and were unsuccessful. In 1977, Larry Robinson paid for her final Memphis session, producing the single "Play Brother, Play Sister" / "I Had A Fight With Love" on the Rav label, but again this failed to make the charts.

She returned to Missouri, married James Whitehorn, had a family, and worked as a cosmetologist. A member of the Church of God in Christ, she also became well known as a gospel singer and choir leader, at one time leading a choir of over 100 which won a contest on BET (Black Entertainment Television). Particularly influenced by the music and work of Mahalia Jackson, she has continued to perform and teach gospel music in Missouri's Bootheel area. In the 1990s she was chosen to participate as a master artist in Missouri's Traditional Arts Apprenticeship Program. In 2006 she directed a Black History Month program in celebration of black history at Kennett High School.

A number of her 1970s recordings, including some previously unissued, were released on a CD shared with Judy Clay, Judy Clay & Veda Brown – The Stax Solo Recordings, on Kent Records in 2008.

== Discography ==
=== Singles ===
- "Living A Life Without Love" / "Take It Off Her (And Put It On Me)" (Stax 0123, 1972)
- "I Know It's Not Right (To Be in Love with a Married Man)" / "Don't Let The Green Grass Fool You" (Stax 0143, 1972)
- "Short Stopping" / "I Can See Every Woman's Man But Mine" (Stax 0163, 1973) (Billboard R&B chart #34)
- "Don't Start Loving Me (If You're Gonna Stop)" / "Fever" (Stax 194, 1974) (R&B chart # 87)
- "Brand New Tomorrow" / "Shoutin' Out Love" (Raken 001, 1975)
- "I'm Loving Him Right" / "Trip" (Raken 002, 1975)
- "Play Brother, Play Sister" / "I Had A Fight With Love" (Rav 16, 1977)
