= Caruthersville Bridge =

Bridge in Missouri and Tennessee, United States

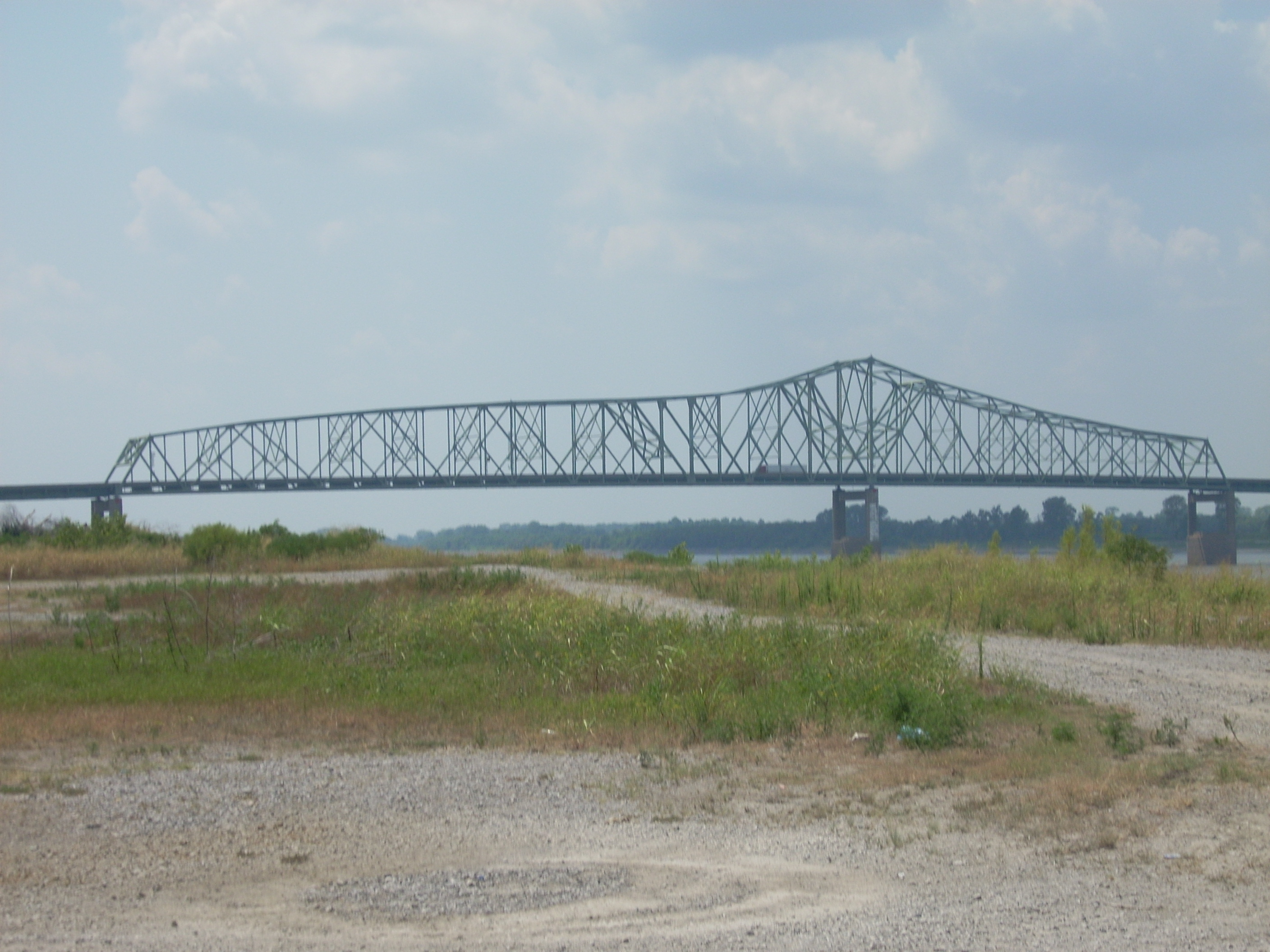
- Coordinates: 36°06′54″N 89°36′47″W
- Carries: 4 lanes of I-155 / US 412
- Crosses: Mississippi River
- Locale: Caruthersville, Missouri and Dyersburg, Tennessee
- Maintained by: Tennessee Department of Transportation
- ID number: 23I01550001

Characteristics
- Design: Cantilever bridge
- Total length: 7,102 feet (2,165 m)
- Width: 78 feet (24 m)
- Longest span: 920 feet (280 m) and 520 feet (158 m)
- Clearance below: 99 feet (30 m)

History
- Opened: December 1, 1976

Statistics
- Daily traffic: 9,900

Location
- Interactive map of Caruthersville Bridge

The Caruthersville Bridge is a single tower cantilever bridge carrying Interstate 155 and U.S. Route 412 across the Mississippi River between Caruthersville, Missouri, and Dyersburg, Tennessee. Completed in 1976, it is the only bridge that connects Missouri and Tennessee, and the northernmost bridge on the Lower Mississippi River. It stands downstream of the Cairo Mississippi River Bridge and upstream of the Hernando de Soto Bridge.

== History ==
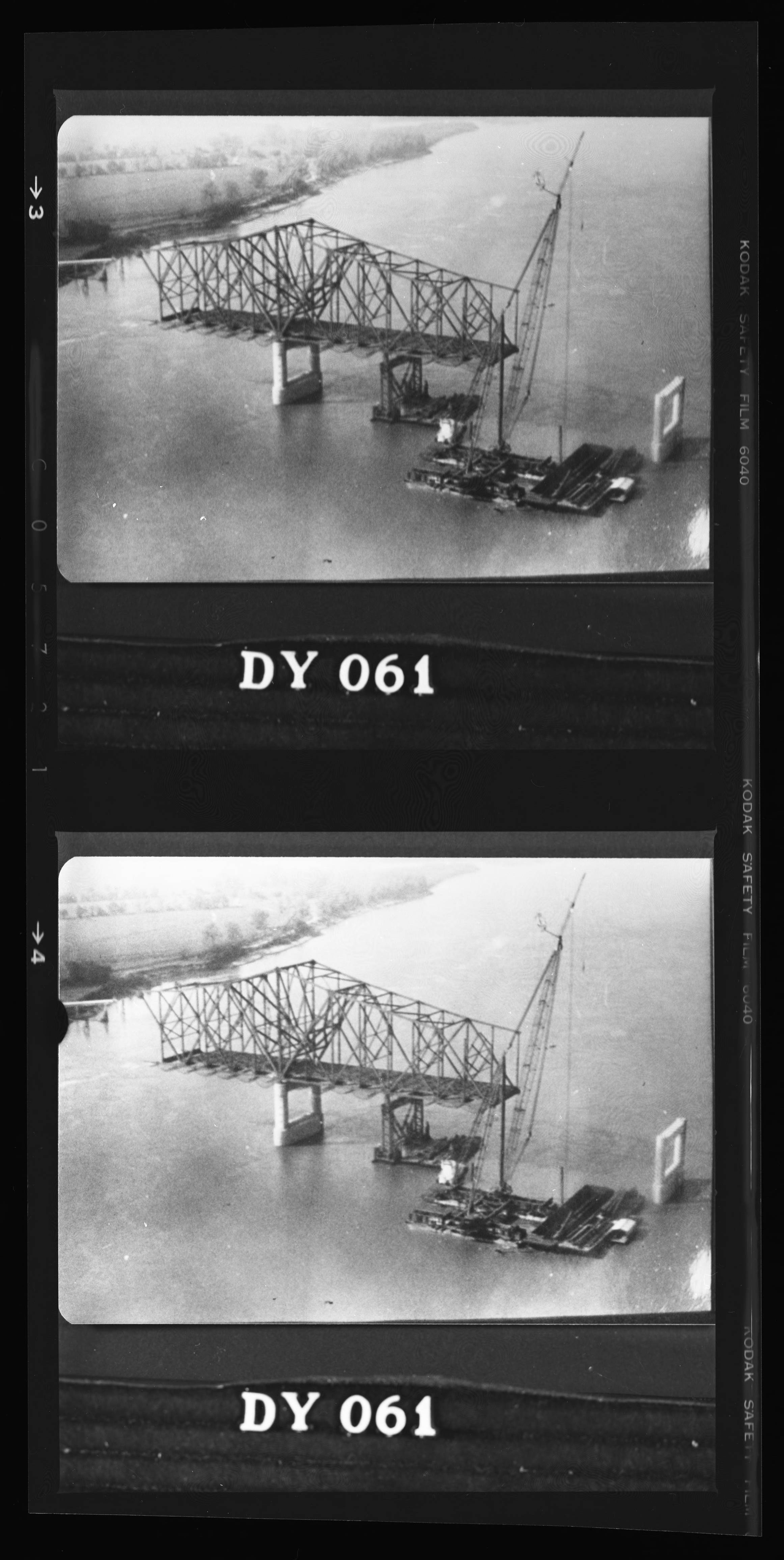
View of construction of the Bridge

The bridge was first proposed in the late 1930s. A committee was created by both state legislatures to study the possibility of constructing the bridge in 1949. The site was chosen by the commission on November 18, 1952, which was subsequently approved by the Army Corps of Engineers on August 20, 1953. Construction of the bridge began in March 1969. The bridge cost US$25,800,000 (equivalent to $145,973,684 in 2025) and was opened on December 1, 1976, in a ceremony by Missouri Governor Kit Bond and Tennessee Governor Ray Blanton. It is the only bridge to cross the Mississippi River between Cairo, Illinois and Memphis, Tennessee, though the Dorena–Hickman Ferry also crosses the Mississippi in this area. It is also the only bridge to connect the states of Missouri and Tennessee directly. Interstate 155 connects Dyersburg, Tennessee (and the proposed Interstate 69) with Interstate 55 near Caruthersville, Missouri and Hayti, Missouri. U.S. Route 412, when created in 1982, was routed across the bridge.

== See also ==
- List of crossings of the Lower Mississippi River
- Delaware Memorial Bridge, only Delaware River crossing between New Jersey and Delaware
