= Hayti Heights, Missouri =

- City
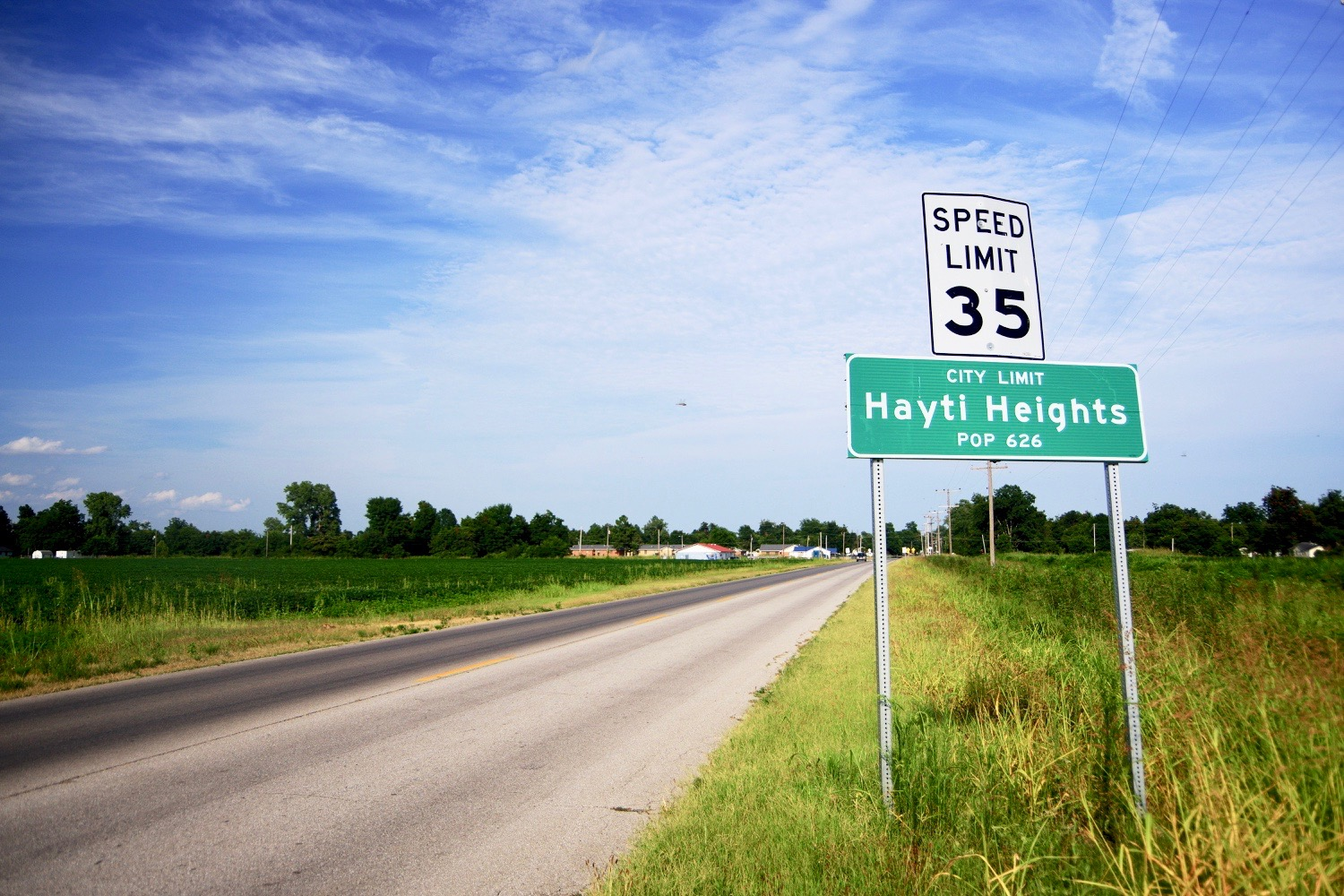
- Route 84 in Hayti Heights

- Location of Hayti Heights, Missouri
- Coordinates: 36°13′52″N 89°46′06″W
- Country: United States
- State: Missouri
- County: Pemiscot

Area
  - Total: 0.98 sq mi (2.54 km^{2})
  - Land: 0.98 sq mi (2.54 km^{2})
  - Water: 0 sq mi (0.00 km^{2})
- Elevation: 266 ft (81 m)

Population (2020)
  - Total: 515
  - Density: 525.2/sq mi (202.77/km^{2})
- Time zone: UTC-6 (Central (CST))
  - Summer (DST): UTC-5 (CDT)
- ZIP code: 63851
- Area code: 573
- FIPS code: 29-31168
- GNIS feature ID: 2394337

Hayti Heights is a city in eastern Pemiscot County in the bootheel of southeast Missouri, United States. The population was 515 at the 2020 census.

== Geography ==
Hayti Heights lies immediately west of Hayti in eastern Pemiscot County. Missouri Route 84 traverses Hayti Heights from west-to-east. U.S. Route 412 passes through the southern tip of the city.

According to the United States Census Bureau, the city has a total area of 0.98 square miles (2.54 km^{2}), all land.

== Demographics ==
Historical population
Census	Pop.	Note	%±
1980	1,023		—
1990	893		−12.7%
2000	771		−13.7%
2010	626		−18.8%
2020	515		−17.7%
U.S. Decennial Census

Hayti Heights city, Missouri – Racial and ethnic composition Note: the US Census treats Hispanic/Latino as an ethnic category. This table excludes Latinos from the racial categories and assigns them to a separate category. Hispanics/Latinos may be of any race.
Race / Ethnicity (NH = Non-Hispanic)	Pop 2000	Pop 2010	Pop 2020	% 2000	% 2010	% 2020
White alone (NH)	5	7	28	0.65%	1.12%	5.44%
Black or African American alone (NH)	758	614	460	98.31%	98.08%	89.32%
Native American or Alaska Native alone (NH)	0	1	3	0.00%	0.16%	0.58%
Asian alone (NH)	3	0	0	0.39%	0.00%	0.00%
Pacific Islander alone (NH)	0	0	0	0.00%	0.00%	0.00%
Other race alone (NH)	0	0	1	0.00%	0.00%	0.19%
Mixed race or Multiracial (NH)	5	2	14	0.65%	0.32%	2.72%
Hispanic or Latino (any race)	0	2	9	0.00%	0.32%	1.75%
Total	771	626	515	100.00%	100.00%	100.00%

=== 2010 census ===
As of the census of 2010, there were 626 people, 210 households, and 150 families living in the city. The population density was 638.8 inhabitants per square mile (246.6/km^{2}). There were 244 housing units at an average density of 249.0 per square mile (96.1/km^{2}). The racial makeup of the city was 1.12% White, 98.40% Black or African American, 0.16% Native American, and 0.32% from two or more races. Hispanic or Latino of any race were 0.32% of the population.

There were 210 households, of which 51.0% had children under the age of 18 living with them, 15.2% were married couples living together, 50.5% had a female householder with no husband present, 5.7% had a male householder with no wife present, and 28.6% were non-families. 25.7% of all households were made up of individuals, and 8.6% had someone living alone who was 65 years of age or older. The average household size was 2.98 and the average family size was 3.61.

The median age in the city was 22.8 years. 41.9% of residents were under the age of 18; 10.7% were between the ages of 18 and 24; 20.4% were from 25 to 44; 18.6% were from 45 to 64; and 8.1% were 65 years of age or older. The gender makeup of the city was 45.7% male and 54.3% female.

=== 2000 census ===
As of the census of 2000, there were 771 people, 254 households, and 183 families living in the city. The population density was 780.0 inhabitants per square mile (301.2/km^{2}). There were 287 housing units at an average density of 290.4 per square mile (112.1/km^{2}). The racial makeup of the city was 0.65% White, 98.31% African American, 0.39% Asian, and 0.65% from two or more races.

There were 254 households, out of which 46.9% had children under the age of 18 living with them, 19.3% were married couples living together, 49.6% had a female householder with no husband present, and 27.6% were non-families. 24.0% of all households were made up of individuals, and 9.1% had someone living alone who was 65 years of age or older. The average household size was 3.04 and the average family size was 3.64.

In the city, the population was spread out, with 44.7% under the age of 18, 9.9% from 18 to 24, 22.7% from 25 to 44, 13.5% from 45 to 64, and 9.2% who were 65 years of age or older. The median age was 21 years. For every 100 females there were 72.9 males. For every 100 females age 18 and over, there were 62.0 males.

The median income for a household in the city was $12,011, and the median income for a family was $15,417. Males had a median income of $23,750 versus $16,786 for females. The per capita income for the city was $6,398. About 55.5% of families and 57.7% of the population were below the poverty line, including 67.1% of those under age 18 and 40.7% of those age 65 or over.

== Education ==
It is in the Hayti R-II School District.

Three Rivers College's service area includes Pemiscot County.
