= Tennessee State Route 213 =

State road in Tennessee, USA

State Route 213
- Grays Camp Road; Phillippy Road
- SR 213 highlighted in red

Route information
- Maintained by TDOT
- Length: 3.6 mi (5.8 km)
- Existed: July 1, 1983–present

Major junctions
- West end: SR 78 just south of Phillippy
- East end: Reelfoot Lake Airport

Location
- Country: United States
- State: Tennessee
- Counties: Lake

Highway system
- Tennessee State Routes; Interstate; US; State
← SR 212	→ SR 214

State Route 213 (SR 213), also known as Grays Camp Road and Phillippy Road, is a short 3.6 miles long east–west state highway in northeastern Lake County, Tennessee. It provides access to many homes, marinas, businesses, and camps along the shores of Reelfoot Lake, as well as the Reelfoot Lake Airport.

== Route description ==
SR 213 begins as Grays Camp Road just south of the community of Phillippy at an intersection with SR 78. It goes southeast through farmland for a couple of miles before arriving at some lakeside camps, such as Gray’s Camp, where it turns northeast along Phillippy Road. For the next mile or so, SR 213 travels along the banks of Reelfoot Lake, passing by many lakeside homes, camps, businesses, and marinas, before turning more northward away from the lake and coming to an end at the main entrance of Reelfoot Lake Airport. The Phillippy Road portion of the highway stays no more than a half-mile west of the Obion County line at all times. The entire route of SR 213 is a two-lane highway.

== Major intersections ==
The entire route is in Lake County.

Location	mi	km	Destinations	Notes
	0.0	0.0	SR 78 – Tiptonville, Hickman, KY	Western terminus
	3.6	5.8	Dead end at Reelfoot Lake Airport main entrance	Eastern terminus
1.000 mi = 1.609 km; 1.000 km = 0.621 mi
