= Hernando de Soto Bridge =

Steel-arch bridge between West Memphis, Arkansas, and Memphis, Tennessee, US

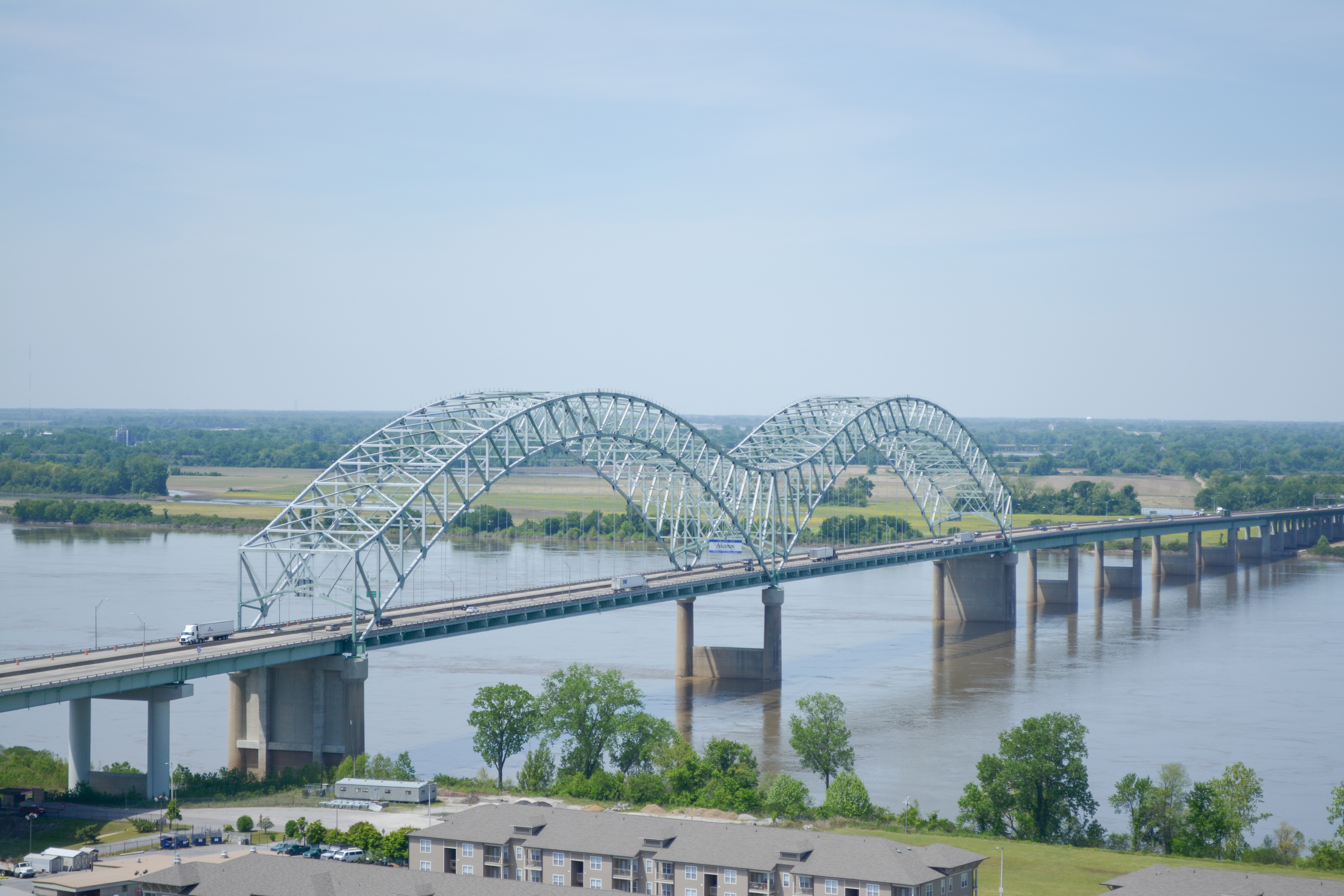
- Hernando de Soto Bridge photographed from the Memphis Pyramid
- Coordinates: 35°09′10″N 90°03′50″W
- Carries: 6 lanes of I-40
- Crosses: Mississippi River
- Locale: Memphis, Tennessee, and West Memphis, Arkansas
- Other name(s): The M Bridge, Memphis Bridge, Mississippi Bridge, New Bridge
- Maintained by: TDOT and ARDOT
- ID number: 79I00400001

Characteristics
- Design: tied arch, through arch
- Material: Steel
- Pier construction: Concrete
- Total length: 9,432.6 feet (2,875 m)
- Width: 90 feet (27 m)
- Longest span: 900 feet (274 m)
- Clearance below: 109 feet (33 m)

History
- Construction start: May 2, 1967; 59 years ago
- Opened: August 2, 1973; 53 years ago

Statistics
- Daily traffic: 43,882 (2025)

Location
- Interactive map of Hernando de Soto Bridge

The Hernando de Soto Bridge is a tied-arch bridge carrying Interstate 40 across the Mississippi River between West Memphis, Arkansas, and Memphis, Tennessee. The design is a continuous cantilevered cable-stayed steel through arch, with bedstead endposts. Memphians also call the bridge the "New Bridge", as it is newer than the Memphis & Arkansas Bridge (carrying Interstate 55) downstream, and the "M Bridge", due to its distinctive double-arch shape. It is of similar construction to the Sherman Minton Bridge between Louisville, Kentucky, and New Albany, Indiana (except that it consists of a single level deck).

== History ==
=== Planning and construction ===
Preliminary planning for the river crossing began in 1960 as part of Interstate 40 alignment studies for the Memphis - Little Rock corridor, which was constructed in segments between 1963 and 1968. Before the Hernando de Soto Bridge was completed, traffic going across the river was carried across the Mississippi River by the Interstate 55/US Route 64/70/79/61 Memphis & Arkansas Bridge crossing, located 2 miles (3.2 km) southwest.

The two states initially feuded over the cost of paying for the bridge. Tennessee officials believed that both states should equally pay for the bridge, while Arkansas officials wanted Tennessee to shoulder a much larger share of the cost due to Tennessee's larger population. Both states eventually agreed to a compromise where Tennessee funded 60% of the cost and Arkansas the remaining 40%. Both states also initially disagreed on the design of the bridge; the original design called for longer through arches and a lower vertical clearance.

Construction of the Hernando de Soto Bridge began on May 2, 1967. Initially planned for completion in 1971, the project experienced multiple delays. The double-arch bridge was opened to automobile traffic on August 2, 1973. A dedication ceremony for the bridge occurred on August 17, 1973. Initially expected to be only $12 million (equivalent to $82.4 million in 2025), the final price tag was approximately $57 million (equivalent to $306 million in 2025).

The bridge is named for 16th century Spanish explorer Hernando de Soto, who explored this stretch of the Mississippi River and died south of Memphis.

=== Lighting ===
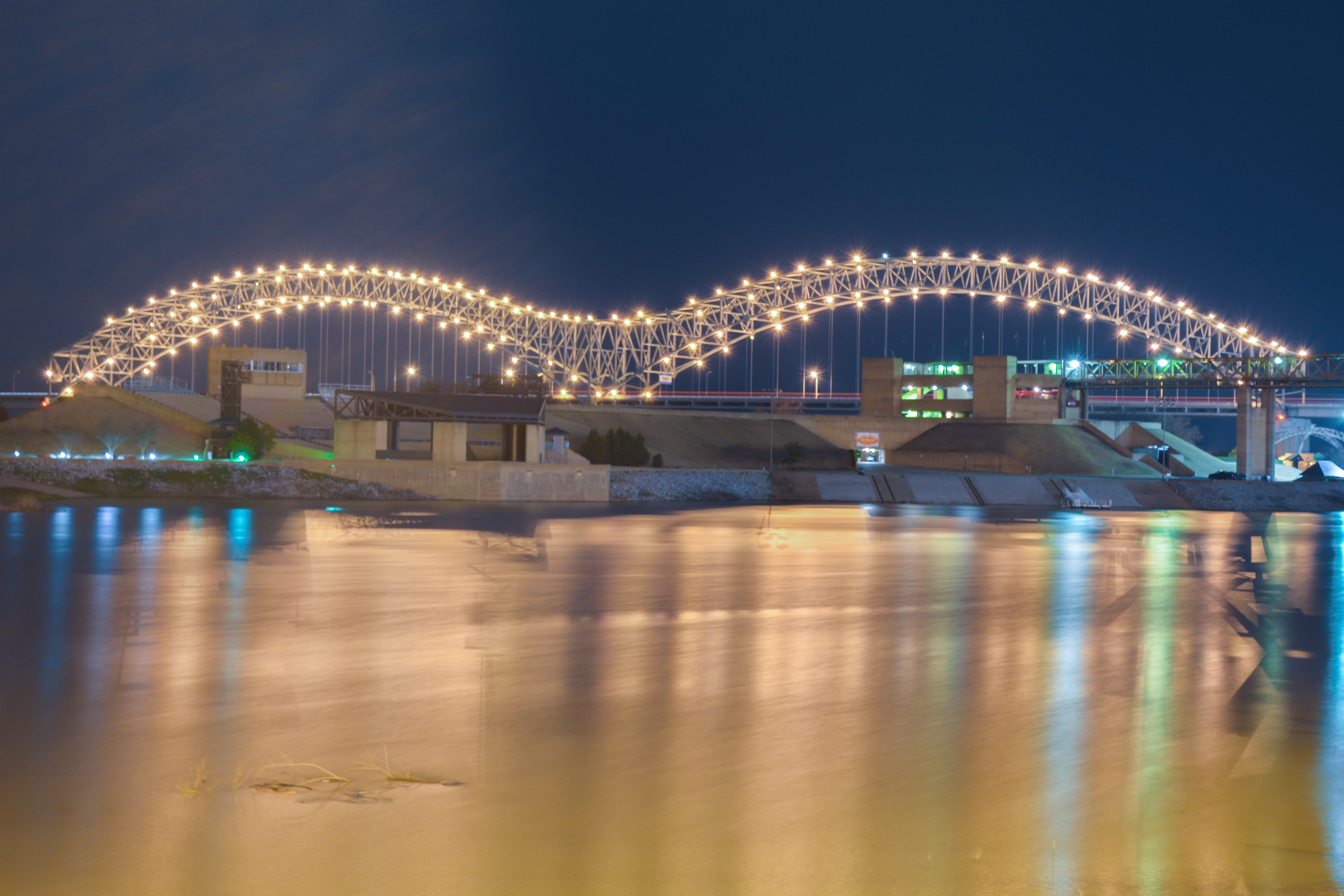
Hernando de Soto Bridge illuminated at night in 2015

At night, the bridge was illuminated by 200 high-pressure sodium vapor lights along its "M" structure. The bridge was first illuminated on September 5, 1986, after $373,000 of private funds had been raised to fund the cost and installation of the lights. Due to some river traffic having issues with the lights at night reflecting on the water, the city installed a remote switch to toggle the lights on and off briefly while the vessel passes under the bridge. During the 2011 Mississippi River floods, the bridge became dark for about 2 months because the transformers that supply the electricity for the lights were removed to prevent damage to them by flood waters. The bridge was re-lit in a ceremony which occurred on June 21, 2011.

After the debut of the pedestrian/cycling Big River Crossing and accompanying new LED lighting system on the nearby Harahan Bridge in 2016, it was announced that the existing sodium vapor lights along the Hernando de Soto Bridge would be replaced with a new LED lighting display, thus making the Hernando de Soto the second Mississippi River bridge to feature such a display. The new system can be synchronized with the Harahan Bridge and display various color patterns for special occasions or requests. Both displays have been created under an initiative called "Mighty Lights." The $14 million privately funded project was completed in 2018.

=== 21st century and seismic retrofit ===
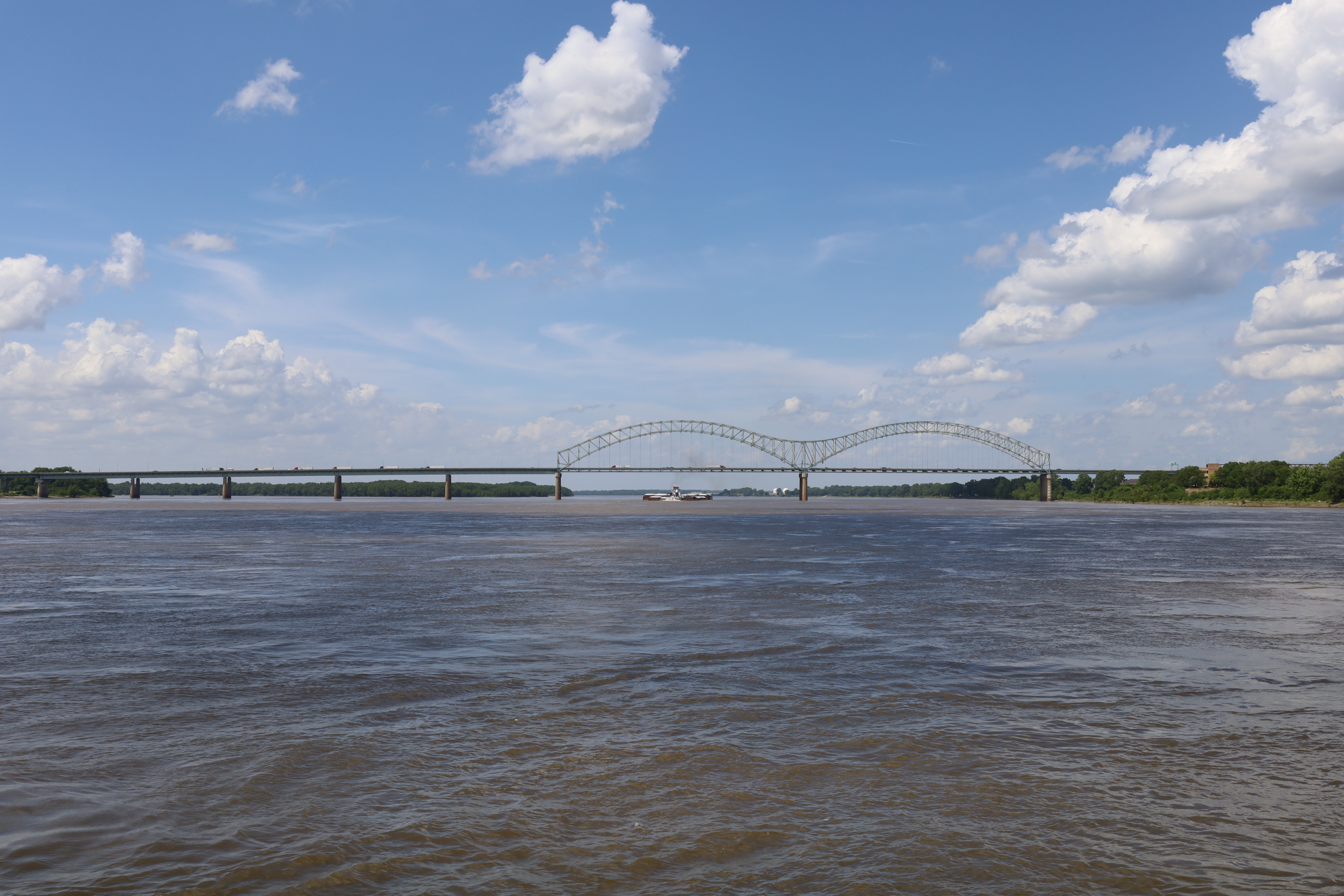
View from the river in 2022

On August 23, 2007, an inspector discovered that a bridge pier on the approach bridge west of the river had settled overnight, and the bridge was subsequently closed to perform a precautionary inspection. The bridge was reopened later that day.

Between 2000 and 2015, the bridge underwent a seismic retrofitting project, allowing it to withstand a 7.7 magnitude earthquake, the similar magnitude of earthquakes during the 1811–12 New Madrid earthquakes. The retrofit project is also a means to protect the bridge as it is located within 100 miles (161 km) of the New Madrid Seismic Zone and serves as a major cargo route and traffic thoroughfare across the river. As part of this project, the main span, approaches, and ramps for the downtown exit were retrofitted. A bridge about 1 mile (1.6 km) west of the main span was rebuilt with earthquake considerations in mind. The federal government covered 80% of the cost, with Tennessee contributing 12% and Arkansas 8%.

==== 2021 girder fracture ====
Aerial shot of the beam fracture, taken May 11, 2021

On May 11, 2021, an inspection discovered a partially fractured tie girder on the Span A North truss. Two of the four plates comprising the box-shaped tension tie member were completely fractured and the bottom plate was partially fractured, leaving only the inside-facing plate intact. Since the severely compromised girder was one of a pair of load-bearing tension members that were critical to the structural integrity of the bridge's tied-arch design, the bridge was structurally unsound and at risk of collapse. The inspecting engineer called 9-1-1 and told authorities to shut down the bridge immediately. Vehicular traffic across the bridge and river traffic under the bridge were halted while engineers inspected the entire bridge for other issues, and analyzed the structure.

River traffic under the bridge resumed three days later on May 14. Initial repairs that affixed steel plates on both sides of the affected girder were completed on May 25. The second phase consisted of the installation of additional steel plating and removal of part of the damaged beam. A new inspection of the bridge found "nothing of concern". The eastbound lanes reopened on July 31, 2021, the westbound lanes on August 2, 2021. During the closure, vehicle traffic utilized the nearby Memphis & Arkansas Bridge (I-55) as an alternate route in the Memphis area, as well as the Caruthersville Bridge (I-155) to the north and the Helena Bridge (US 49) to the south as alternates elsewhere in the Mid-South.

Investigators received amateur photos taken from the river below as early as 2016 that already showed damage at the same site. And according to the Arkansas Department of Transportation, review of archived drone footage taken during a May 2019 bridge inspection, two years before the damage was discovered, also showed the fracture. The department further found that the mandated hands-on—that is, within arm's length—inspections that should have occurred every two years had not been undertaken. The responsible inspector was subsequently fired.

An engineering analysis revealed the fracture was the result of two particularly wide and poorly done weld repairs in the same spot during "fabrication" (construction) that, along with other poor welds elsewhere on the bridge, had been identified and repaired; there were consequently no further concerns.

Key findings of the report included the following four points:

• Metallographic examination of the fracture surfaces identified two weld repairs from fabrication that were much wider and contained weld metal deposit sequencing that differed from other side plate thickness transition welds in the bridge.

• The weld repairs caused two large hydrogen cracks as a result of the inherent restraint, improper preheat and/or use of contaminated welding electrodes commonly associated with weld repairs performed without a fracture control plan.
[....]
• Other hydrogen cracks were identified on the interior tie girder surface at similar thickness transitions throughout the bridge. These hydrogen cracks were comparatively shallow (<3/16 in [4.8 mm].), and those observed cracks tended to travel as intergranular cracks through the GCHAZ [grain coarsened heat affected zone] until they arrested in material with lower hardness and greater toughness and hydrogen tolerance.
[....]
• Given the 48-year service life of this structure, the fact that the subject fracture occurred in three separate phases over several years, the recent inspection efforts to identify welding defects at the tie girder thickness transition welds, and no evidence of observed fatigue crack growth during this study, it is highly unlikely that an additional major fracture of a similar tie girder thickness transition weld will occur.

== Gallery ==
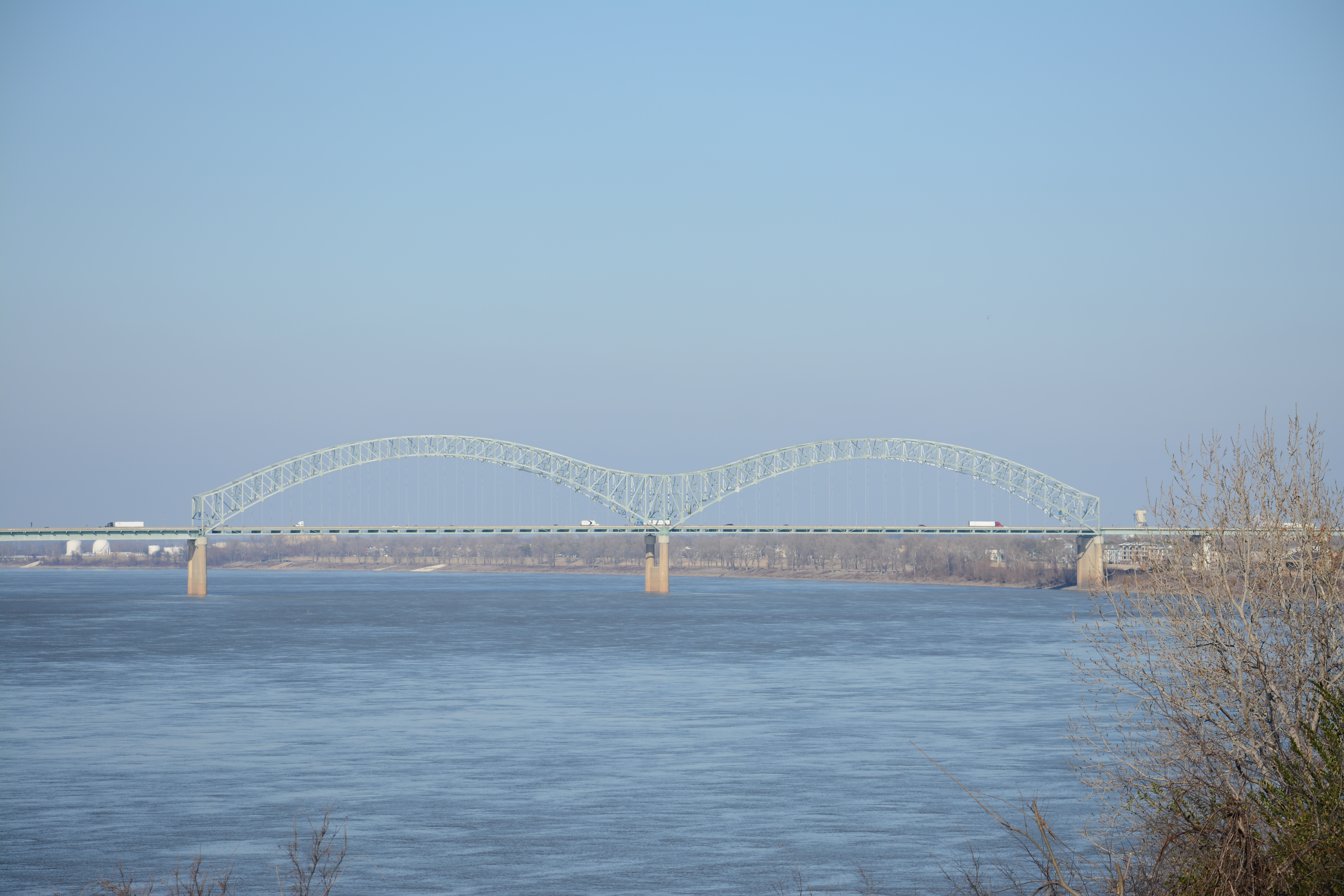
Hernando de Soto Bridge from Martyrs Park in Memphis

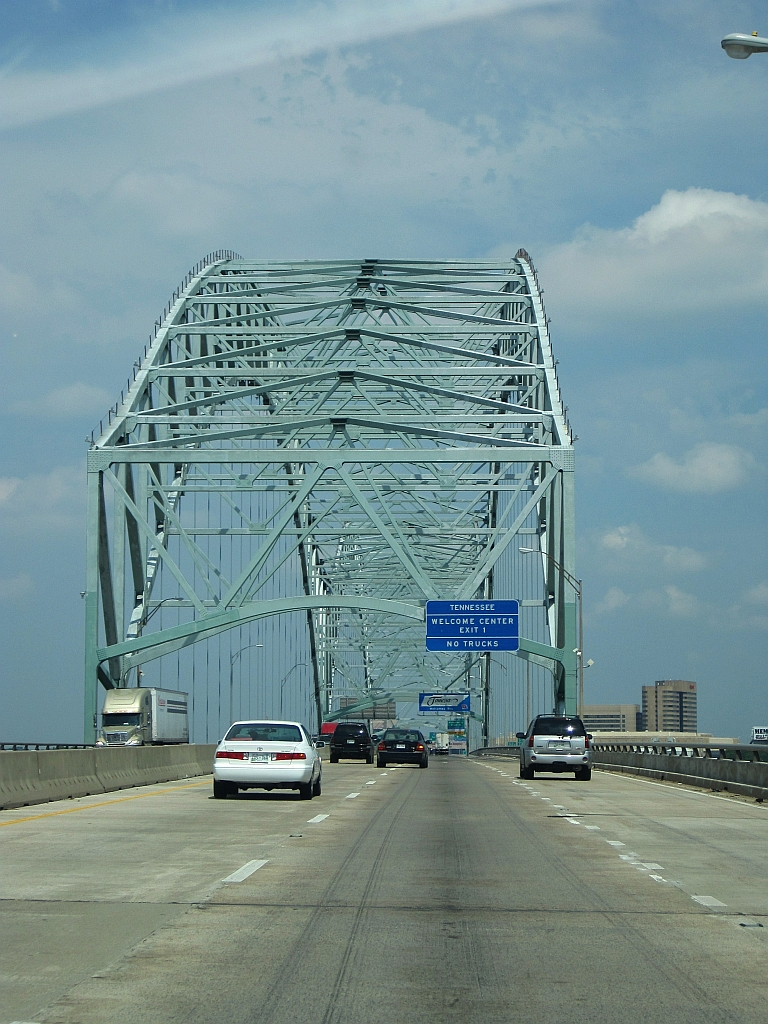
Crossing into Memphis on the Hernando de Soto Bridge

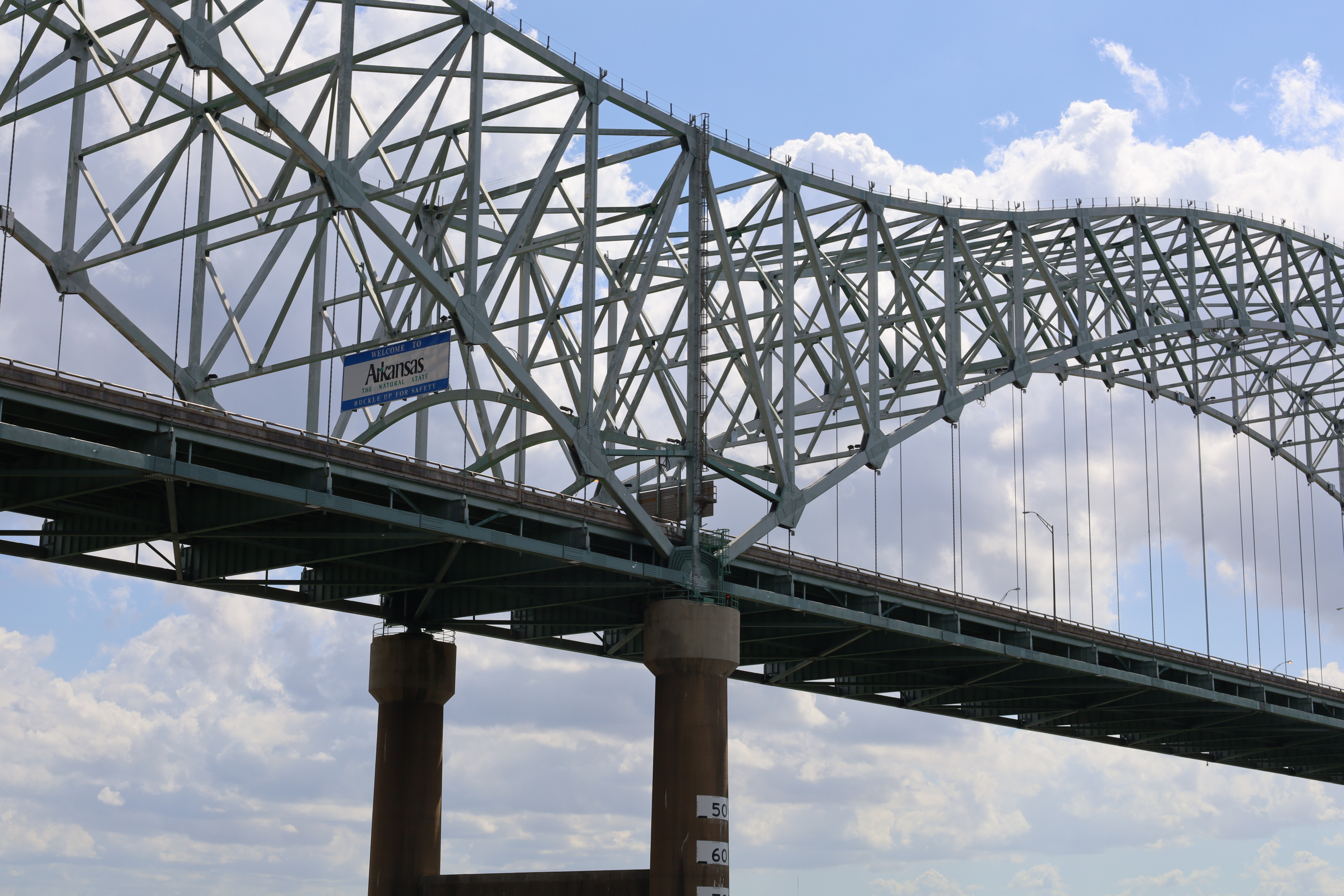
View up from the river

Arkansas welcome sign

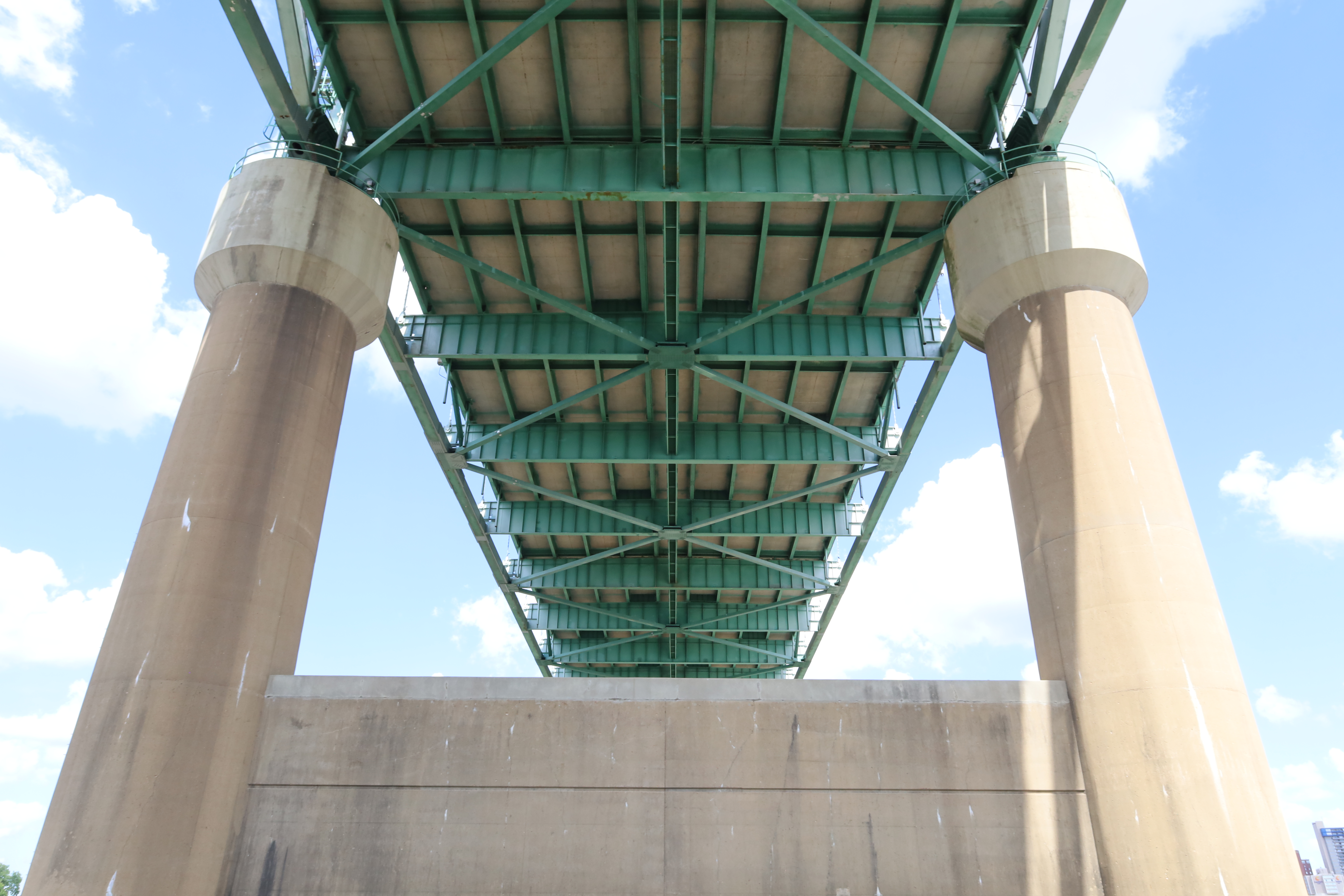
Underside of the bridge

== See also ==
- List of crossings of the Lower Mississippi River
