= List of highways numbered 78 =

The following highways are numbered 78:

== International ==
- AH78 Asian Highway 78
- E78 European route E78

== Australia ==
- Waterfall Way – New South Wales State Route B78

== China ==
- G78 Expressway

== Greece ==
- EO78 road

== Iran ==
- Road 78

== Korea, South ==
- Gukjido 78

== New Zealand ==
- New Zealand State Highway 78 – New Zealand's shortest State Highway

== Philippines ==
- N78 highway (Philippines)

== United States ==
- Interstate 78
- U.S. Route 78
- Alabama State Route 78
  - County Route 78 (Lee County, Alabama)
- Arizona State Route 78
- Arkansas Highway 78
- California State Route 78
- Colorado State Highway 78
- Connecticut Route 78
- Florida State Road 78
  - County Road 78 (Glades County, Florida)
    - County Road 78A (Glades County, Florida)
    - County Road 78B (Glades County, Florida)
  - County Road 78 (Hendry County, Florida)
    - County Road 78A (Hendry County, Florida)
  - County Road 78 (Lee County, Florida)
    - County Road 78A (Lee County, Florida)
- Georgia State Route 78
- Hawaii Route 78
- Idaho State Highway 78
- Illinois Route 78
- Iowa Highway 78
- K-78 (Kansas highway)
- Kentucky Route 78
- Louisiana Highway 78
- Maryland Route 78 (former)
- Massachusetts Route 78
- M-78 (Michigan highway)
- Minnesota State Highway 78
  - County Road 78 (Ramsey County, Minnesota)
  - County Road 78 (Scott County, Minnesota)
- Missouri Route 78
  - Missouri Route 78 (1922) (former)
- Montana Highway 78
- Nebraska Highway 78
  - Nebraska Spur 78B
  - Nebraska Spur 78C
  - Nebraska Spur 78D
  - Nebraska Spur 78E
  - Nebraska Spur 78F
  - Nebraska Spur 78H
  - Nebraska Spur 78J
  - Nebraska Recreation Road 78K
- Nevada State Route 78 (former)
- New Hampshire Route 78
- County Route 78 (Bergen County, New Jersey)
- New Mexico State Road 78
- New York State Route 78
  - County Route 78 (Chemung County, New York)
  - County Route 78 (Dutchess County, New York)
  - County Route 78 (Herkimer County, New York)
  - County Route 78 (Jefferson County, New York)
  - County Route 78 (Lewis County, New York)
  - County Route 78 (Madison County, New York)
  - County Route 78 (Monroe County, New York)
  - County Route 78 (Montgomery County, New York)
  - County Route 78 (Niagara County, New York)
  - County Route 78 (Orange County, New York)
  - County Route 78 (Steuben County, New York)
  - County Route 78 (Suffolk County, New York)
  - County Route 78 (Warren County, New York)
- North Carolina Highway 78
- Ohio State Route 78
- Oklahoma State Highway 78
- Oregon Route 78
- Pennsylvania Route 78 (former)
- Rhode Island Route 78
- Tennessee State Route 78
- Texas State Highway 78
  - Texas State Highway Spur 78
  - Farm to Market Road 78
  - Urban Road 78 (signed as Farm to Market Road 78)
- Utah State Route 78
- Vermont Route 78
- Virginia State Route 78
- Wisconsin Highway 78
- Wyoming Highway 78

Territories

- U.S. Virgin Islands Highway 78

== See also ==
- A78 road

Preceded by 77	Lists of highways 78	Succeeded by 79
