= List of highways numbered 182 =

The following highways are numbered 182:

== Canada ==
- Prince Edward Island Route 182

== Ireland ==
- R182 road (Ireland)

== Japan ==
- Japan National Route 182

== United Kingdom ==
- B182 road
- A182 road

== United States ==
- Interstate 182
- Alabama State Route 182
- California State Route 182
- Connecticut Route 182
  - Connecticut Route 182A
- Florida State Road 182
- Georgia State Route 182
- Hawaii Route 182
- Illinois Route 182 (former)
- Iowa Highway 182
- K-182 (Kansas highway)
- Kentucky Route 182
- Louisiana Highway 182
- Maine State Route 182
- Maryland Route 182
- Mississippi Highway 182
- New Jersey Route 182
- New Mexico State Road 182
- New York State Route 182
- North Carolina Highway 182
- Ohio State Route 182
- Oregon Route 182
- Pennsylvania Route 182
- South Carolina Highway 182
- Tennessee State Route 182
- Texas State Highway 182
  - Texas State Highway Loop 182
  - Farm to Market Road 182 (Texas)
- Utah State Route 182 (former)
- Virginia State Route 182
- Wisconsin Highway 182

Territories

- Puerto Rico Highway 182

Preceded by 181	Lists of highways 182	Succeeded by 183
