= Hayti, Missouri =

- City
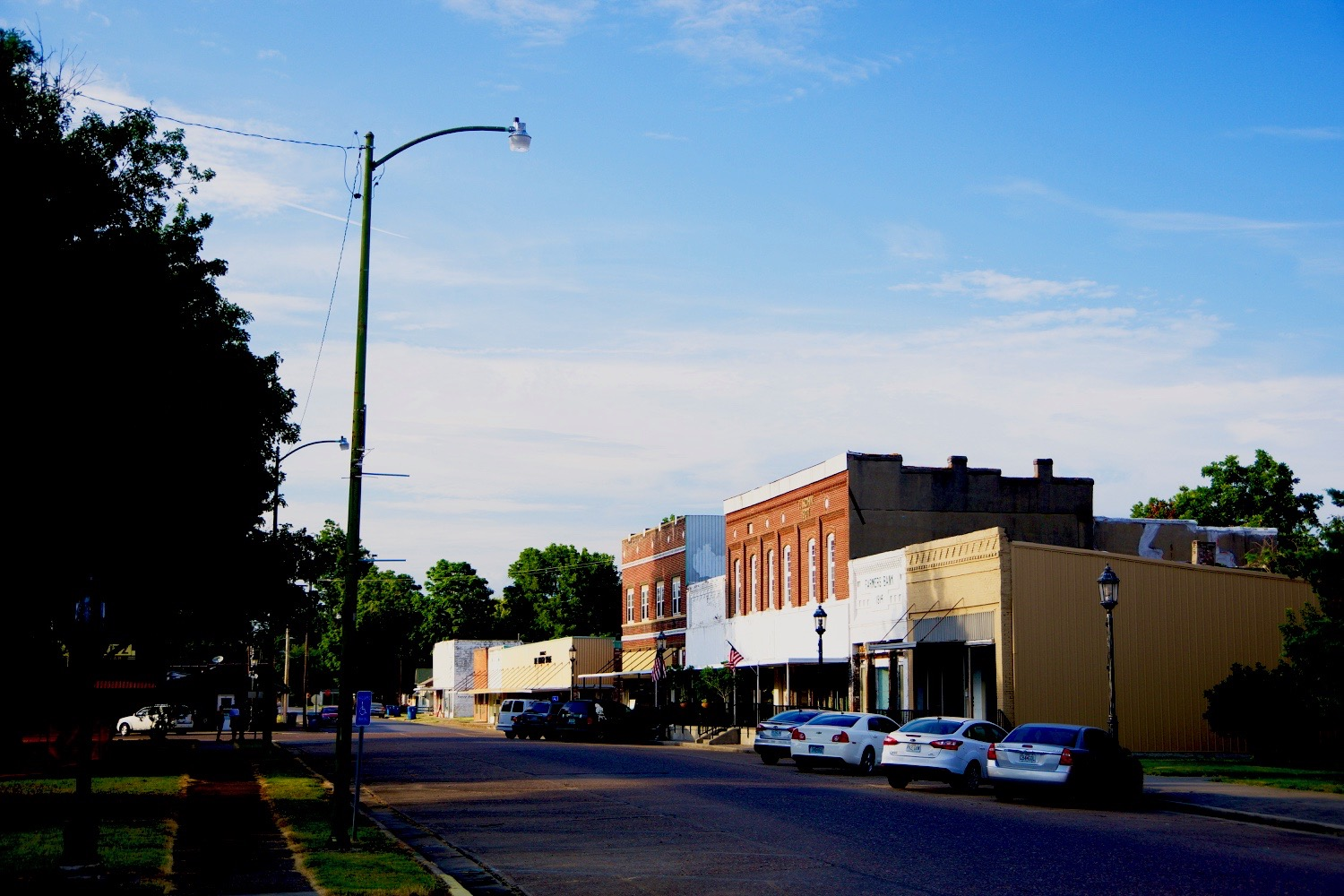
- Block along 4th Street

- Location of Hayti, Missouri
- Coordinates: 36°13′56″N 89°44′51″W
- Country: United States
- State: Missouri
- County: Pemiscot

Area
  - Total: 2.31 sq mi (5.98 km^{2})
  - Land: 2.30 sq mi (5.95 km^{2})
  - Water: 0.012 sq mi (0.03 km^{2})
- Elevation: 269 ft (82 m)

Population (2020)
  - Total: 2,493
  - Density: 1,085.8/sq mi (419.23/km^{2})
- Time zone: UTC-6 (Central (CST))
  - Summer (DST): UTC-5 (CDT)
- ZIP code: 63851
- Area code: 573
- FIPS code: 29-31132
- GNIS feature ID: 2394336

Hayti (/ˈheɪtaɪ/ HAY-ty) is a city in eastern Pemiscot County, Missouri, United States. The population was 2,493 at the 2020 census.

== History ==
Hayti was platted in 1894, when the railroad was extended to that point. According to one tradition, the name honors Dr. G. Hayes, an original owner of the site. It is also claimed the name is derived from the country of Haiti, the name of which was commonly spelled as "Hayti" prior to the twentieth century. A post office called Hayti has been in operation since 1895.

== Geography ==
The city lies in eastern Pemiscot County, just west of the Mississippi River. Interstate 55 passes through the eastern half of Hayti, connecting the city with the Sikeston area to the north and Blytheville, Arkansas, to the south. Interstate 155 intersects I-55 near Hayti's southern border, and continues southeastward across the river into Tennessee. U.S. Route 412 connects Hayti to Kennett to the west, and Route 84 connects the city with Caruthersville to the east. The city of Hayti Heights borders Hayti immediately to the west.

According to the United States Census Bureau, the city has a total area of 2.31 square miles (5.98 km^{2}), of which 2.30 square miles (5.96 km^{2}) is land and 0.01 square miles (0.03 km^{2}) is water.

== Demographics ==
Historical population
Census	Pop.	Note	%±
1900	419		—
1910	1,057		152.3%
1920	1,507		42.6%
1930	1,620		7.5%
1940	2,628		62.2%
1950	3,302		25.6%
1960	3,737		13.2%
1970	3,841		2.8%
1980	3,964		3.2%
1990	3,280		−17.3%
2000	3,207		−2.2%
2010	2,939		−8.4%
2020	2,493		−15.2%
U.S. Decennial Census

=== 2020 census ===
As of the 2020 census, Hayti had a population of 2,493. The median age was 40.5 years. 25.4% of residents were under the age of 18 and 18.3% of residents were 65 years of age or older. For every 100 females there were 86.2 males, and for every 100 females age 18 and over there were 78.4 males age 18 and over.

0.0% of residents lived in urban areas, while 100.0% lived in rural areas.

There were 1,137 households in Hayti, including 650 families. Of all households, 30.1% had children under the age of 18 living in them, 23.7% were married-couple households, 24.3% were households with a male householder and no spouse or partner present, and 43.7% were households with a female householder and no spouse or partner present. About 40.4% of all households were made up of individuals and 16.6% had someone living alone who was 65 years of age or older.

There were 1,260 housing units, of which 9.8% were vacant. The homeowner vacancy rate was 0.4% and the rental vacancy rate was 7.7%.

Racial composition as of the 2020 census
Race	Number	Percent
White	1,114	44.7%
Black or African American	1,237	49.6%
American Indian and Alaska Native	9	0.4%
Asian	1	0.0%
Native Hawaiian and Other Pacific Islander	0	0.0%
Some other race	23	0.9%
Two or more races	109	4.4%
Hispanic or Latino (of any race)	55	2.2%

=== 2010 census ===
As of the census of 2010, there were 2,939 people, 1,258 households, and 739 families living in the city. The population density was 1,277.8 inhabitants per square mile (493.4/km^{2}). There were 1,376 housing units at an average density of 598.3 per square mile (231.0/km^{2}). The racial makeup of the city was 52.23% White, 45.12% Black or African American, 0.31% Native American, 0.31% Asian, 0.51% from other races, and 1.53% from two or more races. Hispanic or Latino of any race were 0.99% of the population.

There were 1,258 households, of which 31.2% had children under the age of 18 living with them, 28.1% were married couples living together, 25.4% had a female householder with no husband present, 5.3% had a male householder with no wife present, and 41.3% were non-families. 36.6% of all households were made up of individuals, and 15.7% had someone living alone who was 65 years of age or older. The average household size was 2.30 and the average family size was 3.01.

The median age in the city was 38.2 years. 26.9% of residents were under the age of 18; 9.9% were between the ages of 18 and 24; 21.6% were from 25 to 44; 25.3% were from 45 to 64; and 16.4% were 65 years of age or older. The gender makeup of the city was 45.8% male and 54.2% female.

=== 2000 census ===
As of the census of 2000, there were 3,207 people, 1,318 households, and 809 families living in the city. The population density was 1,450.1 inhabitants per square mile (559.9/km^{2}). There were 1,436 housing units at an average density of 649.3 per square mile (250.7/km^{2}). The racial makeup of the city was 54.66% White, 43.75% African American, 0.44% Native American, 0.19% Asian, 0.12% from other races, and 0.84% from two or more races. Hispanic or Latino of any race were 1.31% of the population.

There were 1,318 households, out of which 30.1% had children under the age of 18 living with them, 33.8% were married couples living together, 23.9% had a female householder with no husband present, and 38.6% were non-families. 36.1% of all households were made up of individuals, and 19.2% had someone living alone who was 65 years of age or older. The average household size was 2.33 and the average family size was 3.06.

In the city, the population was spread out, with 30.1% under the age of 18, 8.0% from 18 to 24, 23.3% from 25 to 44, 19.4% from 45 to 64, and 19.3% who were 65 years of age or older. The median age was 35 years. For every 100 females, there were 79.9 males. For every 100 females age 18 and over, there were 73.0 males.

The median income for a household in the city was $15,384, and the median income for a family was $23,720. Males had a median income of $24,028 versus $15,486 for females. The per capita income for the city was $13,265. About 35.7% of families and 38.3% of the population were below the poverty line, including 54.7% of those under age 18 and 29.5% of those age 65 or over.

== Education ==
Public education in Hayti is administered by Hayti R-II School District, which operates two elementary schools and Hayti High School.

Hayti has a lending library, the Conran Memorial Library.

Three Rivers College's service area includes Pemiscot County.

== Notable people ==
- Veda Brown (born 1949), singer
- Lew Carpenter (1932–2010), NFL running back and coach
- Preston Carpenter (1934–2011), University of Arkansas and NFL running back
- Akela Cooper, screenwriter and television producer
- Wendell Mayes (1919–1992), Oscar-nominated screenwriter
- William Moore (born 1985), NFL safety
- Keith Palmer (1957–1996), country musician
- Bob Stroger (born 1930), blues musician
