= A79 =

A79 or A-79 may refer to:

- A79 motorway (France)
- A79 road, a major road in the UK
- A79 motorway (Netherlands)
- Benoni Defense, in the Encyclopaedia of Chess Openings
- Calder Highway, in Victoria, Australia, designated A79
- Chignik Lake Airport, an airport in Alaska, designated by the FAA LID "A79"
- .a79, a file extension for programming ARM microcontrollers
