= Finley, Tennessee =

- Unincorporated community
- Location within Tennessee Location within the United States
- Coordinates: 36°02′09″N 89°28′47″W
- Country: United States
- State: Tennessee
- County: Dyer
- Settled: 1840
- Founded: 1881
- Named for: James Allen Finley

Area
  - Total: 1.31 sq mi (3.38 km^{2})
  - Land: 1.31 sq mi (3.38 km^{2})
  - Water: 0 sq mi (0.00 km^{2})
- Elevation: 282 ft (86 m)

Population (2020)
  - Total: 774
  - Density: 593.4/sq mi (229.11/km^{2})
- Time zone: UTC-6 (Central (CST))
  - Summer (DST): UTC-5 (CDT)
- ZIP code: 38030
- Area code: 731
- GNIS feature ID: 1284270

Finley is an unincorporated community in Dyer County, Tennessee, United States. It is located roughly 5.5 miles west of downtown Dyersburg along Tennessee State Route 104. Tennessee State Route 182 also passes through the community, which connects it with Interstate 155 and Lenox to the north.

== History ==
Originally known as Pleasant Hill, the community was settled beginning in 1840 on the high ground just north of the modern-day village. The area surrounding Finley was hunted by Davy Crockett, who named the creek that runs through Finley after himself.

The community is named after local businessman and farmer James Allen Finley, who moved to the area in 1858 and eventually had a post office established in his home.

Today, the village serves as a hub for the smaller communities of western Dyer County that lie within the Mississippi River alluvial plane. It is the home of Finley Elementary School, which traces its roots to the earliest days of the village. There are also four churches in the community- Finley Baptist Church, Finley Methodist Church, Finley United Pentecostal Church, and Junction Church of God. These churches work together on various community initiatives, including the annual Finley Freedom Festival in early July. Finley has a post office, with ZIP code is 38030.

== Demographics ==
Historical population
Census	Pop.	Note	%±
2020	774		—
U.S. Decennial Census

== Education ==
The school district is the Dyer County School District. The zoned high school is Dyer County High School in Newbern.
