= Interstate 155 (Missouri–Tennessee) =

Highway in Missouri and Tennessee, US

Interstate 155
- I-155 highlighted in red

Route information
- Auxiliary route of I-55
- Length: 26.66 mi (42.91 km)
- Existed: August 18, 1964–present
- History: Completed in 1979
- NHS: Entire route

Major junctions
- West end: I-55 / US 61 / US 412 near Hayti, Missouri
- Route 84 / Route Y in Caruthersville, Missouri; SR 181 near Boothspoint, Tennessee; SR 78 in Dyersburg, Tennessee
- East end: US 51 / US 412 in Dyersburg, Tennessee

Location
- Country: United States
- States: Missouri, Tennessee
- Counties: Missouri: Pemiscot; Tennessee: Dyer

Highway system
- Interstate Highway System; Main; Auxiliary; Suffixed; Business; Future
- Missouri State Highway System; Interstate; US; State; Supplemental
- Tennessee State Routes; Interstate; US; State
← Route 154	MO	→ Route 156
← SR 154	TN	→ SR 155

Interstate 155 (I-155) is an east–west auxiliary Interstate Highway that runs 26.66 miles (42.91 km) through the Bootheel of Missouri and the northwestern corner of Tennessee, United States. It begins south of Hayti, Missouri, at Interstate 55 (I-55) and passes eastward through Caruthersville, before crossing the Mississippi River on the Caruthersville Bridge, a cantilevered through truss bridge, into Tennessee. The route then proceeds to Dyersburg, where it terminates at an interchange with U.S. Route 51 (US 51). I-155 is the only piece of surface transportation infrastructure that directly connects Missouri and Tennessee, and is concurrent with US 412 for its entire length.

A proposal for a bridge between Missouri and Tennessee arose in the late 1930s, at which point the two states were two of the last remaining contiguous states not connected by road or rail. After the Interstate Highway System was established in 1956, this proposal began to be incorporated into a larger proposal for a new Interstate Highway linking I-55 in Hayti to I-40 in Jackson, Tennessee. In 1964, the federal government approved the westernmost portion of this freeway, designating it as I-155, but did not approve the entire route to Jackson. Construction on the Caruthersville Bridge began in 1969, and the Missouri portion of the route was started in 1974; both opened in 1976. Work on the Tennessee segment of I-155 began in 1973, and the last section was completed in 1979.

== Route description ==
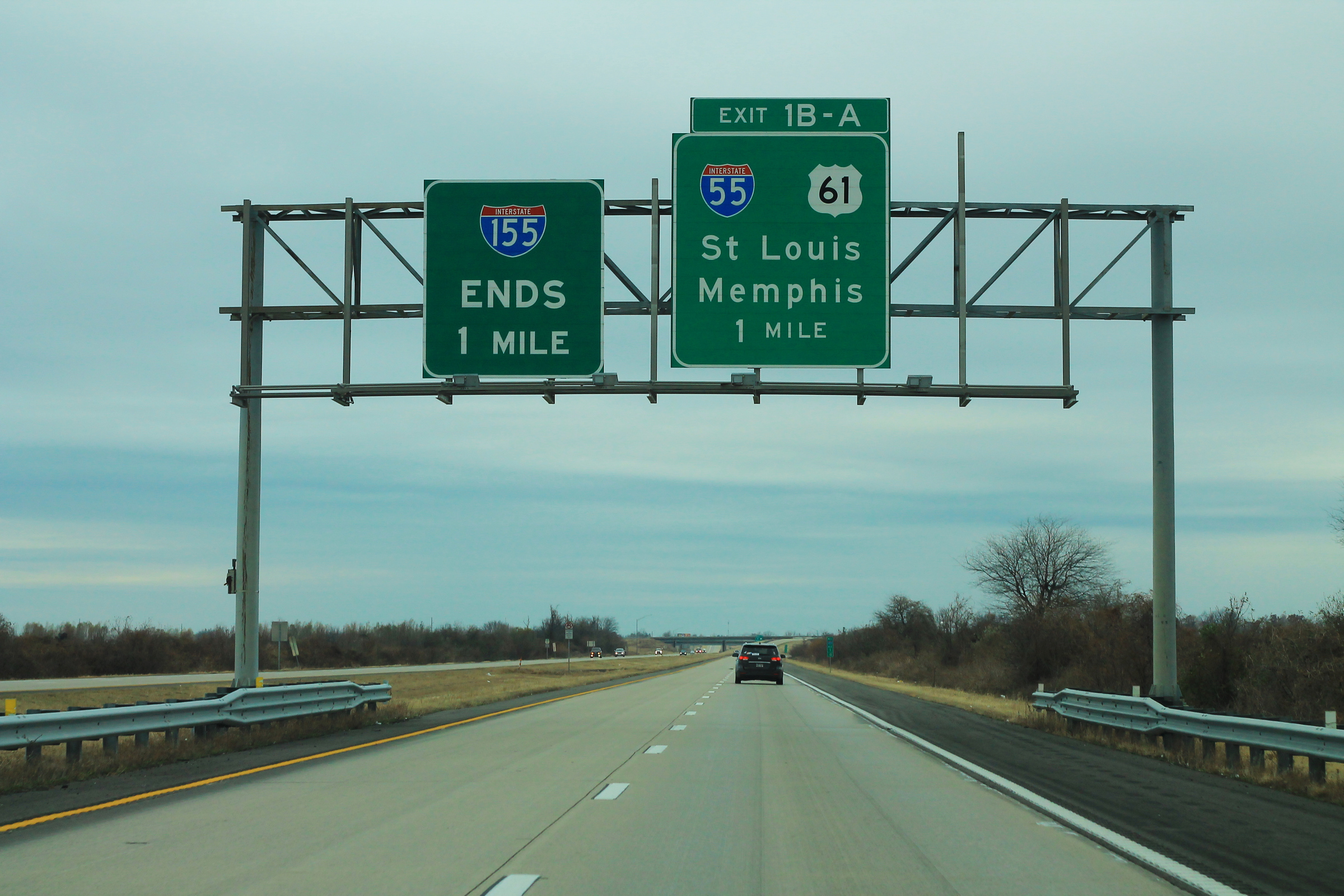
I-155 westbound near its western terminus

I-155 runs for a total of 26.66 miles (42.91 km)–10.72 miles (17.25 km) in Missouri and 15.94 miles (25.65 km) in Tennessee. It is maintained by the Missouri Department of Transportation (MoDOT) and the Tennessee Department of Transportation (TDOT). The entire highway is a part of the National Highway System, a national network of roads identified as important to the national economy, defense, and mobility.

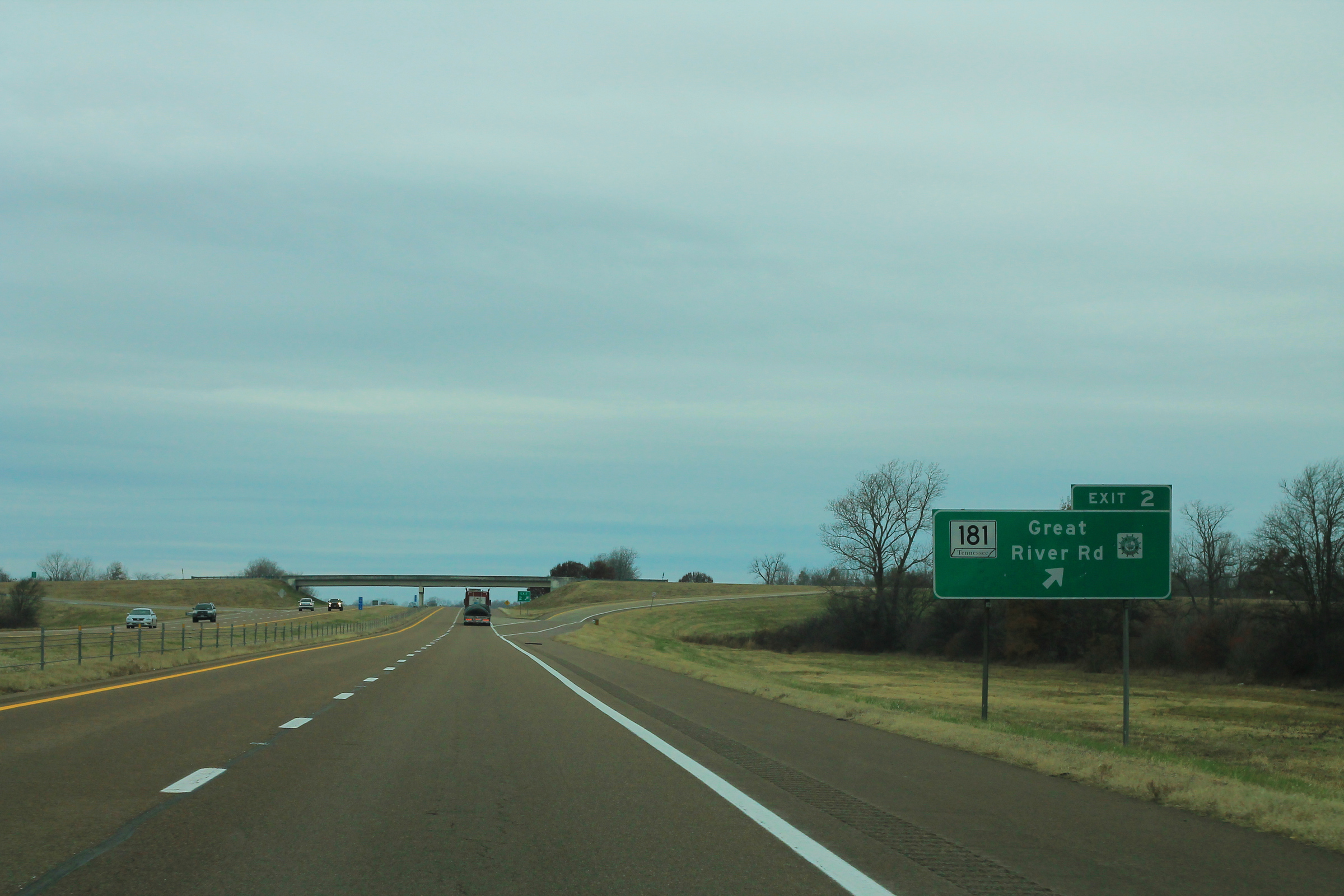
I-155 westbound at the Great River Road exit

I-155 begins at a near-full cloverleaf interchange with I-55 and US 61 in Pemiscot County, Missouri, on the edge of Hayti, where US 412 continues as a four-lane divided highway to the northwest. Initially traveling in a southeastward direction, the Interstate passes through farmland in a sparsely populated rural area. A few miles later, the highway passes south of Caruthersville where it has an interchange first with supplemental Routes D and U, and then with the southern terminus of Route 84 near the Caruthersville Memorial Airport. A few miles later, the highway shifts south-southeast before crossing the Mississippi River on the Caruthersville Bridge into Dyer County, Tennessee. This bridge has a total length of 1.35 miles (2.17 km), and consists of a cantilevered through truss structure above the river's main channel.

Upon crossing the river into Tennessee, I-155 veers east-southeast and reaches an interchange with State Route 181 (SR 181), which is part of the Great River Road. Passing through additional farmland, the Interstate crosses the Obion River a few miles later and has an interchange with SR 182 a short distance beyond south of the Lenox community. The highway then ascends out of the Mississippi Alluvial Plain on to the Gulf Coastal Plain and enters a wooded area, where the Tennessee Welcome Center is located, before reaching Dyersburg a few miles later. Traveling along the northern fringes of the city in an eastward direction, the Interstate has an interchange first with SR 78, which also provides access to Tiptonville. A few miles later, the Interstate turns northeast, before reaching a trumpet interchange with US 51, where the I-155 designation ends, and US 412 splits off to the south towards Jackson. The route continues to the northeast as a controlled-access segment of US 51.

== History ==
=== Background and planning ===
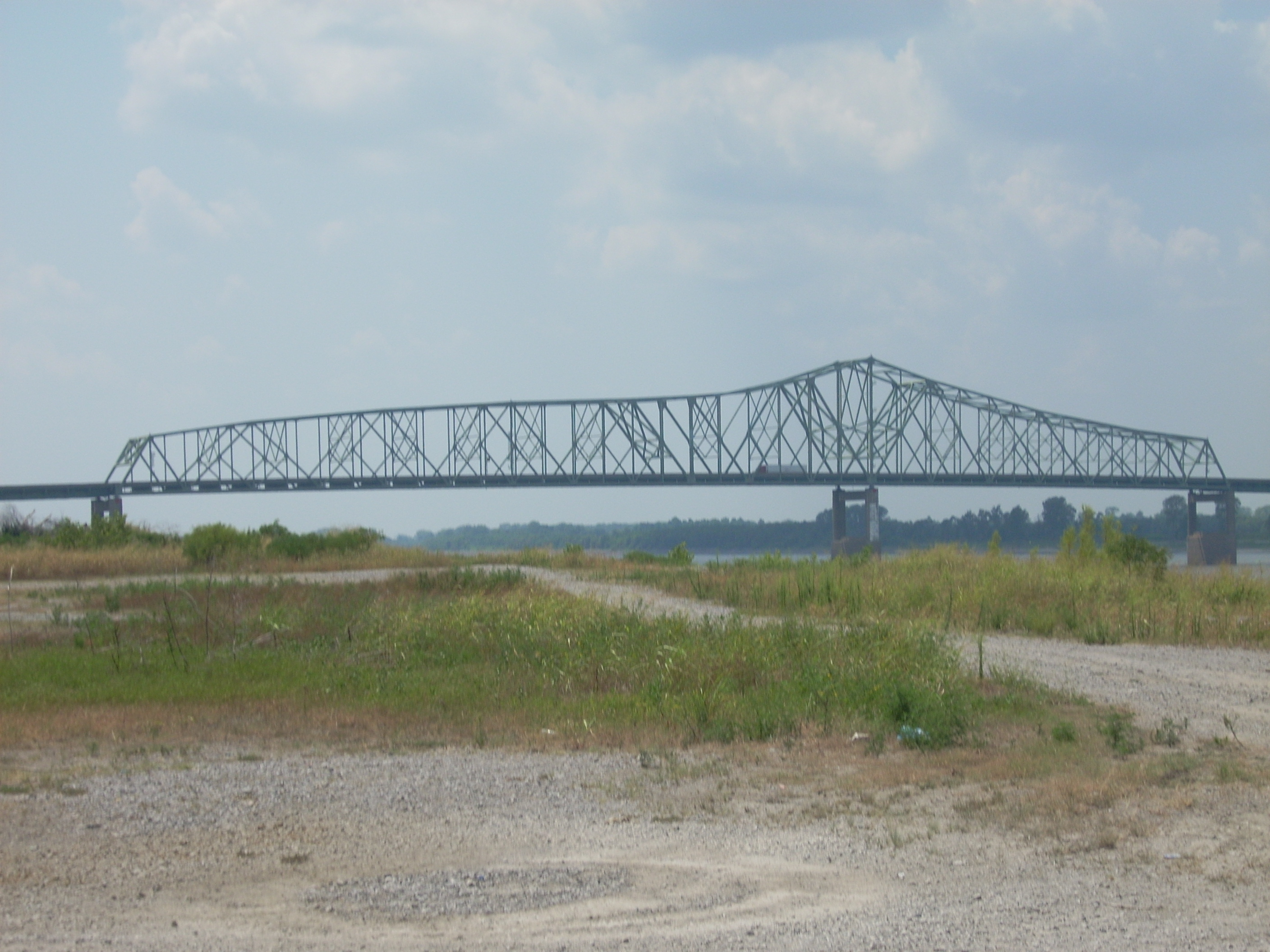
The Caruthersville Bridge from the Tennessee side of the Mississippi River

Prior to the construction of the Caruthersville Bridge, a number of ferries crossed the Mississippi River between the two states. By the late 1930s, Missouri and Tennessee were two of the few remaining bordering states in the country that were not directly connected by road or rail, and a bridge across the river began to be proposed. Caruthersville newspaper The Republican reportedly suggested a bridge be constructed in the area in 1936 or 1937, and by early August 1939, a group of local citizens began promoting the idea. That same year, the Pemiscot County court reportedly endorsed the construction of a bridge across the river near Caruthersville, but little action was taken until 1946, when the Caruthersville Chamber of Commerce and Caruthersville Rotary Club began promoting the project. On September 15 of that year, the Caruthersville and Dyersburg chambers of commerce held a meeting and established the "Hands Across the River Committee" to promote the project. Three months later, the two chambers hired engineering firm Sverdrup & Parcel to conduct a feasibility study on the project. The study was conducted in the spring of 1947, and found that the traffic volumes on the bridge would not justify the cost of such an undertaking. Nevertheless, proponents of the bridge persisted, and in 1949 successfully lobbied both state legislatures to create a commission to study the bridge project, which held its first meeting on September 14 of that year. The commission authorized feasibility and traffic studies for three possible sites on August 14, 1951, which took place the following spring, and considered constructing the bridge as a toll bridge. The commission chose the site on November 18, 1952, which was subsequently approved by the Army Corps of Engineers on August 20, 1953. The studies had estimated that tolls would only finance approximately one half of the cost of the bridge, which prompted the commission to recommend seeking federal funding for the project or finance it by issuing bonds. The inability to secure a funding source would ultimately delay the project.

While the Caruthersville Bridge was being planned, the federal government had been planning for a nationwide network of controlled-access highways, which would become the Interstate Highway System. After this system was authorized by the Federal-Aid Highway Act of 1956, officials in Missouri, Tennessee, Kentucky, and Illinois began an effort to improve connectivity between the four states. This proposal included a new Interstate Highway between I-55 in Hayti and I-40 in Jackson, Tennessee, incorporating the bridge proposal, as well as a westward extension of I-24 from its allocated terminus in Nashville. On January 7, 1960, Tennessee officials submitted a letter to the Bureau of Public Roads (BPR), the predecessor agency to the Federal Highway Administration (FHWA), for the approval of a 63-mile (101 km) Interstate Highway between Hayti and Jackson. This proposal was echoed by the bridge commission in a meeting with BPR administrator Rex Marion Whitton on May 25, 1961, but was reportedly not considered since the federal government had yet to determine how many miles they would be able to add to the Interstate system. On January 30, 1962, Governors John M. Dalton of Missouri and Buford Ellington of Tennessee jointly submitted an application to the BPR for the new Interstate. On September 17, 1963, the governors of the four states met with President John F. Kennedy where they reached an agreement on the alignment for the I-24 extension and endorsed the routing for the Hayti-to-Jackson Interstate Highway, which they unofficially dubbed I-24W. On August 18, 1964, the BPR approved the I-24 extension and authorized an Interstate Highway spur route between Hayti and Dyersburg, which was named I-155. However, they did not give approval to the entire proposed route to Jackson.

=== Construction ===
Construction of I-155 began with the contract for the Caruthersville Bridge piers, which was announced to have been awarded on March 20, 1969. Preliminary work began with construction of an access road to the site in June 1969, and work on the first pier was underway three months later. The contract for the construction of the 1,030-foot (310 m) bridge approach on the Missouri side was awarded in December 1971, and the contract for the 2,480-foot (760 m) Tennessee approach was awarded in December 1972. Both projects experienced delays due to flooding and erosion in 1973. The contract for grading and construction of bridges for the stretch between the Tennessee approach and SR 182 was awarded in January 1973. This project required the construction of an artificial levee within the Mississippi River flood plain, which proved to be one of the most difficult jobs ever undertaken by TDOT. This work was completed by the end of 1975, after multiple delays. In Missouri, the contract for construction of the section between I-55 and Routes D and U was let in May 1974, and the adjacent section extending to the Mississippi River approach was awarded two months later. The design work for the section between SR 182 and US 51 was not approved prior to the enactment of the National Environmental Policy Act of 1969, and required an environmental impact statement (EIS). A draft EIS was approved by the FHWA on September 30, 1974.

On December 1, 1976, the Caruthersville Bridge was dedicated and opened to traffic in a ceremony by Missouri Governor Kit Bond and Tennessee Governor Ray Blanton. The entirety of I-155 in Missouri and the Tennessee section extending to SR 182 were also opened on this day, with the latter section restricted to two lanes to allow for completion of final paving. This paving work was scheduled for completion by October 1, 1977. The first contract for the section between SR 182 and the eastern terminus with US 51/412 was awarded in August 1975, and this section was completed in December 1979, after several delays.

=== Later history ===
While the Interstate Highway between Dyersburg and Jackson was never approved, TDOT continued to explore options to upgrade this stretch of highway, which was then a two lane road only designated as SR 20. The first major proposal was for a toll road throughout the 1970s; however, this idea was resisted by many state officials and citizens alike. On June 22, 1980, the American Association of State Highway and Transportation Officials established US 412 along I-155 as part of a route between Jackson and Walnut Ridge, Arkansas. On June 14, 1985, the FHWA approved a draft EIS for the upgrade to US 412, which included the possibility of constructing the route as a fully controlled-access highway or a four-lane divided highway without access control. The upgrade was one of six freeway projects including in Governor Lamar Alexander's Better Roads Program in 1986, referred to as "Bicentennial Parkways", and was referred to in the initial plans as the "Interstate 155 Extension". Unlike all of the other freeway projects, however, the US 412 upgrade was instead constructed as a limited-access four-lane highway with a combination of interchanges and at-grade intersections. This work took place between 1989 and 1995.

An extension of I-69 through Tennessee was proposed under the 1991 Intermodal Surface Transportation Efficiency Act (ISTEA) as part of a corridor to facilitate trade between Canada and Mexico. This extension was further spearheaded by the enactment of the North American Free Trade Agreement (NAFTA) in 1994. This extension, sometimes considered part of the unofficial NAFTA superhighway, was proposed to interchange with I-155 northwest of Dyersburg, replace the remainder of the route to its eastern terminus, and continue onto the US 51 freeway. This proposal would reduce the length of I-155 by approximately eight miles (13 km); however, it is unclear whether or not this extension of I-69 will ever be built.

On June 29, 2007, MoDOT held a ribbon cutting ceremony for the completion of the widening of US 412 directly west of the western terminus of I-155 at I-55 from two to four lanes, which also included minor modifications to this interchange. This was the last phase of a larger project that widened the route between Hayti and Kennett, and final work was completed approximately one week later. Between May 11 and August 2, 2021, I-155 served as one of three major detour routes for the Hernando de Soto Bridge on I-40 in Memphis, which was closed to all traffic due to a fracture in the bridge's substructure.

=== Incidents and closures ===
On January 11, 1978, a group of approximately 65 Arkansas and Missouri farmers participating in the American Agriculture Movement's Tractorcade protests attempted to drive their tractors onto I-155 from the Missouri side and cross the Caruthersville Bridge into Dyersburg. The farmers, who had been given permission to use the Interstate by Missouri Governor Joseph P. Teasdale, were stopped by Missouri highway patrolmen, resulting in seven arrests and two injuries.

Since its construction, the Caruthersville Bridge piers have been struck by barges on multiple occasions, resulting in temporary closures to assess damages. The most serious incident occurred on April 17, 1979, when ten barge vessels crashed into the bridge, spilling 63,000 US gallons (240 cubic metres) of styrene and 84,000 US gallons (320 cubic metres) of No. 6 fuel oil into the Mississippi River. The crash was caused when the barges' tugboat experienced navigation problems, causing the vessels to be caught in the current and turned sideways, and the Environmental Protection Agency assisted in the cleanup. On July 23, 1995, a 195-foot (59 m) barge that had broken free from its towboat struck one of the bridge's piers and sank.

== Exit list ==
State	County	Location	mi	km	Exit	Destinations	Notes
Missouri	Pemiscot		0.000	0.000		US 412 west	Westbound exit and eastbound entrance; western terminus; western end of US 412 concurrency; I-55 exit 17B; cloverleaf interchange.
Missouri	Pemiscot		0.149– 0.206	0.240– 0.332	1	I-55 / US 61 – Memphis, St. Louis	Signed as exits 1A (south) and 1B (north); I-55 exit 17A; cloverleaf interchange.
Missouri	Pemiscot		4.346	6.994	4	Route D / Route U – Caruthersville	
Missouri	Pemiscot	Caruthersville	6.769	10.894	6	Route 84 / Route Y – Caruthersville	
Mississippi River			10.723 0.00	17.257 0.00	Caruthersville Bridge		
Tennessee	Dyer		2.30	3.70	2	SR 181 (Great River Road)	
Tennessee	Dyer		7.42	11.94	7	SR 182 (Lenox Road)	
Tennessee	Dyer	Dyersburg				I-69 south – Memphis	Proposed I-69 south; future eastern terminus of I-155
Tennessee	Dyer	Dyersburg	13.02	20.95	13	SR 78 – Dyersburg, Tiptonville, Union City	
Tennessee	Dyer	Dyersburg	15.92	25.62	15	US 51 / US 412 east – Dyersburg, Jackson, Union City	Eastern terminus; eastern end of US 412 concurrency
1.000 mi = 1.609 km; 1.000 km = 0.621 mi: Incomplete access; Unopened
