= New York State Route 181 =

New York State Route 181 may refer to:

- New York State Route 181 (1930–1939) in Jefferson County, from Clayton to Theresa
- New York State Route 181 (1960–1963) also in Jefferson County, from Pamelia to Le Ray
