= Boothspoint, Tennessee =

Unincorporated community in Tennessee, US

Coordinates: 36°06′45″N 89°36′10″W

Boothspoint is an unincorporated community in Dyer County, Tennessee, in the United States.

== History ==
A post office called Booth's Point was established in 1858, and remained in operation until it was discontinued in 1964. The community was likely named in honor of a local family.
