= Kennett Memorial Airport =

Airport in Kennett, Missouri, U.S.

- IATA: KNT; ICAO: KTKX; FAA LID: TKX

Summary
- Airport type: Public
- Owner: City of Kennett
- Serves: Kennett, Missouri
- Elevation AMSL: 262 ft (80 m)
- Coordinates: 36°13′33″N 090°02′12″W
- Website: KTKX.us

Map
- Location of airport in Missouri TKX (the United States)

Runways
Direction	Length		Surface
Direction	ft	m	Surface
2/20	5,000	1,524	Concrete
18/36	3,012	918	Asphalt

Statistics (2011)
- Aircraft operations: 14,550
- Based aircraft: 14
- Source: Federal Aviation Administration

Kennett Memorial Airport (IATA: KNT, ICAO: KTKX, FAA LID: TKX) is a city-owned, public-use airport located one nautical mile (1.85 km) southeast of the central business district of Kennett, a city in Dunklin County, Missouri, United States. This airport is included in the National Plan of Integrated Airport Systems, which categorized it as a general aviation facility.

Although most U.S. airports use the same three-letter location identifier for the FAA and IATA, this airport is assigned TKX by the FAA and KNT by the IATA (which assigned TKX to Takaroa Airport in Takaroa, French Polynesia).

== Facilities and aircraft ==
Kennett Memorial Airport covers an area of 337 acres (136 ha) at an elevation of 262 feet (80 m) above mean sea level. It has two runways: 2/20 is 5,000 by 75 feet (1,524 x 23 m) with a concrete surface and 18/36 is 3,012 by 75 feet (918 x 23 m) with an asphalt surface.

For the 12-month period ending June 30, 2011, the airport had 14,550 aircraft operations, an average of 39 per day: 97% general aviation, 3% air taxi, and <1% military. At that time there were 14 aircraft based at this airport: 86% single-engine and 14% multi-engine.

== See also ==
- List of airports in Missouri
