= Bogota, Tennessee =

Community in Tennessee, US

Coordinates: 36°09′50″N 89°26′18″W

Bogota is a small farming community in Dyer County, Tennessee. It is located ten miles northwest of Dyersburg. Bogota was formerly home to Bogota Elementary School. Its zip code is 38007.

Population is 89 according to the 2020 census. The Post Office within walking distance of most of the 89 inhabitants, ZIP 38007.

The community is near the Obion River, several miles inland from the Mississippi River. The 2,293-acre (928 ha) Bogota Wildlife Management Area is one of several waterfowl hunting areas that the Tennessee Wildlife Resources Agency maintains in the Obion River floodplain. Flood waters reached Bogota in May 2011 when the Mississippi River flooded.

Bogota was mentioned in the NBC show Third Watch in season 6, episode 15, "Revelations," which originally aired on February 11, 2005. A Vietnam War–era American soldier said on his death bed that he had only wanted to grow wheat on the family farm in Bogota.

== Education ==
The school district is the Dyer County School District. The zoned high school is Dyer County High School in Newbern.
