= Ridgely, Tennessee =

- Town
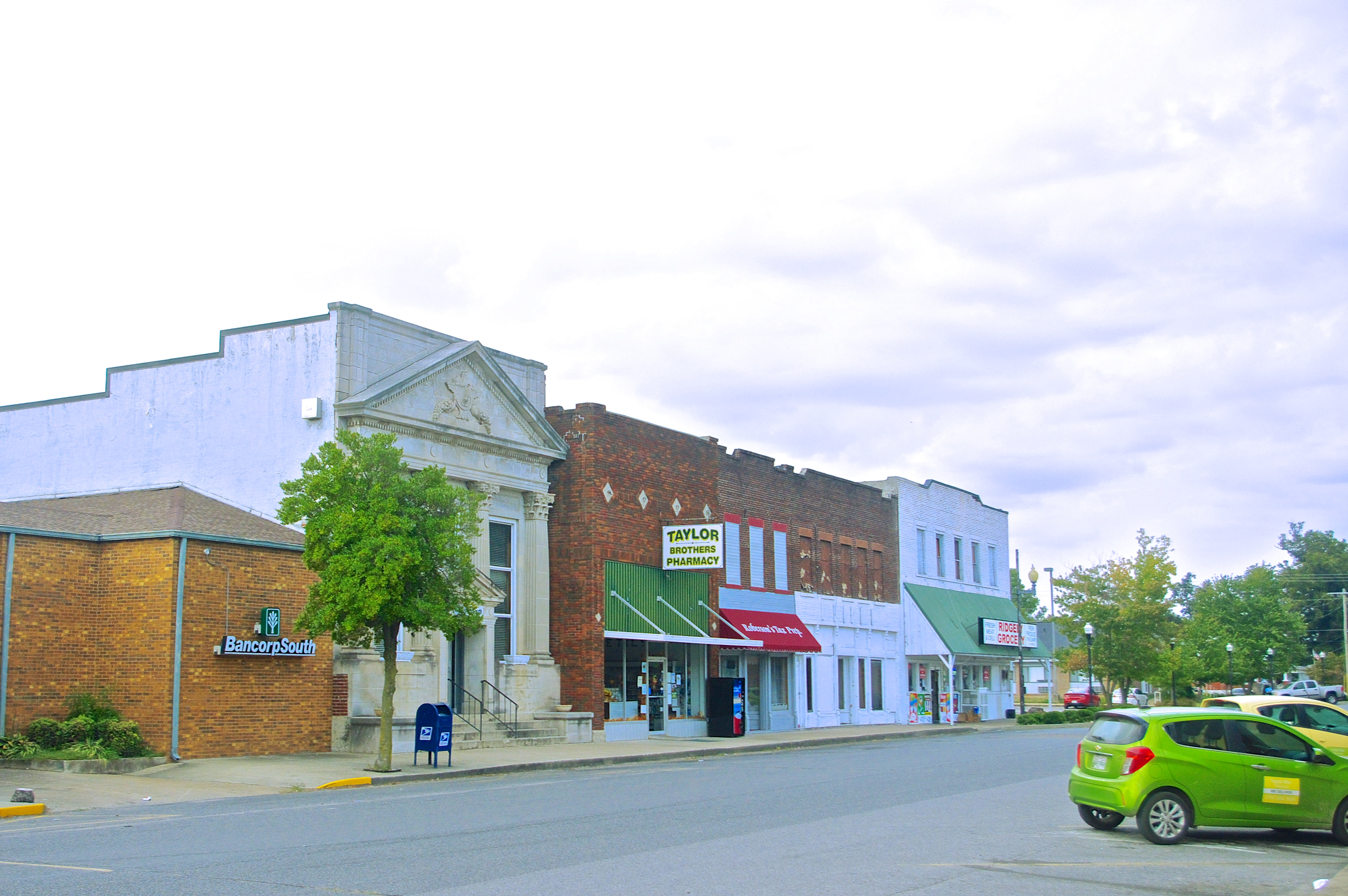
- Main Street

- Location of Ridgely in Lake County, Tennessee.
- Coordinates: 36°15′52″N 89°28′58″W
- Country: United States
- State: Tennessee
- County: Lake

Area
  - Total: 1.98 sq mi (5.14 km^{2})
  - Land: 1.98 sq mi (5.14 km^{2})
  - Water: 0 sq mi (0.00 km^{2})
- Elevation: 282 ft (86 m)

Population (2020)
  - Total: 1,690
  - Density: 852.0/sq mi (328.94/km^{2})
- Time zone: UTC-6 (Central (CST))
  - Summer (DST): UTC-5 (CDT)
- ZIP code: 38080
- Area code: 731
- FIPS code: 47-63060
- GNIS feature ID: 1299402

Ridgely is a town in Lake County, Tennessee, United States. As of the 2020 census, Ridgely had a population of 1,690.

== Geography ==
Ridgely is located at 36°15′52″N 89°28′58″W (36.264559, -89.482668). The town is situated southwest of Reelfoot Lake and east of the Mississippi River. State Route 78 traverses Ridgely, connecting the town with Tiptonville to the north and Dyersburg to the south.

According to the United States Census Bureau, the town has a total area of 0.7 square miles (1.8 km^{2}), all land.

== Demographics ==
Historical population
Census	Pop.	Note	%±
1910	519		—
1920	910		75.3%
1930	979		7.6%
1940	1,068		9.1%
1950	1,504		40.8%
1960	1,464		−2.7%
1970	1,657		13.2%
1980	1,932		16.6%
1990	1,775		−8.1%
2000	1,667		−6.1%
2010	1,795		7.7%
2020	1,690		−5.8%

As of the census of 2000, there were 1,667 people, 673 households, and 461 families residing in the town. The population density was 2,345.1 inhabitants per square mile (905.4/km^{2}). There were 751 housing units at an average density of 1,056.5 per square mile (407.9/km^{2}). The racial makeup of the town was 79.90% White, 17.94% African American, 0.06% Native American, 0.96% from other races, and 1.14% from two or more races. Hispanic or Latino of any race were 1.62% of the population.

There were 673 households, out of which 28.4% had children under the age of 18 living with them, 45.3% were married couples living together, 19.6% had a female householder with no husband present, and 31.5% were non-families. 28.7% of all households were made up of individuals, and 15.6% had someone living alone who was 65 years of age or older. The average household size was 2.34 and the average family size was 2.88.

In the town, the population was spread out, with 23.8% under the age of 18, 6.7% from 18 to 24, 24.2% from 25 to 44, 23.9% from 45 to 64, and 21.3% who were 65 years of age or older. The median age was 41 years. For every 100 females, there were 78.3 males. For every 100 females age 18 and over, there were 69.8 males.

The median income for a household in the town was $20,675, and the median income for a family was $26,607. Males had a median income of $23,625 versus $20,169 for females. The per capita income for the town was $12,176. About 24.5% of families and 26.9% of the population were below the poverty line, including 38.2% of those under age 18 and 27.4% of those age 65 or over.

== Media ==
=== Newspaper ===
- Lake County Banner

=== Radio stations ===
- WTPR-AM 710 - "The Greatest Hits of All Time"
- WENK-AM 1240 - "The Greatest Hits of All Time"

== See also ==
- List of municipalities in Tennessee
