= George Mahan Jr. =

American architect (1887–1967)

George Mahan Jr. (April 6, 1887 – February 19, 1967) was an American architect based in Memphis, Tennessee. He designed courthouses, many residences, and schools. Many of his designs were Neoclassical architecture style, and several buildings he designed are listed on the National Register of Historic Places (NRHP).

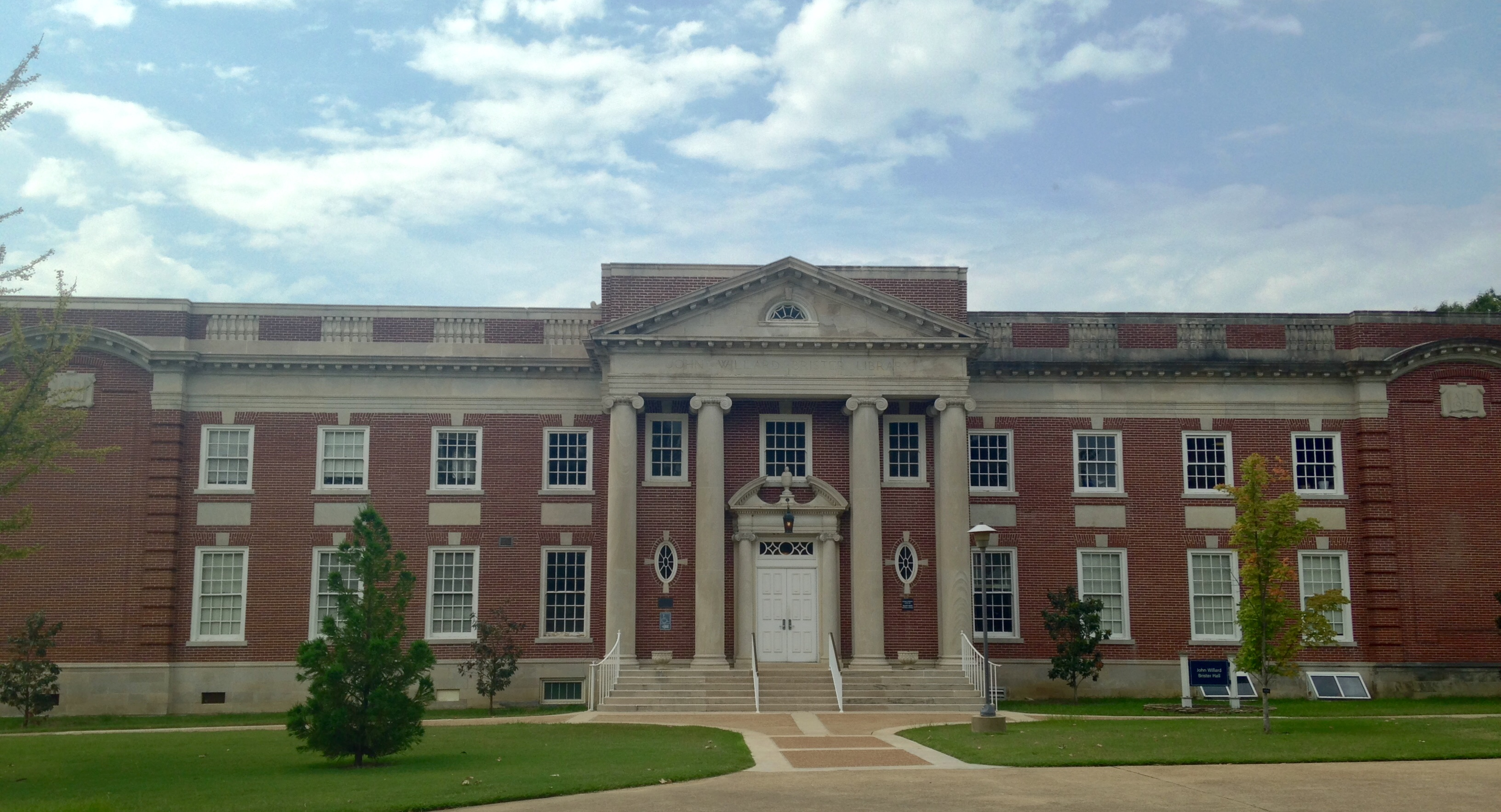
John Willard Brister Library at Memphis State University

He apprenticed under fellow Memphis architect and author Neander Woods and went on to work with his brother Everett Woods on several projects. Mahan founded the firm of Mahan and Broadwell in 1912. His work is noted along with a few other architects on a historical marker in the Central Gardens Historic District. His name and one of the homes he designed are featured in a 1928 Electrol oil burner advertisement in American Architect and Architecture.

Fifteen of his design plans for schools were published in Building Plans for Rural School Houses and were among those mandated for rural schools for African Americans in Tennessee.

Mahan was a member of the American Institute of Architects.

== Work ==
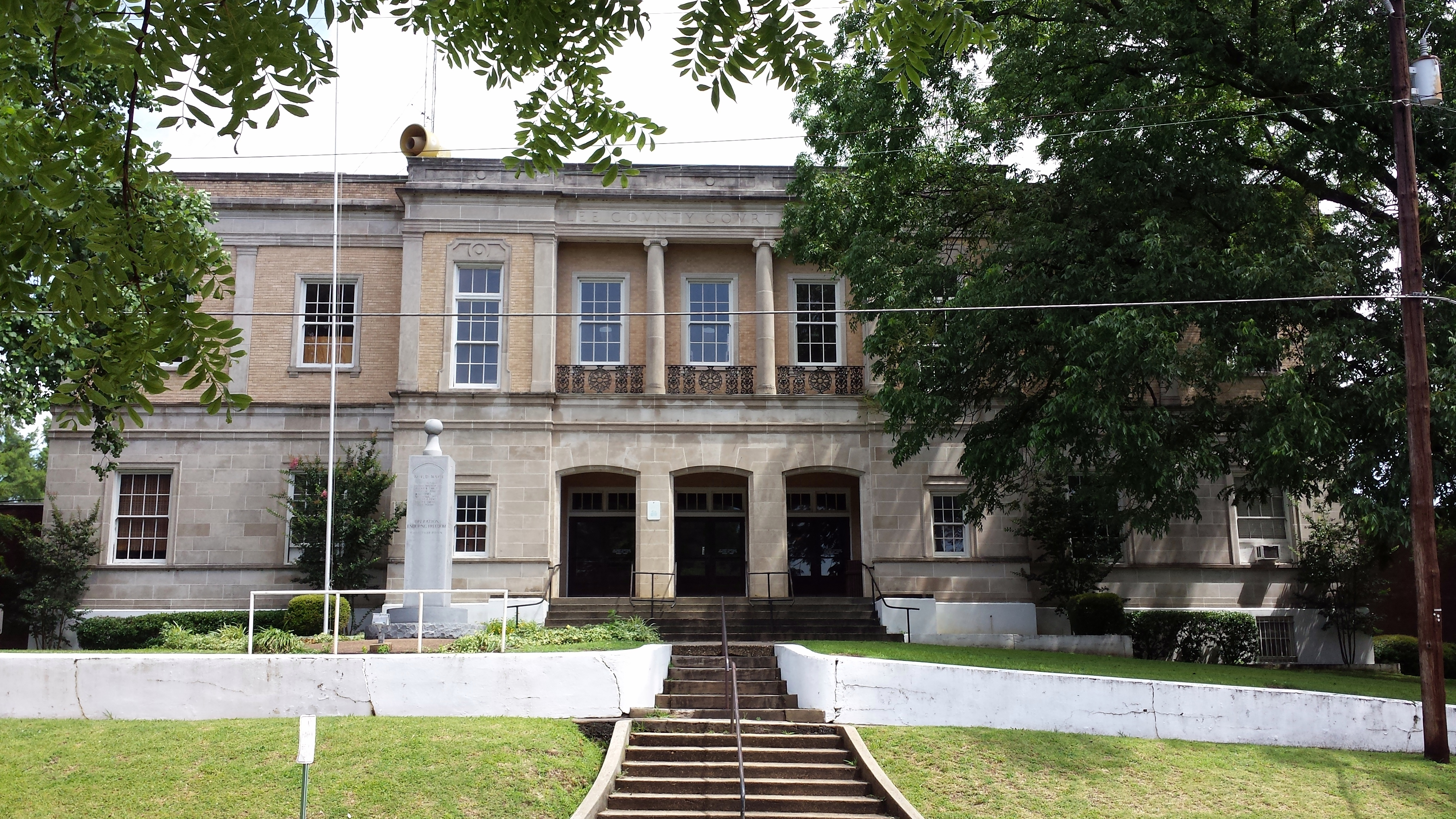
Lee County Courthouse in Marianna, Arkansas

- Lee County Courthouse in Marianna, Arkansas with Everett Wood at 15 E. Chestnut St. NRHP listed
- Fayette County Courthouse (1925), a Classical revival style building in the Somerville Historic District in Somerville, Tennessee.
- Tudor home for Robert E. Lee Wilson in the Wilson Residential Historic District in Wilson, Arkansas (Mississippi County, Arkansas)
- Johnson-Portis House at 400 Avalon Street in West Memphis, Arkansas (completed in 1938) NRHP listed

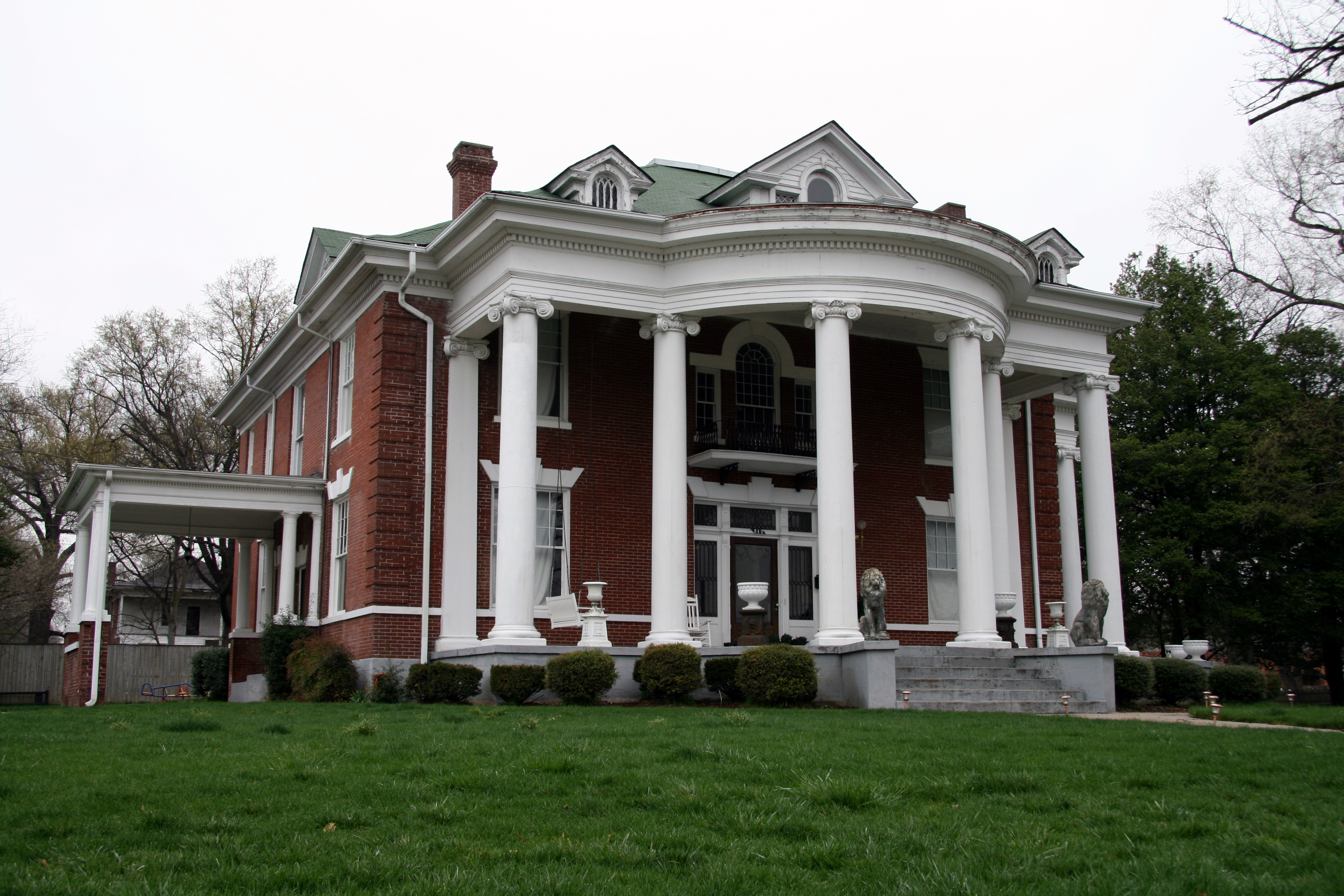
Edward Moody King House in 2008

- John Willard Brister Library at the Memphis State University campus in Memphis, NRHP listed Mahan, George W., Jr.
- 1046 S. Third St. in Gaston Park Historic District, Memphis, TN Mahan, George, Jr.
- Greyhound Lines Station, 325 Main St Greenwood, MS, NRHP listed Mahan, George
- Edward Moody King House (1904), 512 Finley St. In Dyersburg, TN NRHP listed Mahan, George, Jr.
- William A. Webster residence in Memphis. Featured in a 1928 Electrol oil burner advertisement.
- E. H. Crump House at 1962 Peabody Avenue, Memphis, Tennessee (1909)
