= Lee County Courthouse (Arkansas) =

- U.S. National Register of Historic Places
- U.S. Historic district – Contributing property
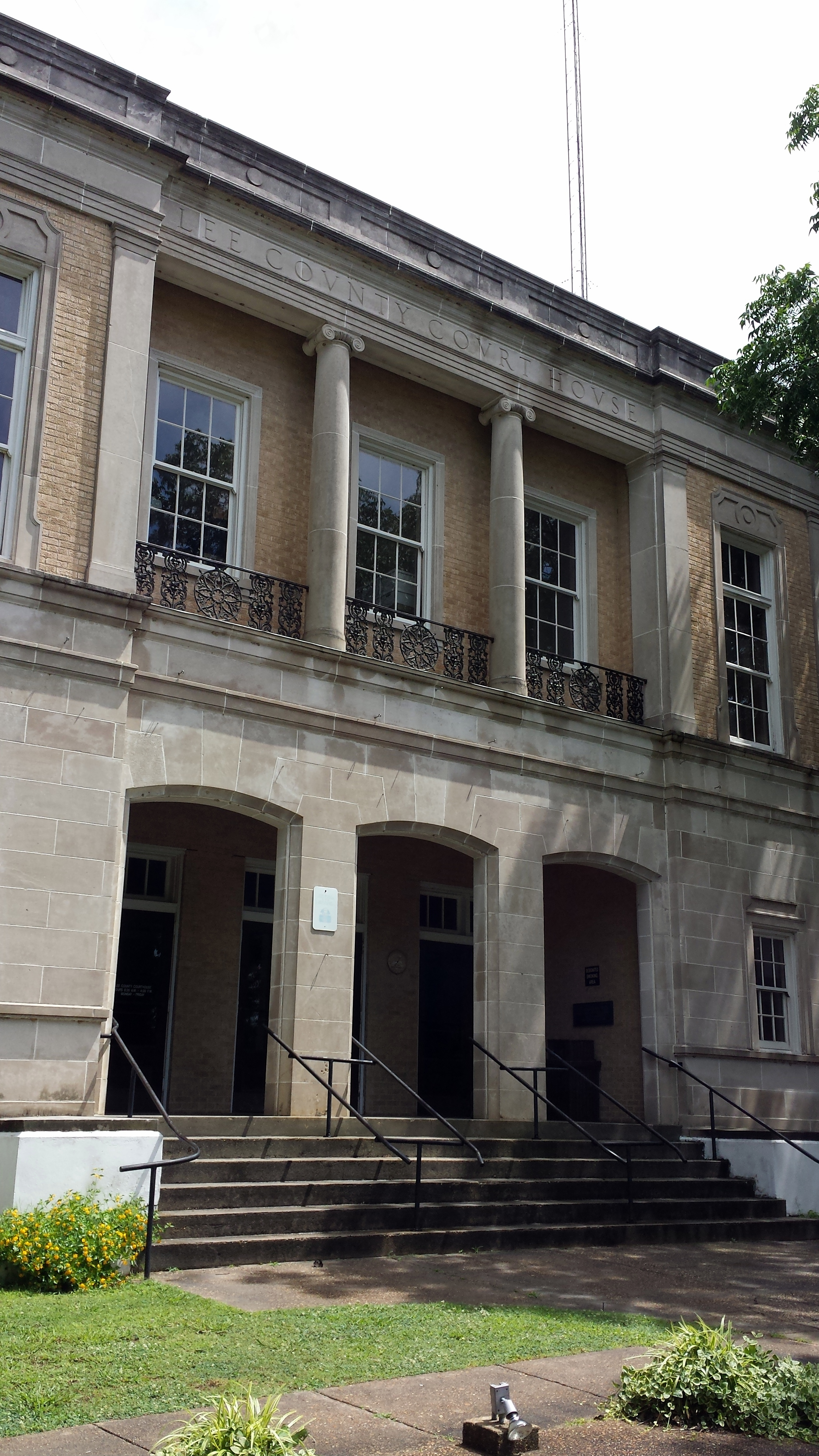

- Location within Arkansas Location within the United States
- Location: 15 E. Chestnut St., Marianna, Arkansas
- Coordinates: 34°46′28″N 90°45′25″W
- Area: 3 acres (1.2 ha)
- Built: 1936
- Built by: Jennings and Samuel
- Architect: George Mahan and Everett Woods
- Architectural style: Colonial Revival, art deco
- Part of: Marianna Commercial Historic District (ID00001559)
- NRHP reference No.: 95001090

Significant dates
- Added to NRHP: September 7, 1995
- Designated CP: January 4, 2001

The Lee County Courthouse features two courthouse buildings constructed at 15 East Chestnut Street in Marianna, Arkansas, United States, the county seat of Lee County. The original courthouse was a wooden at the corner of Poplar and Mississippi streets built in 1873 when Marianna became the county seat of Lee County. A larger courthouse was built in 1890 and it was expanded with another new courthouse building added next to it in 1936. The courthouse compound was listed on the National Register of Historic Places in 1995. The newer courthouse was designed by Memphis, Tennessee based architect George Mahan Jr. with Everett Woods and built in the Colonial Revival and Art Deco styles.

== History ==
Marianna moved south 3 miles (4.8 km) onto the banks of the L'Anguille River in 1869 and is centrally located within Lee County. A red brick courthouse was built in 1890 while the city thrived on the cotton industry. This building became too small and was expanded with the help of Federal Emergency Administration of Public Works funds. Rather than expanding, the county chose to construct a new two-story addition of new materials in a new style in the 1930s, which dwarfed the former structure.

== Architecture ==
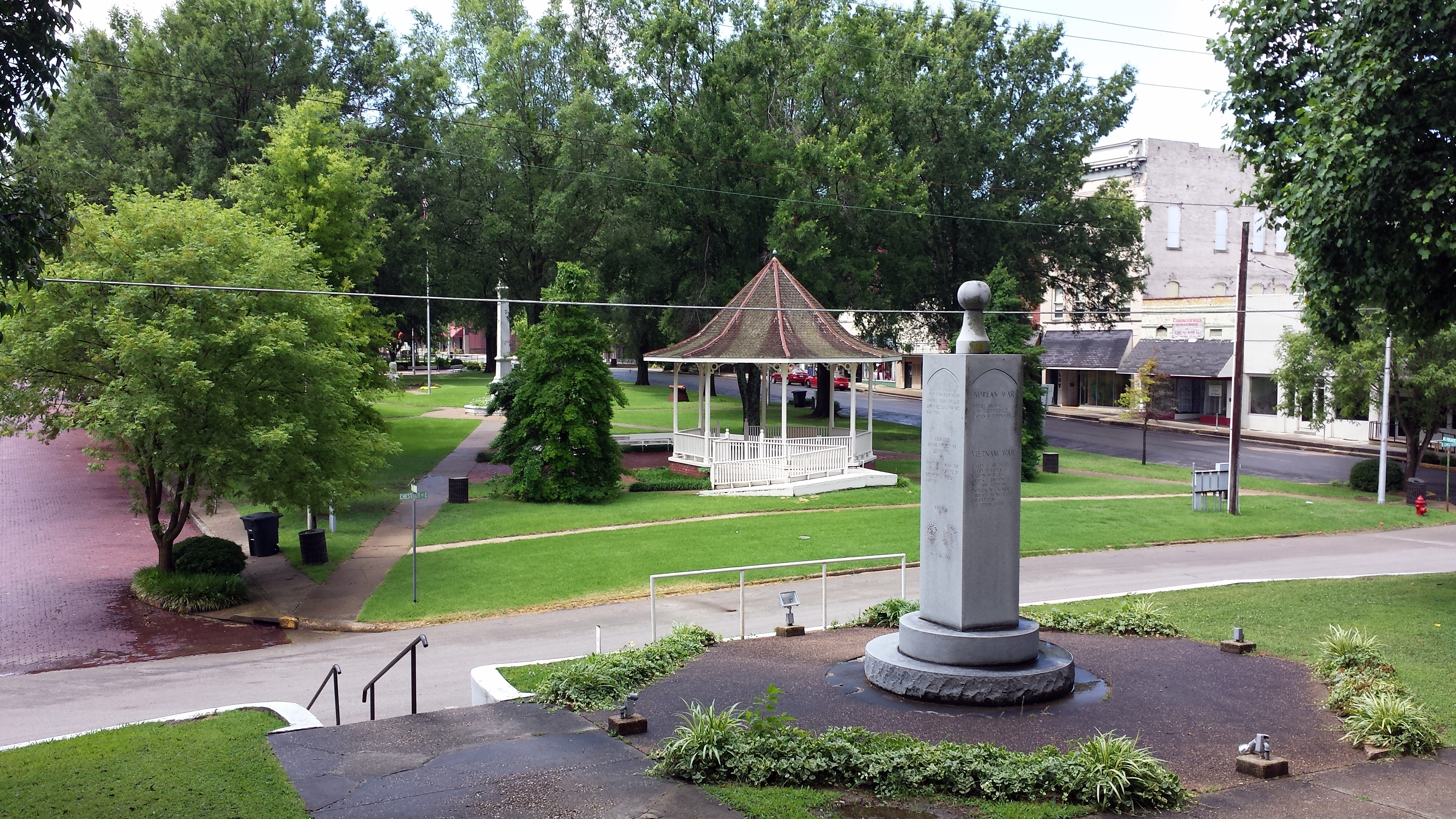
View from front steps

The Lee County Courthouse is a late example of the Classical Revival style, a style which had largely died out by 1920. The columns, entablature, and pilasters typical of a classical revival building are present, if not subdued by the art deco influence.

== See also ==
- National Register of Historic Places listings in Lee County, Arkansas
- List of county courthouses in Arkansas
