= Johnson-Portis House =

Historic house in Arkansas, United States

- U.S. National Register of Historic Places
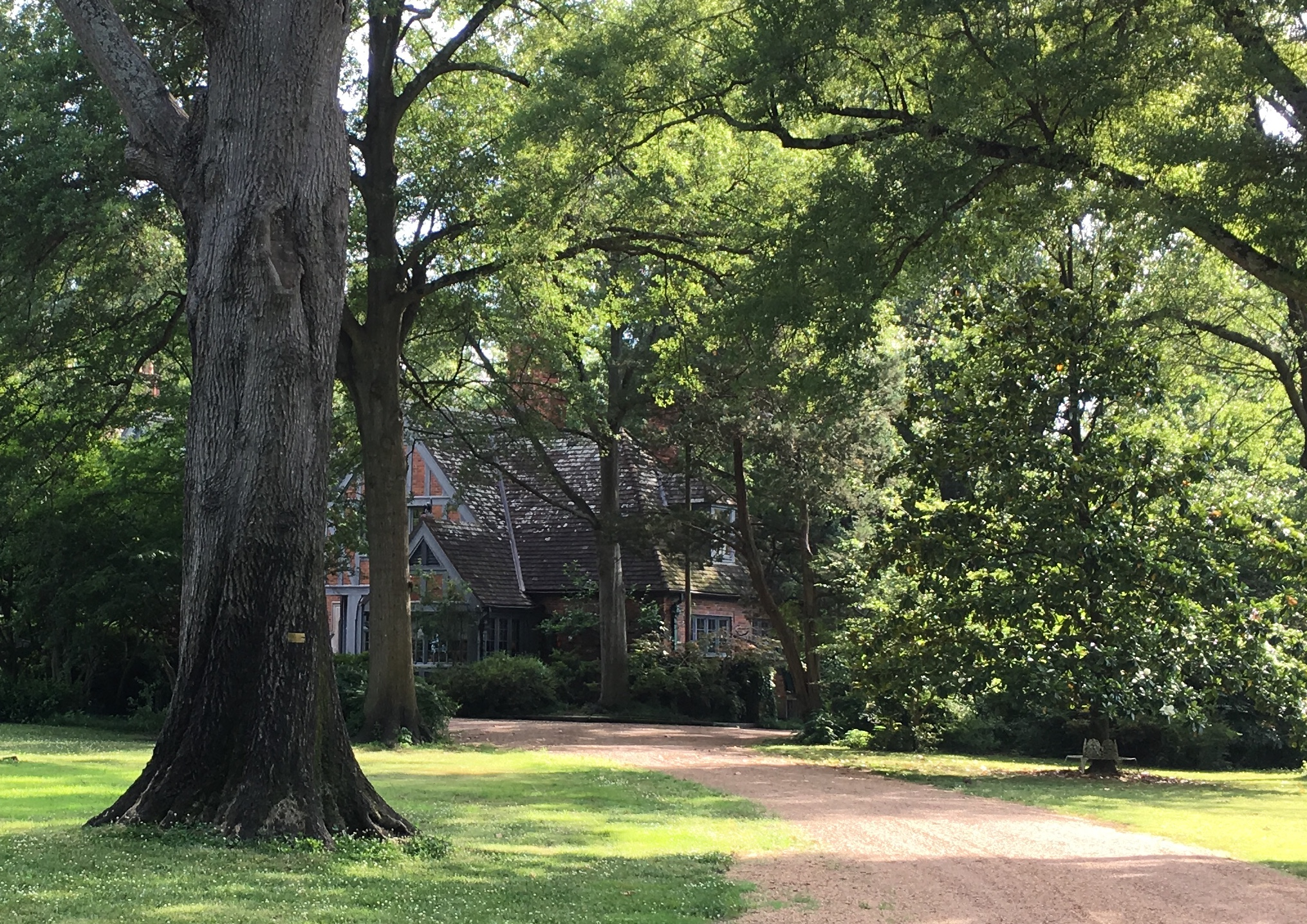

- Location within Arkansas Location within the United States
- Location: 400 N. Avalon St., West Memphis, Arkansas
- Coordinates: 35°9′2″N 90°11′37″W
- Area: 4.75 acres (1.92 ha)
- Built: 1936
- Architect: George Mahan Jr., Everett Wood
- Architectural style: Tudor Revival
- NRHP reference No.: 100001648
- Added to NRHP: September 21, 2017

The Johnson-Portis House is a historic house at 400 Avalon Street in West Memphis, Arkansas. Built 1936–38, it is a prominent local example of Tudor Revival architecture, designed by architects George Mahan Jr. and Everett Woods. It has a steeply pitched roof with half-timbered gables, and small-paned windows, all hallmarks of the style, and is set on an estate property landscaped by Highberger and Park. The property was developed for J.C. Johnson, a local judge.

The house was listed on the National Register of Historic Places in 2017.

== See also ==
- National Register of Historic Places listings in Crittenden County, Arkansas

http://www.woodridgecare.com/center-oak-ridge.html
