= Dyersburg Regional Airport =

- IATA: none; ICAO: KDYR; FAA LID: DYR

Summary
- Airport type: Public
- Owner: City of Dyersburg
- Serves: Dyersburg, Tennessee
- Elevation AMSL: 338 ft (103 m)
- Coordinates: 35°59′53″N 089°24′24″W
- Interactive map of Dyersburg Regional Airport

Runways
Direction	Length		Surface
Direction	ft	m	Surface
4/22	5,698	1,737	Asphalt
16/34	4,001	1,220	Asphalt

Statistics
- Aircraft operations (2019): 7,800
- Based aircraft: 20
- Sources: Tennessee DOT, FAA

Dyersburg Regional Airport (ICAO: KDYR, FAA LID: DYR) is two miles south of Dyersburg, in Dyer County, Tennessee, United States. It was formerly Dyersburg Municipal Airport.

Most U.S. airports use the same three-letter location identifier for the FAA and IATA, but this airport is DYR to the FAA and has no IATA code. (IATA assigned DYR to Anadyr Airport in Anadyr, Russia.)

In 1957-59 it was served by Southeast Airlines DC-3s, and in 1961-63 by Southern Airlines DC-3s. (In 1962, 134 passengers boarded Southern's DC-3s.)

== Facilities ==
The airport covers 275 acres (111 ha) at an elevation of 338 feet (103 m). It has two asphalt runways: 4/22 is 5,698 by 98 feet (1,737 x 30 m) and 16/34 is 4,001 by 74 feet. The FAA has classified runway 4/22 to be in good condition, while the shorter 16/34 runway is listed in poor condition with major cracks in the asphalt. Due to the condition of the runway, 16/34 has been indefinitely closed since October 2019.

In the year ending May 8, 2019, the airport had 7,800 aircraft operations, average 21 per day: 97% general aviation, 1% air taxi and 2% military. 20 aircraft were then based at this airport: 16 single-engine, 3 multi-engine, and 1 jet.

== Incidents ==
- 1963 Camden PA-24 crash
  - Singers Patsy Cline, Cowboy Copas and Hawkshaw Hawkins were killed about a half-hour after their private Piper Comanche flew out of the airport on March 5, 1963 when it crashed near Camden, Tennessee while en route to Nashville. Their plane had left Fairfax Airport in Kansas City, Kansas where they had performed a concert and had stopped in Dyersburg to refuel.

== See also ==
- List of airports in Tennessee
