= Bank of Dyersburg =

- U.S. National Register of Historic Places
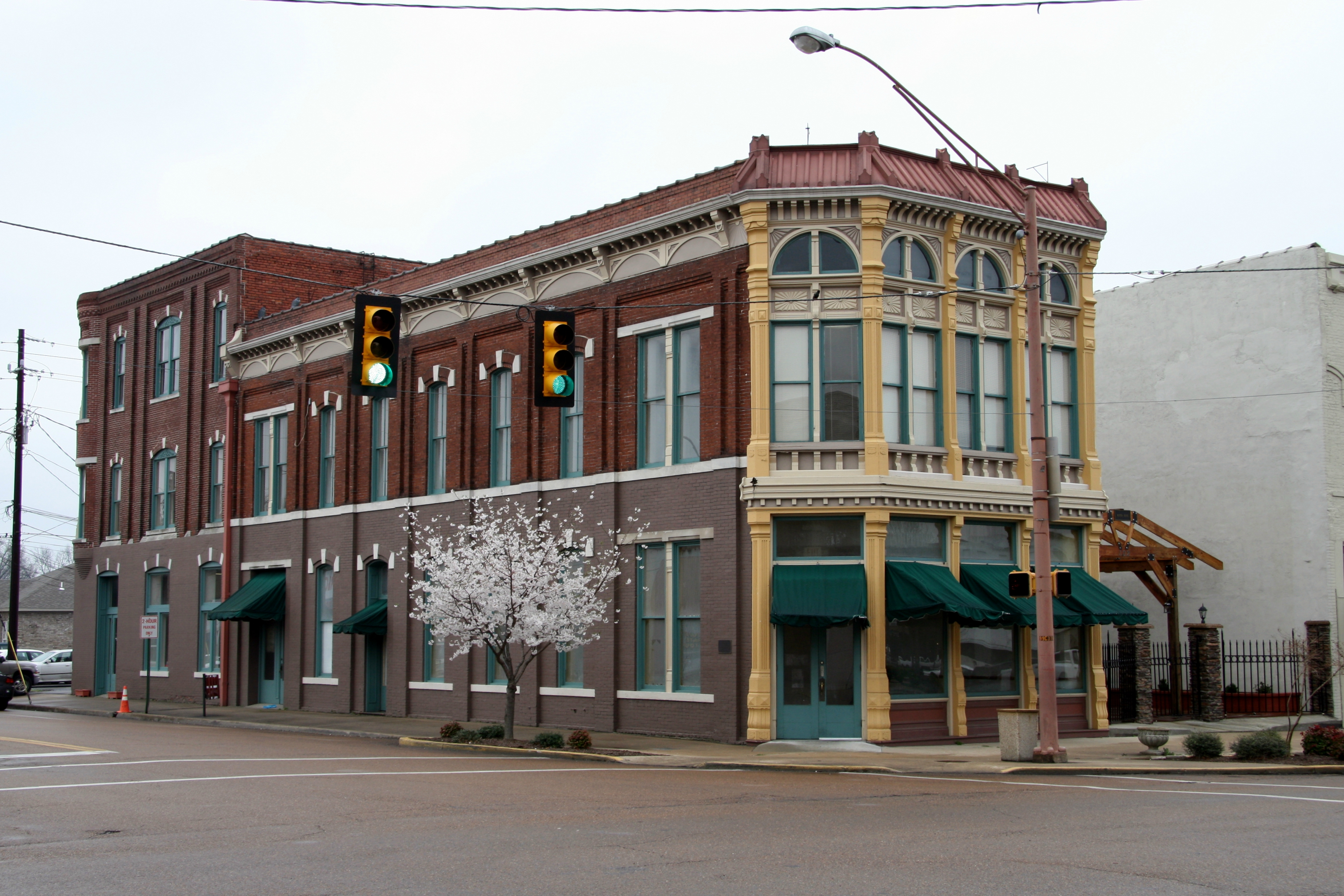

- Location within Tennessee Location within the United States
- Location: 100 N. Main St., Dyersburg, Tennessee
- Coordinates: 36°1′57″N 89°23′7″W
- Area: 0.1 acres (0.040 ha)
- Built: 1885
- Architectural style: Modern Movement
- NRHP reference No.: 83003030
- Added to NRHP: June 16, 1983

The Bank of Dyersburg is a historic building built in 1885. Located at 100 N. Main St. in Dyersburg, Tennessee, United States, it has also been known as Citizens Bank Building. It has served historically in commerce/trade functions, including as a professional building, as a specialty store, and as a financial institution. It was listed on the National Register of Historic Places in 1983 for its architecture.

== History ==
The Bank of Dyersburg received a charter and began in business in 1880. Its 1885 new building has been described as showing "a stylish mix of Second Empire and Italianate architecture."

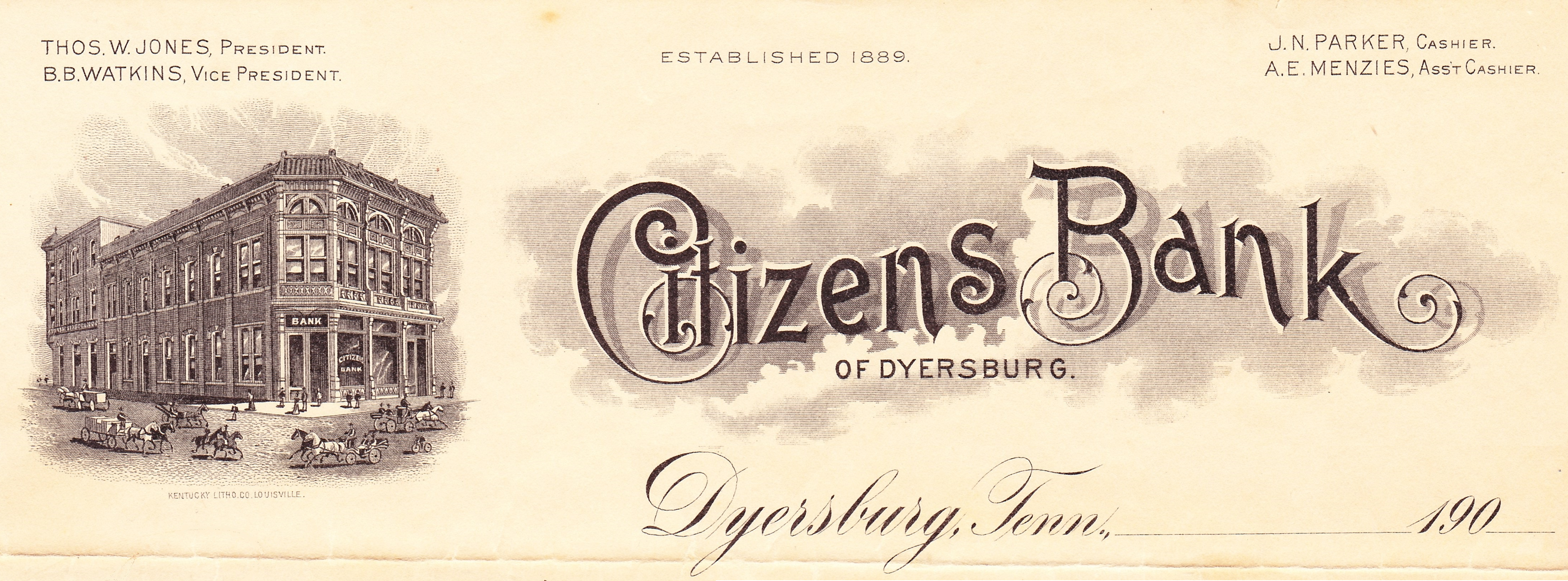
Letterhead for the bank, circa 1900

It is listed in the National Register's NRIS database as showing Modern Movement style, however.
