= Edward Moody King House =

Historic house in Tennessee, United States

- U.S. National Register of Historic Places
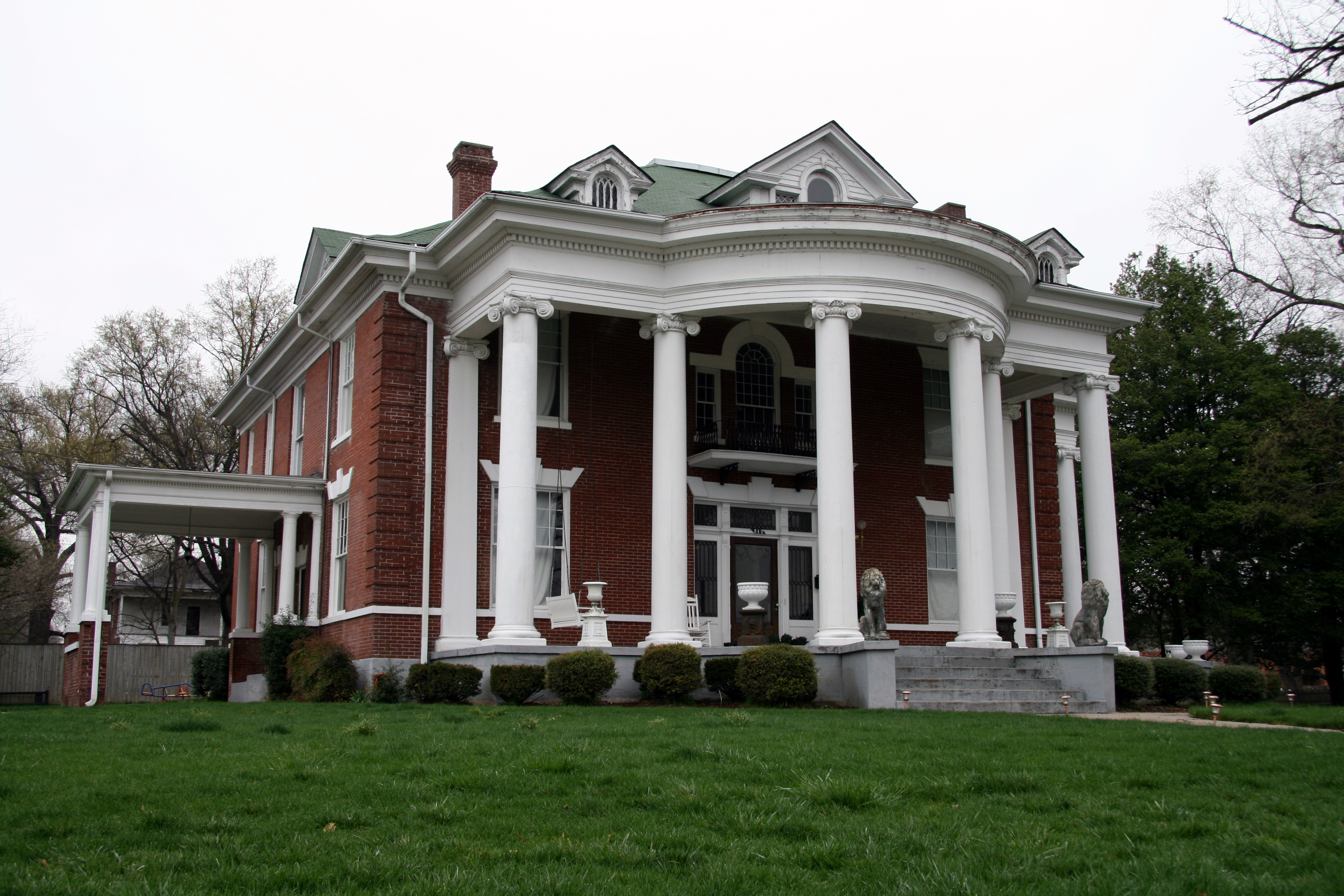
- The Edward Moody King House in 2008

- Location within Tennessee Location within the United States
- Location: 512 Finley Street, Dyersburg, Tennessee
- Coordinates: 36°2′3″N 89°23′27″W
- Area: 1.3 acres (0.53 ha)
- Built: 1905
- Architect: George Mahan, Jr.
- Architectural style: Colonial Revival
- NRHP reference No.: 90001658
- Added to NRHP: October 25, 1990

The Edward Moody King House is a historic house in Dyersburg, Tennessee, U.S.. It was built in 1905-1907 for Edward Moody King and his wife, Mary Stevens. It was designed by George Mahan, Jr. in the Colonial Revival architectural style. It has been listed on the National Register of Historic Places since October 25, 1990.
