= Neander Montgomery Woods =

American architect

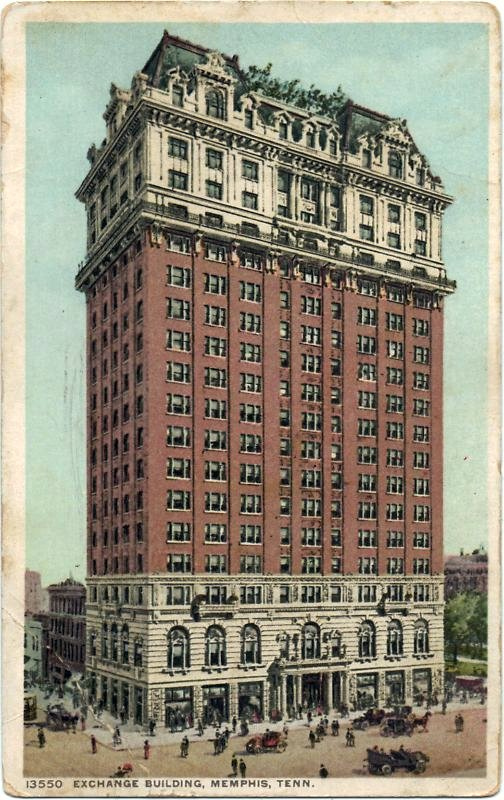
Postcard of the Exchange Building in 1911. The decorative top of the building was actually red brick rather than white.

Neander Montgomery Woods Jr. (1876 - 1956) was an architect in Memphis, Tennessee and in the northeastern United States including New York City, New Jersey, and Connecticut. His most well known building is the Exchange Building in Memphis. His work is noted along with a few other architects on a historical marker in the Central Gardens Historic District. George Mahan Jr. apprenticed with him as did Everett Woods, his younger brother who also became an architect.

Woods' father was Rev. Neander M. Woods Sr. who was born in Kentucky September 1842. Woods Sr wrote a book about the family's Scottish ancestry, The Woods-Mcafee Memorial. Woods Sr. died April 15, 1910, in Louisville, Kentucky and is buried at Cave Hill Cemetery in the city.

Woods Jr. authored the 80 page Art house printing co. publication The most house for the least money (1921).

== Work ==
- 1542 Harbert Avenue (1897) in Memphis' Central Gardens neighborhood. Designed in the Arts & Crafts style, the house is an early example of an adaptation to the Automobile Age with the front door facing the driveway under the "carport" (as it would later be known).
- Neander Woods home (1909) at 1521 Peabody Avenue in the Central Gardens area of Memphis. The third home he designed for himself.
- 665 North Trezevant Street in Hein Park, Memphis.
- Exchange Building (1910) 9 North 2nd Street. The tallest building in Memphis for 20 years after its completion.
- N. Montgomery Woods House 1400 South Wanamassa Dr. in Wanamassa, New Jersey. Also known as the Mushroom House. A "symphony in brown" according to Woods.
