= John Willard Brister Library =

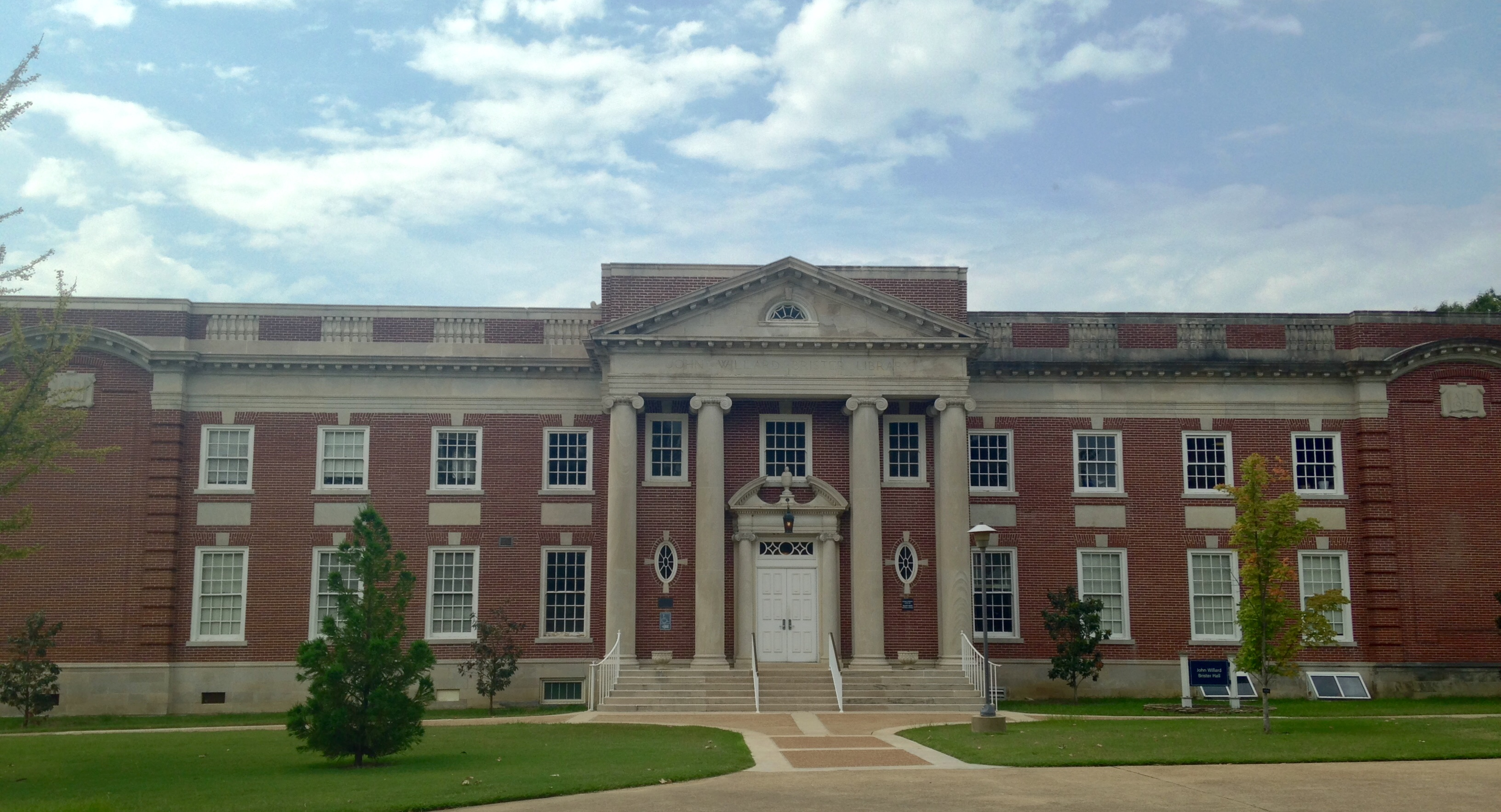

John Willard Brister Library is a historic library building on the University of Memphis campus. It is listed on the National Register of Historic Places.

It was designed by Memphis architect George Mahan Jr.

Completed in 1927, it is at 3669 Alumni Avenue. It was named for John Willard Brister who served as president of West Tennessee State Teacher's College and became the superintendent of education in Temnessee.

Brister and Seymour Mynders, the school's first president, donated their personal libraries to its collection.

The neoclassical style building was constructed of red brick and concrete. A postcard was made featuring the building.

== See also ==
- National Register of Historic Places listings in Shelby County, Tennessee
- John Willard Brister
