= Lynching of Lation Scott =

African American lynching victim

Lation Scott
- Born: December 25, 1893; Holly Springs, Mississippi, United States
- Died: December 2, 1917 (aged 23); Dyersburg, Tennessee, United States
- Cause of death: tortured and burned alive
- Other name: Ligon Scott
- Occupation: Farm hand
- Height: 6 ft 1 in (1.85 m)

Lation (Ligon) Scott (December 25, 1893 – December 2, 1917) was lynched after being suspected of raping a white woman in Dyer County, Tennessee. He was tortured, mutilated and burned alive by a mob on Sunday, December 2, 1917, in downtown Dyersburg.

== Early life ==
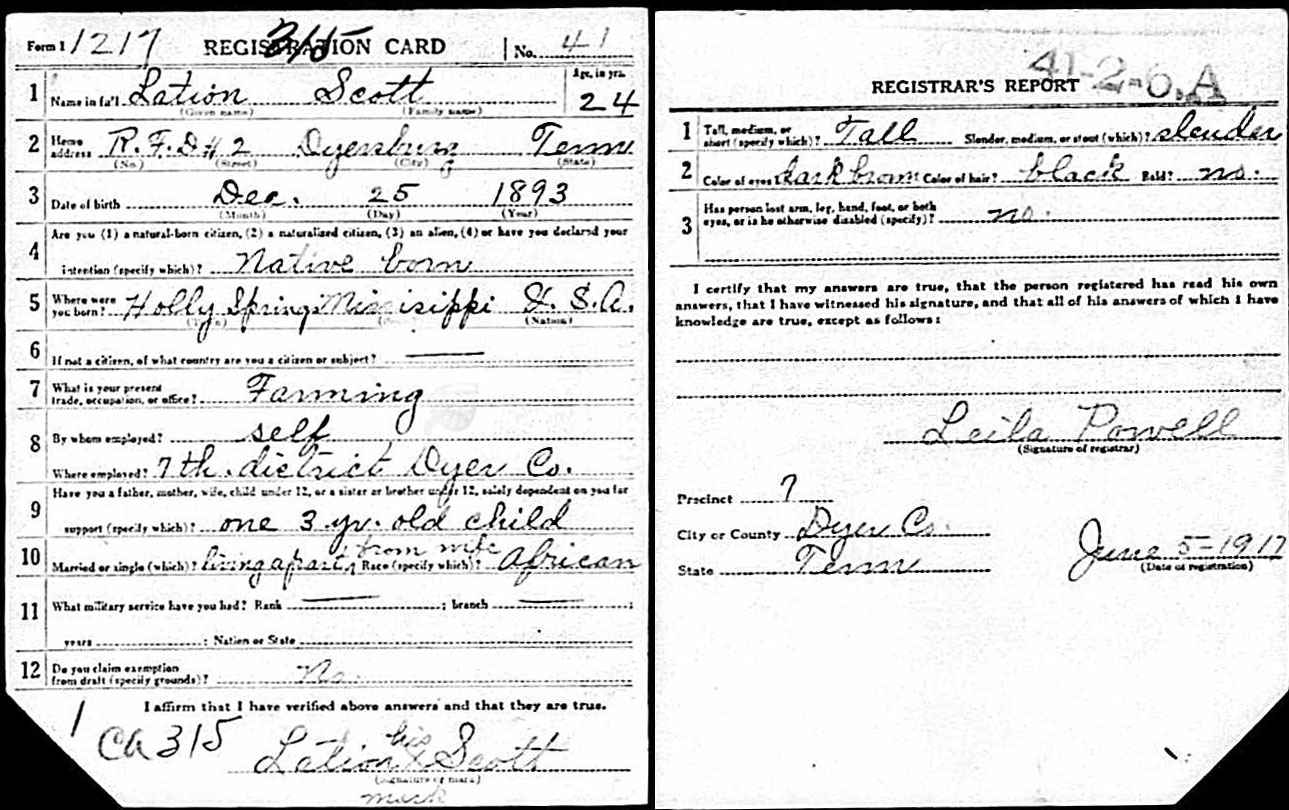
Lation Scott's draft card June 5, 1917

Scott was born in Holly Springs, Mississippi on December 25, 1893. He was married and had a three-year-old child but lived apart from his wife. Scott registered for the World War I draft on June 5, 1917, and described his occupation as farming. He was described on the form as tall and slender. (Note: Lation Scott's draft card, June 5, 1917)

== Background ==
In 1917, Scott was a farmworker who worked for a white farmer on a rented small landholding. The farmer had a 24-year-old wife and two small children. It was reported that Scott occasionally lived in the house with the farmer and his family. Some reports have said that Scott was "half-witted", and when signing his selective service application, he did not sign his name with a signature: on the form there is an X and the words "made his mark". Scott passed his physical examination and was likely to be called to service. (Note: See photo of Lation Scott's draft card, June 5, 1917) It was also said that Scott was a preacher and there were varying reports stating that he was either a Baptist or a Holy Roller.

During the day of November 22, 1917, the farmer had gone to work in town. The farmer's wife claimed that Scott locked the farmer's older child in the barn. Next, she stated that he came in the house from behind her and tied and gagged her; and then raped her.

The woman claimed that Scott did not kill her because she begged for her life. Once freed, she ran into the road and told passers-by what had happened. News spread quickly and anger grew. Latian went on the run and evaded capture for ten days. A reward of $200 was offered for his capture ($4,356.28 in 2021 dollars). Rumors about Scott were circulated, which inflamed the white searchers: one rumor said that Scott had syphilis. Later, the physician who examined Scott at the examining board said that Scott did not have syphilis because he passed his draft examination.

== Lynching ==
=== Capture ===
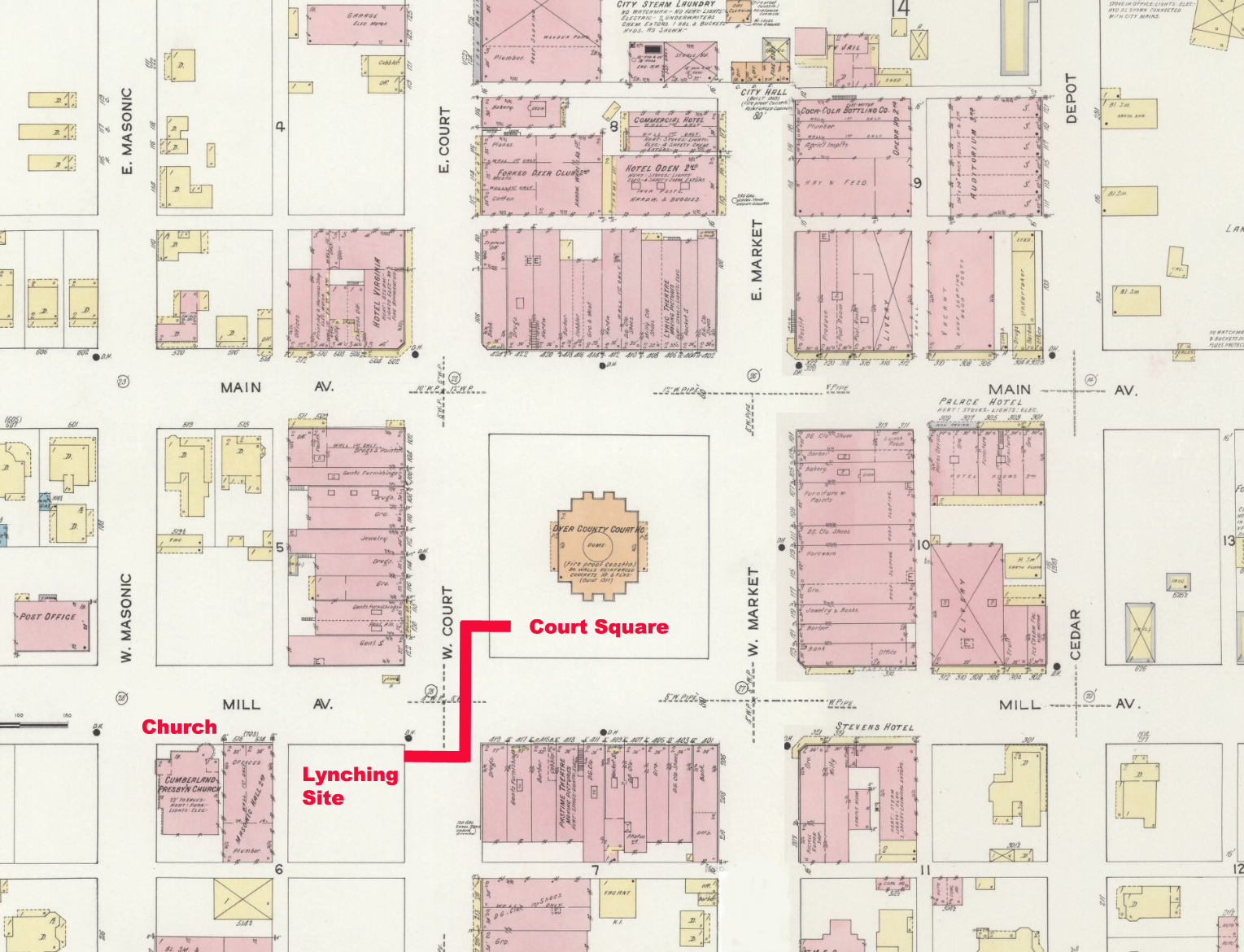
1914 fire map (3 years before the lynching) showing a vacant lot. Descriptions of the location point to this lot as the most likely Lation Scott lynching site, in Dyersburg TN

On December 1, ten days after the accusation, Scott was found. He was seeking work in Oakfield, Tennessee, and the foreman at the job recognized him. The foreman held Scott and sent for Sheriff Perry of Madison County, Tennessee. Sheriff Perry notified Sheriff Bryant of Dyer County and Bryant immediately came and moved Scott to the jail in Union City.

The police held Scott overnight and word of his arrest quickly spread to the neighboring counties. During the night, Bryant found out that many people knew where Scott was being held, so he sent a deputy and a night watchman to get Scott. It was reported that they also traveled with an undertaker and Bryant's brother-in-law. The men did not take a secret or alternate route to Dyersburg. While transporting Scott, the car was surrounded by men who blocked the road. The deputies gave up Scott and phone calls were made, while Scott was transported to Dyersburg.

Once in Dyersburg, the mob quickly obtained a confession from Scott. The leaders in the mob decided to hold a kangaroo court to determine guilt. Scott was ushered into the nearby courtroom and a jury was selected and seated. David Moss, manager of the local Phoenix Cotton Oil Mill, acted as judge and told Scott to stand up. Scott complied. Moss asked, "Are you guilty or are you not guilty?" Scott replied that he was guilty and the jury then found him guilty. Moss then addressed the mob and asked if they wanted Scott burned or hanged. He also told them "to remember that it was Sunday," and he asked them to think of the town's reputation. It was later revealed that the farmer and his wife both wanted Scott burned.

=== Torture and murder ===
Next, Scott was tortured for over three hours and burned alive before a crowd estimated at 7,000–8,000 people. Nobody in the mob wore masks to hide their faces. The Memphis Press-Scimitar reported that long before the mob reached the city the town was "choked with humanity". People waited patiently and women stood by making their babies comfortable.

A reporter for the Nashville Tennessean said that every housetop and awning in the vicinity of the pyre was covered with spectators. One eleven-year-old boy said that he was waiting for a train when he heard that the train was transporting people to a lynching. It was a 25-cent roundtrip and he decided to go and paid his fare. He said when he arrived, people all "rushed uptown" where they watched.

Reports of the torture and burning have said Scott was taken to an empty lot and chained to a buggy axle which was pounded into the ground. He was then tortured for three and a half hours. The mutilation and lynching of Scott are said to have taken place immediately after church let out on Sunday, December 2, 1917.

Scott was chained and watching while men heated hot pokers in a fire. When the irons were hot enough, someone asked if Scott had anything to say. He made some statement that most people did not listen to.

A man took one of the hot pokers and drove it into one of Scott's eye sockets. Scott was said to have been moaning and the smell of his burning flesh was immediately apparent. Then someone drove another hot poker into Scott's other eye. Next, they laid him out on the ground and used red-hot smoothing irons to burn the skin off his back and sides. They used the red-hot irons on his feet. Many people remarked that they could smell the burning flesh. He was then castrated. A hot poker was then put down his throat. Someone else drove a red hot poker into his ribs. Finally, the crowd gathered up items to fuel a fire and someone lit the fire. The fire burned, but reports say that Scott lived for some time longer while the mob continued to add firewood and rubbish to the burn pile.

== Legacy ==
An NAACP investigation found that the identity of the people who led the mob were well known throughout Dyer County but nobody was ever punished for the lynching of Scott. Some residents felt that they were doing their civic duty by lynching Scott. One man compared said of the lynching, "It was the biggest thing since the Ringling Brothers Circus came to town." Some people felt that the mob leaders were, "no better than the negro."

Scott was the last person lynched in Dyer County, Tennessee. In Margaret Vandiver's 2005 book, Lethal Punishment: Lynchings and Legal Executions in the South, she states, "The lynching of Lation Scott, was the most ghastly of all those I researched." Vandiver speculates, "Perhaps the horror of what they had done did have some effect on the white residents of the area [after Scott's death] there were no further lynchings in Dyer County.

In 2020, while people were observing the Black Lives Matter movement in Dyersburg, protestors came to downtown Dyersburg, and one person gave a speech about Scott.

== See also ==
- List of lynching victims in the United States
