= E. H. Crump House =

Historic house in Tennessee, United States

- U.S. National Register of Historic Places
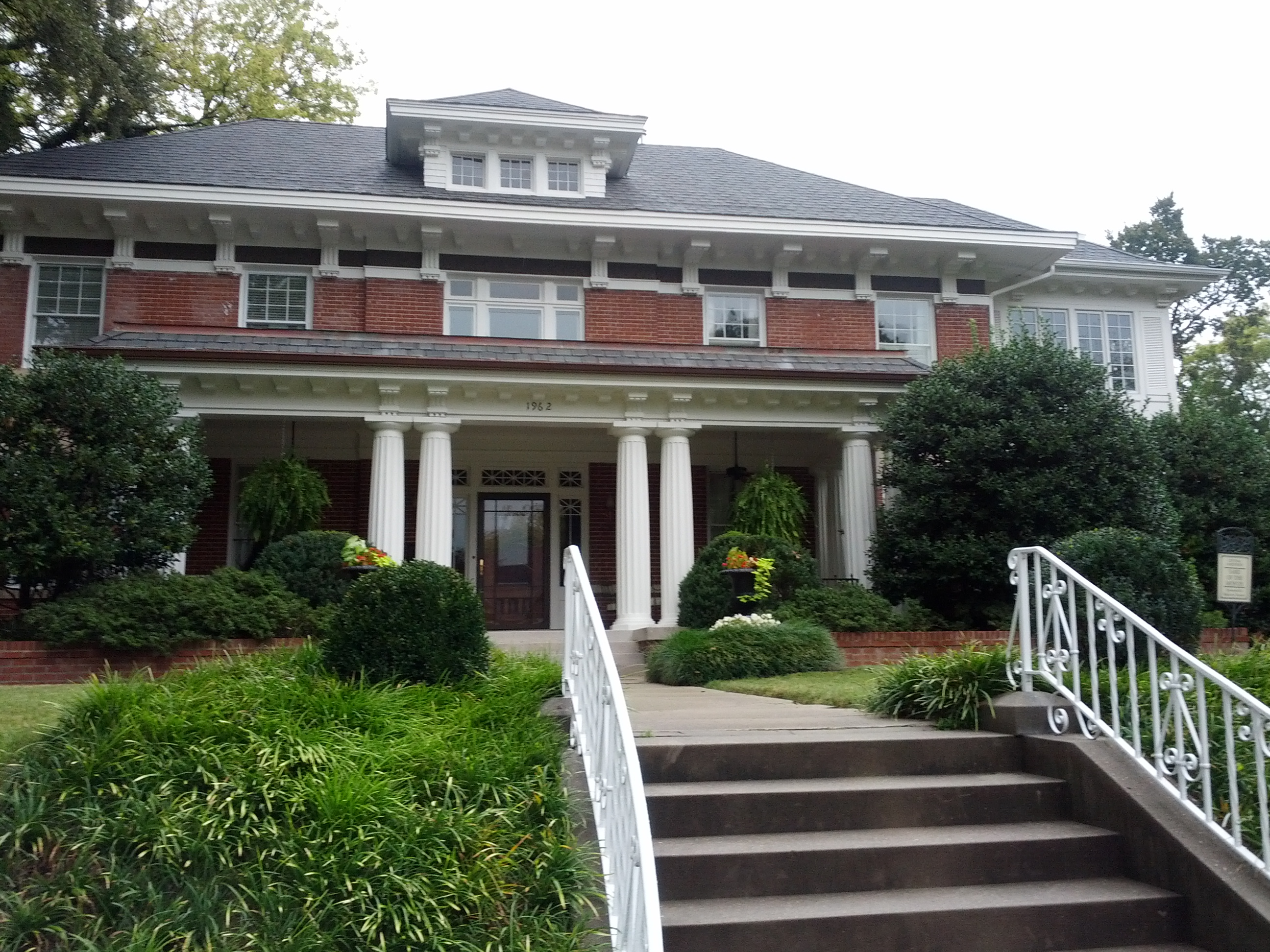
- The E. H. Crump House in 2012

- Location within Tennessee Location within the United States
- Location: 1962 Peabody Avenue, Memphis, Tennessee
- Coordinates: 35°7′55″N 89°59′45″W
- Area: 0.5 acres (0.20 ha)
- Architectural style: Colonial Revival
- NRHP reference No.: 79002465
- Added to NRHP: December 26, 1979

The E. H. Crump House is a historic house in Memphis, Tennessee. It was built in 1909 for E. H. Crump, who went on to serve as the mayor of Memphis from 1910 to 1915. It was designed by prominent Memphis architect George Mahan Jr. in the Colonial Revival architectural style with Doric columns. It has been listed on the National Register of Historic Places since December 26, 1979.
