= Michael Swift (American football) =

American football player (born 1974)

No. 26, 27, 29, 30
- Position: Cornerback

Personal information
- Born: February 28, 1974 (age 52); Dyersburg, Tennessee

Career information
- College: Austin Peay State
- NFL draft: 1996: undrafted

Career history
- San Diego Chargers (1996–1997); Rhein Fire (1997); Carolina Panthers (1998–1999); Jacksonville Jaguars (2000)
- Stats at Pro Football Reference

Michael Aaron Swift (born February 28, 1974) is a retired American football defensive back who played in 28 NFL games over the 1997–2000 seasons.
