= 1971 Colorado Aviation Aero Commander 680 crash =

Aviation accident

Coordinates: 37°21′52″N 80°13′32″W

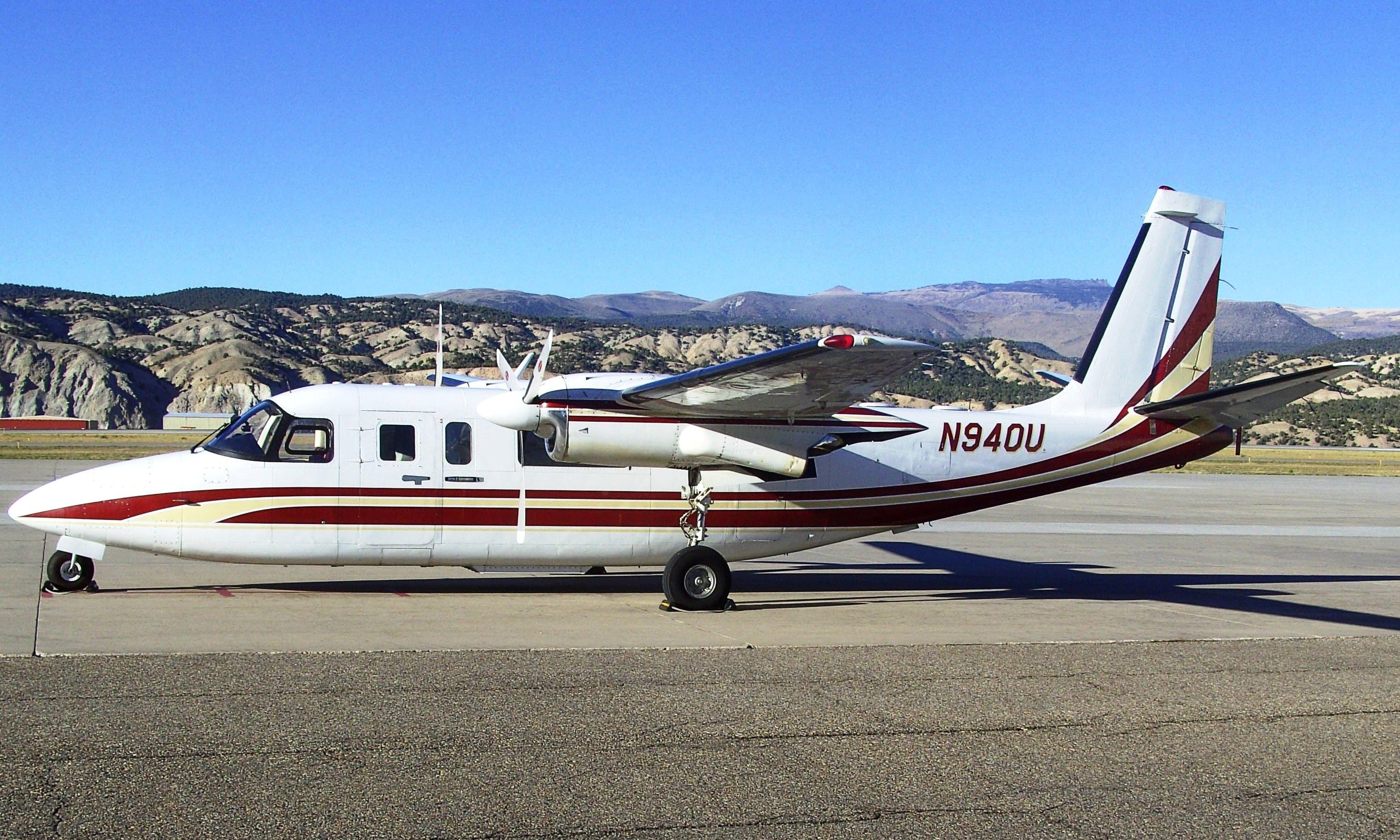
- Aero Commander 680 Super similar to the accident aircraft

Accident
- Date: 28 May 1971
- Summary: Pilot error leading to controlled flight into terrain.
- Site: Brush Mountain, Roanoke, Virginia, United States

Aircraft
- Aircraft type: Aero Commander 680 Super
- Operator: Colorado Aviation Co, Inc.
- Registration: N601JJ
- Flight origin: Atlanta, Georgia, U.S.
- Destination: Martinsville, Virginia, U.S.
- Passengers: 5
- Crew: 1
- Fatalities: 6
- Injuries: 0
- Survivors: 0

The 1971 Colorado Aviation Aero Commander 680 crash was a plane crash that killed American World War II veteran Audie Murphy and five other people on May 28, 1971. The aircraft's passengers were on a business trip from Atlanta, Georgia, to Martinsville, Virginia, aboard an Aero Commander 680 Super twin-engined aircraft owned and operated by Colorado Aviation Co, Inc. The aircraft crashed into the side of Brush Mountain, 14 nautical miles (16 mi; 26 km) northwest of Roanoke, Virginia, during conditions of poor visibility.

The National Transportation Safety Board (NTSB) concluded that the crash was caused by the pilot's decision to continue operating under visual flight rules (VFR) into instrument meteorological conditions (IMC), combined with his lack of experience in the aircraft type.

== Accident ==
On the morning of May 28, 1971, an Aero Commander 680 Super prepared to depart DeKalb–Peachtree Airport in Atlanta, operating as an unscheduled passenger air taxi flight under visual flight rules (VFR) to its destination of Blue Ridge Airport in Martinsville, Virginia, located 284 nautical miles (327 mi; 526 km) northeast. The estimated flight time was 1 hour and 46 minutes.

Before takeoff, the Aero Commander's pilot requested a weather report by phone and decided weather along the route was safe for visual flying. No flight plan was required and none was filed. Air traffic control at Peachtree cleared the flight and the aircraft departed at 09:10 EDT. As the flight continued, weather conditions deteriorated, and 2 hours and 20 minutes after takeoff, at 11:30, witnesses in Galax, Virginia (60 miles [97 km] due west of Martinsville) reported seeing the plane flying circles in and out of the clouds at approximately 150 feet (46 m) above ground level (AGL). Shortly afterward, the aircraft unsuccessfully attempted to land on a four-lane highway northwest of Galax. After making a pass over the town at near treetop level, the aircraft left the area heading west towards the Blue Ridge Mountains.

The last communication with the aircraft was at 11:49, when the pilot contacted the Federal Aviation Administration (FAA) Flight Service Station at Roanoke's Woodrum Airport asking for a weather report and saying he intended to land there. At this point, the aircraft had flown past its destination of Martinsville and was west of and below the peaks of the Blue Ridge Mountains. The latest weather report radioed by Roanoke advised measured ceiling 1,000 feet (300 m) broken, 2,500 feet (760 m) overcast, visibility 3 miles (4.8 km) in light rain and fog, with "mountain ridges obscured". The pilot did not indicate he was in any kind of trouble or report the aircraft's current position.

At 12:08, the aircraft impacted the west side of Brush Mountain at the 2,700-foot (820 m) level while flying at "high speed, level attitude" on a heading of 100° to the Roanoke VORTAC navigation beacon. The collision into the heavily wooded slope and post-crash fire destroyed the aircraft, and all six people on board received fatal injuries.

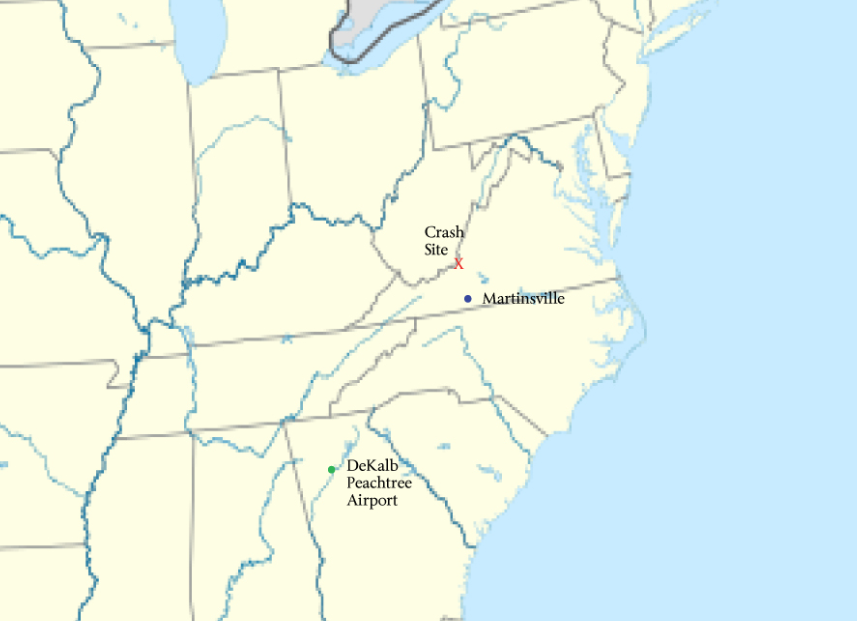
Departure and destination airport locations

== Aircraft ==
Registered as N601JJ, the aircraft was a 14-year-old 680 Super, seven-seat, light twin, type certified on October 14, 1955, and manufactured in 1957 by Aero Commander. Serial number 680-491-161 was equipped with 340 horsepower (250 kW) Lycoming GSO-480-B1A6 supercharged engines, turning Hartzell three-bladed feathering propellers. Maximum takeoff weight was 7,000 pounds (3,200 kg) with a total fuel load of 225.5 US gallons (854 L), giving a 1,480-mile (2,380 km) range at a cruise speed of 230 mph (370 km/h). Because of these features, the 680 Super is considered a complex multiengined airplane.

== Crew and passengers ==
The single crewmember was 43-year-old pilot Herman Butler, who held a valid private pilot license with airplane single- and multiengine land rating, but was not rated to fly under instrument flight rules (IFR). Butler had over 8,000 hours of flight experience, but only six hours logged in the newly acquired Aero Commander. He was also the secretary of Colorado Aviation Co., Inc., of Denver, Colorado, which owned the plane.

Among the five passengers was Audie Murphy, the most decorated U.S. veteran of World War II and a director of Colorado Aviation's parent company, Telestar Leisure Investments.

== Aftermath ==
When the aircraft failed to arrive in Martinsville, awaiting friends were told the flight had changed destinations to Roanoke. By late that afternoon, the aircraft was recognized to be missing, and a search was initiated. Civil Air Patrol in Danville began searching with help from units in Martinsville, Roanoke, Buckingham, Hillsville, and Lynchburg. The Eastern Air Search and Rescue Center at Robins Air Force Base also launched 31 aircraft in support of the search.

Due to poor weather conditions and the lack of a flight plan, the crash site was not located until May 31. Colonel Hale and Major Slusser of the Virginia Wing of the Civil Air Patrol discovered the site about 300 feet (91 m) below the summit of Brush Mountain at 2:30 in the afternoon. Later that day, rescue workers were able to reach the area after hiking up 4 miles (6.4 km) of steep terrain. Three passengers, including Murphy, had been thrown uphill from the wreckage and were identified on site. The remaining three were found within the cabin of the aircraft and were badly burned.

The news of Murphy's death was reported on the front page of many newspapers on June 1, including The New York Times and Los Angeles Times.

== Investigation ==
The accident was investigated by the National Transportation Safety Board (NTSB), and centered on the weather at the time of the crash and the pilot's abilities. No evidence was found of any preimpact malfunction of the aircraft, and in its final report, issued on June 15, 1972, the NTSB determined this official probable cause for the accident: "[T]he pilot's attempt to continue visual flight into adverse weather conditions [was] at an altitude too low to clear the mountainous terrain. The board also finds that the pilot attempted to continue flight into instrument weather conditions, which were beyond his operational capabilities."

== Civil lawsuit ==
In December 1971, Murphy's widow and two sons hired attorney Herbert Hafif and filed a $10 million lawsuit in Los Angeles District Court alleging negligence in the operation and maintenance of the aircraft. The 13 defendants included the estate of pilot Herman Butler, the estates of passengers Claude Crosby and Jack Littleton, Aero Commander, Colorado Aviation, and Telestar. In December 1975, a jury awarded the Murphy family $2.5 million ($15 million in 2025) in damages to be paid by the aircraft's owner, Colorado Aviation.

== See also ==
Other notable crashes that involved flight into adverse weather conditions include:

- The Day the Music Died, a plane crash in February 1959, which resulted in the deaths of Buddy Holly, Ritchie Valens, and "The Big Bopper" J. P. Richardson
- 1963 Camden PA-24 crash, which resulted in the death of singer Patsy Cline and three others
- Death of Stevie Ray Vaughan, which resulted from a helicopter crash in August 1990
- 1991 Vallejo helicopter crash, which resulted in the death of promoter Bill Graham and two others
- 2020 Calabasas helicopter crash, which resulted in the death of basketball player Kobe Bryant and eight others
