= 1963 Camden PA-24 crash =

1963 accident which killed Patsy Cline

Coordinates: 36°03′44″N 88°09′38″W

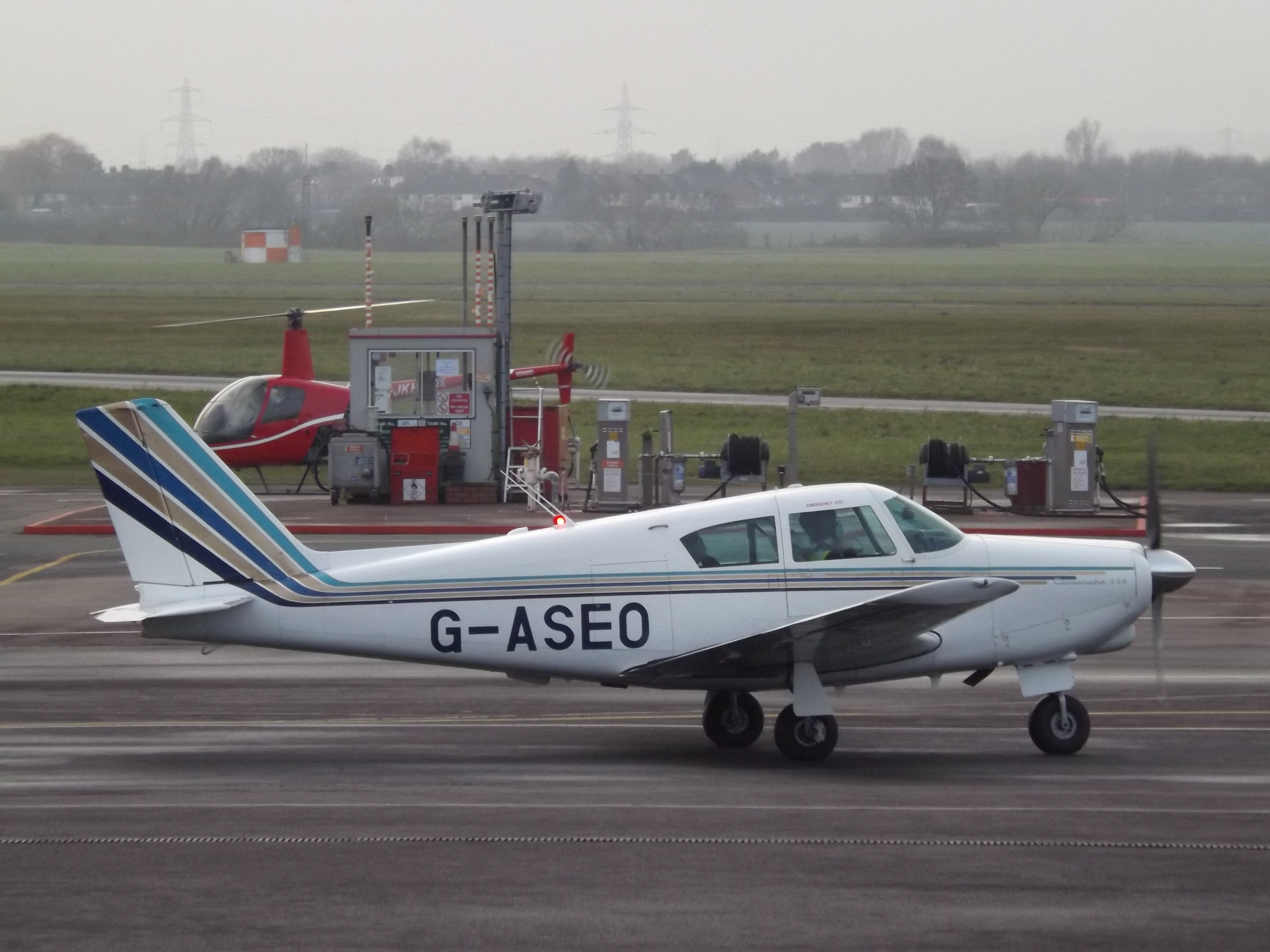
- A Piper PA-24 Comanche, similar to the aircraft involved

Accident
- Date: March 5, 1963; 63 years ago
- Summary: Pilot error leading to spatial disorientation and subsequent loss of control
- Site: Camden, Tennessee, United States

Aircraft
- Aircraft type: Piper PA-24-250 Comanche
- Registration: N7000P
- Flight origin: Kansas City, Kansas
- Destination: Nashville, Tennessee
- Occupants: 4
- Passengers: 3
- Crew: 1
- Fatalities: 4
- Survivors: 0

On March 5, 1963, the American country music performers Patsy Cline, Hawkshaw Hawkins, Cowboy Copas, and pilot Randy Hughes were killed in an airplane crash near Camden, Tennessee, United States. Hughes was also Cline's manager and Copas' son-in-law. The accident occurred as the four occupants were returning home to Nashville, Tennessee, after performing in Kansas City, Kansas.

Shortly after takeoff from a refueling stop, Hughes lost control of the small Piper PA-24 Comanche while flying in low-visibility conditions, and crashed into a wooded area, leaving no survivors. Investigators concluded that the crash was caused by the non-instrument-rated pilot's decision to operate under visual flight rules in instrument meteorological conditions.

== Accident ==
Around 2 pm on Tuesday, March 5, 1963, the Piper Comanche, piloted by Randy Hughes, departed Fairfax Municipal Airport in Kansas City, Kansas. It was operating as an unscheduled cross-country passenger flight under visual flight rules (VFR) to its destination of Nashville, 411 nautical miles (761 km; 473 mi) to the southeast. Later that afternoon, the aircraft landed to refuel at Rogers Municipal Airport in Rogers, Arkansas, and departed 15 minutes later.

Hughes later made contact with Dyersburg Regional Airport in Dyersburg, Tennessee, and landed there at 5:05 pm, where he requested a weather briefing for the remainder of the flight to Nashville. He was informed by Federal Aviation Administration (FAA) employee Leroy Neal that local conditions were marginal for VFR flight and weather at the destination airport was below VFR minima. Hughes then asked if the Dyersburg runways were lit at night in case he had to return and Neal replied that they were. Hughes then informed Neal he would fly east towards the Tennessee River and navigate to Nashville from there, as he was familiar with the terrain in that area. He expressed concern about a 2,049-foot-high (625 m) television transmitting tower north of Nashville, then stated that he would attempt the flight and return if the weather conditions worsened.

After refueling, the passengers and pilot reboarded the Piper Comanche. Hughes requested another weather briefing by radio, then taxied into position and took off at 6:07 pm. After takeoff, no further radio contact was made with N7000P. The reported weather at that time was a ceiling of 500 feet (150 m), visibility of 5 miles (8.0 km), temperature of 43 °F (6 °C), gusty and turbulent wind from the east at 20 miles per hour (17 kn; 32 km/h), and cloudy. A short time later, an aviation-qualified witness, about 4 miles (6.4 km) west of Camden, heard a low-flying aircraft on a northerly course. The engine noise increased; seconds later, a white light appeared from the overcast, descending at a 45° angle.

At 6:29 pm, the aircraft crashed into a wooded, swampy area 1 mile (1.6 km) north of U.S. Route 70 and 5 miles (8.0 km) west of Camden. The aircraft was destroyed on impact and all four occupants were killed. The witness described hearing a dull-sounding crash, followed by complete silence.

== Aircraft and crew ==
Registered as N7000P, the aircraft was a three-year-old PA-24-250 Comanche four-seat, light, single-engined airplane manufactured in 1960 by Piper Aircraft. Serial Number 24-2144 was equipped with a Lycoming O-540-A1D5 250 hp (190 kW) normally aspirated engine, turning a constant-speed propeller. The Comanche's maximum takeoff weight was 2,800 lb (1,300 kg) with a total fuel load of 60 US gallons (230 L), giving a range of 600 nm at 75% power including a 45-minute reserve. The aircraft had passed its last FAA inspection on April 19, 1962.

The owner and sole pilot of the aircraft was Randy Hughes. Hughes held a valid private pilot certificate with an airplane single-engined land rating, but was not rated to fly under instrument flight rules. Hughes had taken possession of the airplane in 1962, less than a year before the crash, and was an inexperienced pilot with a total flight time of 160.2 hours, including 44:25 logged in the Piper Comanche.

== Aftermath and investigation ==
After the witness notified the Tennessee Highway Patrol, two law enforcement officers performed a preliminary search of the area around 7 pm, but they found nothing. By 11:30 pm, a search party was organized consisting of the Highway Patrol, Civil Defense, and local officers who searched the area throughout the night. At 6:10 am on March 6, the wreckage was discovered. A three-foot hole indicated the area of initial impact, and debris was scattered over an area 166 feet (51 m) long and 130 feet (40 m) wide.

During the FAA investigation, the aircraft's propeller was found to have contacted a tree 30 feet (9.1 m) above the ground while the aircraft was in a 26° nose-down attitude. The right wing then collided with another tree 32 feet (9.8 m) to the right, causing the airplane to become inverted. The downward angle increased to 45° and the Comanche hit the ground at an estimated speed of 175 miles per hour (282 km/h), about 62 feet (19 m) from the initial contact.

Inspection of the airframe and engine disclosed that the aircraft was intact and the engine was developing substantial power before impacting the trees. Investigators found no evidence of engine or system failure or malfunction of the aircraft prior to the crash. The airplane was determined to be slightly over maximum gross weight when it departed Dyersburg airport, but this fact had no bearing on the crash. An autopsy of the pilot discovered no physical or medical concerns that could have been a factor in the accident.

Investigators believe that Hughes entered an area of deteriorating weather with low visibility and lost his visual reference with the ground. This induced spatial disorientation, and eventually led to a graveyard spiral with the aircraft entering into a right-hand diving turn, with a nose-down attitude of 25°. When the aircraft cleared the clouds, Hughes attempted to arrest the high descent rate by pulling the nose up and applying full power, but it was too late. The FAA investigators later found evidence that the propeller was at maximum speed during impact.

The FAA's final conclusion was the non-instrument-rated pilot attempted visual flight in adverse weather conditions, resulting in disorientation and subsequent loss of control.

== See also ==
- 1959 The Day the Music Died
- 1969 Newton Cessna 172 crash
- 1971 Colorado Aviation Aero Commander 680 crash
- 1972 Puerto Rico DC-7 crash
- 1977 Mississippi CV-240 crash
- 1999 John F. Kennedy Jr. plane crash
