= East High School (Tennessee) =

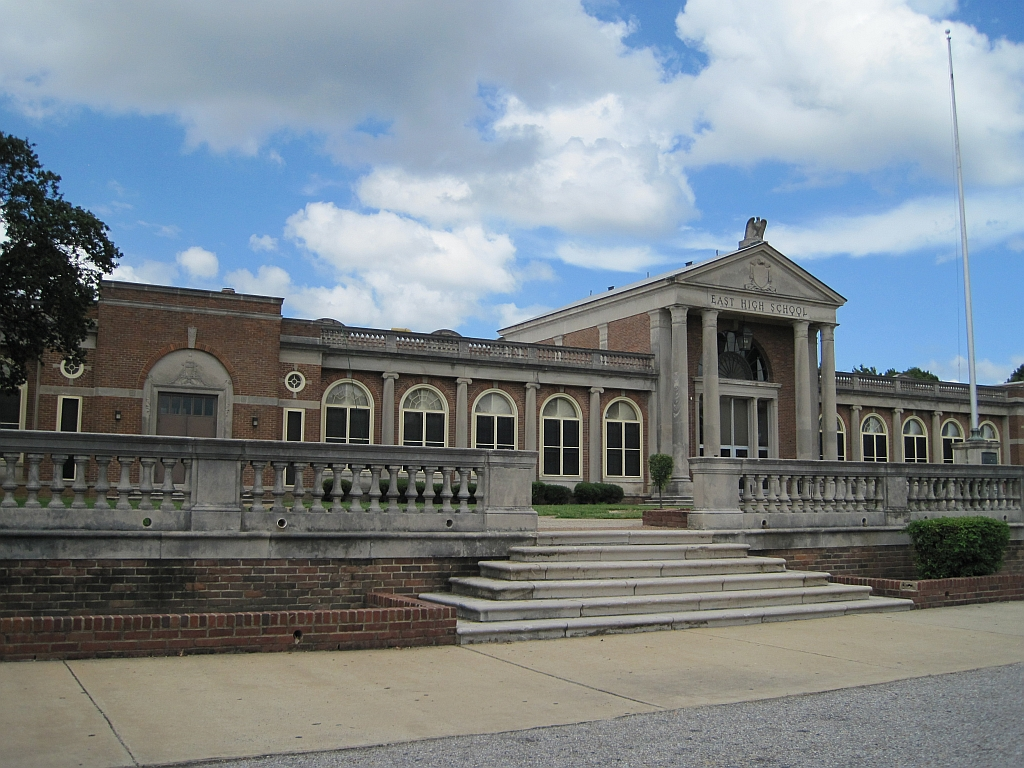

Location
- 3206 Poplar Avenue; Memphis, Tennessee 38111; United States; 35°07′55″N 89°57′14″W

Information
- Type: Public
- Opened: September 9, 1948; 78 years ago
- School district: Memphis-Shelby County Schools
- NCES School ID: 470014801053
- Principal: Pamela McKinley (2022-present)
- Teaching staff: 43.30 (FTE) (2023-2024)
- Grades: 9 to 12
- Enrollment: 615 (2023-2024)
- Student to teacher ratio: 14.20 (2023-2024)
- Colors: Maroon and Grey
- Fight song: Fight On East High (On, Wisconsin!)
- Athletics conference: TSSAA
- Mascot: Mustang
- Website: schools.scsk12.org/east-hs

East High School is a public four-year magnet high school located in Memphis, Tennessee. East originally opened in 1948, as a K–12 school, and became exclusively a high-school in 2008. It is the first magnet school in the Memphis-Shelby County Schools district that specializes in both transportation and STEM. The building has also hosted Maxine Smith STEAM Academy since 2022.

== History ==
In February 1944, the City Board of Education announced plans to construct a combined elementary, middle, and high school at the intersection of Poplar and Holmes alongside other major postwar construction and repair projects. The new school was intended to relieve crowding at Messick, Memphis State Training School, and Treadwell. The building was designed by architect Everett D. Woods and construction began in 1946. The first classes of grades K-10 took place in September 1948, with 11th and 12th grade being added in 1949 and 1950 respectively.

In 1976, a separate building was built adjacent to East's rear parking lot, originally housing East VoTech, a vocational program. Another smaller building was built in 1984, connecting to the East VoTech building and housing facilities for the main school. 1984-1985 was also the last year for the elementary school, with the classrooms being given to the middle and high school section.

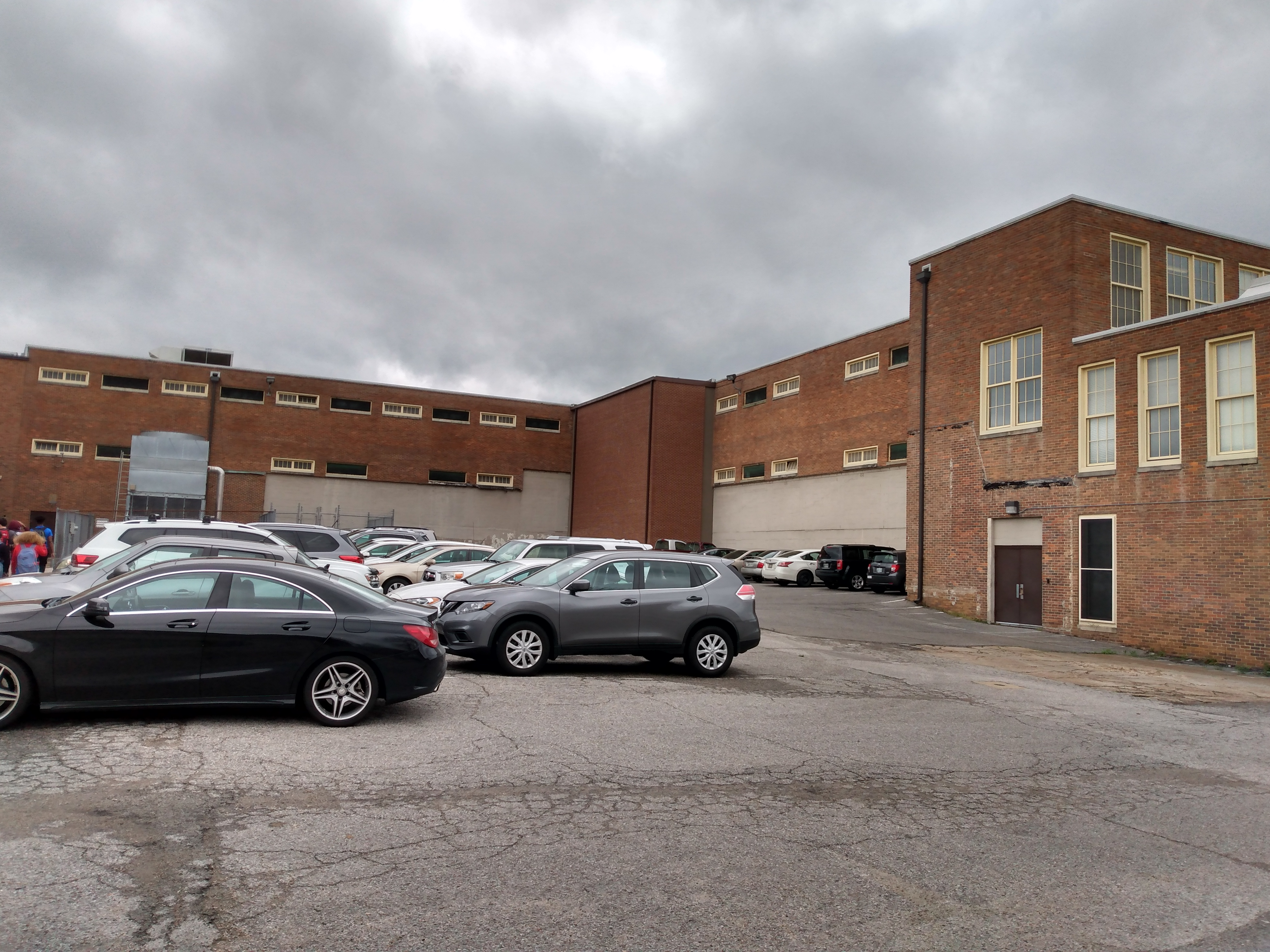
The location of the former annex in 2021

On November 13, 2002, five classrooms in the Annex and southwest wing of the main building were closed and cleaned after black mold was discovered inside. The following weekend, senior Criss Mister died after suffering an asthma attack, leading to student protests and heightening parents' concerns. In March 2003, the Annex was demolished. An elevator and six ADA-accessible restrooms (two per floor) were built in its place.

A $12.8 million renovation was completed during the summer of 2007. The renovation was started in October 2005 with the renovation of the auditorium; the windows were bricked over, ADA accessibility features were added, the wooden seating was replaced with plastic ones, and a new media booth was built in the rear of the auditorium. The renovation also included drop ceilings throughout the entire school; new fluorescent lighting, HVAC, and water pipes located within the drop ceilings; and new tile flooring in the halls.

In January 2017, East High announced its T-STEM optional program, partnering with University of Memphis, FedEx, and AutoZone to develop the new curriculum. The following fall, the T-STEM Academy was established, with all non-qualifying students being rezoned to other high schools. It is the first T-STEM school in Shelby County Schools.

On April 19, 2021, SCS revealed their "Reimagine 901" facilities plan, which involves the creation of more K-8 and 6-12 schools to smoothen building transitions for students. The following spring, it was announced that Maxine Smith STEAM Academy, also known as MSSA, would be relocated to East High School. At the time, MSSA shared a building with Middle College High School at 750 East Parkway. The relocation was completed before the fall 2022 school year despite resistance.

== Academics ==
=== Enrollment ===
As of the 2023-2024 school year, East High has an enrollment of 615 students.

- Asian - 0.5%
- Black - 68.3%
- Hispanic - 10.2%
- White - 13.2%
- Multiple Races - 7.8%

=== Curriculum ===
East High School offers vocational education focusing on transportation in addition to traditional STEM careers. The aviation elective course prepares students for drone license and private pilot license exams. East also has audio-visual production course.

== Athletics ==
East has numerous sports varsity teams, including baseball/softball, basketball, cross country/track, football, golf, soccer, volleyball, and wrestling. The basketball team won three consecutive state titles between 2016 and 2018 under Penny Hardaway, before he began coaching for the University of Memphis. In September 2022, East High was fined nearly $15,000 by the TSSAA and stripped of its 2018-19 post-season titles after Hardaway was found to have violated recruiting rules in bringing James Wiseman to East from Nashville.

== Notable alumni ==
- Eric Banks, football player
- Qwynnterrio Cole, strong safety for the St. Louis Battlehawks
- Kirk Fordice, Mississippi governor (1992-2000)
- Anne Haney, actress
- Cedric Henderson, basketball player
- Will Redmond, football player
- Cybill Shepherd, actress, singer and model
- Shelby Tucker, Anglo-American journalist, novelist and attorney
- James Wiseman, basketball player for the Detroit Pistons, 2019 Gatorade National Basketball Player of the Year
- Paul Young, Memphis mayor (2024–present)
