= Dyersburg, Tennessee =

- City
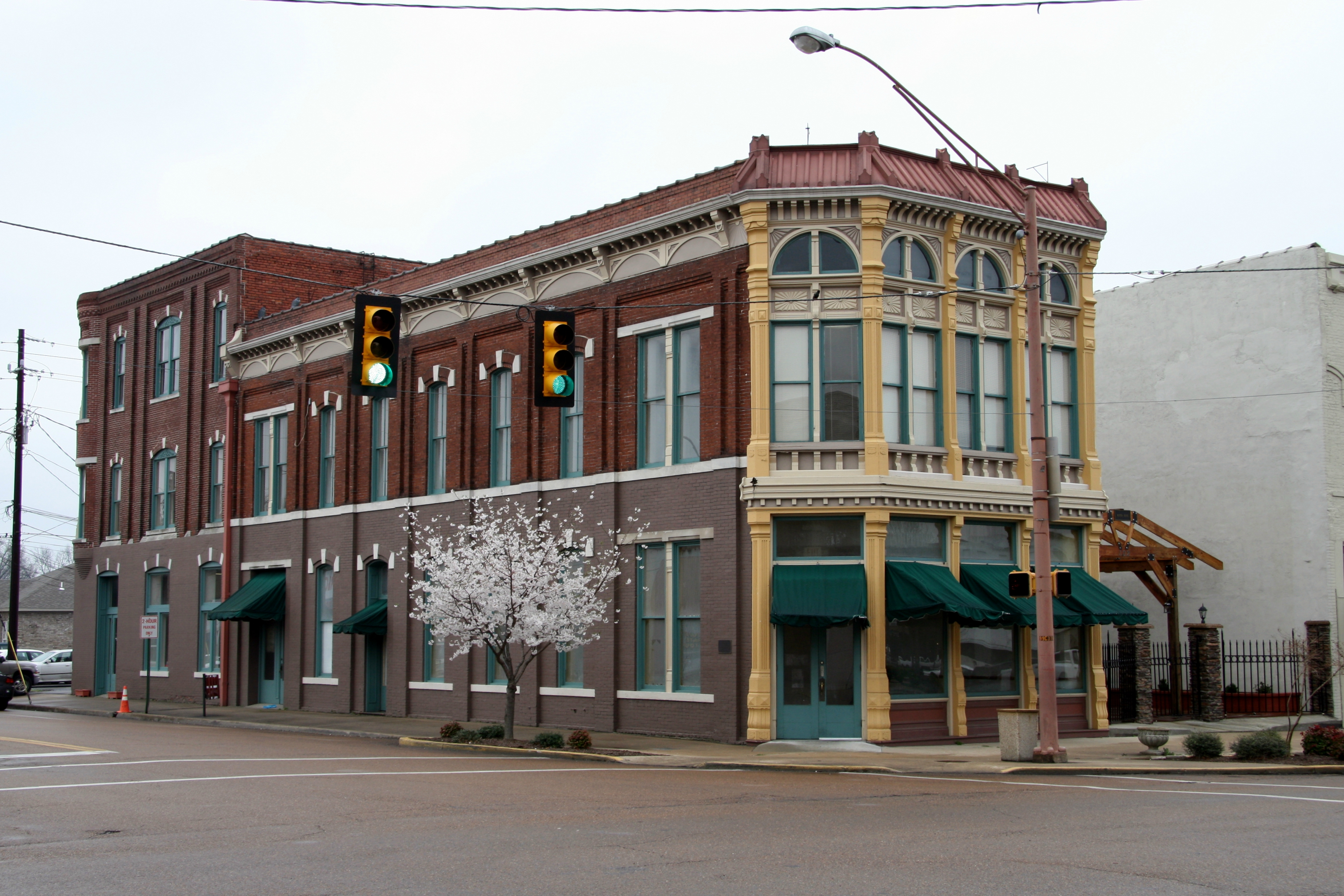
- The Bank of Dyersburg building, listed on the National Register of Historic Places

- Seal
- Motto: "Dyersburg...the Gateway to Everywhere"
- Location of Dyersburg in Dyer County, Tennessee.
- Coordinates: 36°2′N 89°23′W
- Country: United States
- State: Tennessee
- County: Dyer
- First Settled: 1819
- Established: 1826
- Incorporated: January 10, 1850
- Named for: Col. Robert H. Dyer (1774-1826)

Government
  - Mayor: John Holden

Area
  - Total: 17.43 sq mi (45.15 km^{2})
  - Land: 17.32 sq mi (44.86 km^{2})
  - Water: 0.11 sq mi (0.29 km^{2})
- Elevation: 312 ft (95 m)

Population (2020)
  - Total: 16,164
  - Density: 933.3/sq mi (360.35/km^{2})
- Time zone: UTC-6 (CST)
  - Summer (DST): UTC-5 (CDT)
- ZIP codes: 38024-38025
- Area code: 731
- FIPS code: 47-22200
- GNIS feature ID: 1283267
- Website: www.dyersburgtn.gov

Dyersburg is a city in and the county seat of Dyer County, Tennessee, United States. It is located in northwest Tennessee, 79 miles (127 km) northeast of Memphis on the Forked Deer River. The population was 16,164 at the 2020 census, down 5.72% from the 2010 census.

== History ==
=== Early history ===
The lands encompassing Dyersburg were originally inhabited by the Chickasaw people. As westward expansion continued, the Chickasaw Nation relinquished their claims to West Tennessee through a series of treaties, culminating in the final agreement, the Treaty of Tuscaloosa, signed in 1818. The lands composing the future Dyer County were then transferred, via the Jackson Purchase, to the US Government, and American settlers from the eastern states began moving into West Tennessee around 1819.

=== 19th century ===
In 1823, the Tennessee General Assembly established two new counties immediately west of the Tennessee River, Dyer County being one of them. John McIver and Joel H. Dyer donated 60 acres (240,000 m^{2}) for the new county seat, aptly named Dyersburg, at a central location within the county known as "McIver's Bluff". Dyer surveyed the town in 1825, laying out 86 lots. The county (and county seat) were named for Joel Dyer's father, Colonel Robert Henry Dyer. Col. Dyer served as the first postmaster of Dyersburg, and sat on its first chancery court. The first courthouse, a two-story log cabin, was constructed on the town square in 1827. It was replaced by a one-story frame building in 1836.

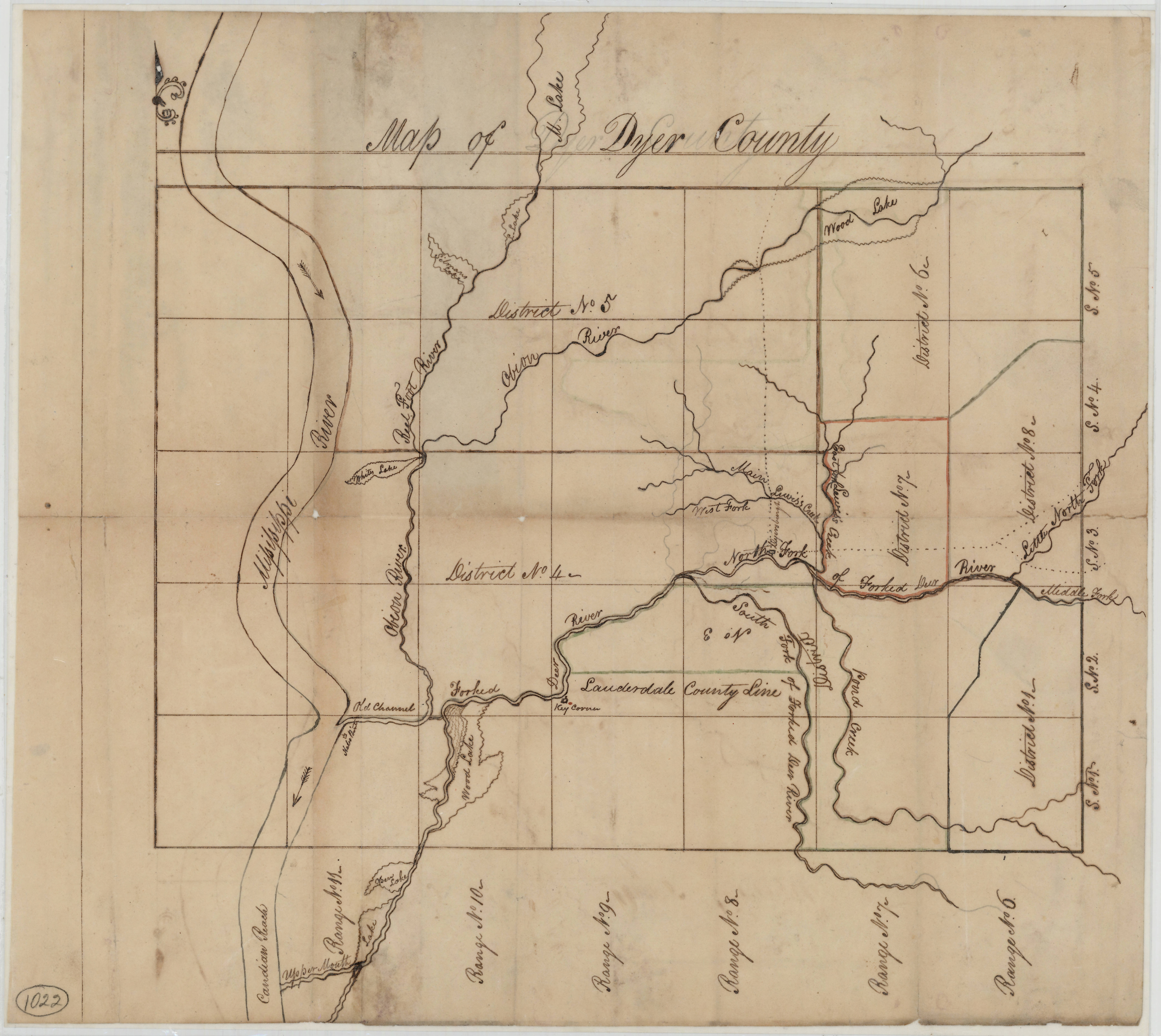
Map of Dyer County, Tennessee (1836)

One of the earlier settlers was McCullouch family. Alexander McCullouch, a War of 1812 veteran who served as aid-de-camp under John Coffee at the Battle of Horseshoe Bend, moved his family in the late 1820s to a plantation west of Dyersburg from northern Alabama. He operated a general store in town for a number of years prior to his death in 1854.

Dyersburg's early development hinged on its strategic location as a hub for steamboat navigation on the Forked Deer River. The success of the Grey Eagle's maiden voyage in 1836 solidified Dyersburg's status as a river town. The county's first industrial boom commenced in 1879 with the shipment of timber from A. M. Stevens Lumber Company to St. Louis markets via steamboat. This paved the way for further investments in timber processing, with the establishment of a large sawmill in 1880 and a planing mill in 1885. The financial sector also saw growth with the opening of the Bank of Dyersburg in 1880, while another timber industry, Nichols & Co. Wooden Bowl Factory, began operations in 1881.

=== Civil War ===
During the Civil War, Dyersburg witnessed several skirmishes, ultimately resulting in Union victories. On August 7, 1862, about 50 men of the 6th Illinois Cavalry Regiment attacked a group of Confederates about 5 miles east of Dyersburg. In a report by Brigadier General Grenville M. Dodge, he wrote the Confederates who escaped left without their clothes, arms, or horses and said that "they killed some 25 to 30 [Confederates], took 53 horses, and a large number of guns & arms." Dodge also recommended burning the county as "They pay no attention to the oath, feed and guide the rebels." He reported they were assisted in routing the Confederates by "two Negros" and that "No white man had the pluck to do it." On August 18, 1862, the 6th Illinois Cavalry Regiment attacked a small band of Confederates on the Obion River six miles from Dyersburg taking all their horses, arms, and ammunition.

On January 30, 1863, the Skirmish at Dyersburg was fought. Confederate soldiers from Dawson's Guerrilla Band spent the day skirmishing near the Forked Deer River bridge in Downtown Dyersburg with men from the Third Michigan Cavalry. Near midnight, Union forces under the command of Colonel Oliver Wood of the 22nd Ohio Infantry Regiment located the rebel stronghold in a house near the bridge and "completely routed them [Confederates], killing 2, wounding 4, and capturing 17, when the rebels broke and fled in every direction." Nathan Bedford Forrest and Robert V. Richardson occupied Dyersburg in August 1863, before retreating upon the arrival of Colonel Edward Hatch in the area. The following year, the third courthouse, a two-story brick building constructed in 1850, was destroyed in a fire.

=== Late 19th-Early 20th Century ===
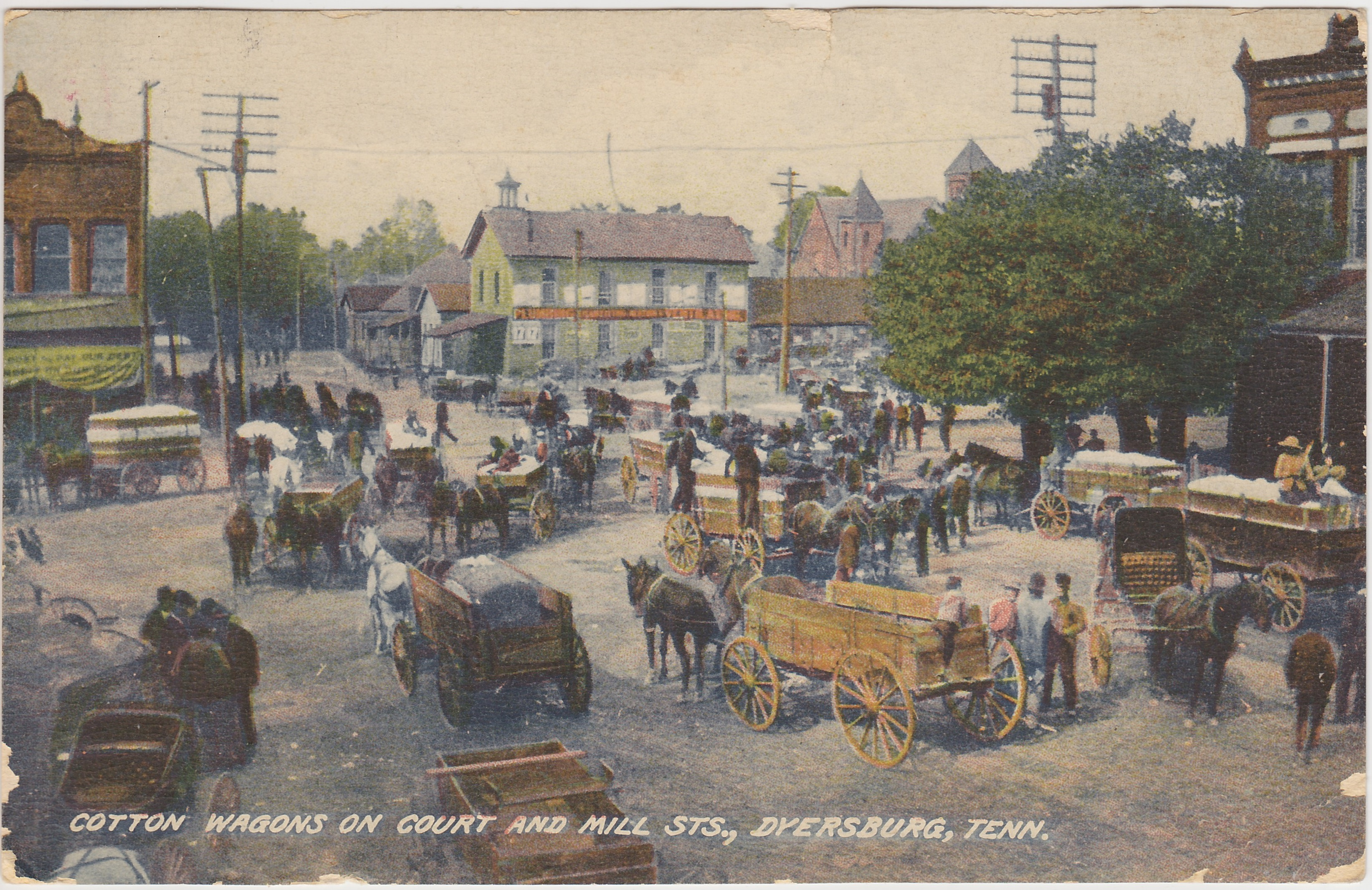
1890s postcard

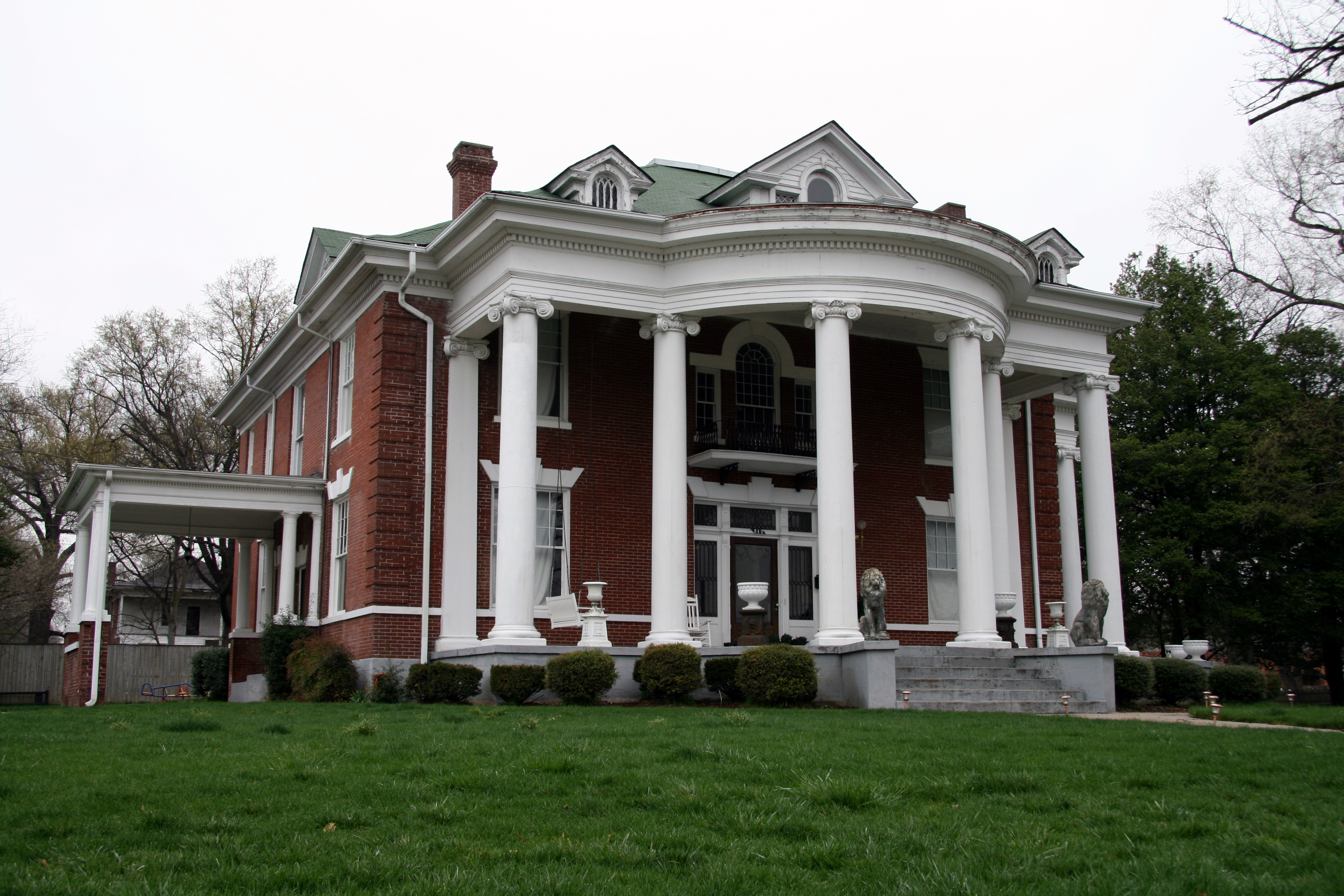
The Edward Moody King House is on the National Register of Historic Places.

In June 1883, the Chesapeake, Ohio, & Southwestern Railroad (successor to the failed Memphis, Paducah, & Northern Railroad) completed the 54 mile rail gap in Dyer, Lauderdale, and Tipton counties, between Trimble Station and Covington, TN. This new line brought a rail connection to the town. Another railroad, the Dyersburg Northern (later the Chicago, Memphis, and Gulf Railroad), was chartered in 1904 and began operation in 1907 to run trains from Dyersburg to neighboring Lake County and its seat Tiptonville. The new railroad links encouraged the creation of new industries and businesses. In 1884, for example, investors established the Dyersburg Oil Company, a cottonseed factory. This company remained locally important through the 20th century.

The 20th century saw Dyersburg emerge as a crucial railroad hub. By 1914, it became the junction point for three different lines, led by the Illinois Central Railroad. A new courthouse, the fifth in the county, was constructed on the side of the previous edifies in 1911. This new building, designed by local architect Asa Biggs, is a three-story brick building topped with a white dome that has four clock faces.

In 1916, Julius Morgan was convicted of raping Laura Sullivan of Dyersburg and became the first person to be executed by the electric chair in Tennessee.

In 1917, William Thomas, a black man, was lynched for allegedly shooting a police officer. That same year, Lation Scott, a 24-year-old black farmhand, was lynched by a white mob before a crowd of eight thousand.

=== Mid-Late 20th Century ===
The Works Progress Administration constructed a new high three-story school in 1939 to replace the previous building that was constructed in the 1880s. This project was overseen by John M. Carmody. In 1942, Dyersburg Army Air Base was established by the War Department to facilitate and support military bomber training. The Dyersburg was originally selected to host the facility, but due to a lack of developable flat land in the vicinity of the town the base was instead constructed at Halls, TN, and an auxiliary field was constructed south of downtown. A museum is currently located at the site of the former air base.

On March 5, 1963, a Piper Comanche plane carrying country singers Patsy Cline, Hawkshaw Hawkins, Cowboy Copas, and Cline's manager & pilot Randy Hughes stopped to refuel at the Dyersburg Regional Airport. The plane crashed around 20 minutes later in inclement weather near Camden, Tennessee. In 1965, the Illinois Central Railroad ceased providing passenger service to the town in Dyer County, including Dyersburg. During the Vietnam Conflict, Dyersburg native James A. Gardner posthumously won the Medal of Honor for his actions during Operation Van Buren. On the night of July 25, 1975, an arsonist firebombed the federal building in Dyersburg. Frank Maynard, a city police investigator, witnessed the arson, gave chase, and was shot by the suspect a few blocks away.

In 1990, Boss Hoss Cycles was founded by Dyersburg resident Monte Warren.

=== 21st century ===
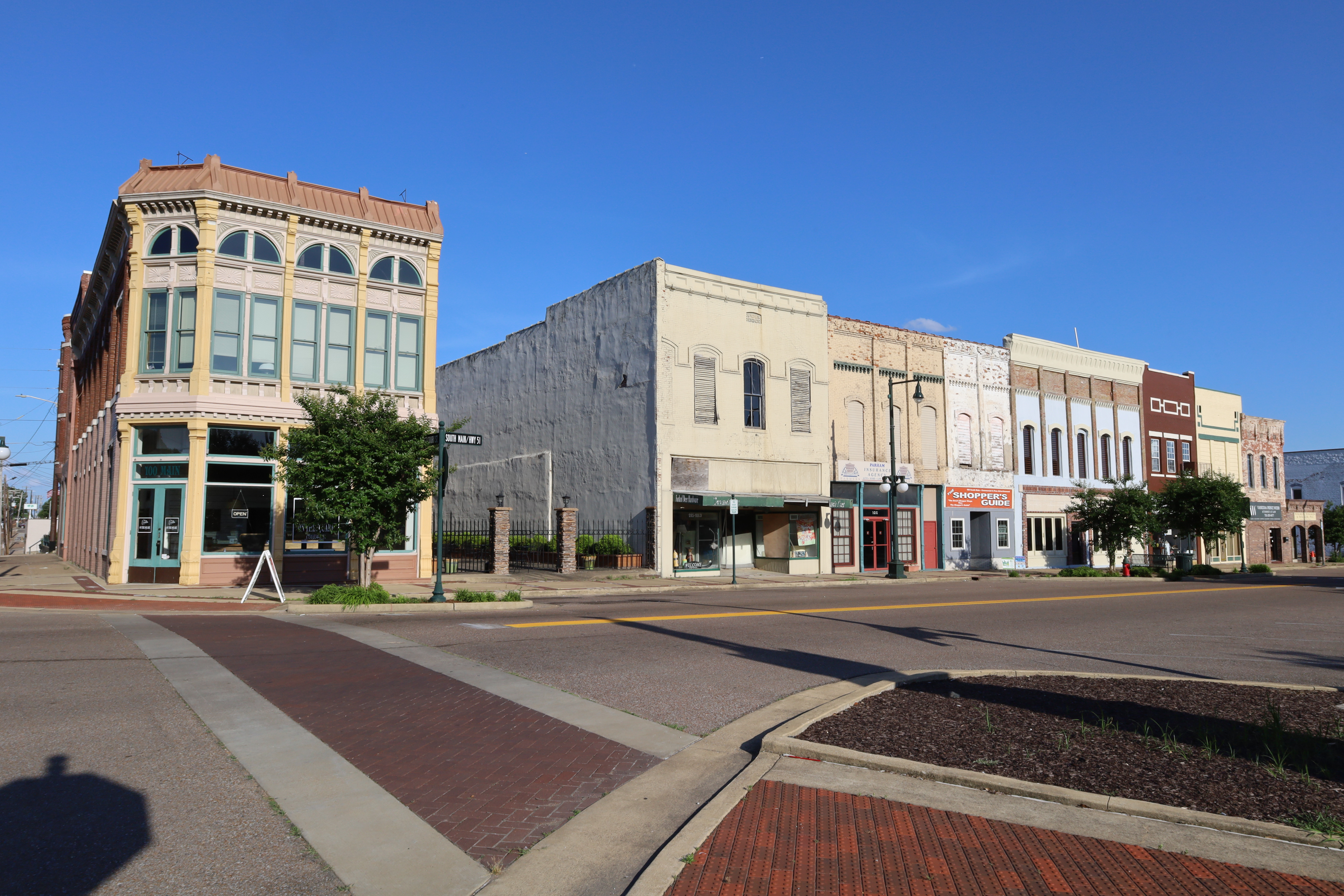
Buildings across from the Dyer County Courthouse in 2022

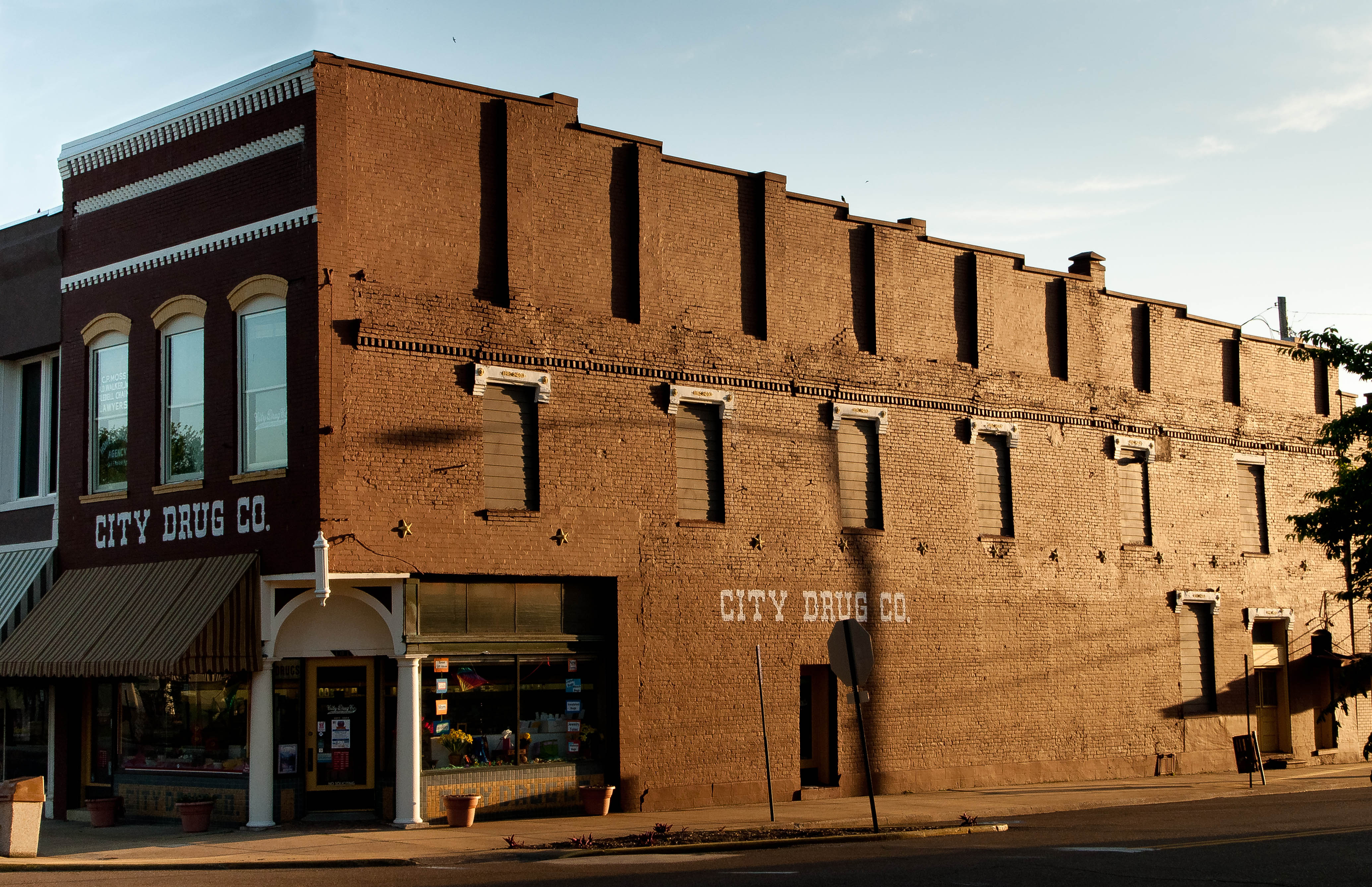
Example of downtown Dyersburg architecture

On September 17, 2003, Harold Kilpatrick Jr. took 15 hostages in a classroom at Dyersburg State Community College. Kilpatrick was killed following a nine-hour standoff with police.

In June and July 2020, multiple peaceful demonstrations were held in downtown Dyersburg around the city's Confederate Statue. These protests focused on systemic racism and police brutality. At one of the protests a speech was given about Lation Scott, a man who was brutally lynched in front of a crowd of thousands in the same court square over a hundred years prior. These events are notable as they are the first known protests to have occurred in the town. During one protest, participants were met by a group of counter-protesters concerned about the removal of Dyersburg's Confederate Statue, with some claiming the statue commemorates all Confederate soldiers in Tennessee including black ones, and claiming "Black men joined because of deprivations, like burning, raping and looting, committed by the Union". Another said Black Lives Matter was becoming "like a terrorist group." Rebuking the counter-protestors, A Dyersburg resident said, “We’re not here about the statue. We’re here to get justice for our brothers and sisters. That statue didn't kill George Floyd. That statue didn't kill Breonna Taylor.”

== Geography ==
Dyersburg is located in central Dyer County. According to the United States Census Bureau, the city has a total area of 17.5 square miles (45.2 km^{2}), of which 17.3 square miles (44.9 km^{2}) is land and 0.1 square miles (0.3 km^{2}), or 0.66%, is water.

Dyersburg is located on the Forked Deer River and is 13 mi (21 km) from the Mississippi River.

The city's proximity to the New Madrid Seismic Zone places it at risk for future earthquakes. USGS data shows an 18.28% chance of a major earthquake within 31 miles (50 km) of Dyersburg within the next 50 years. The largest earthquake within 30 miles (48 km) of Dyersburg was a 4.0-magnitude event in 2005.

=== Climate ===
Climate data for Dyersburg Regional Airport, Tennessee (1991–2020 normals, extremes 1948–present)
Month	Jan	Feb	Mar	Apr	May	Jun	Jul	Aug	Sep	Oct	Nov	Dec	Year
Record high °F (°C)	78 (26)	80 (27)	85 (29)	93 (34)	97 (36)	105 (41)	104 (40)	104 (40)	103 (39)	93 (34)	84 (29)	78 (26)	105 (41)
Mean daily maximum °F (°C)	47.3 (8.5)	51.7 (10.9)	61.1 (16.2)	71.0 (21.7)	79.7 (26.5)	87.6 (30.9)	90.1 (32.3)	89.5 (31.9)	83.7 (28.7)	73.0 (22.8)	59.5 (15.3)	50.4 (10.2)	70.4 (21.3)
Daily mean °F (°C)	38.3 (3.5)	41.8 (5.4)	50.6 (10.3)	60.0 (15.6)	69.6 (20.9)	77.6 (25.3)	80.4 (26.9)	79.0 (26.1)	72.5 (22.5)	60.9 (16.1)	48.9 (9.4)	41.5 (5.3)	60.1 (15.6)
Mean daily minimum °F (°C)	29.2 (−1.6)	31.8 (−0.1)	40.2 (4.6)	49.0 (9.4)	59.5 (15.3)	67.7 (19.8)	70.7 (21.5)	68.5 (20.3)	61.3 (16.3)	48.8 (9.3)	38.3 (3.5)	32.6 (0.3)	49.8 (9.9)
Record low °F (°C)	−12 (−24)	−5 (−21)	6 (−14)	25 (−4)	38 (3)	46 (8)	55 (13)	49 (9)	37 (3)	25 (−4)	6 (−14)	−7 (−22)	−12 (−24)
Average precipitation inches (mm)	3.80 (97)	4.56 (116)	5.87 (149)	5.08 (129)	5.38 (137)	4.47 (114)	4.29 (109)	3.27 (83)	2.64 (67)	4.16 (106)	4.54 (115)	5.19 (132)	53.25 (1,353)
Average precipitation days (≥ 0.01 in)	9.3	7.8	11.3	9.9	10.4	8.4	7.2	5.7	6.7	7.8	8.5	9.4	102.4
Source: NOAA

== Demographics ==
Historical population
Census	Pop.	Note	%±
1870	683		—
1880	1,010		47.9%
1890	2,009		98.9%
1900	3,647		81.5%
1910	4,149		13.8%
1920	6,444		55.3%
1930	8,733		35.5%
1940	10,034		14.9%
1950	10,885		8.5%
1960	12,499		14.8%
1970	14,523		16.2%
1980	15,856		9.2%
1990	16,317		2.9%
2000	17,452		7.0%
2010	17,145		−1.8%
2020	16,164		−5.7%

=== 2020 census ===
As of the 2020 census, Dyersburg had a population of 16,164, 6,599 households, and 4,500 families residing in the city.

The median age was 38.2 years. 24.8% of residents were under the age of 18 and 18.1% of residents were 65 years of age or older. For every 100 females there were 88.3 males, and for every 100 females age 18 and over there were 82.2 males age 18 and over.

98.1% of residents lived in urban areas, while 1.9% lived in rural areas.

There were 6,599 households in Dyersburg, of which 32.4% had children under the age of 18 living in them. Of all households, 33.9% were married-couple households, 19.4% were households with a male householder and no spouse or partner present, and 38.3% were households with a female householder and no spouse or partner present. About 32.3% of all households were made up of individuals and 13.9% had someone living alone who was 65 years of age or older.

There were 7,364 housing units, of which 10.4% were vacant. The homeowner vacancy rate was 1.9% and the rental vacancy rate was 8.4%.

Racial composition as of the 2020 census
Race	Number	Percent
White	10,284	63.6%
Black or African American	4,355	26.9%
American Indian and Alaska Native	23	0.1%
Asian	171	1.1%
Native Hawaiian and Other Pacific Islander	7	0.0%
Some other race	416	2.6%
Two or more races	908	5.6%
Hispanic or Latino (of any race)	725	4.5%

=== 2000 census ===
Dyersburg's population was estimated at 17,002 in 2013. As of the census of 2000, there was a population of 17,452, with 7,036 households and 4,517 families residing in the city. The population density was 1,158.7 inhabitants per square mile (447.4/km^{2}). There were 7,885 housing units at an average density of 523.5 per square mile (202.1/km^{2}). The racial makeup of the city was 75.68% White, 22.02% African American, 0.21% Native American, 0.54% Asian, 0.02% Pacific Islander, 0.53% from other races, and 0.99% from two or more races. Hispanic or Latino of any race were 1.36% of the population.

There were 7,036 households, out of which 31.5% had children under the age of 18 living with them, 42.4% were married couples living together, 17.9% had a female householder with no husband present, and 35.8% were non-families. 30.9% of all households were made up of individuals, and 13.1% had someone living alone who was 65 years of age or older. The average household size was 2.39 and the average family size was 2.99.

In the city, the population was spread out, with 26.3% under the age of 18, 9.6% from 18 to 24, 27.6% from 25 to 44, 21.4% from 45 to 64, and 15.0% who were 65 years of age or older. The median age was 36 years. For every 100 females, there were 86.5 males. For every 100 females age 18 and over, there were 82.3 males. In 2013 there were 7,989 males and 9,013 Females. The median age: 37.6.

The median income for a household in the city was $28,232, and the median income for a family was $34,754. Males had a median income of $30,898 versus $21,337 for females. The per capita income for the city was $16,388. About 17.4% of families and 20.5% of the population were below the poverty line, including 29.5% of those under age 18 and 19.0% of those age 65 or over.

== Sports ==
From 1923 to 1925, Dyersburg was home to a Minor League Baseball team known as the Dyersburg Forked Deers (1923–1924) and Dyersburg Deers (1925). They won the Kentucky–Illinois–Tennessee League championship in 1923 and 1924.

On March 9, 2024, the Dyersburg High School Girls Basketball Team (The Lady Trojans) won their first State Championship in Class 3A by beating Upperman High School 41-39. The tournament was played at Middle Tennessee State's Murphy Center in Murfreesboro, Tennessee.

On March 14, 2026, the Dyersburg High School Girls Basketball Team (The Lady Trojans) won their second Class 3A State Title with a 54-45 win over White County.

== Parks and recreation ==
Dyersburg has several public parks, recreational centers, and swimming pools.

== Education ==
- Dyersburg State Community College – established 1969, with satellite campuses in Henry and Tipton counties.

The majority of Dyersburg is in the Dyersburg City School District though some outerlying portions are in the Dyer County School District. The zoned high school of the county school district is Dyer County High School in Newbern.

== Media ==
=== Newspaper ===
The Dyersburg State Gazette is a semi-weekly broadsheet newspaper published in Dyersburg. The newspaper has had a circulation reaching 7,900.

== Infrastructure ==
=== Transportation ===
- Dyersburg Regional Airport, KDYR, DYR by the FAA - 275 Acres
- Newbern–Dyersburg station, serves the City of New Orleans route, one of two Amtrak stations in Tennessee.

=== Hospital ===
West Tennessee Healthcare Dyersburg Hospital is a Joint Commission accredited hospital. The medical center has 225 beds. Originally built as Parkview Hospital in 1956, the hospital has changed stewardship multiple times since its inception.

== Notable people ==
- John Calvin Fiser (1838-1876), was an American merchant and soldier (Colonel)
- Harry Ford (actor) (1987–present), actor, starred in CBS show Code Black
- James A. Gardner (first lieutenant), recipient of the Medal of Honor, 1966.
- John Allen Greer (1874–1941), politician
- George "Two Ton" Harris (1927–2002) (wrestler), known as "Baby Blimp", professional wrestler, National Wrestling Alliance
- John D. Hunter (1968–2012), neurobiologist and the original author of Matplotlib.
- Emmett Kelly, Jr. (1923–2006), "The World's Most Famous Clown" better known as "Weary Willie"
- Michael Swift (1974–present), former National Football League player. Played for San Diego Chargers, Carolina Panthers, and Jacksonville Jaguars from 1997 to 2000
- Henderson Edward Wright (1919–1995), former Major League Baseball pitcher, played for the Boston Braves from 1945–48, and for the Philadelphia Athletics and 1952
