= Everett Woods =

American architect

Everett Dedman Woods was an architect based in Memphis, Tennessee. He was the younger brother of fellow architect Neander Woods Jr. The Coca-Cola bottling plant he designed in Covington, Tennessee is listed on the National Register of Historic Places and a residence he built in Memphis became corporate headquarters for Harrah's Entertainment. He also designed East High School in Memphis.

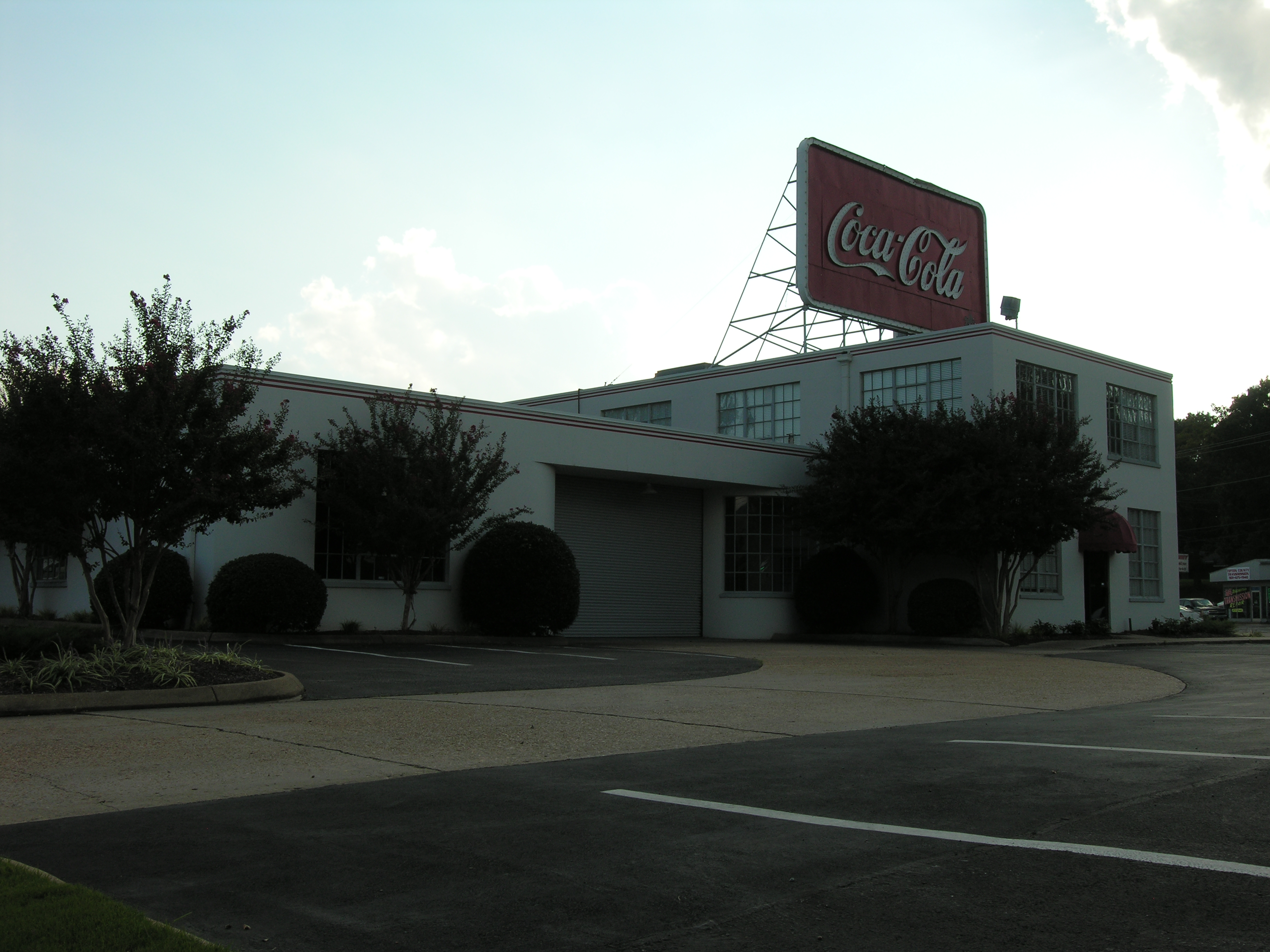
Coca-Cola Bottling Plant in Covington, Tennessee

He worked with George Mahan Jr. designing residences for many prominent citizens before establishing his own firm in 1930.

One of his designs, Poplar Plaza, was the first shopping center in Memphis and, according to a planning official in Memphis, the first shopping center in the United States designed for the automobile. John B. Goodwin was the developer. East High School was the largest and finest school in Memphis history when it was built and was the city's first integrated high school.

== Work ==
- Scates Hall at the University of Memphis (1921) chief architect
- Coca-Cola Bottling Plant, 126 US 51, S Covington, TN Woods, Everett NRHP listed
- Everett Cook House which became Harrah's Entertainment Corporate Headquarters and then Wright Medical's headquarters (1938), 1023 Cherry Rd.

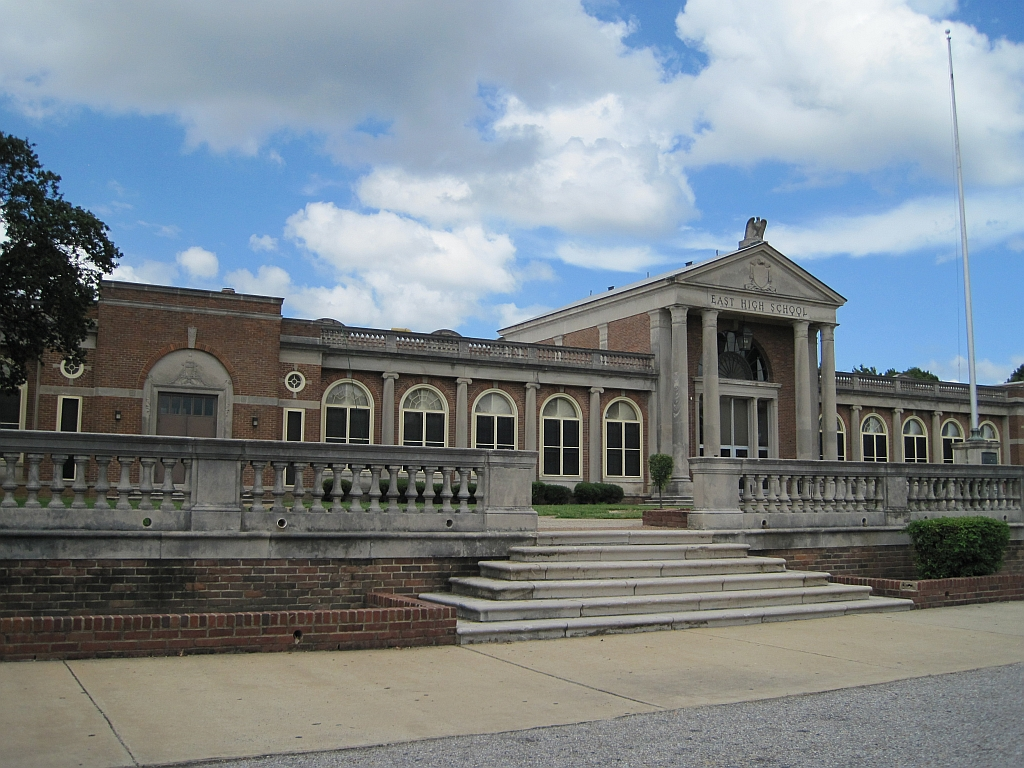
East High School

- East High School (1946) 3206 Poplar Avenue
- West Tennessee Tuberculosis Hospital (1948) in association with another architectural firm
- Poplar Plaza (1949) at Poplar and Highland, Memphis an early example of a shopping center
- Brooks Art Museum wing (1950) since demolished
- Commercial block on Madison along with a planned but never built apartment building
