= Tennessee House of Representatives 77th district =

State legislative district in Tennessee

Tennessee's 77th State House of Representatives district
- Map of Tennessee House districts with the 77th District shaded in red
Representative
Rusty Grills; R–Newbern
since 2019
- Demographics: 75.6% White; 15.3% Black; 4.3% Hispanic; 0.5% Asian; 4.1% Multiracial
- Population (2024): 64,924

The Tennessee House of Representatives 77th district is one of the 99 legislative districts in the lower house of the Tennessee General Assembly. The district is located in West Tennessee and covers all of Dyer and Grundy counties and part of Obion. The main cities in the area are Dyersburg, Union City, and Tiptonville. Rusty Grills has represented the district since 2019.

== Demographics ==
The Tennessee Comptroller estimates the population as of 2024 at 64,924.

- 75.6% of the district is White
- 15.3% of the district is African American
- 4.3% of the district is Hispanic
- 0.5% of the district is Asian
- 4.1% of the district is Two or more races

Detailed demographic information is also available through Census Reporter.

== History ==
The 88th Tennessee General Assembly was the first in which all districts were numbered. At this time, the 77th district was in Gibson, Lake, Obion and Weakley counties. During the 89th GA, the district also included Henry County instead of Gibson County. During the 90th to 92nd GAs it was made up of Gibson, Obion, and Weakley counties. During the 93rd, Lake County was included again. From the 94th to 98th GAs, it was Lake, Obion, and Weakley counties. From the 99th-102nd it was made up of Lake, Obion, and part of Gibson counties. From the 103rd to 107th it was made up of Lake, Obion, and part of Dyer counties. It has been made up of all of Lake, Dyer, and part of Obion counties since the 113th General Assembly.

== List of Representatives ==
Representative	Party	Years of Service	General Assembly	Hometown
Rusty Grills	Republican	2019 - present	111th-114th	Newbern
Bill Sanderson	Republican	2011 - 2018	107th-110th	Kenton
Judy Barker	Democratic	2009 - 2010	106th	Union City
Phillip Pinion	Democratic	1989 - 2008	96th-105th	Union City
John Tanner	Democratic	1977 - 1988	90th-95rd	Union City
Larry Bates	Democratic	1971 - 1976	87th-89th	Martin
