= Rusty Grills =

American politician (born 1981)

Russell Jackson "Rusty" Grills

Member of the Tennessee House of Representatives from the 77th district
- Incumbent
- Assumed office January 14, 2020
- Preceded by: Casey Hood (interim); Bill Sanderson

Personal details
- Born: October 1, 1981 (age 45) Newbern, Tennessee, U.S.
- Party: Republican
- Spouse: Christina Marie "Christi" (née Bennett Grills)
- Children: 2
- Education: Homeschooled
- Website: Official website Campaign website

Russell Jackson "Rusty" Grills (born October 1, 1981) is an American politician from the state of Tennessee. A Republican, Grills has represented the 77th district of the Tennessee House of Representatives, covering Dyer, Lake, and Obion Counties along the Mississippi River, since 2020.

== Career ==
In July 2019, Republican Bill Sanderson resigned from the 77th district of the Tennessee House of Representatives, and fellow Republican Casey Hood was appointed to the seat. Grills, then a farmer and a Dyer County Commissioner, announced he would run against Hood in the November special primary election for the remainder of Sanderson's term. In a four-candidate race, Grills convincingly ousted Hood with 56% of the vote, and went on to easily win the December general election over Democrat Michael Smith and three independents. Grills assumed office on January 14, 2020.

Grills served on conservative grassroots advisory council advocating for Tennessee Governor Bill Lee.

In 2023, Grills supported a resolution to expel three Democratic lawmakers from the legislature for violating decorum rules. The expulsion was widely characterized as unprecedented.

== Personal life ==
Grills lives in Newbern with his wife, Christina "Christi" Marie née Bennett Grills (a registered nurse), and their two children. Grills was homeschooled.
