= T. J. Frier =

American football player (born 1977)

No. 91, 96
- Position: Defensive tackle

Personal information
- Born: August 17, 1977 (age 49); Grand Forks, North Dakota, U.S.
- Listed height: 6 ft 2 in (1.88 m)
- Listed weight: 307 lb (139 kg)

Career information
- High school: Dyer County (Newbern, Tennessee)
- College: Memphis (1995–1998)
- NFL draft: 1999: undrafted

Career history
- Seattle Seahawks (1999–2000)*; → Berlin Thunder (2000); Memphis Maniax (2001); Los Angeles Avengers (2001)
- * Offseason or practice squad member only
- Stats at ArenaFan.com

T. J. Frier (born August 17, 1977) is an American former professional football defensive tackle who for the Los Angeles Avengers of the Arena Football League (AFL), the Memphis Maniax of the XFL, and the Berlin Thunder of NFL Europe. He played college football at the University of Memphis. He was also a member of the Seattle Seahawks of the National Football League (NFL).

== Early life and college ==
T. J. Frier was born on August 17, 1977, in Grand Forks, North Dakota. He attended Dyer County High School in Newbern, Tennessee.

Frier was a four-year letterman for the Memphis Tigers of the University of Memphis from 1995 to 1998.

== Professional career ==
After going undrafted in the 1999 NFL draft, Frier signed with the Seattle Seahawks on April 22, 1999. He was waived in September 1999 before the start of the season. He re-signed with the Seahawks in February 2000, and was allocated to NFL Europe to play for the Berlin Thunder. Frier played in all ten games for the Thunder during the 2000 NFL Europe season, recording 20 tackles, three sacks, and one pass breakup. He was released by the Seahawks on August 27, 2000.

Frier played in eight games, starting three, for the Memphis Maniax of the XFL in 2001, posting five tackles.

Frier was signed by the Los Angeles Avengers of the Arena Football League (AFL) on April 11, 2001. He appeared in seven games for the Avengers, totaling two solo tackles, one assisted tackle, and one fumble recovery. He was an offensive lineman/defensive lineman during his time in the AFL as the league played under ironman rules. He was released by the Avengers on November 2, 2001.

== Personal life ==
Frier's brother Damon played collegiately for the Wyoming Cowboys.
