= Big Boy Junction, Tennessee =

Big Boy Junction
- Unincorporated community
- Location within Tennessee Location within the United States
- Coordinates: 36°02′11″N 89°30′01″W
- Country: United States
- State: Tennessee
- County: Dyer
- Elevation: 269 ft (82 m)
- Time zone: UTC-6 (Central (CST))
  - Summer (DST): UTC-5 (CDT)
- GNIS feature ID: 1277235

Big Boy Junction is an unincorporated community in Dyer County, Tennessee, United States.

Flooding from the Mississippi River, located 10 mi (16 km) west of Big Boy Junction, occasionally reaches the settlement. One flood was so large that "sizable boats" were able to dock at Big Boy Junction.

A Tennessee Farmers Cooperative store is located in Big Boy Junction.
