= Fowlkes, Tennessee =

- Unincorporated community
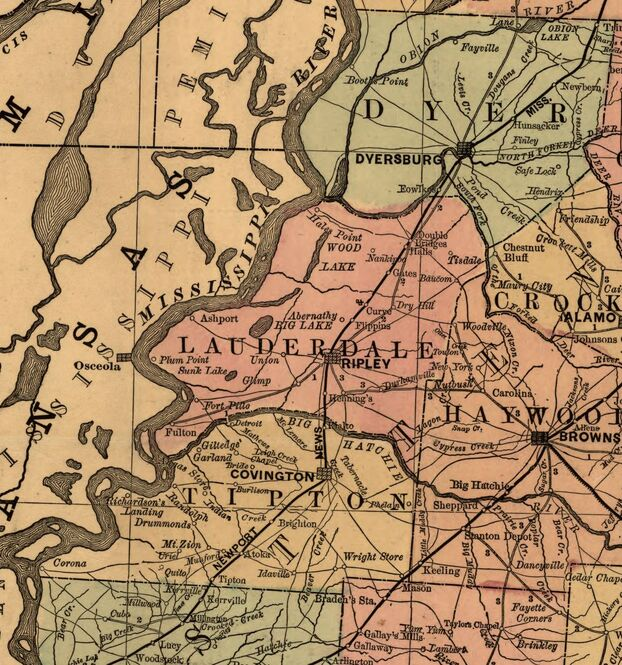
- Map of Lauderdale County, showing Fowlkes in southern Dyer County

- Location within Tennessee Location within the United States
- Coordinates: 35°58′14″N 89°23′10″W
- Country: United States
- State: Tennessee
- County: Dyer
- Founded: 1882

Area
  - Total: 2.09 sq mi (5.42 km^{2})
  - Land: 2.09 sq mi (5.42 km^{2})
  - Water: 0 sq mi (0.00 km^{2})
- Elevation: 341 ft (104 m)

Population (2020)
  - Total: 882
  - Density: 421.5/sq mi (162.73/km^{2})
- Time zone: UTC-6 (Central (CST))
  - Summer (DST): UTC-5 (CDT)
- ZIP code: 38024
- Area code: 731
- GNIS feature ID: 1284753

Fowlkes is an unincorporated community in Dyer County, Tennessee, United States.

== History ==
Originally founded as Fowlkes Station in 1882 by W.P. Fowlkes, the following year the Newport News & Mississippi Valley Railroad was completed in Dyer County. The line for this railroad passed through the community of Fowlkes. By 1887, the community supported a school, a Methodist church, and multiple grist mills and cotton gins.

== Demographics ==
Historical population
| Census | Pop. | Note | %± |
|---|---|---|---|
| 2020 | 882 | | — |
U.S. Decennial Census

== Education ==
The school district is the Dyer County School District. The zoned high school is Dyer County High School in Newbern.
