= Lenox, Tennessee =

Lenox, Tennessee Coon Creek
- Unincorporated community
- Location within Tennessee Location within the United States
- Coordinates: 36°05′21″N 89°29′54″W
- Country: United States
- State: Tennessee
- County: Dyer

Area
  - Total: 2.52 sq mi (6.53 km^{2})
  - Land: 2.52 sq mi (6.53 km^{2})
  - Water: 0 sq mi (0.00 km^{2})
- Elevation: 292 ft (89 m)

Population (2020)
  - Total: 308
  - Density: 122.2/sq mi (47.18/km^{2})
- Time zone: UTC-6 (Central (CST))
  - Summer (DST): UTC-5 (CDT)
- ZIP code: 38047
- Area code: 731
- GNIS feature ID: 1291021

Lenox is an unincorporated community in Dyer County, Tennessee, United States. Its ZIP code is 38047.

== History ==
In 1887, the community, then known as Coon Creek, hosted a Union Baptist Church. A post office was established in 1888, with Giles James serving as the first postmaster. In 1904, the Dyersburg Northern Railroad was chartered to connect Dyersburg to Tiptonville in Lake County. The line was constructed on the western edge of the community.

== Education ==
The school district is the Dyer County School District. The zoned high school is Dyer County High School in Newbern.
