= Dyer County High School =

Dyer County High school

Location
- 1000 West Main; Newbern, Dyer County, Tennessee; 38059-1473; United States; 36.103165°N 89.29179°W

Information
- Type: Public
- Established: 1972; 54 years ago
- School district: Dyer County Schools
- NCES School ID: 470105002028
- Principal: Stephanie Sanders
- Staff: 69.98 (FTE)
- Grades: 9-12
- Enrollment: 1,070 (2022–2023)
- Student to teacher ratio: 15.29
- Hours in school day: 7
- Campus type: Rural
- Colors: Orange and white
- Athletics conference: TSSAA
- Mascot: Choctaw
- Rival: Dyersburg High School
- Feeder schools: Northview Middle School; Three Oaks Middle School
- Website: dchs.dyercs.net

Dyer County High School is a public Title I high school located in Newbern, Tennessee. It is an operated by the Dyer County Schools system.

The school district (of which this is the sole comprehensive high school) includes a few outerlying parts of Dyersburg as well as the town of Newbern and the Dyer County portion of Trimble. It also includes the census-designated places of Bogota, Finley, Fowlkes, Lenox, and Miston.

The school features its own botanical gardens located on the campus. Also, the company AltarNoire was founded by Barrett Rainey, an actively enrolled student at the time. The school is home to the 2011–12, 2012–13, 2013–14, and 2014–15 TSSAA State Cheerleading Champions as well as the 2012–13, 2013–14, and 2014–15 UCA National High School Cheerleading Co-ed Champions.

== Notable alumni ==
Notable people to have attended the school include:

- T. J. Frier, American football defensive tackle
- Robert Hubbs III, semi professional basketball player
- Connor Ray Edwards, singer/songwriter
