= Trimble, Tennessee =

- Town
- Location of Trimble in Dyer County, Tennessee.
- Coordinates: 36°12′8″N 89°11′20″W
- Country: United States
- State: Tennessee
- Counties: Dyer, Obion
- First Settled: 1873
- Incorporated: 1905
- Named for: Robert Trimble

Government
  - Mayor: Jonathan E. McFarland

Area
  - Total: 0.64 sq mi (1.67 km^{2})
  - Land: 0.64 sq mi (1.67 km^{2})
  - Water: 0 sq mi (0.00 km^{2})
- Elevation: 299 ft (91 m)

Population (2020)
  - Total: 547
  - Density: 846.2/sq mi (326.71/km^{2})
- Time zone: UTC-6 (Central (CST))
  - Summer (DST): UTC-5 (CDT)
- ZIP code: 38259
- Area code: 731
- FIPS code: 47-75160
- GNIS feature ID: 1304164
- Website: www.trimbletennessee.com

Trimble is a town in Dyer and Obion counties in the U.S. state of Tennessee. As of the 2020 census, Trimble had a population of 547.

The Dyer County portion of Trimble is part of the Dyersburg, TN Micropolitan Statistical Area, while the Obion County portion is part of the Union City, TN–KY Micropolitan Statistical Area.

== History ==
The town was first settled in 1873 on land owned by local Jesse Pierce. By the end of the year, a saloon was in operation, operated by Gammons & Fowlkes. The following year, the town was named Trimble Station, when the Paducah & Memphis Railroad extended its line from Troy Station, TN south to the Dyer County line. Construction of this extension was completed on May 15, 1874. The line was not extended south to Dyersburg until June of 1882 by the Chesapeake, Ohio, & Southwestern Railroad, a predecessor of the Newport News & Mississippi Valley Railroad and the Illinois Central Railroad.

In 1884, a school named Trimble Academy was chartered in the town.

In 2014, the Full Throttle Distillery was opened in Trimble, on the site of the former Trimble Cotton Gin. The distillery is owned by Michael Ballard, who also owns the Full Throttle Saloon in Sturgis, South Dakota.

== Geography ==
According to the United States Census Bureau, the town has a total area of 0.6 square mile (1.7 km^{2}), all land.

== Demographics ==
Historical population
Census	Pop.	Note	%±
1890	428		—
1910	556		—
1920	781		40.5%
1930	723		−7.4%
1940	763		5.5%
1950	674		−11.7%
1960	581		−13.8%
1970	675		16.2%
1980	722		7.0%
1990	694		−3.9%
2000	728		4.9%
2010	637		−12.5%
2020	547		−14.1%

As of the census of 2000, there were 728 people, 307 households, and 209 families residing in the town. The population density was 1,140.9 inhabitants per square mile (440.5/km^{2}). There were 329 housing units at an average density of 515.6 per square mile (199.1/km^{2}). The racial makeup of the town was 98.21% White, 0.69% African American, 0.41% from other races, and 0.69% from two or more races. Hispanic or Latino of any race were 0.96% of the population.

There were 307 households, out of which 28.7% had children under the age of 18 living with them, 54.1% were married couples living together, 8.8% had a female householder with no husband present, and 31.9% were non-families. 28.0% of all households were made up of individuals, and 14.7% had someone living alone who was 65 years of age or older. The average household size was 2.37 and the average family size was 2.89.

In the town, the population was spread out, with 22.9% under the age of 18, 9.5% from 18 to 24, 26.4% from 25 to 44, 25.0% from 45 to 64, and 16.2% who were 65 years of age or older. The median age was 40 years. For every 100 females, there were 93.1 males. For every 100 females age 18 and over, there were 90.2 males.

The median income for a household in the town was $33,000, and the median income for a family was $38,750. Males had a median income of $35,208 versus $19,125 for females. The per capita income for the town was $15,991. About 7.2% of families and 11.4% of the population were below the poverty line, including 7.4% of those under age 18 and 22.1% of those age 65 or over.

== Parks and recreation ==
The town features a gazebo and covered bridge that is often used for weddings.

== Education ==
The portion in Dyer County is in the Dyer County School District.

- Trimble Elementary School
- The zoned high school is Dyer County High School in Newbern.

The portion in Obion County is in the Obion County Schools.
