= Midway, Dyer County, Tennessee =

Midway
- Unincorporated community
- Location within Tennessee Location within the United States
- Coordinates: 36°00′21″N 89°41′21″W
- Country: United States
- State: Tennessee
- County: Dyer
- Elevation: 262 ft (80 m)
- Time zone: UTC-6 (Central (CST))
  - Summer (DST): UTC-5 (CDT)
- Area code: 731
- GNIS feature ID: 1315501

Midway is an unincorporated community in Dyer County, Tennessee. Midway is located near the Mississippi River 17.1 miles (27.5 km) west of Dyersburg.
