= Nauvoo, Tennessee =

- Unincorporated community
- Location within Tennessee Location within the United States
- Coordinates: 36°05′37″N 89°24′51″W
- Country: United States
- State: Tennessee
- County: Dyer
- Elevation: 351 ft (107 m)
- Time zone: UTC-6 (Central (CST))
  - Summer (DST): UTC-5 (CDT)
- Area code: 731
- GNIS feature ID: 1295263

Nauvoo is an unincorporated community in Dyer County, Tennessee, United States.
