= William Flatt =

American animal and nutritional scientist (1931–2026)

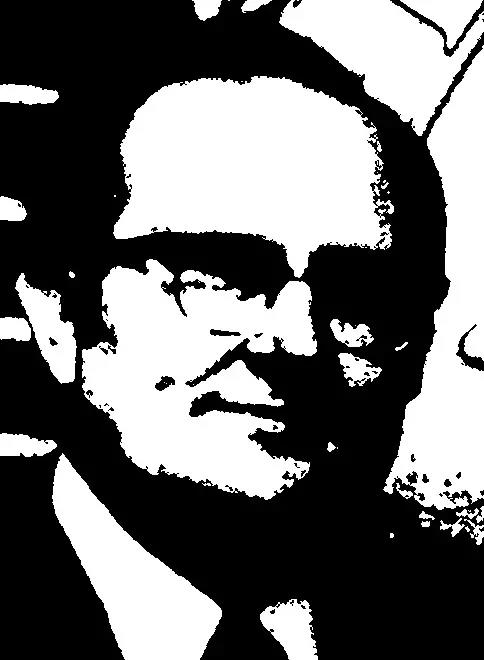
- Flatt in 1975
- Born: William Perry Flatt; June 17, 1931; Newbern, Tennessee, U.S.
- Died: February 9, 2026 (aged 94); Athens, Georgia, U.S.
- Education: Bethel College; University of Tennessee; Cornell University
- Occupations: Animal and nutritional scientist
- Spouse(s): Sally June Nesbitt (m. 1949; died 2009) Marihope Troutman (m. 2014)

William Perry Flatt (June 17, 1931 – February 9, 2026) was an American animal and nutritional scientist.

== Early life and career ==
Flatt was born in Newbern, Tennessee, the son of Carl Flatt. He attended Trimble High School, graduating as a valedictorian in 1948. After graduating, he briefly attended Bethel College, before transferring to the University of Tennessee, earning his BS degree in animal science in 1952. He also attended Cornell University, earning his PhD degree in 1955, which after earning his degrees, he worked as a postdoctoral fellow in Aberdeen from 1967 to 1968.

Flatt served as a professor in the department of nutritional sciences at the University of Georgia from 1969 to 2020. During his years as a professor, in 1994, he was named the D.W. Brooks distinguished professor by the University System of Georgia. As a major donor to the University of Georgia, he established the named endowed chair Bill and June Flatt Professorship in Foods and Nutrition in 2024, named in honor of his deceased wife.

== Personal life and death ==
In 1949, Flatt married Sally June Nesbitt, a newspaper editor. Their marriage ended with her death in 2009. He then married Marihope Troutman in 2014.

Flatt died in Athens, Georgia, on February 9, 2026, at the age of 94.
