= RoEllen, Tennessee =

- Unincorporated community
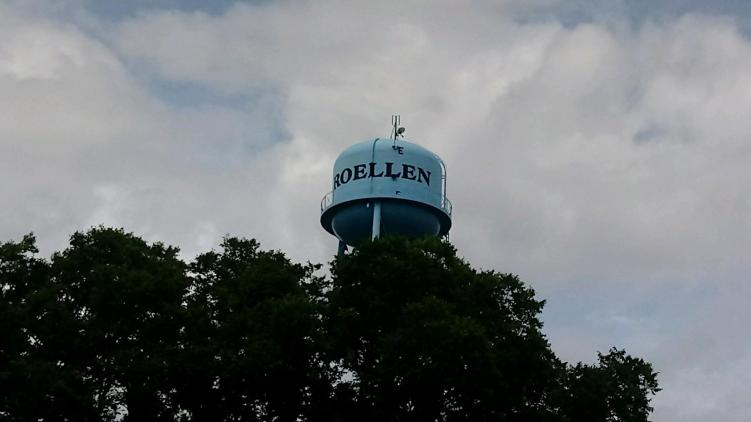
- RoEllen water tower

- Location within Tennessee Location within the United States
- Coordinates: 36°01′25″N 89°16′53″W
- Country: United States
- State: Tennessee
- County: Dyer
- Elevation: 299 ft (91 m)
- Time zone: UTC-6 (Central (CST))
  - Summer (DST): UTC-5 (CDT)
- Area code: 731
- GNIS feature ID: 1299543

RoEllen (also Roellen) is an unincorporated community in Dyer County, Tennessee, United States.

== History ==
RoEllen is the site of the first church erected in Dyer County in 1830. The wooden frame building, known as "Old Union" housed Baptist, Methodist, and Cumberland Presbyterian services. At an unknown later date, the Cumberland Presbyterians took over sole ownership of the building and property and erected a new building.

== Notable people ==
- Joe Bradshaw, baseball player, was born in RoEllen.
