= Joe Bradshaw (baseball) =

American baseball player (1897-1985)

- Pitcher
- Born: August 17, 1897; RoEllen, Tennessee
- Died: January 30, 1985 (aged 87); Tavares, Florida
- Batted: Right Threw: Right

MLB debut
- May 9, 1929, for the Brooklyn Robins

Last MLB appearance
- May 13, 1929, for the Brooklyn Robins

MLB statistics
- Win–loss record: 0–0
- Earned run average: 4.50
- Strikeouts: 1
- Stats at Baseball Reference

Teams
- Brooklyn Robins (1929)

Joseph Siah Bradshaw (August 17, 1897 – January 30, 1985) was a pitcher in Major League Baseball. He pitched in two games for the 1929 Brooklyn Robins, working four innings and allowing two earned runs.
