= Hawkinsville, Tennessee =

Coordinates: 35°54′30″N 89°17′02″W

- Unincorporated community
- Location within Tennessee Location within the United States
- Country: United States
- State: Tennessee
- County: Dyer
- Elevation: 377 ft (115 m)
- Time zone: UTC-6 (Central (CST))
  - Summer (DST): UTC-5 (CDT)
- Area code: 731
- GNIS feature ID: 1315206

Hawkinsville is an unincorporated community in Dyer County, Tennessee, United States.

== Information ==
Its elevation is 377 feet (115 m) and it is in the Central Time Zone (UTC-6).
