= Dyer County Schools =

Public school district for Dyer County, Tennessee

Location
- 159 Everett Avenue; Dyersburg, Tennessee United States
- Coordinates: 36.02938°N 89.361109°W

District information
- Type: Public school (government funded)
- Grades: PK-12
- Superintendent: Cheryl Mathis
- Schools: 5 Primary; 2 Middle; 1 High
- Budget: $29,404,000
- NCES District ID: 4701050

Students and staff
- Students: 3,643
- Teachers: 219.34 (on a full-time equivalent (FTE) basis)
- Student–teacher ratio: 16.61
- District mascot: Choctaw
- Colors: Orange and White

Other information
- Website: www.dyercs.net

Dyer County Schools is the public school district for Dyer County, Tennessee.

The district serves the entire county except for those served by the Dyersburg City Schools District. The district includes a few outerlying parts of Dyersburg as well as the town of Newbern and the Dyer County portion of Trimble. It also includes the census-designated places of Bogota, Finley, Fowlkes, Lenox, and Miston.

== History ==
Reportedly, the first school in Dyer County was started at Key Corner (now in Lauderdale County) in 1825 by Edith Kenley. The same year, Dr. Thomas Nash opened a school southeast of modern day Dyersburg. In 1884, Newbern and Trimble, Tennessee both had schools established.

== Schools ==
Elementary schools

- Fifth Consolidated School in Dyersburg 36.089953°N 89.382432°W serving grades PK-5 (NCES Id 470105000340)
- Finley Elementary School in Finley 36.034768°N 89.481486°W serving grades PK-5 (NCES Id 470105000341)
- Holice Powell Elementary School in Dyersburg 35.971468°N 89.388682°W serving grades PK-5 (NCES Id 470105000342)
- Newbern Grammar in Newbern 36.117302°N 89.260086°W serving grades PK-5 (NCES Id 470105000343)
- Trimble Elementary School in Trimble 36.200607°N 89.184512°W serving grades PK-5 (NCES Id 470105000345)

Middle schools

- Three Oaks Middle School in Dyersburg 36.049637°N 89.43517°W serving grades 6-8 (NCES Id 470105000934)
- Northview Middle School in Newbern 36.114503°N 89.284387°W serving grades 6-8 (NCES Id 470105000339)

High schools

- Dyer County High School in Newbern 36.103165°N 89.29179°W serving grades 9-12 (NCES Id 470105002028)
