= Tigrett, Tennessee =

- Unincorporated community
- Location within Tennessee Location within the United States
- Coordinates: 35°57′05″N 89°14′24″W
- Country: United States
- State: Tennessee
- County: Dyer
- Elevation: 289 ft (88 m)
- Time zone: UTC-6 (Central (CST))
  - Summer (DST): UTC-5 (CDT)
- ZIP code: 38070
- Area code: 731
- GNIS feature ID: 1272634

Tigrett is an unincorporated community in Dyer County, Tennessee, United States. Its ZIP code is 38070.
