= Robert Henry Dyer =

American militia officer (1774–1826)

- Born: c. 1774; North Carolina
- Died: May 11, 1826; Madison County, Tennessee

Robert Henry Dyer (c. 1774–May 11, 1826) was an American militia officer who served under command of Andrew Jackson in his campaigns of the 1810s. In correspondence, Jackson typically referred to him as Col. Henry Dyer. Dyer served in the Tennessee State Senate for the term 1815–1817. Dyer County, Tennessee is named in his honor.

== Biography ==
His parents were Sophia and Joel H. Dyer (d. 1825). Joel Dyer was a veteran of the American Revolutionary War. His birth year may have been around 1774. Robert Dyer was born in North Carolina, but the family moved to Tennessee before 1797 and he "was reared largely on Holston River, Grainger County." Biographical Dictionary of the Tennessee General Assembly reports "Extent of schooling not determined."

Dyer participated in the 1794 Nickajack expedition. He was appointed sergeant-at-arms at the second session of the Tennessee State Senate in 1798. Around 1807, he relocated to Rutherford County, Tennessee. The same year he was commissioned a lieutenant and then a captain in the 5th Brigade of the Tennessee state militia.

== Wars with Andrew Jackson ==
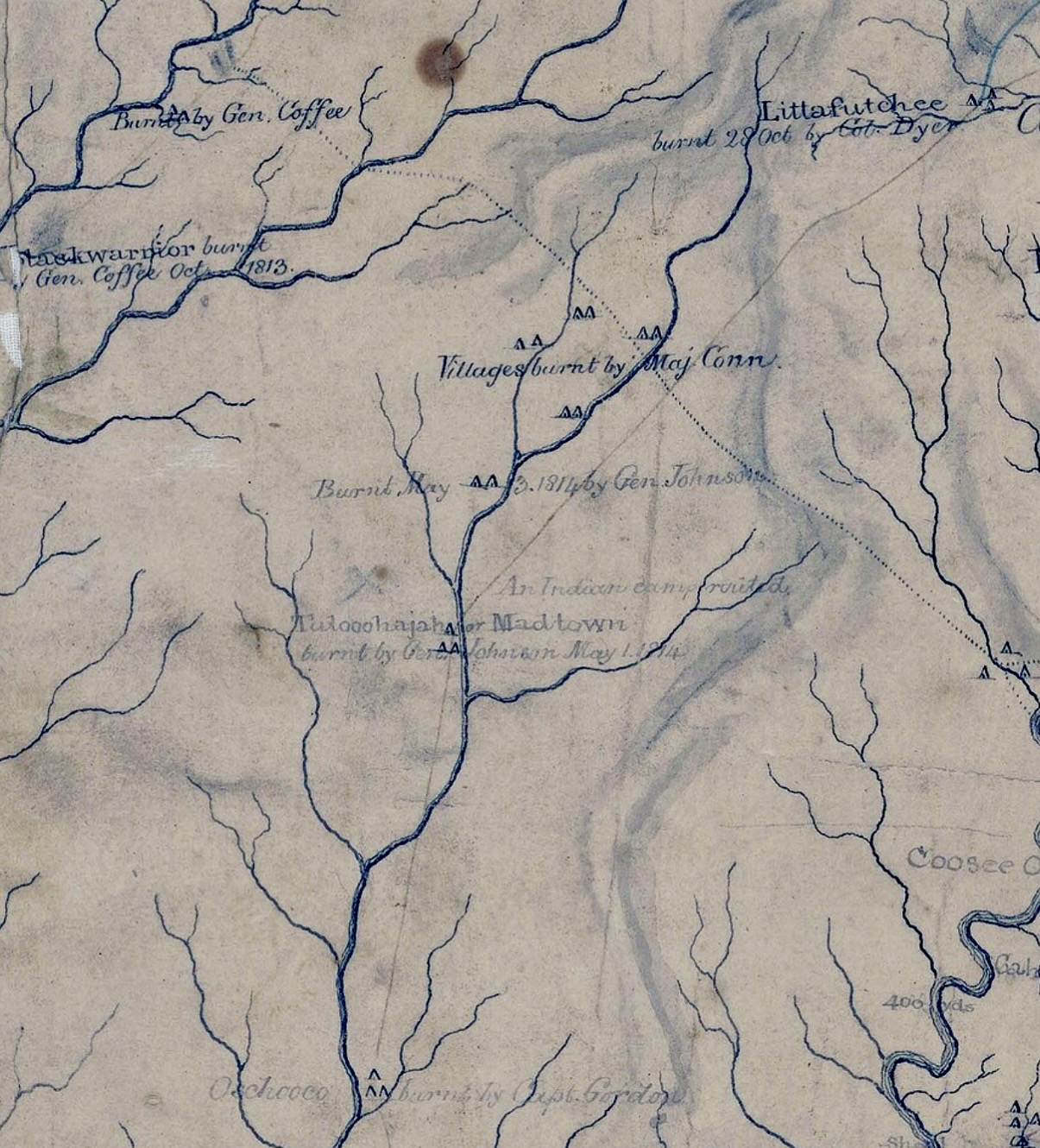
Detail of General Jackson's campaign against the Creek Indians 1813 & 1814, showing villages burned by General Johnson, Major Conn, and Colonel Dyer

Dyer participated in the Natchez expedition, Creek War, Battle of New Orleans, and First Seminole War. He was ranked a colonel of the 1st Regiment of Tennessee Volunteer Cavalry or Mounted Gunmen.

Lacking for logistical foresight, Andrew Jackson was down to two days of cornmeal for his troops by the end of October 1813, so he sent Dyer with 200 troops to sack the tribal town of Littafuchee in the vicinity of the Coosa River. Dyer burned the village and returned with 30 prisoners, and "reported finding a considered quantity of corn and 'beeves' in the neighboring fields, but inexplicably failed to bring any of it back to camp." Jackson put Dyer in command of his 250-strong reserve at the Battle of Talladega in November 1813. Jackson called up Dyer's horse-mounted forces to fill a gap in the line, which rallied the anxious infantrymen already fighting.

In February 1814, Jackson ordered Dyer (or, in his absence, a backup officer) to forage for supplies along the Coosa and Cahaba Rivers, and in March he was ordered to scout in the vicinity of Ditto's Landing.

Dyer was injured in Jackson's action against the British of December 23, 1814, ahead of what would become the Battle of New Orleans, when he "mistakenly strayed into the British lines" Dyer's leg was wounded "as his horse fell dead beneath him."

== Westward ==
Dyer represented Rutherford and Bedford counties in the Tennessee Senate from 1815 to 1817. In 1821 he participated in some way at the "first court" held in Madison County, Tennessee. In 1824 or 1825 Dyer was defeated in an election for major general of Tennessee militia.

In April 1825, Dyer served on a "navigation of western waters committee" representing Forked Deer River, along with Moses Woodfin and Adam Huntsman, but "further activities on the part of the board, if any, have not been disclosed by research." He was defeated in election for register of lands in the western district by "Alexander Nelson, of Dandridge, East Tennessee." In December of the same year, the "Tennessee legislature authorized a loan to Colonel Robert H. Dyer of $3,000 to dig a canal to connect the Forked Deer and the Mississippi at Dyer's Warehouse. A survey had been made by Henry Rutherford which disclosed a fall of nine feet above the low-water mark of the Mississippi, and that navigation would be shortened by more than 25 miles. As Colonel Dyer died in May, 1826, it is not likely that he had completed the enterprise."

He died in Madison County, Tennessee. He was buried in an unmarked grave in the north section of that county.

== Legacy ==
Dyer County, Tennessee is named in his honor, perhaps in part because "his father had old grants in its bounds."

He had a son named Joel Henry Dyer; rancher Mary Ann Goodnight was his granddaughter.

== Sources ==
- Jackson, Andrew (1991). Moser, Harold; Hoth, David; Macpherson, Sharon; Reinbold, John (eds.). The Papers of Andrew Jackson, Volume III, 1814–1815. University of Tennessee Press. doi:10.7290/utp9085. ISBN 978-0-87049-650-9.
- Kanon, Tom (2014). Tennesseans at War, 1812–1815: Andrew Jackson, the Creek War, and the Battle of New Orleans. Tuscaloosa: University of Alabama Press. ISBN 9780817318291. LCCN 2013049815. OCLC 900093586. Project MUSE book 30812.
- Robison, Dan M. (n.d.) [1971?]. "Dyer, Robert Henry (c. 1774–1826)". Biographical Directory, Tennessee General Assembly, 1796–1969 : [preliminary sketches]. No. 06: Rutherford County. Nashville, Tennessee: Tennessee State Library and Archives. pp. 17–18.
- Williams, Samuel Cole (1930). Beginnings of West Tennessee, in the land of the Chickasaws, 1541–1841. Johnson City, Tennessee: The Watauga Press. LCCN 30010946. OCLC 1664228.
