= Beech Grove, Dyer County, Tennessee =

Unincorporated community in Tennessee, US

Coordinates: 35°55′24″N 89°21′05″W

Beech Grove is an unincorporated community in Dyer County, Tennessee, in the United States.

== History ==
The community was named from the presence of beech trees near the town site.
