= Bill Sanderson =

American politician (born 1959)

Member of the Tennessee House of Representatives from the 77th district
- In office January 11, 2011 – July 24, 2019
- Preceded by: Judy Barker
- Succeeded by: Casey Hood (interim); Rusty Grills

Personal details
- Born: September 26, 1959 (age 67) Union City, Tennessee, U.S.
- Party: Republican
- Education: Lambuth University
- Website: votebill.net

Charles W. "Bill" Sanderson III (born September 26, 1959, in Union City, Tennessee) is an American who was a Republican member of the Tennessee House of Representatives representing District 77 from January 2011 to July 2019.

== Education and career ==
Sanderson earned his Bachelor of Science degree in business from Lambuth University.

He was elected to the Tennessee House in 2010.

On July 24, 2019, Sanderson resigned for what he said was to "spend more time with his family and business". Sanderson owns and operates a three-generation family business, White Squirrel Winery in his West Tennessee hometown of Kenton.

== Elections ==
- 2008: When District 77 Democratic Representative Phillip Pinion retired and left the seat open, Sanderson ran in the August 7, 2008 Republican primary, winning with 1,152 votes (65.0%), but lost the November 4, 2008 general election to Democratic nominee Judy Barker.
- 2010: Sanderson and Representative Barker were both unopposed for their August 5, 2010 primaries, setting up a rematch; Sanderson won the November 2, 2010 general election with 8,225 votes (50.9%) against Representative Barker.
- 2012: Sanderson was unopposed for the August 2, 2012 Republican primary, winning with 3,809 votes, and won the November 6, 2012 general election with 14,379 votes (66.2%) against Democratic nominee Mark Oakes.
- 2014: Sanderson was unopposed in the 2014 election, which nationally had been a landslide win for the Republicans.
- 2016: Sanderson won 81% of the vote in the general election, against 19% for an independent candidate, Tom Reasons, by a vote of 16,326 to 3,809; there was no Democratic party candidate on the ballot that November. Donald J. Trump, Sr. lead the ticket nationally in the 2016 United States elections, winning over 60% of the vote in Tennessee that year.
- 2018: Sanderson was unopposed in both the 2018 primary and general elections.
