= Chicago, Memphis and Gulf Railroad =

The Chicago, Memphis and Gulf Railroad was incorporated in 1904 as the Dyersburg Northern Railroad. It opened from a junction with an Illinois Central Railroad branch line west of Dyersburg north to Tiptonville, Tennessee, in 1907. The name was changed in 1909, and in 1911 the line was extended to Hickman, Kentucky. The intention was to continue to the Metropolis Bridge over the Ohio River near Paducah, Kentucky, via Clinton, Kentucky, and Moscow, Kentucky, and so create a low-level trunk line from Memphis. The IC was still promoting the scheme in 1915.

The line became the Hickman Division of the Illinois Central Railroad, which sold the branch to the Tennken Railroad in 1983. The track remains in service today.

== Route ==
- Dyersburg, Tennessee, junction with the Illinois Central
- Finley, Tennessee
- Lenox, Tennessee
- Miston, Tennessee
- Ridgely, Tennessee
- Wynnburg, Tennessee
- Tiptonville, Tennessee
