= Tennessee Farmers Cooperative =

- Company type: agricultural supply cooperative federation
- Founded: 1945
- Headquarters: La Vergne, Tennessee, United States
- Members: 54
- Website: www.ourcoop.com

Tennessee Farmers Cooperative (TFC) is a federated agricultural supply cooperative established in 1945 and headquartered in La Vergne, Tennessee. TFC has 54 member co-ops that are owned by some 64,000 farmers across the state. The cooperative's production and distribution centers are located at Tenco near Maryville in East Tennessee and Jackson in West Tennessee. TFC serves more than half a million customers through 164 retail outlets located in 84 of Tennessee's 95 counties as well as several locations in neighboring states of Kentucky, Georgia, Virginia, North Carolina, Arkansas, Missouri, and Mississippi. In 2014, TFC had consolidated sales of nearly $770 million.

== History ==
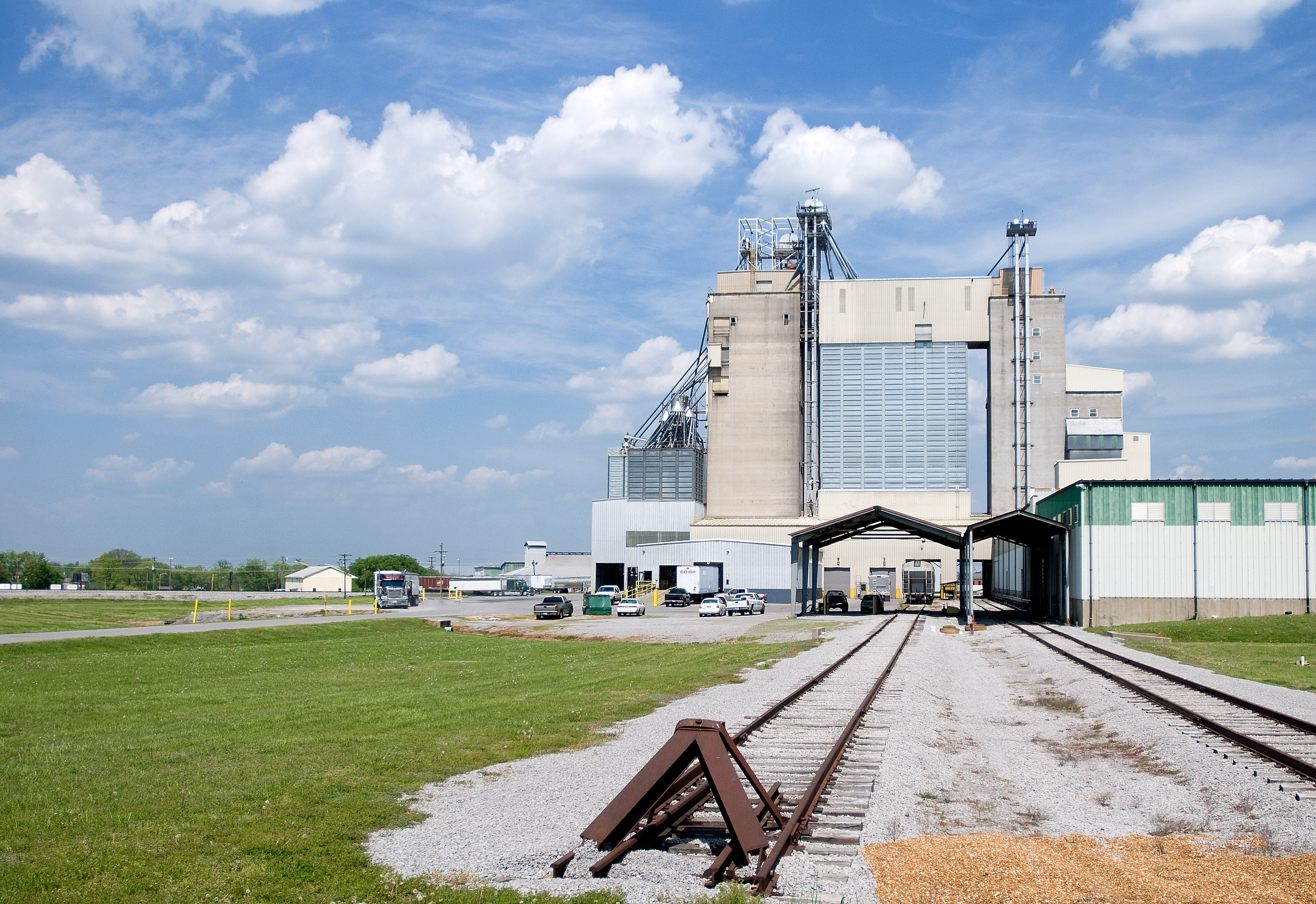
Tennessee Farmers Co-op feed mill at the La Vergne headquarters manufactures a wide variety of animal feed products.

At the conclusion of World War II, Tennesseans began to show an intense interest in forming their own farm supply business. Their dream was to have a dependable source for production inputs needed in their farming operations. After careful study of farm supply cooperatives in other states, it was the recommendation of a special committee appointed by the Tennessee Farm Bureau Federation, under the leadership of Al Jerdan, University of Tennessee marketing specialist, that a federated cooperative system be established in Tennessee.

Through the combined efforts of the 33 county associations already established and the Tennessee Farm Bureau Federation, TFC received its charter of incorporation from the state on Sept. 27, 1945. TFC headquarters were originally established in Columbia. They were later moved to Nashville and eventually to La Vergne, where they are still located.

== Local cooperative structure ==
Each of TFC's member Co-ops is a separate, independent cooperative business controlled by farmer members. The farmer members, each of whom owns one share of voting stock, are responsible for electing a local board of directors, which establishes that particular co-op's policies and employs the general manager. The daily operation of the business is under the direction and supervision of the general manager, who answers to the board of directors.

Another feature of the federated cooperative is that any savings above the cost of doing business are returned to the member patron on a patronage basis. Because savings are distributed locally, the money remains in the area where the Co-op is located.

== State cooperative structure ==
The cooperative system in Tennessee is divided into three zones, roughly reflecting the three Grand Divisions of the state — East, Middle, and West Tennessee. Three farmer–members from each zone are elected by member Co-ops to represent them on TFC's board of directors.

With its headquarters in La Vergne and facilities in East and West Tennessee, TFC has a total of three distribution centers, three fertilizer plants, five feed mills, a metal fabrication plant, a farm equipment facility, and a maintenance shop. In addition, a seed conditioning and vegetable and lawn seed packaging facility are located at Halls in West Tennessee, and TFC operates barge terminals in Nashville and Ft. Loudoun in East Tennessee.
