= Dyer County, Tennessee =

County in Tennessee, United States

- County
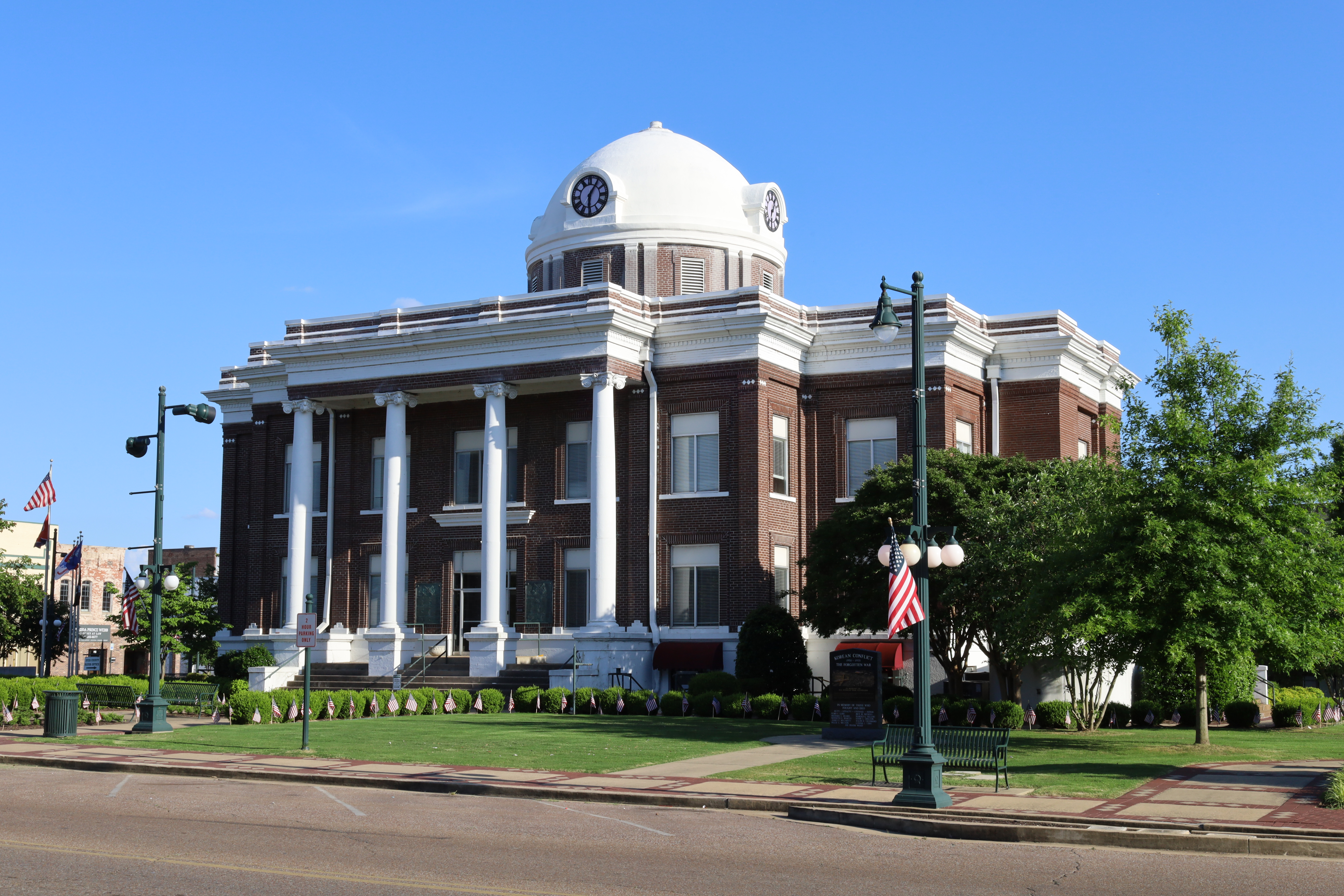
- Dyer County Courthouse in Dyersburg in 2022

- Location within the U.S. state of Tennessee
- Coordinates: 36°04′N 89°25′W
- Country: United States
- State: Tennessee
- Founded: 1823
- Named for: Robert Henry Dyer, state legislator
- Seat: Dyersburg
- Largest city: Dyersburg

Government
  - County Mayor: David Quick

Area
  - Total: 527 sq mi (1,360 km^{2})
  - Land: 512 sq mi (1,330 km^{2})
  - Water: 14 sq mi (36 km^{2}) 2.7%

Population (2020)
  - Total: 36,801
  - Estimate (2025): 36,320 ▼
  - Density: 75/sq mi (29/km^{2})
- Time zone: UTC−6 (Central)
  - Summer (DST): UTC−5 (CDT)
- Congressional district: 8th
- Website: dyercounty.com

Dyer County is a county located in the westernmost part of the U.S. state of Tennessee. As of the 2020 census, the population was 36,801. The county seat is Dyersburg. Dyer County comprises the Dyersburg, TN Micropolitan Statistical Area.

== History ==
=== 19th century ===
Dyer County was founded by a Private Act of Tennessee, passed on October 16, 1823. The area was part of the territory in Tennessee that was previously legally recognized as belonging to the Chickasaw Native Americans as "Indian Lands".

The county was named for Robert Henry Dyer (circa 1774–1826). Dyer had been an army officer in the Creek War and War of 1812, and a cavalry colonel in the First Seminole War of 1818 before becoming a state senator. He was instrumental in the formation of the counties of Dyer and Madison County, Tennessee.

Around 1823, Louis Philippe I stopped briefly near the mouth of the Obion River and killed a bald eagle.

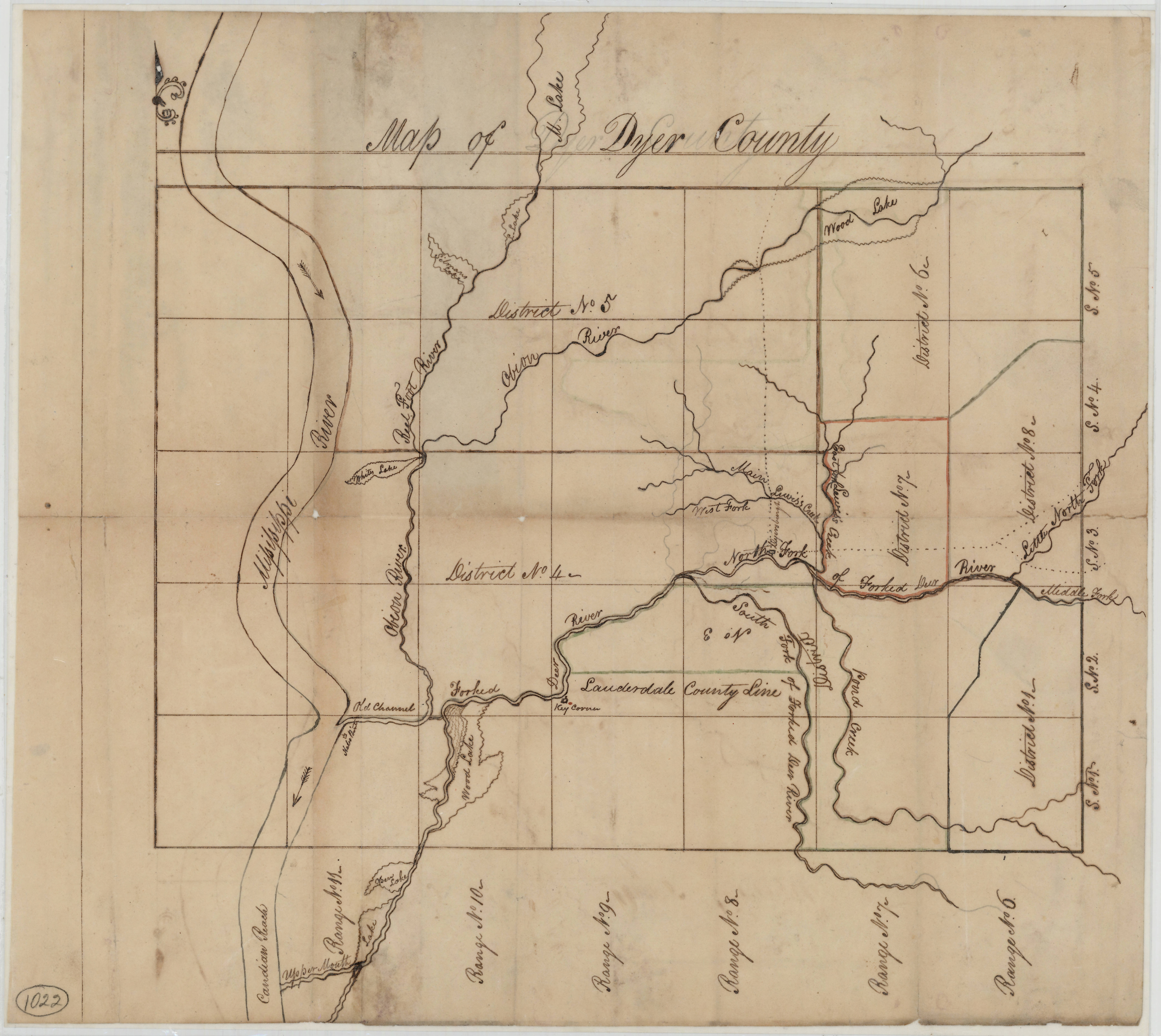
Map of Dyer County, Tennessee (1836)

One of the earlier settlers to Dyer County was McCullouch family. Alexander McCullouch, a War of 1812 veteran who served as aid-de-camp under John Coffee at the Battle of Horseshoe Bend, moved his family in the late 1820s to a plantation west of Dyersburg from northern Alabama. McCullouch's children were also involved with the development of Dyer County and the nation at large. His youngest daughter, Adelaide, married Albert Pierce, a prominent steamboat agent on the Forked Deer and Mississippi Rivers in the Reconstruction era. McCullough also had multiple sons that served in the American Civil War; Alexander Jr. who served as a colonel and head of the Dyer County Militia, Benjamin, who (according to family lore) learned to hunt bears from Davy Crockett and tried to follow him the Alamo but failed and also was killed at the Battle of Pea Ridge, and Henry who served in the Texas Rangers and married into the Ashby family of True Women fame.

In 1869, three, possibly five, white men were lynched under suspicion of horse thievery.

In May 1874, the Paducah & Memphis Railroad extended it's line from Troy to the Dyer/Obion county line. The town of Trimble was started as a station for the new terminus. A 54-mile railroad gap between Trimble and Covington (in Tipton County) continued to exist until 1882, when the Chesapeake, Ohio, & Southwestern Railroad finished construction on the line to give Dyersburg a rail connection. This line was leased to the Newport News & Mississippi Valley Railroad to operate two years later. In 1897, the line was deeded to the Illinois Central Railroad, who leased it to the Chicago, St. Louis, & New Orleans Railroad, who operated it as their "Louisville Division" (Elizabethtown, KY to Memphis via Paducah).

In Mark Twain's Life on the Mississippi, Twain reported seeing a steamboat at the mouth of the Obion River bearing his name. He notes this is the first time he encountered something named after him.

=== 20th century ===
In 1904, the Dyersburg Northern Railroad was chartered. This line connected Dyersburg to Tiptonville in Lake County and began operating in 1910. The company changed their name to the Chicago, Memphis, & Gulf Railroad in 1909.

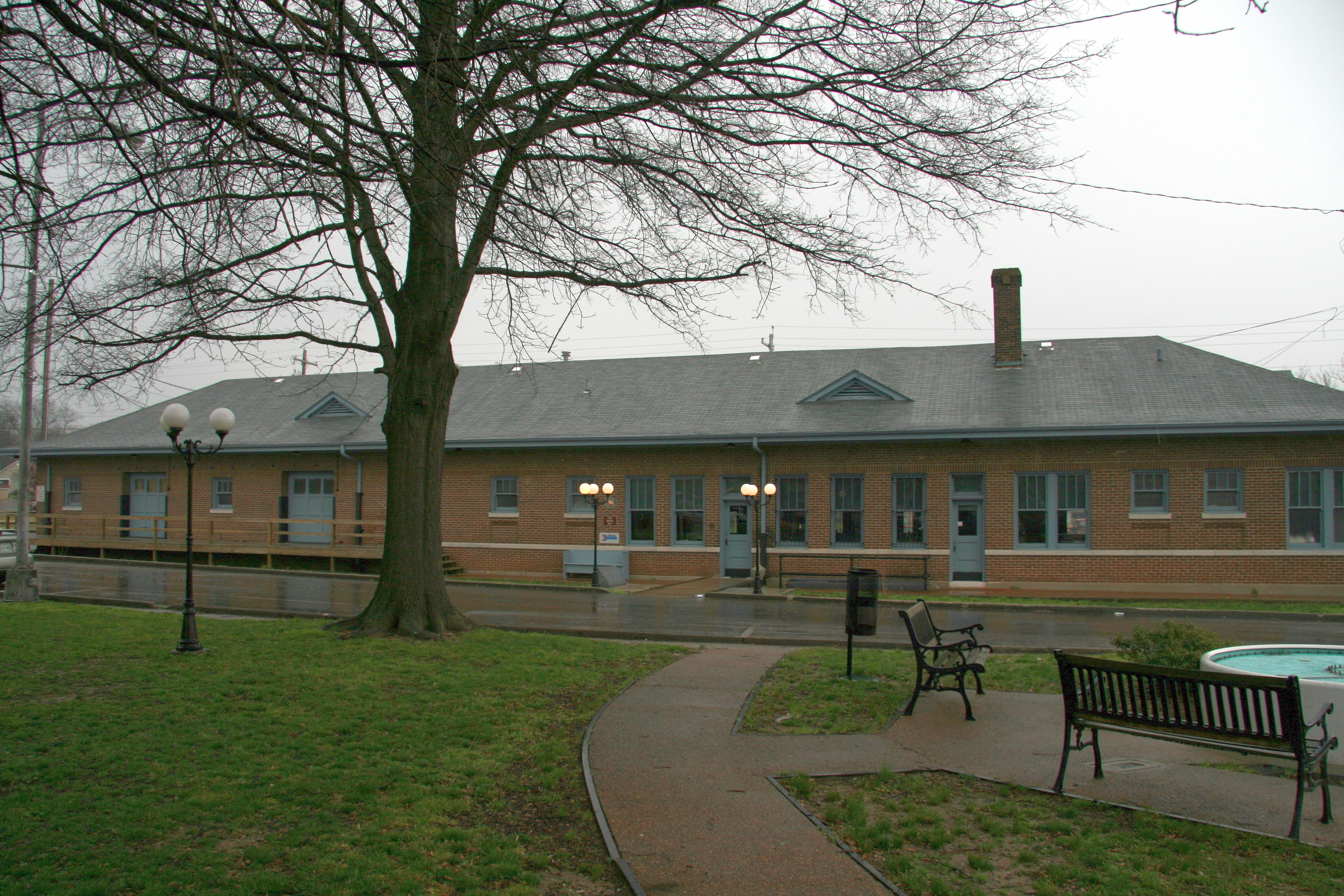
The ICC Depot at Newbern. This was constructed in 1920 to replace a depot that had burned to the ground two years prior.

On February 1, 1916, a black man named Julius Morgan was accused of raping a white woman in Dyer County. In order to avoid a lynching at the hands of a local mob, Sheriff C.C. Dawson had Morgan sent to the jail in Jackson for safety, and again to jails in Union City and Nashville. His attorneys were able to secure a change in venue to Memphis for his trial. He was convicted and sentenced to death. On July 13, 1916, Morgan was the first person to be executed by electrocution in Tennessee.

In the 1920s the Mengle Box Company of Louisville, KY operated a box manufacturing facility at the small town of Menglewood in the western part of the county on the Obion River. The town of Menglewood had over 1,200 people living in it at the height of the box factory's operations. By 1929, the Chicago, St. Louis, & New Orleans Railroad had abandoned the rail line to the small town, which was described as "almost abandoned." Musician Noah Lewis was said to have named his song "Minglewood Blues" after the town of Menglewood.

During World War 2, an auxiliary field of the Dyersburg Army Airbase, named for the town but located south in Lauderdale County, was constructed south of Dyersburg.

=== 21st century ===
On April 2, 2006 a severe weather system passed through Dyer County, producing tornadoes that killed 16 in the county and 24 in Tennessee.

== Geography ==
According to the U.S. Census Bureau, the county has a total area of 527 square miles (1,360 km^{2}), of which 512 square miles (1,330 km^{2}) is land and 14 square miles (36 km^{2}) (2.7%) is water.

The county is drained by the Mississippi River, which forms its western boundary. The confluences of the Forked Deer River into the Obion River, and the Obion into the Mississippi are located in the county. It is in the part of Tennessee called the "Mississippi bottomland" or the Mississippi Alluvial Valley.

Dyer County is bisected by U.S. Route 51, the older major highway connecting Memphis with Chicago from south to north. When upgraded to interstate standards, this road will become Interstate 69. To the west, Dyer County is connected to Missouri by Interstate 155 over the Mississippi River, providing the only highway connection, other than those at Memphis, between Tennessee and the states to the west of the river.

=== Adjacent counties ===
- Lake County (north)
- Obion County (northeast)
- Gibson County (east)
- Crockett County (southeast)
- Lauderdale County (south)
- Mississippi County, Arkansas (southwest)
- Pemiscot County, Missouri (northwest)

=== Major highways ===
- I-69
- I-155
- US 51
- US 412
- SR 77
- SR 78
- SR 89
- SR 103
- SR 104
- SR 105
- SR 181
- SR 182
- SR 210
- SR 211

== Demographics ==
Historical population
Census	Pop.	Note	%±
1830	1,904		—
1840	4,484		135.5%
1850	6,361		41.9%
1860	10,536		65.6%
1870	13,706		30.1%
1880	15,118		10.3%
1890	19,878		31.5%
1900	23,776		19.6%
1910	27,721		16.6%
1920	29,983		8.2%
1930	31,405		4.7%
1940	34,920		11.2%
1950	33,473		−4.1%
1960	29,537		−11.8%
1970	30,427		3.0%
1980	34,663		13.9%
1990	34,854		0.6%
2000	37,279		7.0%
2010	38,335		2.8%
2020	36,801		−4.0%
2025 (est.)	36,320	▼	−1.3%
U.S. Decennial Census; 1790–1960 1900–1990; 1990–2000 2010–2014

=== 2020 census ===
Dyer County racial composition
Race	Num.	Perc.
White (non-Hispanic)	28,272	76.82%
Black or African American (non-Hispanic)	5,335	14.5%
Native American	81	0.22%
Asian	213	0.58%
Pacific Islander	11	0.03%
Other/Mixed	1,586	4.31%
Hispanic or Latino	1,303	3.54%

As of the 2020 census, the county had a population of 36,801, with 14,787 households and 10,566 families.

The median age was 40.2 years, 24.1% of residents were under the age of 18, and 18.1% were 65 years of age or older; for every 100 females there were 93.5 males, and for every 100 females age 18 and over there were 89.6 males.

The racial makeup of the county was 77.7% White, 14.6% Black or African American, 0.2% American Indian and Alaska Native, 0.6% Asian, <0.1% Native Hawaiian and Pacific Islander, 1.9% from some other race, and 4.9% from two or more races, with Hispanic or Latino residents of any race comprising 3.5% of the population.

45.6% of residents lived in urban areas, while 54.4% lived in rural areas.

There were 14,787 households in the county, of which 32.3% had children under the age of 18 living in them. Of all households, 44.7% were married-couple households, 18.4% were households with a male householder and no spouse or partner present, and 30.0% were households with a female householder and no spouse or partner present. About 28.0% of all households were made up of individuals and 12.7% had someone living alone who was 65 years of age or older.

There were 16,218 housing units, of which 8.8% were vacant. Among occupied housing units, 61.7% were owner-occupied and 38.3% were renter-occupied. The homeowner vacancy rate was 1.4% and the rental vacancy rate was 8.0%.

=== 2000 census ===
As of the census of 2000, there were 37,279 people, 14,751 households, and 10,458 families residing in the county. The population density was 73 people per square mile (28 people/km^{2}). There were 16,123 housing units at an average density of 32 per square mile (12/km^{2}). The racial makeup of the county was 85.40% White, 12.86% Black or African American, 0.22% Native American, 0.33% Asian, 0.02% Pacific Islander, 0.43% from other races, and 0.73% from two or more races. 1.16% of the population were Hispanic or Latino of any race.

There were 14,751 households, out of which 32.90% had children under the age of 18 living with them, 53.20% were married couples living together, 13.60% had a female householder with no husband present, and 29.10% were non-families. 25.30% of all households were made up of individuals, and 10.70% had someone living alone who was 65 years of age or older. The average household size was 2.49 and the average family size was 2.97.

In the county, the age distribution of the population shows 25.70% under the age of 18, 8.70% from 18 to 24, 28.60% from 25 to 44, 23.50% from 45 to 64, and 13.40% who were 65 years of age or older. The median age was 36 years. For every 100 females there were 92.00 males. For every 100 females age 18 and over, there were 88.80 males.

The median income for a household in the county was $32,788, and the median income for a family was $39,848. Males had a median income of $31,182 versus $21,605 for females. The per capita income for the county was $16,451. About 13.00% of families and 15.90% of the population were below the poverty line, including 21.00% of those under age 18 and 17.60% of those age 65 or over.

== Education ==
- Dyersburg State Community College – established 1969.
- Tennessee College of Applied Technology – Northwest – located in Newbern, established 1965.

There are two K–12 school districts in the county: Dyer County School District and Dyersburg City School District.

== Media ==
=== Newspapers ===
- State Gazette – 3 days/week (Sunday, Tuesday, Thursday); general news. The paper has served Dyersburg and Northwest Tennessee since 1865.

=== Radio ===
- Burks Broadcasting – 100 Jack-FM / Eagle 97.3 / WTRO

== Transportation ==
=== US Interstate and Highways ===
Interstate 155 (Missouri–Tennessee) connects Dyersburg and the communities of Lenox and Big Boy Junction with the Missouri Bootheel via the Caruthersville Bridge, which crosses the Mississippi River at Boothspoint. This is also how U.S. Route 412 enters Tennessee from Missouri. The highway diverts south and travels through Bonicord before moving into Crockett County.

=== Tennessee State Highways ===
Tennessee State Route 78 connects Dyersburg with Nauvoo and Bogota before moving north to Lake County. U.S. Route 51 bisects Dyer County, connecting Trimble, Newbern, Dyersburg, Fowlkes, and Bonicord with Obion county to the north and Lauderdale county to the south. A bypass in Dyersburg, constructed in the 1970s, diverts traffic around the downtown core.

=== Railroad ===
The Canadian National Railway's Gulf Division runs through Trimble, Newbern, and Dyersburg to connect with Memphis to the south and the wider CN rail network to the north. The TennKen Railroad connects Dyersburg with the communities in the western part of the county, like Lenox and Miston, and travels through Lake County to the north to terminate at Hickman, KY on the Mississippi River.

Dyer County holds one of two active passenger stations in Tennessee (the other being in Memphis). Amtrak's City of New Orleans stops at the historic Illinois Central Railroad depot in Newbern twice a day.

== Communities ==
=== City ===
- Dyersburg (county seat)

=== Towns ===
- Newbern
- Trimble (partly in Obion County)

=== Census-designated places ===
- Bogota
- Finley
- Fowlkes
- Lenox
- Miston

=== Other unincorporated communities ===
- Beech Grove
- Big Boy Junction
- Bonicord
- Boothspoint
- Hawkinsville
- Heloise
- Midway
- Nauvoo
- RoEllen
- Tigrett

== Politics ==
Like most of the rural South, Dyer County is presently overwhelmingly Republican. The last Democrat to carry this county was Bill Clinton in 1996. Being overwhelmingly secessionist during the Civil War due to the strong power of the slave economy in West Tennessee, Dyer County was overwhelmingly Democratic for a century after its blacks were disfranchised. Anti-Catholicism allowed Richard Nixon to carry the county narrowly in 1960, then after the massive revolt against the Civil Rights Act and race riots segregationist Alabama Governor George Wallace carried the county in 1968 and Nixon defeated George McGovern three-to-one in 1972. Since then the county has become increasingly Republican except when Southerners Jimmy Carter and Clinton headed the presidential ticket.

United States presidential election results for Dyer County, Tennessee
Year	Republican		Democratic		Third party(ies)	
Year	No.	%	No.	%	No.	%
1912	318	14.34%	1,469	66.26%	430	19.40%
1916	459	18.42%	1,997	80.14%	36	1.44%
1920	1,166	26.76%	3,181	73.01%	10	0.23%
1924	478	16.93%	2,336	82.72%	10	0.35%
1928	842	24.04%	2,661	75.96%	0	0.00%
1932	389	9.21%	3,805	90.12%	28	0.66%
1936	557	13.93%	3,355	83.90%	87	2.18%
1940	961	21.94%	3,374	77.03%	45	1.03%
1944	1,190	26.01%	3,368	73.60%	18	0.39%
1948	989	18.44%	3,503	65.31%	872	16.26%
1952	3,231	41.30%	4,531	57.92%	61	0.78%
1956	2,682	36.21%	4,524	61.08%	201	2.71%
1960	4,097	49.95%	3,868	47.15%	238	2.90%
1964	4,517	48.92%	4,717	51.08%	0	0.00%
1968	2,826	26.41%	2,033	19.00%	5,842	54.59%
1972	6,066	75.94%	1,600	20.03%	322	4.03%
1976	4,391	41.91%	5,937	56.66%	150	1.43%
1980	5,475	48.00%	5,713	50.08%	219	1.92%
1984	6,610	62.11%	3,991	37.50%	41	0.39%
1988	6,508	63.54%	3,690	36.02%	45	0.44%
1992	5,668	44.33%	5,845	45.71%	1,274	9.96%
1996	5,059	44.48%	5,602	49.25%	713	6.27%
2000	6,282	53.05%	5,425	45.82%	134	1.13%
2004	8,447	61.17%	5,287	38.29%	75	0.54%
2008	9,859	68.23%	4,411	30.53%	180	1.25%
2012	9,921	71.81%	3,757	27.19%	138	1.00%
2016	10,180	76.33%	2,816	21.12%	340	2.55%
2020	11,768	78.04%	3,158	20.94%	153	1.01%
2024	11,603	80.61%	2,707	18.81%	84	0.58%

== Notable people ==
- Emmet Kelly – American clown, born in Dyersburg in 1898
- Noah Lewis – American blues musician, who worked in Minglewood in the 1920s
- Julius Morgan – First person executed by electric chair in Tennessee
- Lation Scott – Last recorded victim of lynching in Dyersburg in 1919

== See also ==
- National Register of Historic Places listings in Dyer County, Tennessee
