= Newbern, Tennessee =

- Town
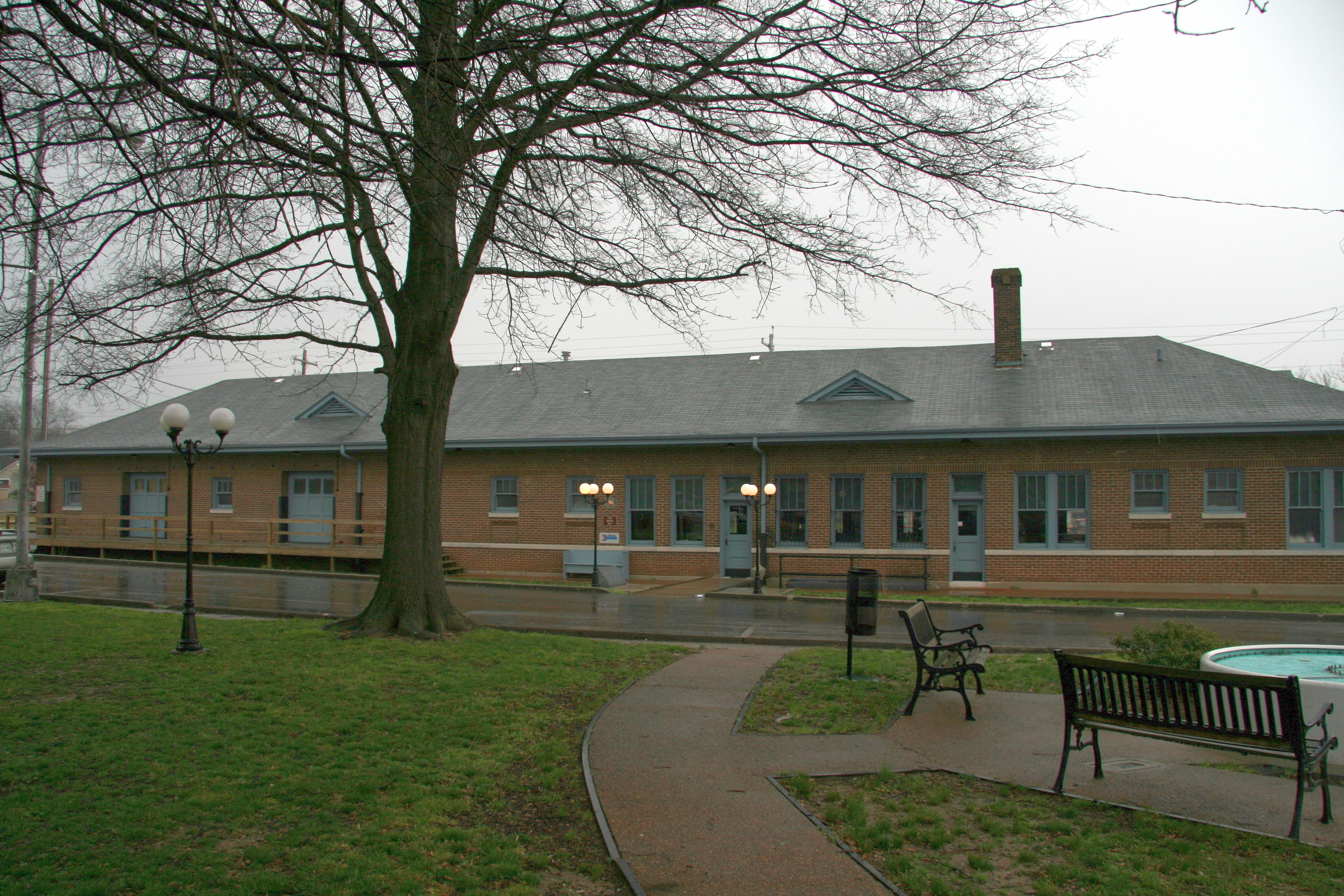
- The Amtrak Station in Newbern, TN
- Motto: "Home of the Newbern Illinois Central Depot"
- Location of Newbern in Dyer County, Tennessee.
- Coordinates: 36°6′59″N 89°16′5″W
- Country: United States
- State: Tennessee
- County: Dyer
- Incorporated: 1857-1858

Government
  - Type: Charter
  - Mayor: Pam Mabry

Area
  - Total: 4.53 sq mi (11.74 km^{2})
  - Land: 4.53 sq mi (11.74 km^{2})
  - Water: 0 sq mi (0.00 km^{2})
- Elevation: 377 ft (115 m)

Population (2020)
  - Total: 3,349
  - Density: 738.6/sq mi (285.18/km^{2})
- Time zone: UTC-6 (Central (CST))
  - Summer (DST): UTC-5 (CDT)
- ZIP code: 38059
- Area code: 731
- FIPS code: 47-52400
- GNIS feature ID: 1295678
- Website: http://www.cityofnewbern.org/

Newbern is a town in Dyer County, Tennessee. As of the 2020 census, the town population was 3,349.

== History ==
The first settlers came to the area in the 1840s. Owen Philly is credited with erecting the first house and store in the town, and it is believed that he named the town after his birthplace, New Bern, North Carolina. The Chesapeake and Ohio Railway completed a line from Memphis, TN to Newbern in 1882. By 1895, the operation of the line and depot at Newbern was taken over by the Illinois Central Railroad.

In October 1902, Garfield Burley and Curtis Brown were lynched in downtown Newbern. Burley and Brown were tied together and hung from a telephone pole within sight of the town's train depot. The lynching is notable due to the efforts of several local community leaders to prevent it.

In 1930, a Works Progress Administration guidebook described the town as a "cotton trade center" with multiple cotton gins that handled much of the ginning work from Dyer County and the surrounding counties in northwest Tennessee.

In 1957, famed singer and performer Elvis Presley lived in Newbern and worked for the state highway department during the construction of Tennessee State Route 77, driving a gravel truck.

On April 2, 2006, sixteen people were killed in Newbern when it and its surrounding communities were directly hit by an F3 tornado. The storm caused nearly $15 million in damages.

== Geography ==
According to the United States Census Bureau, the town has a total area of 4.8 square miles (12 km^{2}), all land.

=== Climate ===
The climate in this area is characterized by hot, humid summers and generally mild to cool winters. According to the Köppen Climate Classification system, Newbern has a humid subtropical climate, abbreviated "Cfa" on climate maps.

Climate data for Newbern, Tennessee
Month	Jan	Feb	Mar	Apr	May	Jun	Jul	Aug	Sep	Oct	Nov	Dec	Year
Mean daily maximum °F (°C)	47 (8)	51 (11)	60 (16)	71 (22)	80 (27)	88 (31)	91 (33)	90 (32)	84 (29)	74 (23)	60 (16)	50 (10)	70 (21)
Mean daily minimum °F (°C)	28 (−2)	31 (−1)	38 (3)	48 (9)	57 (14)	65 (18)	68 (20)	66 (19)	59 (15)	48 (9)	38 (3)	30 (−1)	48 (9)
Average precipitation inches (mm)	4.5 (110)	4 (100)	5 (130)	4.7 (120)	4.6 (120)	4 (100)	4 (100)	3.2 (81)	3.4 (86)	3.2 (81)	4.3 (110)	4.6 (120)	49.5 (1,260)
Source: Weatherbase

== Demographics ==
Historical population
Census	Pop.	Note	%±
1880	506		—
1890	1,236		144.3%
1900	1,433		15.9%
1910	1,602		11.8%
1920	1,767		10.3%
1930	1,621		−8.3%
1940	1,740		7.3%
1950	1,734		−0.3%
1960	1,695		−2.2%
1970	2,124		25.3%
1980	2,794		31.5%
1990	2,515		−10.0%
2000	2,988		18.8%
2010	3,313		10.9%
2020	3,349		1.1%

=== 2020 census ===
As of the 2020 census, Newbern had a population of 3,349. The median age was 35.7 years. 27.0% of residents were under the age of 18 and 15.9% of residents were 65 years of age or older. For every 100 females there were 87.3 males, and for every 100 females age 18 and over there were 82.9 males age 18 and over. There were 762 families residing in the town.

0.0% of residents lived in urban areas, while 100.0% lived in rural areas.

There were 1,344 households in Newbern, of which 37.4% had children under the age of 18 living in them. Of all households, 39.3% were married-couple households, 17.4% were households with a male householder and no spouse or partner present, and 36.2% were households with a female householder and no spouse or partner present. About 30.8% of all households were made up of individuals and 12.8% had someone living alone who was 65 years of age or older.

There were 1,483 housing units, of which 9.4% were vacant. The homeowner vacancy rate was 1.0% and the rental vacancy rate was 10.1%.

Newbern racial composition
Race	Num.	Perc.
White (non-Hispanic)	2,491	74.38%
Black or African American (non-Hispanic)	459	13.71%
Native American	22	0.66%
Asian	18	0.54%
Pacific Islander	1	0.03%
Other/Mixed	164	4.9%
Hispanic or Latino	194	5.79%

=== 2000 census ===
As of the census of 2000, there were 2,988 people, 1,202 households, and 854 families residing in the town. The population density was 241.4/km^{2}

There were 1,202 households, out of which 35.9% had children under the age of 18 living with them, 50.5% were married couples living together, 17.1% had a female householder with no husband present, and 28.9% were non-families. 26.1% of all households were made up of individuals, and 10.9% had someone living alone who was 65 years of age or older. The average household size was 2.48 and the average family size was 2.97.

In the town, the population was spread out, with 27.7% under the age of 18, 9.2% from 18 to 24, 29.0% from 25 to 44, 21.7% from 45 to 64, and 12.4% who were 65 years of age or older. The median age was 34 years. For every 100 females, there were 84.0 males. For every 100 females age 18 and over, there were 78.9 males.

The median income for a household in the town was $28,262, and the median income for a family was $36,853. Males had a median income of $28,393 versus $19,750 for females. The per capita income for the town was $15,575. About 14.6% of families and 16.7% of the population were below the poverty line, including 23.0% of those under age 18 and 13.9% of those age 65 or over.

== Rail transportation ==
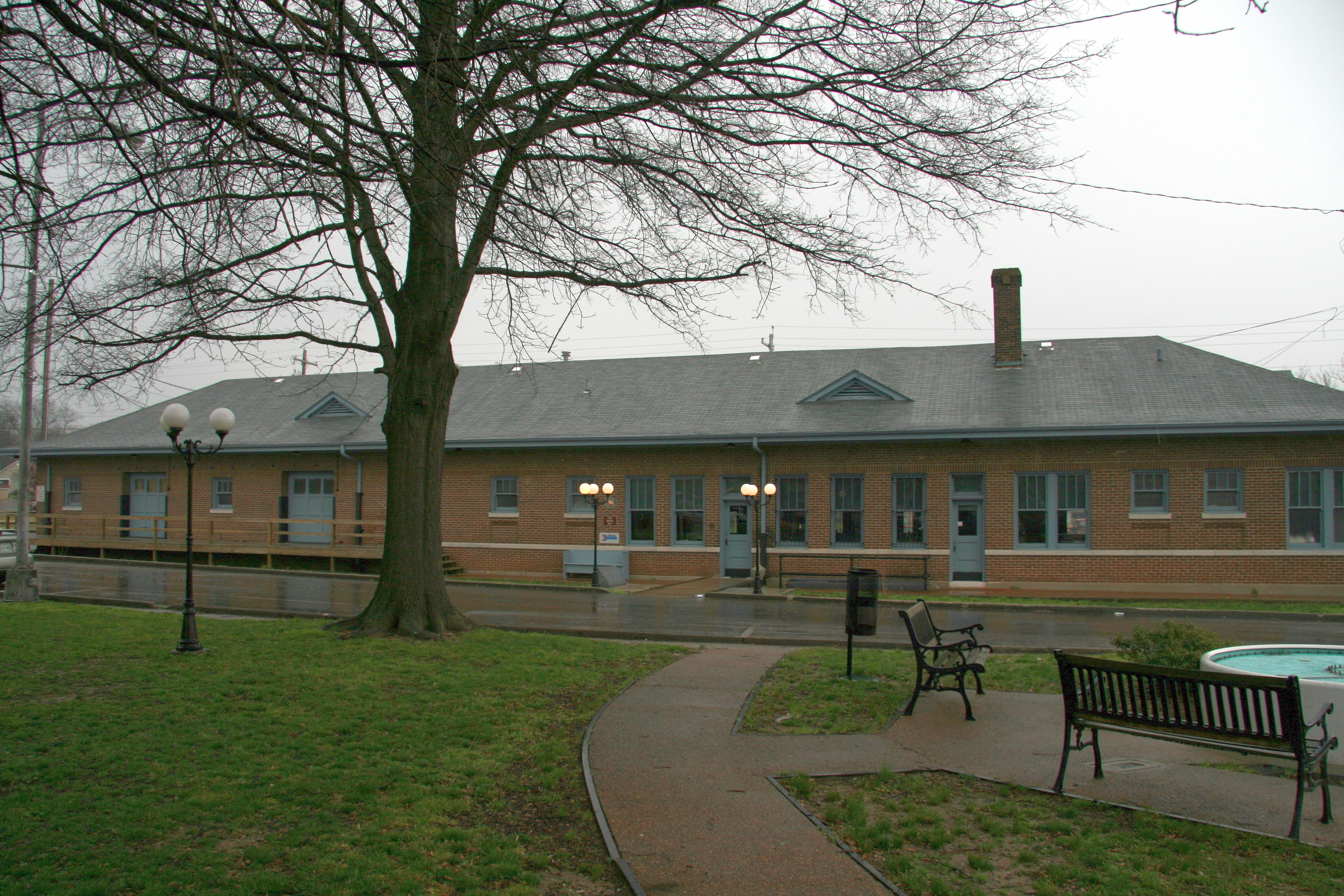
The Newbern Depot

The Newbern Depot houses a museum. The museum exhibits old photos, railroad tools, uniforms, schedules, and other memorabilia, along with model trains and artwork commemorating the town's railroading past. On February 2, 2011, a truck was hit by a train at the crossing west of the depot. The semi landed within ten feet of the depot but caused no building damage. No one was reported injured in this event and the train itself acquired little damage, stopping prior to blocking the crossing located to the west of the depot.

Every year, the town holds a celebration around the train depot called Depot Days.

== Education ==
Dyer County School District is the area school district.

- Dyer County High School

Colleges and universities:

- Tennessee College of Applied Technology

== Notable people ==
- William Flatt (1931–2026) - D.W. Brooks Distinguished Professor at the University of Georgia
