= List of United States tornadoes from August to September 2020 =

United States tornadoes from August to September 2020
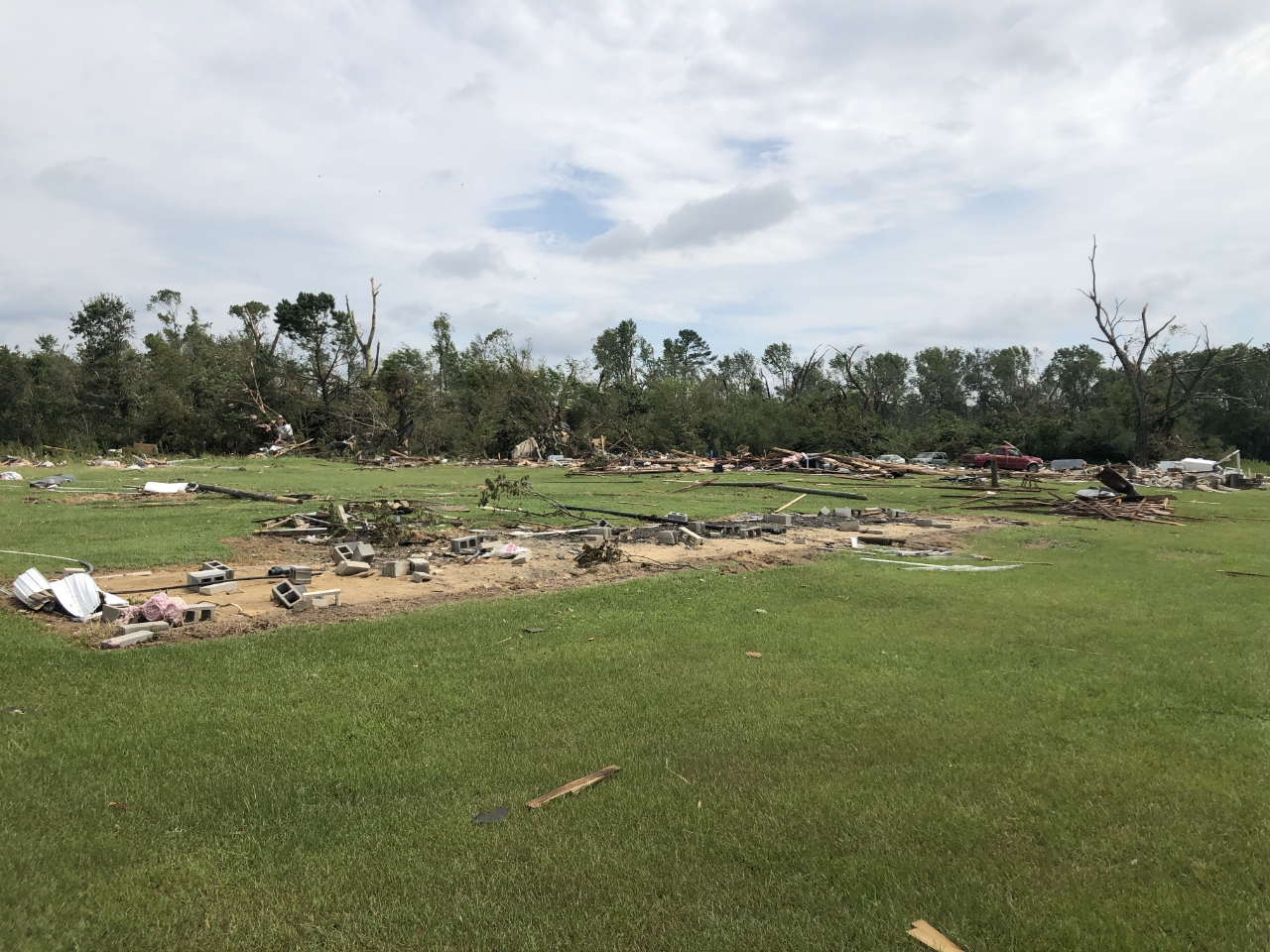
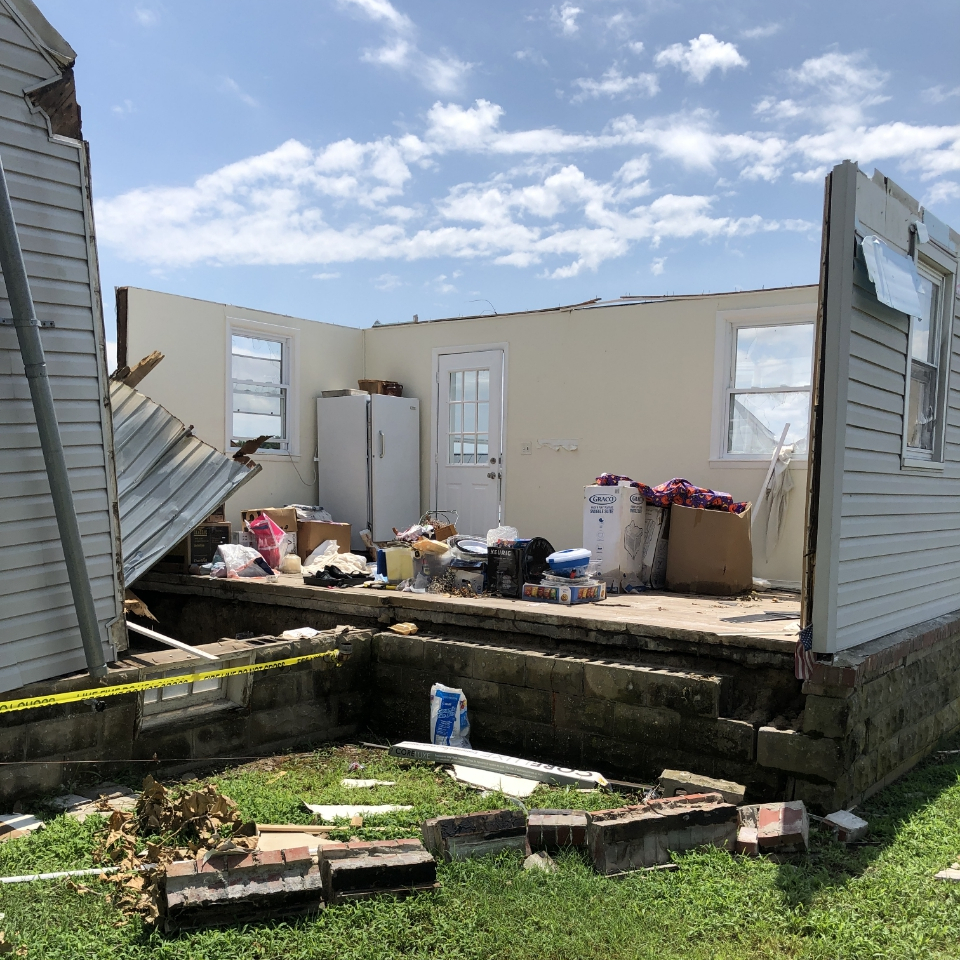
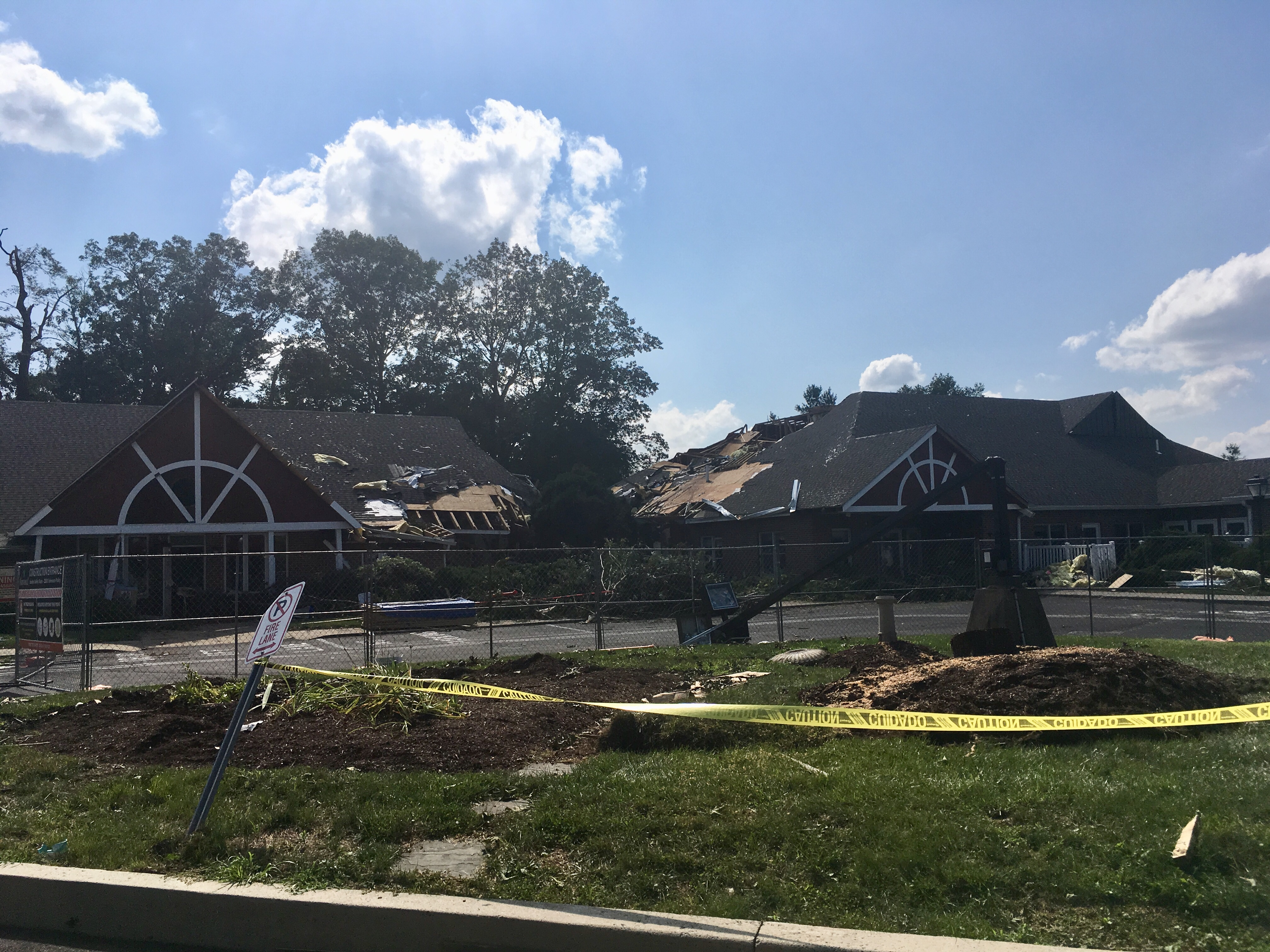
- Clockwise from top: A mobile home swept away after an EF3 tornado struck Bertie County, North Carolina on August 4; EF2 damage to a daycare in Doylestown, Pennsylvania after a tornado struck on August 4; A home after an EF2 tornado struck Mardela Springs, Maryland on August 4.
- Timespan: August 1 – September 29
- Maximum rated tornado: EF3 tornado: Woodard, North Carolina on August 4
- Tornadoes: 218
- Fatalities: 3
- Injuries: 28

This page documents confirmed tornadoes from August to September 2020 via various weather forecast offices of the National Weather Service. Based on the 1991–2010 averaging period, 83 tornadoes occur across the United States throughout August, while 74 occur in September.

A significant number of tornadoes in both months came from the tropics. August had 180 tornadoes, which was the most on record, with 55 of them coming as a result of Hurricanes Isaias and Laura. In contrast, September saw only 38 tornadoes, which was well below average, with 23 of them coming from Hurricane Sally and Tropical Storm Beta.

== United States yearly total ==
Confirmed tornadoes by Enhanced Fujita rating
| EFU | EF0 | EF1 | EF2 | EF3 | EF4 | EF5 | Total |
|---|---|---|---|---|---|---|---|
| 109 | 443 | 421 | 89 | 18 | 6 | 0 | 1,086 |

== August ==
Confirmed tornadoes by Enhanced Fujita rating
| EFU | EF0 | EF1 | EF2 | EF3 | EF4 | EF5 | Total |
|---|---|---|---|---|---|---|---|
| 14 | 83 | 71 | 11 | 1 | 0 | 0 | 180 |

=== August 1 event ===
List of confirmed tornadoes – Saturday, August 1, 2020 (Note: All dates are based on the local time zone where the tornado touched down; however, all times are in Coordinated Universal Time for consistency.)
| EF# | Location | County / Parish | State | Start Coord. | Time (UTC) | Path length | Max width |
|---|---|---|---|---|---|---|---|
| EF0 | Petronila | Nueces | TX | 27.67°N 97.63°W | 21:42–21:43 | 0.01 mi (0.016 km) | 20 yd (18 m) |
| EF0 | A video confirming a brief landspout tornado was posted on social media. No damage was found. | | | | | | |
| EF0 | NE of Haymakertown | Botetourt | VA | 37.4740°N 79.9670°W | 22:25–22:31 | 1.2 mi (1.9 km) | 75 yd (69 m) |
| EF0 | Damage was limited to uprooted trees and a few small trees that were snapped along a discontinuous path. | | | | | | |

=== August 2 event ===
List of confirmed tornadoes – Sunday, August 2, 2020
| EF# | Location | County / Parish | State | Start Coord. | Time (UTC) | Path length | Max width |
|---|---|---|---|---|---|---|---|
| EF0 | SW of Sharon | Litchfield | CT | 41.87°N 73.50°W | 21:36–21:37 | 0.25 mi (0.40 km) | 30 yd (27 m) |
| EF0 | At a nursery along the New York/Connecticut state line, greenhouses were destroyed, and large trees were uprooted. There were reports of garden supplies rotating in the air above the nursery. Additional trees were uprooted away from the nursery. | | | | | | |
| EF1 | S of Falls Village | Litchfield | CT | 41.93°N 73.37°W | 22:05–22:06 | 1.7 mi (2.7 km) | 100 yd (91 m) |
| EF1 | Many trees were snapped or uprooted. | | | | | | |
| EF0 | N of Norfolk | Litchfield | CT | 42.0202°N 73.2007°W | 22:36–22:37 | 0.5 mi (0.80 km) | 100 yd (91 m) |
| EF0 | A tornado was confirmed via photos, along with multiple eyewitness accounts. | | | | | | |
| EF0 | ESE of Sandisfield to SW of Blandford | Berkshire, Hampden | MA | 42.0911°N 73.0769°W | 22:58–23:20 | 8.39 mi (13.50 km) | 100 yd (91 m) |
| EF0 | A home had a window blown in, shingles ripped off, and its portico was lifted upward. Many trees were damaged or blown down. Some corn stalks were flattened, and a fence was blown down. | | | | | | |

=== August 3 event ===
List of confirmed tornadoes – Monday, August 3, 2020
| EF# | Location | County / Parish | State | Start Coord. | Time (UTC) | Path length | Max width |
|---|---|---|---|---|---|---|---|
| EF2 | Bald Head Island to Southport | Brunswick | NC | 33.8465°N 77.9592°W | 23:55–00:05 | 8.3 mi (13.4 km) | 80 yd (73 m) |
| EF2 | A strong waterspout moved onshore in Bald Head Island. There, homes lost roofing and had windows blown in, and a swath of large trees was flattened. It crossed the Cape Fear River, before coming onshore again in Southport. Homes and businesses were damaged, and trees were snapped or uprooted in that area before the tornado dissipated. | | | | | | |
| EF0 | SW of Bolivia | Brunswick | NC | 34.0403°N 78.1409°W | 00:15-00:19 | 2.91 mi (4.68 km) | 20 yd (18 m) |
| EF0 | Trees and tree limbs were downed along the path. | | | | | | |
| EF1 | NW of Supply | Brunswick | NC | 34.1162°N 78.3191°W | 00:15–00:16 | 0.28 mi (0.45 km) | 25 yd (23 m) |
| EF1 | Trees were damaged, including 20 pine trees which were snapped. The path may have been longer, but the area was inaccessible due to a lack of road access in the Green Swamp. | | | | | | |
| EF0 | Garden City Beach | Georgetown | SC | 33.568°N 79.0046°W | 00:20–00:21 | 0.2 mi (0.32 km) | 30 yd (27 m) |
| EF0 | A waterspout came onshore, causing minor damage to a few homes before quickly lifting. One injury occurred at a beach home. | | | | | | |
| EF1 | S of Leland to W of Navessa | Brunswick | NC | 34.2268°N 78.0124°W | 00:43–00:46 | 2.59 mi (4.17 km) | 30 yd (27 m) |
| EF1 | Trees were snapped, including several pine trees. | | | | | | |
| EF1 | Leland | Brunswick | NC | 34.2064°N 77.9810°W | 01:59–02:01 | 1.5 mi (2.4 km) | 40 yd (37 m) |
| EF1 | This tornado moved through a subdivision in Leland, where roofs and chimneys were damaged, and a garage door partially collapsed. Many trees were snapped or uprooted along the path, including several pine trees which were 2 ft (0.61 m) in diameter. | | | | | | |
| EF1 | Kennel Beach to SE of Fairfield Harbor | Pamlico | NC | 35.0238°N 76.8986°W | 03:23–03:25 | 2.35 mi (3.78 km) | 40 yd (37 m) |
| EF1 | This tornado originated as a waterspout over the Neuse River. Once it came onshore in Kennel Beach, it snapped trees, including one pine tree which fell on a home. It continued to damage trees before lifting in a rural area. | | | | | | |

=== August 4 event ===
Tornadoes were associated with Hurricane Isaias excluding the events in the Dakotas and Colorado.

List of confirmed tornadoes – Tuesday, August 4, 2020
| EF# | Location | County / Parish | State | Start Coord. | Time (UTC) | Path length | Max width |
|---|---|---|---|---|---|---|---|
| EF1 | Goose Creek State Park | Beaufort | NC | 35.4610°N 76.8952°W | 04:18–04:19 | 0.15 mi (0.24 km) | 70 yd (64 m) |
| EF1 | This tornado touched down on the southeast side of the state park. A swath of large pine trees were snapped. | | | | | | |
| EF1 | NE of Pinetown | Beaufort | NC | 35.6441°N 76.8008°W | 04:48–04:49 | 0.1 mi (0.16 km) | 50 yd (46 m) |
| EF1 | Several large hardwood trees were uprooted and large limbs were snapped by this brief tornado. Corn was damaged in a farm field as well. | | | | | | |
| EF1 | Bayview | Beaufort | NC | 35.4262°N 76.7291°W | 04:50–04:51 | 0.8 mi (1.3 km) | 180 yd (160 m) |
| EF1 | Numerous trees, the majority of which were pine, were either snapped, uprooted, or twisted. Several of the trees fell on vehicles and homes in town, causing roof and wall damage. A manufactured home sustained minor damage, and the roof of a small shed was blown off. | | | | | | |
| EF1 | SSW of Jamesville | Martin | NC | 35.7803°N 76.9094°W | 05:02–05:03 | 0.2 mi (0.32 km) | 40 yd (37 m) |
| EF1 | A large oak tree fell on a mobile home. Additional trees and crops were damaged nearby. | | | | | | |
| EF3 | SSW of Woodard to NW of Windsor | Bertie | NC | 35.8873°N 76.8904°W | 05:15–05:26 | 10 mi (16 km) | 600 yd (550 m) |
| EF3 | 2 deaths – This intense and destructive tornado first touched down southwest of Woodard just north of the Roanoke River, and immediately rapidly intensified as it moved northwest. It reached its peak intensity of EF3 strength shortly thereafter, completely destroying three mobile homes, a barn, and a single-story frame home. The frame home was completely leveled but was not anchored to its foundation. The tornado maintained its strength while reaching its peak width as it struck a mobile home park, where a dozen mobile homes were destroyed, and several others were severely damaged. Some of the mobile homes were obliterated, with their metal frames twisted and the debris scattered long distances through a nearby field. Several vehicles were tossed in this area as well. The two fatalities occurred at the mobile home park. The tornado then continued northwestward and weakened slightly to EF2 intensity, flattening a large swath of trees and causing significant damage to some homes in multiple neighborhoods. The tornado weakened further to EF1 strength as it damaged multiple businesses and homes along the concurrent US 17/Bypass US 17 and US 13 just west of Windsor. Several farm buildings were damaged northwest of Windsor before the tornado dissipated along NC 308. A total of 14 people were injured. This was strongest tornado spawned by a tropical cyclone since 2005. After the storm, North Carolina Governor Roy Cooper, toured the mobile home park hit by the tornado in Windsor, saying it was "devastating" to see what happened to the area. | | | | | | |
| EF0 | E of Menola to SW of Murfreesboro | Hertford, Northampton | NC | 36.4052°N 77.1567°W | 06:13–06:19 | 5 mi (8.0 km) | 100 yd (91 m) |
| EF0 | Mainly tree damage occurred, although the large TDS produced by the tornado prompted a PDS tornado warning. | | | | | | |
| EF0 | NE of Como, NC to E of Statesville, VA | Hertford (NC), Southampton (VA) | NC, VA | 36.5238°N 76.9581°W | 06:37–06:41 | 3.13 mi (5.04 km) | 50 yd (46 m) |
| EF0 | A weak tornado snapped limbs and downed a few trees to the northeast of Mill Neck, North Carolina. | | | | | | |
| EF2 | WSW of Franklin to N of Courtland | Southampton | VA | 36.6450°N 76.9900°W | 06:49–07:19 | 15.9 mi (25.6 km) | 200 yd (180 m) |
| EF2 | Numerous homes and businesses were damaged along US 58 near Courtland, including a hotel, which sustained total roof loss and collapse of multiple second-story exterior walls. Multiple industrial buildings and a gas station were severely damaged as well. Many trees were snapped or uprooted, and several vehicles were overturned. Overall, this tornado caused $12 million in damages. | | | | | | |
| EF1 | NW of Lynchs Corner, NC to NNW of Suffolk, VA | Pasquotank (NC), Camden (NC), City of Suffolk (VA) | NC, VA | 36.4675°N 76.4573°W | 07:02–07:30 | 26.86 mi (43.23 km) | 150 yd (140 m) |
| EF1 | This tornado moved through rural areas of the Great Dismal Swamp before striking Downtown Suffolk. Eight buildings were significantly damaged in the downtown area, including a multi-story brick building that sustained collapse of an exterior wall. Homes were also damaged in residential areas, a few of which had sections of roofing torn off. Many trees were uprooted or snapped along the path as well, some of which landed on structures. | | | | | | |
| EF0 | W of Great Dismal Swamp to ESE of Windsor | City of Suffolk | VA | 36.657°N 76.562°W | 07:08–07:22 | 11.7 mi (18.8 km) | 100 yd (91 m) |
| EF0 | This tornado hit the western side of Suffolk right before the EF1 tornado hit downtown. Damage was limited to trees being uprooted or snapped. | | | | | | |
| EF1 | NW of Jamestown | James City | VA | 37.24°N 76.86°W | 08:13–08:14 | 0.8 mi (1.3 km) | 200 yd (180 m) |
| EF1 | This brief tornado originated as a waterspout. After coming onshore, shingles were ripped off roofs, a garage door was caved in, and a brick gable collapsed. The tornado passed over a golf course before lifting. Trees and tree limbs were snapped. | | | | | | |
| EF1 | SSE of Rosewell to ENE of Capahosic | Gloucester | VA | 37.3264°N 76.5862°W | 08:53–09:00 | 4.7 mi (7.6 km) | 250 yd (230 m) |
| EF1 | This tornado originated as a waterspout over the York River before moving ashore. Numerous trees were snapped or uprooted, and several homes sustained roof and siding damage. The tornado briefly crossed the York River again before lifting. | | | | | | |
| EF2 | ENE of Palmer to N of Browns Corner | Lancaster, Northumberland | VA | 37.6274°N 76.3358°W | 09:40–10:00 | 15.6 mi (25.1 km) | 500 yd (460 m) |
| EF2 | A strong tornado produced high-end EF2 damage in the rural community of Antipoison Neck, where multiple homes sustained significant roof and exterior wall damage. The tornado weakened as it struck the eastern part of Kilmarnock, causing damage to roofs, siding, and trees. The tornado continued to cause roof and tree damage as it moved to the north before dissipating. Five people were injured. The tornado caused $3 million in damages. | | | | | | |
| EF2 | W of Mardela Springs | Wicomico | MD | 38.4474°N 75.7575°W | 09:55–10:00 | 1.3 mi (2.1 km) | 100 yd (91 m) |
| EF2 | Several homes were damaged just outside of town, including one that was pushed off its foundation and heavily damaged. Sheds and outbuildings were destroyed, and trees were snapped or uprooted, including a few that sustained some low-end debarking. An automotive repair business sustained minor damage to its overhead doors at the end of the path. | | | | | | |
| EF1 | Fleeton to W of Reedville | Northumberland | VA | 37.8137°N 76.2771°W | 10:06–10:09 | 2.2 mi (3.5 km) | 100 yd (91 m) |
| EF1 | This tornado originated as a waterspout over the Chesapeake Bay, before moving onshore in Fleeton. Several homes had roof and siding damage, a garage was destroyed, and trees were snapped or uprooted. The tornado destroyed a canopy before lifting. | | | | | | |
| EF0 | Scotland to Ridge | St. Mary's | MD | 38.093°N 76.365°W | 10:27–10:31 | 1.5 mi (2.4 km) | 75 yd (69 m) |
| EF0 | Many trees were snapped or downed along the path. | | | | | | |
| EF1 | W of Piney Point to Callaway | St. Mary's | MD | 38.174°N 76.528°W | 10:32–10:41 | 5.3 mi (8.5 km) | 100 yd (91 m) |
| EF1 | Numerous trees were snapped or uprooted, some of which fell on and damaged homes and a shed. A camper was also blown over. | | | | | | |
| EF1 | Solomons | Calvert | MD | 38.3336°N 76.4782°W | 10:52–10:53 | 0.9 mi (1.4 km) | 175 yd (160 m) |
| EF1 | Trees were snapped or uprooted, including some which fell on recreational vehicles, as well as onto several recreational facilities at a U.S. Navy compound. | | | | | | |
| EF2 | George Island Landing to Girdletree | Worcester | MD | 38.0969°N 75.3813°W | 11:14–11:17 | 3.79 mi (6.10 km) | 200 yd (180 m) |
| EF2 | A low-end EF2 tornado destroyed some chicken houses shortly after touching down. A camper and a number of outbuildings were overturned and tossed, and several homes on the edge of the path had partial roof loss and blown out windows. The tornado weakened after that, causing minor tree damage on the east side of Girdletree before dissipating. | | | | | | |
| EF0 | Quantico | Wicomico | MD | 38.3290°N 75.7318°W | 11:22–11:26 | 2.74 mi (4.41 km) | 100 yd (91 m) |
| EF0 | This tornado developed over the Wicomico River. It tracked through a residential neighborhood, causing minor damage to several homes. Siding, shingles, and gutters were damaged, and trees were uprooted. | | | | | | |
| EF1 | N of Dares Beach | Calvert | MD | 38.6150°N 76.5120°W | 11:33–11:37 | 1.7 mi (2.7 km) | 100 yd (91 m) |
| EF1 | A waterspout moved onshore at Plum Point, downing many trees and several power lines. Three houses sustained damage from fallen trees, and a fourth house had windows blown out. | | | | | | |
| EF0 | NE of Ironshire to WNW of Showell | Worcester | MD | 38.4067°N 75.2465°W | 11:35–11:44 | 7.99 mi (12.86 km) | 75 yd (69 m) |
| EF0 | This tornado crossed US 113 before snapping and uprooting trees in and around Berlin. | | | | | | |
| EF0 | S of Snug Harbor to Ocean Pines | Worcester | MD | 38.4013°N 75.1758°W | 11:55–12:05 | 9.91 mi (15.95 km) | 75 yd (69 m) |
| EF0 | An intermittent tornado occurred just east of the previous one, downing several trees, one of which landed on a home. | | | | | | |
| EF0 | Queenstown | Queen Anne's | MD | 38.93°N 76.13°W | 12:18-12:19 | 0.6 mi (0.97 km) | 35 yd (32 m) |
| EF0 | A narrow path of crop damage occurred in a corn field. Some minor tree damage occurred as well. | | | | | | |
| EF1 | Sandtown | Kent | DE | 39.01°N 75.69°W | 12:25-12:28 | 2.6 mi (4.2 km) | 200 yd (180 m) |
| EF1 | One home had some windows blown out, another had its roof blown off, while several other homes in Sandtown sustained less severe roof damage. One large garage lost its back sheet metal wall as well. | | | | | | |
| EF1 | Freeman Corner to WNW of Milford | Sussex, Kent | DE | 38.89°N 75.45°W | 12:25-12:30 | 2.7 mi (4.3 km) | 400 yd (370 m) |
| EF1 | Many trees were snapped or uprooted, some of which fell on homes. Power poles and lines were downed. | | | | | | |
| EF2 | Dover to Middletown to SW of Glasgow | Kent, New Castle | DE | 39.10°N 75.50°W | 12:55–13:30 | 35.78 mi (57.58 km) | 500 yd (460 m) |
| EF2 | As this tornado touched down on the southern side of Dover, it did significant damage to trees, some of which fell on homes. The tornado crossed US 13, where it blew off sections of roofing at a middle school. A nearby warehouse had metal walls torn off, and some tractor-trailers were blown onto their sides. A garage was also severely damaged. Damage along this first segment of the path was rated EF1. Past Dover, the tornado produced intermittent tree damage before impacting the east side of Smyrna, where more significant tree damage occurred. A weather station run by DelDOT measured a 96 mph (154 km/h) wind gust on DE 1 north of Smyrna as the tornado passed by. The tornado destroyed a car repair facility on the south end of Smyrna and damaged numerous houses. The tornado then nearly paralleled US 13 and DE 1 through the eastern side of Townsend at high-end EF1 strength, causing considerable damage to homes and businesses. Numerous trees were snapped or uprooted, and a garage was also destroyed. The tornado then reached low-end EF2 intensity as it struck Middletown, where many homes sustained significant roof, exterior wall, and garage door damage. A few of these homes sustained at least partial exterior wall loss, including one poorly constructed home that had an entire second-floor exterior wall ripped off. Low-end EF2 damage continued near Summit Bridge as multiple additional homes sustained considerable damage to the north of Middletown, one of which had half of its roof torn off. Many trees were snapped, and several other homes lost portions of their roofs in this area. Farther along the path, the tornado maintained low-end EF2 intensity as it tracked near Lums Pond and through portions of Bear, where more homes were damaged and trees were downed. The most significant damage along this segment of the path occurred as the tornado crossed DE 896 and into the Brennan Estates subdivision, where 12 homes were damaged to the point where they were declared uninhabitable. The tornado then rapidly weakened and finally lifted to the southwest of Glasgow, just prior to crossing into Cecil County, Maryland. This was the longest tracked tornado in the state since modern records began in 1950. | | | | | | |
| EF1 | Strathmere to Marmora | Cape May | NJ | 39.19°N 74.66°W | 13:45–13:50 | 5.25 mi (8.45 km) | 150 yd (140 m) |
| EF1 | This tornado originated as a waterspout before coming onshore on the south end of Corson's Inlet State Park near Strathmere. The tornado then crossed Garden State Parkway and tracked along US 9 through the southern side of Marmora. Homes and businesses were significantly damaged, including some which lost their roofs, and some which had significant damage done to their side or corner walls. One home was shifted off its foundation. Near a Coca-Cola facility, the tornado tossed containers and flipped a tractor-trailer. A large shed was upended, and vehicles were pushed. Trees were snapped or uprooted, including some which fell on cars, crushing them. | | | | | | |
| EF0 | Worcester Township | Montgomery | PA | 40.16°N 75.33°W | 14:44–14:50 | 2.8 mi (4.5 km) | 200 yd (180 m) |
| EF0 | Some small trees were downed, tree tops were snapped off, and several utility poles were pushed over. | | | | | | |
| EF1 | Ship Bottom to NNW of Mud City | Ocean | NJ | 39.63°N 74.20°W | 14:50–14:54 | 3 mi (4.8 km) | —N/a |
| EF1 | A waterspout first developed over Manahawkin Bay between Ship Bottom and Brant Beach. It crossed the Route 72 bridge over the bay before coming onshore near Mud City in mainly marshy areas. Other than some light debris seen flying over the bay bridge, no damage was found. However, a weather station located north of Egg Island measured a wind gust of 109 mph (175 km/h) at 10:53 AM EDT (14:53 UTC). This measurement was used to rate this tornado high-end EF1, as no meaningful damage was found. | | | | | | |
| EF2 | Northeast Philadelphia to Southampton to Doylestown | Bucks, Philadelphia | PA | 40.0815°N 74.9592°W | 14:50–15:10 | 20.77 mi (33.43 km) | 500 yd (460 m) |
| EF2 | This intermittent, but strong tornado first touched down just east of the Philadelphia Mills shopping mall in Northeast Philadelphia, and moved northwest at EF1 strength. At a former Walmart building undergoing reconstruction, three exhaust systems and six RTU systems were blown off the roof. Roofing, siding, and awnings were blown off many homes in the area, and some cars were either tossed or flipped. Trees were snapped or uprooted, including some which were over 100 years old. The tornado then lifted before briefly touching down in Southampton at a slightly weaker low-end EF1 intensity. Numerous trees and tree limbs were snapped, including some that damaged homes and cars. After lifting again, the tornado touched down a third time at its peak intensity of low-end EF2 in Doylestown. Bleachers on the visitors' side of an athletic field at Central Bucks High School West were tossed before the tornado hit the Doylestown Hospital complex, tossing numerous vehicles in a parking lot. Some of these vehicles were piled atop one another, and six were thrown considerable distances. The tornado then struck the Children's Village Day Care center, causing significant damage as large portions of roof structure were torn from the building. Debris from this location was strewn through a nearby field. Numerous large trees were snapped or uprooted in Doylestown, and several metal light posts were bent to the ground. The tornado weakened back to EF1 intensity as it continued northwest, damaging homes and other properties, and snapping or uprooting trees. The tornado then lifted for the final time near Lake Galena in Peace Valley Park. There were six minor injuries. | | | | | | |
| EF1 | Saugatuck Shores | Fairfield | CT | 41.10°N 73.38°W | 17:40–17:41 | 50 yd (46 m) | |
| EF1 | A waterspout over the Long Island Sound moved onshore before quickly dissipating. A house had its roof blown off, and several pine trees were snapped. This was the first tornado on record in Connecticut to be associated with a tropical storm or hurricane. | | | | | | |
| EF0 | N of Witten | Tripp | SD | 43.4734°N 100.08°W | 23:29–23:33 | 0.02 mi (0.032 km) | 10 yd (9.1 m) |
| EF0 | A brief tornado touched down in an open field, causing no damage. | | | | | | |
| EF0 | SW of Winner | Tripp | SD | 43.3291°N 99.9263°W | 23:39–23:41 | 0.02 mi (0.032 km) | 10 yd (9.1 m) |
| EF0 | A brief tornado touched down in an open field, causing no damage. | | | | | | |
| EFU | NW of White Earth | Mountrail | ND | 48.45°N 102.86°W | 00:38–00:53 | 4.36 mi (7.02 km) | 100 yd (91 m) |
| EFU | No damage was found. | | | | | | |
| EF0 | SW of Punkin Center | Lincoln | CO | 38.78°N 103.93°W | 01:56–01:57 | 0.01 mi (0.016 km) | 50 yd (46 m) |
| EF0 | A brief tornado touched down in open country, causing no damage. | | | | | | |

=== August 6 event ===
List of confirmed tornadoes – Thursday, August 6, 2020
| EF# | Location | County / Parish | State | Start Coord. | Time (UTC) | Path length | Max width |
|---|---|---|---|---|---|---|---|
| EF0 | E of Piedmont to S of Harriston | Augusta | VA | 38.221°N 78.877°W | 20:02–20:09 | 2.58 mi (4.15 km) | 100 yd (91 m) |
| EF0 | Many trees were damaged along the path. One tree fell onto a vehicle. One mobile home in a mobile home park had facade damage after an awning blew off. | | | | | | |
| EF0 | SW of Earlysville | Albemarle | VA | 38.162°N 78.491°W | 20:50–20:51 | 0.16 mi (0.26 km) | 75 yd (69 m) |
| EF0 | Some fencing was damaged at an elementary school. Some trees were snapped or uprooted. | | | | | | |

=== August 7 event ===
List of confirmed tornadoes – Friday, August 7, 2020
| EF# | Location | County / Parish | State | Start Coord. | Time (UTC) | Path length | Max width |
|---|---|---|---|---|---|---|---|
| EF1 | Ashland to Montchanin | New Castle | DE | 39.7966°N 75.6582°W | 21:40–21:51 | 4.17 mi (6.71 km) | 450 yd (410 m) |
| EF1 | Trees were snapped or uprooted, including one snapped tree that fell on a home. | | | | | | |
| EF0 | WNW of Park Rapids | Hubbard | MN | 46.93°N 95.12°W | 00:30–00:32 | 0.2 mi (0.32 km) | 25 yd (23 m) |
| EF0 | Several trees were damaged. | | | | | | |
| EF1 | ENE of Dorset to ESE of Nevis | Hubbard | MN | 46.97°N 94.9°W | 01:05–01:25 | 6.18 mi (9.95 km) | 250 yd (230 m) |
| EF1 | As the tornado crossed parts of several lakes, including the northern end of Lake Belle Taine, it snapped or uprooted numerous trees. | | | | | | |

=== August 8 event ===
List of confirmed tornadoes – Saturday, August 8, 2020
| EF# | Location | County / Parish | State | Start Coord. | Time (UTC) | Path length | Max width |
|---|---|---|---|---|---|---|---|
| EFU | ESE of Lake Minatare | Scotts Bluff | NE | 41.91°N 103.4°W | 00:30–00:35 | 0.23 mi (0.37 km) | 50 yd (46 m) |
| EFU | A short-lived landspout formed over open country. No damage was reported. | | | | | | |

=== August 9 event ===
List of confirmed tornadoes – Sunday, August 9, 2020
| EF# | Location | County / Parish | State | Start Coord. | Time (UTC) | Path length | Max width |
|---|---|---|---|---|---|---|---|
| EF1 | WSW of Berlin | LaMoure | ND | 46.3662°N 98.5613°W | 19:02–19:04 | 0.87 mi (1.40 km) | 100 yd (91 m) |
| EF1 | A pole barn was severely damaged, a trailer was overturned, and a house sustained shingle damage. A corn field was also damaged. This was the first of three tornadoes in LaMoure County in 20 minutes. | | | | | | |
| EF1 | WSW of Dakota Junction to E of St. Hilaire | Pennington | MN | 48.11°N 96.44°W | 19:13–19:46 | 22 mi (35 km) | 200 yd (180 m) |
| EF1 | The tornado snapped numerous trees and cracked at least two power poles along an intermittent path. | | | | | | |
| EFU | WSW to SSE of Berlin | LaMoure | ND | 46.37°N 98.51°W | 19:13–19:19 | 2.24 mi (3.60 km) | 100 yd (91 m) |
| EFU | The tornado did not produce any damage. This was the second of three tornadoes in LaMoure County in 20 minutes. | | | | | | |
| EF1 | NE of Cuba | Barnes | ND | 46.85°N 97.84°W | 19:17–19:24 | 2.87 mi (4.62 km) | 150 yd (140 m) |
| EF1 | Trees were snapped and shattered in at least one shelterbelt. | | | | | | |
| EFU | NE of Berlin | LaMoure | ND | 46.3872°N 98.4691°W | 19:19–19:20 | 0.3 mi (0.48 km) | 50 yd (46 m) |
| EFU | The tornado did not produce any damage. This was the last of three tornadoes in LaMoure County in 20 minutes. | | | | | | |
| EF0 | ENE of Volga to W of Hillsboro | Traill | ND | 47.4°N 97.17°W | 19:40–19:46 | 2 mi (3.2 km) | 40 yd (37 m) |
| EF0 | Trees and tree branches in shelterbelts were snapped. | | | | | | |
| EF1 | NNW of Malcolm | Beltrami | MN | 48.34°N 95.34°W | 20:20–20:22 | 0.25 mi (0.40 km) | 100 yd (91 m) |
| EF1 | The tornado produced a gash in a forest, with trees snapped at various heights. | | | | | | |
| EF0 | WSW of Cortez | Manatee | FL | 27.45°N 82.69°W | 22:15–22:17 | 0.17 mi (0.27 km) | 100 yd (91 m) |
| EF0 | A strong waterspout came ashore, damaging a lifeguard tower, a wooden canopy, and six umbrella stands, and medium-sized tree branches. | | | | | | |
| EF1 | Star Lake to W of Conover | Vilas | WI | 46.0266°N 89.46719°W | 00:44–00:58 | 6.18 mi (9.95 km) | 400 yd (370 m) |
| EF1 | This large tornado was first seen as a funnel skipping over Star Lake before touching down offshore of the East Star Lake campground. Numerous trees and power lines were blown down between the campsite and the Upper Bucktabon Spring State Natural Area, blocking off many of the nearby roadways in and out of the area. | | | | | | |
| EF1 | ESE of St. Germain to SW of Eagle River | Vilas | WI | 45.906°N 89.4044°W | 01:28–01:36 | 5.89 mi (9.48 km) | 250 yd (230 m) |
| EF1 | Trees were uprooted and snapped. | | | | | | |
| EF1 | SE of Nelma (WI) to WSW of Scotts Lake (MI) | Forest (WI), Florence (WI), Iron (MI) | WI, MI | 45.982°N 88.741°W | 02:12–02:25 | 4.59 mi (7.39 km) | 250 yd (230 m) |
| EF1 | Numerous trees were uprooted and snapped. | | | | | | |
| EF1 | E of Crystal Falls | Iron | MI | 46.0242°N 88.2304°W | 02:56–02:57 | 3.8 mi (6.1 km) | 250 yd (230 m) |
| EF1 | Multiple trees were snapped or uprooted. | | | | | | |

=== August 10 event ===
List of confirmed tornadoes – Monday, August 10, 2020 (Note: All dates are based on the local time zone where the tornado touched down; however, all times are in Coordinated Universal Time for consistency.)
| EF# | Location | County / Parish | State | Start Coord. | Time (UTC) | Path length | Max width |
|---|---|---|---|---|---|---|---|
| EFU | SW of LaMoille | Marshall | IA | 42.0016°N 93.0701°W | 16:30–16:31 | 1.03 mi (1.66 km) | 50 yd (46 m) |
| EFU | A brief tornado occurred on the leading edge of the derecho. No damage was found. | | | | | | |
| EFU | NE of Minerva | Marshall | IA | 42.125°N 93.0683°W | 16:36–16:37 | 0.42 mi (0.68 km) | 50 yd (46 m) |
| EFU | A brief tornado occurred in cropland. No damage was found. | | | | | | |
| EF1 | SSE of Albion to NNW of Marshalltown | Marshall | IA | 42.0907°N 92.9778°W | 16:39–16:42 | 2.88 mi (4.63 km) | 100 yd (91 m) |
| EF1 | Most of the damage done was to crops and trees. Some homes had minor damage. | | | | | | |
| EFU | SE of Gladbrook | Tama | IA | 42.1598°N 92.6208°W | 17:01–17:02 | 1.48 mi (2.38 km) | 40 yd (37 m) |
| EFU | Convergent path in fields were found. No damage occurred. | | | | | | |
| EFU | N of Cedar Rapids Airport | Linn | IA | 41.9063°N 91.729°W | 17:31–17:32 | 0.92 mi (1.48 km) | 40 yd (37 m) |
| EFU | A path through cropland was found on satellite imagery, ahead of a larger swath of wind damage, but no damage could be attributed to the tornado itself. | | | | | | |
| EF0 | SSW of Burton | Grant | WI | 42.694°N 90.8312°W | 17:32–17:34 | 0.55 mi (0.89 km) | 50 yd (46 m) |
| EF0 | A high-end EF0 tornado damaged two outbuildings, power lines, and hardwood trees. | | | | | | |
| EF0 | WSW of Florence to WSW of Freeport | Stephenson | IL | 42.2119°N 89.6884°W | 19:12–19:17 | 4.59 mi (7.39 km) | 50 yd (46 m) |
| EF0 | A path through cropland was found on satellite imagery ahead of a larger swath of wind damage, but no damage could be attributed to the tornado itself. | | | | | | |
| EF0 | Western Rockford | Winnebago | IL | 42.2495°N 89.1332°W | 19:37–19:38 | 1.8 mi (2.9 km) | 50 yd (46 m) |
| EF0 | First of two tornadoes to strike Rockford. Some trees were damaged along the path. | | | | | | |
| EF1 | Northeastern Rockford to Caledonia | Winnebago, Boone | IL | 42.2806°N 89.022°W | 19:47–20:05 | 9.18 mi (14.77 km) | 300 yd (270 m) |
| EF1 | Second of two tornadoes to strike Rockford. Trees and tree limbs were downed in the northeastern part of Rockford, with significant tree damage occurring in a localized area just east of Rock Valley College. Homes, apartment buildings, and businesses sustained roof, siding, and shingle damage. Numerous utility poles were downed as well, and tree limbs were downed in Caledonia before the tornado dissipated. | | | | | | |
| EF0 | Fairdale to W of Colvin Park | DeKalb | IL | 42.0962°N 88.9266°W | 19:50–19:57 | 6.28 mi (10.11 km) | 40 yd (37 m) |
| EF0 | A utility pole was snapped, trees were damaged, and a plastic covering was ripped off a greenhouse. A convergent pattern was left in flattened corn fields. | | | | | | |
| EF1 | Ottawa | LaSalle | IL | 41.353°N 88.844°W | 19:59–20:01 | 0.9 mi (1.4 km) | 150 yd (140 m) |
| EF1 | This high-end EF1 tornado ripped well-anchored roofing material off of businesses in town, and snapped a power pole was at its base. Shingles were ripped off of homes and businesses just west of IL 23. One roof, torn from a business, struck another building. Trees were shredded as well, with one tree limb significantly damaging a pickup truck. | | | | | | |
| EF1 | SE of Marengo | McHenry | IL | 42.1808°N 88.6548°W | 20:05–20:11 | 5.73 mi (9.22 km) | 200 yd (180 m) |
| EF1 | Mainly tree damage occurred, although one single family home and farm sheds were heavily damaged. Corn was flattened in a convergent pattern and two utility poles were left leaning. | | | | | | |
| EF1 | ENE of Maple Park to S of Virgil | Kane | IL | 41.9173°N 88.5605°W | 20:12–20:14 | 1.21 mi (1.95 km) | 40 yd (37 m) |
| EF1 | A narrow swath of corn was flattened in a convergent pattern. A barn lost nearly all of its roof. | | | | | | |
| EF1 | Southern Yorkville to Plainfield | Kendall, Will | IL | 41.6212°N 88.455°W | 20:15–20:30 | 14.45 mi (23.26 km) | 250 yd (230 m) |
| EF1 | As the tornado touched down on the far southern side of Yorkville, it destroyed a pergola, ripped siding off a house, and threw fencing and parts of a tree over a roadway. Trees were also damaged as the tornado crossed IL 126. The tornado reached peak intensity as it mangled trees, destroyed a farm building, and bent a large grain bin inward. Wood panels thrown by the tornado left scour marks in the ground. Six power poles were snapped, and a 1,000–1,500 lb (450–680 kg) auger was moved 50 ft (15 m). The tornado then weakened as it entered Plainfield, causing tree, fence, and siding damage. The tornado lifted just before reaching I-55, although damaging winds of up to 82 miles per hour (132 km/h) continued to damage trees and roofs into the Crest Hill community. | | | | | | |
| EF1 | Wheaton | DuPage | IL | 41.8673°N 88.1038°W | 20:35–20:36 | 0.36 mi (0.58 km) | 100 yd (91 m) |
| EF1 | A 50 ft (15 m) tall church steeple was knocked down, by this short-lived, low-end EF1 tornado. Trees were also damaged nearby on the campus of Wheaton College. Damaging winds of up to 90 miles per hour (140 kilometers per hour; 40 meters per second) caused damage in nearby Glen Ellyn after the tornado dissipated. | | | | | | |
| EF0 | Lake Geneva | Walworth | WI | 42.5568°N 88.4463°W | 20:38–20:42 | 3.29 mi (5.29 km) | 50 yd (46 m) |
| EF0 | Large limbs and tree trunks were knocked down or snapped and house sustained minor damage in a residential area before the tornado reached its peak intensity as it crossed WS 120. Numerous trees were snapped, a building sustained roof and siding damage, and a car was splattered with debris. The tornado then quickly weakened and dissipated after crossing over US 12. | | | | | | |
| EF1 | N of Lombard to N of Villa Park | DuPage | IL | 41.8851°N 88.0166°W | 20:39–20:42 | 2.15 mi (3.46 km) | 200 yd (180 m) |
| EF1 | This tornado came from the same storm that produced the Wheaton tornado. More than 200 homes were damaged, some of which sustained significant roof damage. Trees were snapped or uprooted, including some that landed on and caused damage to homes. | | | | | | |
| EF1 | SSW of Camp Lake, WI to Salem | Lake (IL), Kenosha (WI) | IL, WI | 42.475°N 88.1895°W | 20:41–20:50 | 6.25 mi (10.06 km) | 150 yd (140 m) |
| EF1 | In Illinois, the tornado damaged the roofs of homes, snapped or uprooted trees, and wrapped metal roofing from outbuildings around trees. The tornado weakened as it entered Wisconsin, where additional tree damage occurred and multiple homes sustained shingle and siding damage in the Camp Lake area. The tornado then crossed Camp Lake, toppling pontoon boats and docks. | | | | | | |
| EF1 | Oak Forest to WSW of Posen | Cook | IL | 41.618°N 87.7868°W | 20:54–20:59 | 4.84 mi (7.79 km) | 300 yd (270 m) |
| EF1 | Trees were uprooted and snapped. Two utility poles were snapped at the base and fences were blown down. Minor structural damage occurred. | | | | | | |
| EF0 | Park Forest | Will, Cook | IL | 41.4693°N 87.7017°W | 20:57–20:59 | 1.97 mi (3.17 km) | 350 yd (320 m) |
| EF0 | This high-end EF0 tornado caused mainly tree damage, including one tree that fell on a house. | | | | | | |
| EF1 | Lincolnwood to Rogers Park | Cook | IL | 42.0087°N 87.724°W | 20:59–21:04 | 3.19 mi (5.13 km) | 300 yd (270 m) |
| EF1 | A high-end EF1 tornado was caught on video lofting debris as it moved through the Rogers Park neighborhood in Chicago. Trees were snapped or uprooted, a metal light post was snapped at its base, wooden power poles were left leaning, some buildings sustained roof damage, and numerous cars were damaged or destroyed by falling trees and limbs. The tornado lifted as it moved over Lake Michigan. | | | | | | |
| EF0 | Grant Park | Kankakee | IL | 41.2431°N 87.6638°W | 21:04–21:06 | 1.47 mi (2.37 km) | 150 yd (140 m) |
| EF0 | Trees and crops were damaged outside of town before the tornado moved through it. The tornado itself downed damaged numerous trees, with some snapped and uprooted; damaged a utility pole and crops; and caused minor roof damage to a house. | | | | | | |
| EF1 | W of Belcher to NNW of Goose Island | Washington | NY | 43.280°N 73.414°W | 21:05–21:10 | 1.5 mi (2.4 km) | 100 yd (91 m) |
| EF1 | Trees were snapped or uprooted, and some shingle and siding damage occurred at a few homes as well. | | | | | | |
| EF0 | S of Ade | Newton | IN | 41.8507°N 85.4421°W | 22:15–22:16 | 0.86 mi (1.38 km) | 40 yd (37 m) |
| EF0 | One metal farm building had a portion of its roof peeled back and another had its doors blown out. Corn was flattened in a convergent pattern. | | | | | | |
| EF1 | SE of Wyatt to SW of Wakarusa | St. Joseph | IN | 41.5076°N 86.1222°W | 22:32–22:37 | 2.41 mi (3.88 km) | 100 yd (91 m) |
| EF1 | This high-end EF1 tornado was embedded in a much larger swath of damaging winds. Grain bins were toppled, several farm outbuildings were significantly damaged or destroyed, trees were damaged, and crops were flattened. A farmhouse had its brick chimney toppled over, and a utility pole was snapped. The tornado dissipated into a microburst that caused more damage farther east. | | | | | | |
| EF1 | Mineral Springs to Webster Lake | Kosciusko | IN | 41.3434°N 85.713°W | 22:55–22:00 | 3.1 mi (5.0 km) | 100 yd (91 m) |
| EF1 | Trees were snapped as this tornado crossed SR 13. A church lost roof covering, and some homes were damaged as a result of fallen trees and branches. Some homes also had minor roof damage. The tornado lifted over Webster Lake. | | | | | | |
| EF0 | S of Burket | Kosciusko | IN | 41.139°N 85.9672°W | 23:43–23:44 | 0.23 mi (0.37 km) | 50 yd (46 m) |
| EF0 | Some trees were damaged on properties. A 100–150 feet (30–46 m) circle of corn was flattened in a field. | | | | | | |

=== August 11 event ===
List of confirmed tornadoes – Tuesday, August 11, 2020
| EF# | Location | County / Parish | State | Start Coord. | Time (UTC) | Path length | Max width |
|---|---|---|---|---|---|---|---|
| EF0 | NW of Riverton | Fremont | WY | 43.1176°N 108.5544°W | 23:52–23:55 | 0.19 mi (0.31 km) | 20 yd (18 m) |
| EF0 | A small tornado briefly touched down, but did not cause any damage. | | | | | | |

=== August 13 event ===
List of confirmed tornadoes – Thursday, August 13, 2020
| EF# | Location | County / Parish | State | Start Coord. | Time (UTC) | Path length | Max width |
|---|---|---|---|---|---|---|---|
| EF0 | N of Johnstown | Brown | NE | 42.66°N 100.06°W | 00:25 | 0.1 mi (0.16 km) | 10 yd (9.1 m) |
| EF0 | A tornado briefly touched down. No damage was found. | | | | | | |
| EF1 | NE of Hazel to SW of Mavie | Pennington | MN | 48.07°N 96.04°W | 01:04–01:12 | 2 mi (3.2 km) | 120 yd (110 m) |
| EF1 | Several trees and tree branches were downed and a power pole was snapped. | | | | | | |
| EF0 | N of Gary | Norman | MN | 47.42°N 96.27°W | 01:44 | 0.1 mi (0.16 km) | 30 yd (27 m) |
| EF0 | A tornado briefly touched down in pasture land before being obscured by rain. | | | | | | |

=== August 14 event ===
List of confirmed tornadoes – Friday, August 14, 2020
| EF# | Location | County / Parish | State | Start Coord. | Time (UTC) | Path length | Max width |
|---|---|---|---|---|---|---|---|
| EF0 | NE of Charlesville | Grant | MN | 45.97°N 96.24°W | 20:38–20:40 | 0.4 mi (0.64 km) | 30 yd (27 m) |
| EF0 | A brief tornado path was found in a soybean field. | | | | | | |
| EF0 | ENE of Charlesville to S of Wendell | Grant | MN | 45.97°N 96.19°W | 20:37–20:47 | 4 mi (6.4 km) | 50 yd (46 m) |
| EF0 | The tornado did minor damage in corn and soybean fields. | | | | | | |
| EF0 | SW Elbow Lake Township | Grant | MN | 45.95°N 96.12°W | 20:39–20:42 | 1 mi (1.6 km) | 40 yd (37 m) |
| EF0 | The tornado stayed over open fields. | | | | | | |
| EF2 | W of Barrett to ENE of Elbow Lake | Grant | MN | 45.91°N 96.08°W | 20:42–21:08 | 13.4 mi (21.6 km) | 150 yd (140 m) |
| EF2 | The tornado first touched down in the far northern portion of Delaware Township, crossed through the southern side of Sanford Township, and lifted in northwestern Erdahl Township. Trees were snapped or uprooted, several power poles were snapped, and corn fields were damaged. A small tower was torn down, and roofing damage was done to homes and a golf course clubhouse. | | | | | | |
| EF1 | NW of Hoffman | Grant | MN | 45.85°N 95.85°W | 20:50–20:54 | 1.71 mi (2.75 km) | 150 yd (140 m) |
| EF1 | As the tornado tracked through south-central Elk Lake Township and crossed MN 55, it tore roofing off a home and a pole shed, and snapped or uprooted trees. | | | | | | |
| EF0 | Farwell | Pope | MN | 45.7443°N 95.6223°W | 21:17–21:19 | 1.2 mi (1.9 km) | 75 yd (69 m) |
| EF0 | Large tree branches were snapped, and several power poles were downed. | | | | | | |
| EFU | SW of Horace | Greeley | KS | 38.4062°N 101.9196°W | 21:30–21:36 | 1.24 mi (2.00 km) | 50 yd (46 m) |
| EFU | A brief landspout tornado was reported by a National Weather Service employee. No damage occurred. | | | | | | |
| EF0 | SE of Reading | Nobles | MN | 43.6655°N 95.666°W | 21:34–21:35 | 0.03 mi (0.048 km) | 10 yd (9.1 m) |
| EF0 | A brief tornado touched down in a corn field, twisting the corn crops. A small hog house was slightly displaced from its foundation. | | | | | | |
| EF0 | WSW of Osakis | Douglas | MN | 45.8545°N 95.2105°W | 21:45–21:46 | 0.61 mi (0.98 km) | 50 yd (46 m) |
| EF0 | A tornado was caught on video by a storm chaser. It hit a soybean field and a grove of trees before lifting. | | | | | | |
| EFU | SW of Tribune | Greeley | KS | 38.3221°N 101.9928°W | 21:49–21:54 | 1.34 mi (2.16 km) | 100 yd (91 m) |
| EFU | A brief tornado was reported by local law enforcement as it became rain-wrapped. No damage was found. | | | | | | |
| EF1 | W of Cushing to N of Lincoln | Todd, Morrison | MN | 46.15°N 94.6929°W | 21:53–22:01 | 5.91 mi (9.51 km) | 200 yd (180 m) |
| EF1 | Trees were uprooted. In Lincoln, a couple metal buildings were damaged. | | | | | | |
| EF0 | NE of West Union | Todd | MN | 45.8278°N 95.0473°W | 21:57–21:58 | 1.08 mi (1.74 km) | 125 yd (114 m) |
| EF0 | A garage lost roof shingles, was slightly rotated, and its door was bowed out. Large tree limbs were downed. | | | | | | |
| EF0 | SE of Hampton | Hamilton | NE | 40.8413°N 97.8645°W | 22:12–22:16 | 2.09 mi (3.36 km) | 30 yd (27 m) |
| EF0 | An old lean-to shed was destroyed, and minor damage occurred to trees and crops. | | | | | | |
| EF0 | SE of Stockham | Hamilton, Clay | NE | 40.7091°N 97.8805°W | 22:34–22:40 | 1.98 mi (3.19 km) | 35 yd (32 m) |
| EF0 | A pivot was overturned; trees and crops were damaged. | | | | | | |
| EF0 | S of Spicer to Green Lake | Kandiyohi | MN | 45.2072°N 94.986°W | 22:37–22:48 | 6.59 mi (10.61 km) | 50 yd (46 m) |
| EF0 | Docks along the edge of the lake were damaged. Trees were snapped. | | | | | | |
| EF0 | Ripley Township | Morrison | MN | 46.0678°N 94.294°W | 22:41–22:51 | 5.65 mi (9.09 km) | 200 yd (180 m) |
| EF0 | Trees were uprooted, large tree branches were snapped, and few outbuildings had minor damage. | | | | | | |
| EF0 | NW of Brownton | McLeod | MN | 44.767°N 94.3406°W | 22:44–22:49 | 2.16 mi (3.48 km) | 300 yd (270 m) |
| EF0 | Trees were snapped, a trailer was overturned, and a grain silo wall was damaged and collapsed. | | | | | | |
| EF0 | N of Atwater to W of Manannah | Kandiyohi, Meeker | MN | 45.1899°N 94.8422°W | 22:45–22:57 | 7.31 mi (11.76 km) | 50 yd (46 m) |
| EF0 | Trees were snapped or uprooted. Many corn and bean fields were damaged as well. | | | | | | |
| EF0 | SW of Bowlus | Morrison | MN | 45.7759°N 94.4501°W | 22:47–22:49 | 1.31 mi (2.11 km) | 65 yd (59 m) |
| EF0 | Large tree branches were downed. Downburst winds occurred in close proximity to the tornado. | | | | | | |
| EF1 | E of Spicer | Kandiyohi, Meeker | MN | 45.2463°N 94.8289°W | 22:49–22:55 | 3.5 mi (5.6 km) | 50 yd (46 m) |
| EF1 | One large shed was demolished and a second was heavily damaged. | | | | | | |
| EF1 | NW of Glencoe | McLeod | MN | 44.7853°N 94.2479°W | 22:50–23:01 | 2.44 mi (3.93 km) | 250 yd (230 m) |
| EF1 | Several trees were snapped or uprooted, and outbuildings were damaged. | | | | | | |
| EF0 | SSE of Saronville | Clay | NE | 40.5867°N 97.9215°W | 22:53–22:54 | 0.11 mi (0.18 km) | 25 yd (23 m) |
| EF0 | A brief tornado was videoed; it did not cause damage. | | | | | | |
| EF0 | SE of Hillman | Morrison | MN | 45.9745°N 93.8804°W | 23:09–23:12 | 2.94 mi (4.73 km) | 150 yd (140 m) |
| EF0 | Trees were uprooted. | | | | | | |
| EF0 | ENE of Strout | Meeker | MN | 45.0452°N 94.5504°W | 23:27–23:28 | 0.95 mi (1.53 km) | 25 yd (23 m) |
| EF0 | Corn fields and a grove of trees were damaged. | | | | | | |
| EF0 | Reitz Lake | Carver | MN | 44.8404°N 93.7498°W | 23:49–23:50 | 0.28 mi (0.45 km) | 75 yd (69 m) |
| EF0 | This very brief tornado formed as a waterspout on the western edge of the lake, before moving inland. A boat lift, a boat, and several trees were damaged. | | | | | | |
| EF1 | Lawler | Aitkin | MN | 46.53°N 93.18°W | 23:57–00:08 | 1.5 mi (2.4 km) | 100 yd (91 m) |
| EF1 | Outbuildings, an electrical pole, and multiple trees were damaged in Lawler. | | | | | | |
| EF1 | W of Moose Lake | Carlton | MN | 46.42°N 92.84°W | 00:10–00:13 | 2.7 mi (4.3 km) | 150 yd (140 m) |
| EF1 | The roof of a two-car garage was lifted, and a metal shed was destroyed. Numerous trees were snapped along the path. Some two-by-fours that were picked up by the tornado were driven into the ground. | | | | | | |
| EF0 | NNE of Automba | Carlton | MN | 46.54°N 93.01°W | 00:12–00:15 | 2 mi (3.2 km) | 100 yd (91 m) |
| EF0 | Trees were damaged. | | | | | | |
| EF0 | NNE of Greenfield | Hennepin | MN | 45.1378°N 93.657°W | 00:32–00:33 | 0.39 mi (0.63 km) | 65 yd (59 m) |
| EF0 | The door of a hoop barn was blown out, a corn field was flattened, and large tree branches were snapped. A storm chaser caught this tornado on video. | | | | | | |
| EF0 | Crystal | Hennepin | MN | 45.0351°N 93.368°W | 00:55–00:56 | 0.4 mi (0.64 km) | 50 yd (46 m) |
| EF0 | Some roofing damage occurred. Trees were snapped or uprooted, some of which fell onto power lines, roads, and yards. | | | | | | |

=== August 15 event ===
List of confirmed tornadoes – Saturday, August 15, 2020
| EF# | Location | County / Parish | State | Start Coord. | Time (UTC) | Path length | Max width |
|---|---|---|---|---|---|---|---|
| EF1 | S of Chilcoot | Lassen | CA | 39.7313°N 120.1284°W | 20:30–20:34 | 0.43 mi (0.69 km) | 137 yd (125 m) |
| EF1 | An anticyclonic tornado developed as a result of a Pyrocumulonimbus cloud generated by the Loyalton Fire. Several pine trees were snapped or uprooted. The National Weather Service in Reno, Nevada issued a tornado warning for the storm, this first time such a warning had ever been issued for a firenado. | | | | | | |
| EF1 | S of Chilcoot | Lassen | CA | 39.7239°N 120.1303°W | 21:04–21:08 | 0.09 mi (0.14 km) | 20 yd (18 m) |
| EF1 | An anticyclonic tornado developed as a result of a pyrocumulonimbus cloud generated by the Loyalton Fire. Several aspen trees were snapped. | | | | | | |
| EFU | SE of Chilcoot | Lassen | CA | 39.731°N 120.1009°W | 21:41–22:10 | 3.16 mi (5.09 km) | 156 yd (143 m) |
| EFU | An anticyclonic tornado developed as a result of a pyrocumulonimbus cloud generated by the Loyalton Fire. This tornado was confirmed by multiple videos and photos taken of the tornado by bystanders. | | | | | | |
| EF0 | WNW of Paradise Hills | Bernalillo | NM | 35.2075°N 106.7432°W | 22:30–22:32 | 0.01 mi (0.016 km) | 20 yd (18 m) |
| EF0 | A National Weather Service employee observed a brief landspout tornado. No damage occurred. | | | | | | |
| EF0 | SW of Akron | Washington | CO | 40.11°N 103.28°W | 23:33–23:38 | 0.01 mi (0.016 km) | 50 yd (46 m) |
| EF0 | A trained spotter observed a brief landspout tornado. No damage occurred. | | | | | | |
| EF0 | S of Midway | Washington | CO | 40.1°N 103.4°W | 23:47–23:48 | 0.01 mi (0.016 km) | 50 yd (46 m) |
| EF0 | A storm chaser observed a brief landspout tornado. No damage occurred. | | | | | | |
| EF0 | SW of Akron | Washington | CO | 40.05°N 103.35°W | 23:52–23:55 | 0.01 mi (0.016 km) | 50 yd (46 m) |
| EF0 | A trained spotter observed a brief landspout tornado. No damage occurred. | | | | | | |

=== August 16 event ===
List of confirmed tornadoes – Sunday, August 16, 2020
| EF# | Location | County / Parish | State | Start Coord. | Time (UTC) | Path length | Max width |
|---|---|---|---|---|---|---|---|
| EF1 | E of Laketon | Gray | TX | 35.5512°N 100.5965°W | 19:46–19:52 | 1.83 mi (2.95 km) | 200 yd (180 m) |
| EF1 | A residence had minor damage, including very minor damage to the roof cap, a rolled air conditioning unit, and a destroyed free standing antenna tower. A metal storage box with a car stored inside was rolled onto some farming equipment. Two barns were stripped of much of their sheet metal, causing a wall to collapse. The tornado was at its strongest as it snapped four power poles which were 10 in (25 cm) in diameter. Debris from the tornado was found 100–200 yd (91–183 m) away from the home and barns. | | | | | | |
| EF0 | Merritt Island | Brevard | FL | 28.3656°N 80.6760°W | 20:48–20:49 | 0.4 mi (0.64 km) | 25 yd (23 m) |
| EF0 | A waterspout developed on Sykes Creek, before coming onshore. The back porch of a home was lifted over the house and landed in the front yard. Fences were blown down, and roofing and trees were damaged. | | | | | | |
| EFU | NW of Timpas | Otero | CO | 37.94°N 103.9°W | 00:45–00:47 | 0.1 mi (0.16 km) | 10 yd (9.1 m) |
| EFU | A brief tornado was caught on video by a storm chaser. No damage occurred. | | | | | | |

=== August 18 event ===
List of confirmed tornadoes – Tuesday, August 18, 2020
| EF# | Location | County / Parish | State | Start Coord. | Time (UTC) | Path length | Max width |
|---|---|---|---|---|---|---|---|
| EF2 | North DeLand | Volusia | FL | 29.0349°N 81.3410°W | 19:48–20:02 | 4.59 mi (7.39 km) | 550 yd (500 m) |
| EF2 | Two homes were completely unroofed, a few other homes received moderate to major roof and structural damage, and many other homes sustained minor damage as this strong rain-wrapped tornado tracked through North Deland. Several large, healthy tree trunks were found snapped and twisted near the base, and numerous smaller trees were snapped midway up the trunk. A storage building had its roof torn off, a box delivery truck was tipped over, and a car was flipped upside down as well. | | | | | | |
| EF0 | Northern Debary | Volusia | FL | 28.9492°N 81.2660°W | 19:48–19:49 | 0.05 mi (0.080 km) | 70 yd (64 m) |
| EF0 | Several large tree branches were downed at the north edge of Debary, and a mobile home had its roof caved in. | | | | | | |

=== August 19 event ===
List of confirmed tornadoes – Wednesday, August 19, 2020
| EF# | Location | County / Parish | State | Start Coord. | Time (UTC) | Path length | Max width |
|---|---|---|---|---|---|---|---|
| EF0 | Lincroft | Monmouth | NJ | 40.3220°N 74.1283°W | 13:57–13:59 | 1.2 mi (1.9 km) | 70 yd (64 m) |
| EF0 | This tornado touched down at a baseball field on the campus of Brookdale Community College. A set of metal bleachers were tossed. As the tornado moved into a residential area, it uprooted a tree, and snapped tree limbs and the tops of some trees. More tree damage occurred as it passed through another residential area. No direct structural damage occurred, though some homes were damaged from fallen trees. | | | | | | |
| EF0 | Golden Beach | Miami-Dade | FL | 25.967°N 80.1187°W | 18:20–18:23 | 0.5 mi (0.80 km) | 160 yd (150 m) |
| EF0 | The tornado first formed as a waterspout off the coast of Sunny Isles Beach. It made landfall on the northern side of Golden Beach. Trees were snapped or uprooted, metal gates were damaged and twisted, and lawn/patio furniture was tossed. One home had water blown into it through its sliding doors. | | | | | | |

=== August 21 event ===
List of confirmed tornadoes – Friday, August 21, 2020
| EF# | Location | County / Parish | State | Start Coord. | Time (UTC) | Path length | Max width |
|---|---|---|---|---|---|---|---|
| EF0 | SW of Lake City | Marshall | SD | 45.7°N 97.44°W | 21:03–21:04 | 0.09 mi (0.14 km) | 10 yd (9.1 m) |
| EF0 | A trained spotter observed a brief waterspout over Roy Lake. No damage occurred as the waterspout never came onshore. | | | | | | |

=== August 22 event ===
List of confirmed tornadoes – Saturday, August 22, 2020
| EF# | Location | County / Parish | State | Start Coord. | Time (UTC) | Path length | Max width |
|---|---|---|---|---|---|---|---|
| EF0 | ENE of West Alton | Belknap | NH | 43.5666°N 71.2714°W | 16:45–16:50 | 1.54 mi (2.48 km) | 50 yd (46 m) |
| EF0 | Multiple videos caught a waterspout over Lake Winnipesaukee. No damage occurred as the waterspout never reached land. | | | | | | |
| EF0 | Center Ossipee | Carroll | NH | 43.75°N 71.15°W | 18:05–18:10 | 1.65 mi (2.66 km) | 50 yd (46 m) |
| EF0 | The tornado caused mostly minor tree damage, with a few trees snapped and uprooted and some tree branches broken. A commercial building and one other structure had minor roof and shingle damage. | | | | | | |

=== August 23 event ===
List of confirmed tornadoes – Sunday, August 23, 2020
| EF# | Location | County / Parish | State | Start Coord. | Time (UTC) | Path length | Max width |
|---|---|---|---|---|---|---|---|
| EFU | NNW of Hobbs Island | Madison | AL | 34.55°N 86.55°W | 17:13–17:21 | 0.12 mi (0.19 km) | 50 yd (46 m) |
| EFU | A research meteorologist observed a waterspout over the Tennessee River that separates Madison and Morgan counties. It became a tornado as it came onto Hobbs Island before dissipating. A mesonet camera set up by the University of Alabama in Huntsville's SWIRLL program caught the brief tornado. No damage occurred. | | | | | | |

=== August 26 event ===
Event was associated with Hurricane Laura.

List of confirmed tornadoes – Wednesday, August 26, 2020
| EF# | Location | County / Parish | State | Start Coord. | Time (UTC) | Path length | Max width |
|---|---|---|---|---|---|---|---|
| EF0 | ESE of Magnolia | Assumption | LA | 29.99°N 91.05°W | 18:55–18:56 | 0.05 mi (0.080 km) | 10 yd (9.1 m) |
| EF0 | A brief tornado touched down, producing no damage. | | | | | | |

=== August 27 event ===
The events in Arkansas were associated with Hurricane Laura.

List of confirmed tornadoes – Thursday, August 27, 2020
| EF# | Location | County / Parish | State | Start Coord. | Time (UTC) | Path length | Max width |
|---|---|---|---|---|---|---|---|
| EF1 | NW of Halcott Center | Greene | NY | 42.2162°N 74.5152°W | 18:11 | 0.25 mi (0.40 km) | 25 yd (23 m) |
| EF1 | About 15 trees on a hilltop had their tops torn off. | | | | | | |
| EF0 | Birch Hill | Litchfield | CT | 41.7°N 73.499°W | 19:24–19:25 | 0.51 mi (0.82 km) | 75 yd (69 m) |
| EF0 | Trees were snapped and uprooted. | | | | | | |
| EF0 | NW of Minortown | Litchfield | CT | 41.5771°N 73.1886°W | 19:36–19:37 | 0.06 mi (0.097 km) | 20 yd (18 m) |
| EF0 | A brief tornado downed numerous trees in various directions. | | | | | | |
| EF1 | N of Bethany to SE of North Haven | New Haven | CT | 41.4459°N 72.9875°W | 19:53–20:03 | 11.1 mi (17.9 km) | 500 yd (460 m) |
| EF1 | As the tornado touched down north of Bethany, it produced hardwood tree damage consistent with a high-end EF0 to a low-end EF1 tornado. Near Lake Bethany, significant roof damage occurred to several homes. Multiple hardwood trees were snapped as well. In Hamden, numerous buildings were damaged near the town's center, including a 2-story building which lost its flat roof. The tornado peaked in both intensity as width as it inflicted high-end EF1 damage to trees and structures in North Haven before dissipating. | | | | | | |
| EF1 | Southern Montgomery | Orange | NY | 41.505°N 74.2602°W | 22:15–22:20 | 2.6 mi (4.2 km) | 600 yd (550 m) |
| EF1 | This tornado touched down on the northwestern side of Orange County Airport before moving though the southern fringes of Montgomery. A temporary weather station recorded a sustained wind of 69 mph (111 km/h), with a gust to 82 mph (132 km/h) before being knocked offline. Trees were snapped or uprooted along the path. | | | | | | |
| EF0 | E of Palestine | St. Francis | AR | 34.96°N 90.87°W | 23:29–23:32 | 2.15 mi (3.46 km) | 60 yd (55 m) |
| EF0 | Storm chasers spotted a tornado that knocked down power lines on US 70. | | | | | | |
| EF0 | ESE of Goodrich | Woodruff | AR | 35.3051°N 91.1835°W | 23:45–23:48 | 1.26 mi (2.03 km) | 50 yd (46 m) |
| EF0 | A high-end EF0 tornado occurred just east of the small community of Riverside. The roof of a covered parking area was thrown, a large tree fell on a home, and a power pole was pushed over. | | | | | | |
| EF1 | Hickory Ridge | Cross | AR | 35.38°N 90.99°W | 00:13–00:17 | 2.15 mi (3.46 km) | 80 yd (73 m) |
| EF1 | Tornado moved directly through the center of Hickory Ridge, damaging an airplane hangar, uprooting trees, and damaging buildings in the town itself. | | | | | | |
| EF1 | Dryden to E of Egypt | Craighead | AR | 35.83°N 90.9°W | 01:31–01:36 | 3.56 mi (5.73 km) | 70 yd (64 m) |
| EF1 | Metal panels were pulled from an airplane hangar and a house sustained roof damage. Trees were uprooted. | | | | | | |
| EF0 | NNE of Red Oak | Poinsett | AR | 35.61°N 90.38°W | 01:55–01:57 | 0.89 mi (1.43 km) | 60 yd (55 m) |
| EF0 | Tornado was observed in a field by broadcast media and reported on social media. There was no damage. | | | | | | |
| EF1 | ESE of Bowman to W of Claunch | Craighead | AR | 35.81°N 90.47°W | 02:13–02:19 | 4.47 mi (7.19 km) | 120 yd (110 m) |
| EF1 | A high-end EF1 tornado significantly damaged a church west of Lake City. | | | | | | |
| EF1 | Goobertown | Craighead | AR | 35.95°N 90.56°W | 02:24–02:26 | 0.89 mi (1.43 km) | 50 yd (46 m) |
| EF1 | Three homes were damaged, one of which was partially unroofed. The tornado prompted a PDS tornado warning for nearby Greene County. | | | | | | |
| EF2 | S of Biggers to N of Ingram | Randolph | AR | 36.3076°N 90.8089°W | 03:07–03:23 | 14.02 mi (22.56 km) | 100 yd (91 m) |
| EF2 | As the tornado touched down southeast of US 62 south of Biggers, it destroyed a metal farm building, and snapped some trees. As the tornado continued to the northwest, some garage doors were blown in on some large metal buildings. After passing through Stokes, the tornado reached peak intensity in Jerrett southwest of Maynard. A home had large sections of its roof torn off and a couple of its exterior walls fell inward. A large metal outbuilding on the property was also destroyed. The tornado then weakened and dissipated shortly after that. Many trees were snapped or uprooted along the path as well. | | | | | | |

=== August 28 event ===
The events in the Southeast were associated with Hurricane Laura.

List of confirmed tornadoes – Friday, August 28, 2020
| EF# | Location | County / Parish | State | Start Coord. | Time (UTC) | Path length | Max width |
|---|---|---|---|---|---|---|---|
| EF1 | E of Redfield | Spink | SD | 44.8688°N 98.5052°W | 05:56–06:00 | 2.83 mi (4.55 km) | 40 yd (37 m) |
| EF1 | The sign of a meat processing facility was torn out of the ground. A nearby building had significant wall damage, including the north-facing wall which was destroyed. Nearby seed silos were buckled. Several vehicles had damaged windows, and a trailer was flipped into a cornfield. A circulation was evident in an adjacent cornfield, and some trees were snapped or uprooted. | | | | | | |
| EF0 | ENE of Redfield | Spink | SD | 44.8777°N 98.4811°W | 05:56–06:00 | 1.83 mi (2.95 km) | 40 yd (37 m) |
| EF0 | This tornado's path was evident in multiple cornfields, with some corn being leveled in spots. | | | | | | |
| EFU | W of De Smet Municipal Airport | Kingsbury | SD | 44.4357°N 98.6567°W | 06:26–06:27 | 0.36 mi (0.58 km) | 25 yd (23 m) |
| EFU | Damage was limited to crops, with scouring noted on satellite imagery. | | | | | | |
| EF1 | SSW of De Smet | Kingsbury | SD | 44.3302°N 98.5791°W | 06:27–06:28 | 0.61 mi (0.98 km) | 25 yd (23 m) |
| EF1 | A barn collapsed, with debris blown into another building, the top half of a concrete silo collapsed, and a few other farm buildings were damaged. Large tree limbs were snapped and crops were scoured. | | | | | | |
| EF0 | WSW of Clear Lake | Deuel | SD | 44.7182°N 96.85°W | 07:08–07:09 | 0.12 mi (0.19 km) | 50 yd (46 m) |
| EF0 | A very brief tornado destroyed a small shed pulling its anchor posts out of the ground. The roof was torn from a shed and tossed into a barn. A barn roof was partially damaged. | | | | | | |
| EF0 | W of Clear Lake (1st tornado) | Deuel | SD | 44.7740°N 96.7732°W | 07:09–07:10 | 0.21 mi (0.34 km) | 20 yd (18 m) |
| EF0 | A very brief tornado flattened corn in a convergent pattern and damaged tree limbs. | | | | | | |
| EF0 | W of Clear Lake (2nd tornado) | Deuel | SD | 44.746°N 96.8165°W | 07:09–07:10 | 0.73 mi (1.17 km) | 30 yd (27 m) |
| EF0 | A very brief tornado broke large tree limbs, uprooted a few trees, and caused minor damage to the sheet metal of a small building. | | | | | | |
| EF1 | WNW of Clear Lake | Deuel | SD | 44.7740°N 96.7732°W | 07:11–07:13 | 0.91 mi (1.46 km) | 40 yd (37 m) |
| EF1 | A hog barn lost its roof, and its walls were severely damaged. Some debris was lodged into hay bales. | | | | | | |
| EF0 | NE of Oxford | Lafayette | MS | 34.39°N 89.52°W | 11:33–11:34 | 1.1 mi (1.8 km) | 50 yd (46 m) |
| EF0 | A brief tornado caused tree damage. | | | | | | |
| EF1 | SE of Pleasant Hill to SE of Grayson | Winston | AL | 34.203°N 87.4283°W | 21:02–21:18 | 8.75 mi (14.08 km) | 325 yd (297 m) |
| EF1 | This tornado caused damage to trees and an outbuilding before striking the small rural community of Moreland. There, it removed sheathing from under a manufactured home, destroyed a small outbuilding, and removed portions of siding and sheathing from another manufactured home. Later on, the tornado tore portions of a roof off another manufactured home, damaged two garage doors, and blew out a window and damaged the exterior wall of an outdoor storage building. More trees were damaged here and to the northeast before the tornado dissipated. | | | | | | |
| EF1 | N of Double Springs | Winston | AL | 34.1684°N 87.41°W | 21:36–21:41 | 2.56 mi (4.12 km) | 100 yd (91 m) |
| EF1 | As the tornado touched down near a mobile home manufacturing facility, it peeled sheet metal off the roof of the building, removed some skirting from a modular building, destroyed a three-sided lumber shed, and blew out two windows on a vehicle. The tornado then crossed SR 33, before entering a wooded, and inaccessible area, causing more tree damage before it dissipated. | | | | | | |
| EF1 | NE of Addison to SSW of Battleground | Cullman | AL | 34.2436°N 87.1019°W | 22:27–22:36 | 5.56 mi (8.95 km) | 115 yd (105 m) |
| EF1 | A farm building sustained roof damage at the beginning of the path. The tornado was at its strongest as it destroyed two small farm buildings and knocked a single-wide mobile home off its piers, although it remained upright despite having a strap and I-beam dislodged. Damage here was rated low-end EF1. Trees were snapped and uprooted as well. | | | | | | |
| EF0 | SW of Vervilla | Warren | TN | 35.5535°N 85.9032°W | 22:28–22:31 | 1.53 mi (2.46 km) | 65 yd (59 m) |
| EF0 | A barn was significantly damaged while another small barn was destroyed, several trees were blown down, and corn was blown down in a convergent narrow path by this weak, intermittent tornado. This was the first tornado ever recorded in Warren County in the month of August. | | | | | | |
| EF0 | S of Centeredale | Cullman, Morgan | AL | 34.3062°N 86.7245°W | 22:58–23:03 | 0.22 mi (0.35 km) | 40 yd (37 m) |
| EF0 | A high-end EF0 tornado occurred just southeast of Eva. A small storage structure made out of cinder blocks was destroyed, although the structure was neither well-anchored nor was it reinforced. Large tree branches were snapped and a convergent grass pattern was left in a field. Video of the tornado also showed vehicles being lifted by the tornado and sat down, along with a boat which was pushed 3 ft (0.91 m) away. | | | | | | |
| EF0 | S of Baxter | Putnam | TN | 36.0753°N 85.6405°W | 00:24–00:28 | 2.38 mi (3.83 km) | 50 yd (46 m) |
| EF0 | A home near the beginning of the path had roof and garage door damage while several other homes sustained varying degrees of roof damage, a mobile home lost part of its roof. Further to the northeast, another mobile home was slightly damaged and an outbuilding was destroyed. Several trees were snapped or uprooted on the intermittent damage path as well. This was the first tornado ever recorded in Putnam County in the month of August. | | | | | | |

=== August 29 event ===
List of confirmed tornadoes – Saturday, August 29, 2020
| EF# | Location | County / Parish | State | Start Coord. | Time (UTC) | Path length | Max width |
|---|---|---|---|---|---|---|---|
| EF1 | W of Stillwater | Saratoga | NY | 42.939°N 73.7°W | 21:26–21:27 | 0.26 mi (0.42 km) | 50 yd (46 m) |
| EF1 | A mobile home was severely damaged. Some trees were uprooted, and tree branches were snapped. One person was injured. | | | | | | |
| EF1 | Schaghticoke | Rensselaer | NY | 42.916°N 73.595°W | 21:42–21:46 | 2.17 mi (3.49 km) | 100 yd (91 m) |
| EF1 | The roof of a home was significantly damaged, and a shed at that same home was destroyed. The high school and elementary school in Schaghticoke were damaged as well. Trees were downed in a cemetery, and there was sporadic tree damage in the later portion of the path. | | | | | | |
| EF0 | W of Hartman | Warren | NY | 43.2677°N 73.8351°W | 22:56–22:57 | 0.47 mi (0.76 km) | 100 yd (91 m) |
| EF0 | The tornado initially touched down on the Hudson River. About a dozen trees were uprooted and snapped. An outdoor canopy was destroyed and lawn furniture was scattered. | | | | | | |

=== August 30 event ===
List of confirmed tornadoes – Sunday, August 30, 2020
| EF# | Location | County / Parish | State | Start Coord. | Time (UTC) | Path length | Max width |
|---|---|---|---|---|---|---|---|
| EF2 | N of Miller | Hand | SD | 44.709°N 98.9875°W | 23:03–23:13 | 1.6 mi (2.6 km) | 300 yd (270 m) |
| EF2 | 1 death – An RV and trailer were blown off the road by this strong cone tornado, killing the driver. The RV was lofted and rolled about 200 yards (180 m) into a field. Trees and a fence line were damaged and corn was flattened in a convergent pattern. | | | | | | |

=== August 31 event ===
List of confirmed tornadoes – Monday, August 31, 2020
| EF# | Location | County / Parish | State | Start Coord. | Time (UTC) | Path length | Max width |
|---|---|---|---|---|---|---|---|
| EF1 | W of Escanaba | Delta | MI | 45.7392°N 87.1611°W | 21:30–21:32 | 0.61 mi (0.98 km) | 200 yd (180 m) |
| EF1 | A brief spin-up tornado caused extensive damage to several storage units, knocked down a few utility poles, and snapped and uprooted hundreds of trees, a couple of which fell on a residence. This tornado was unusual, as it was spawned by a low-top supercell with no lightning. | | | | | | |

== September ==
Confirmed tornadoes by Enhanced Fujita rating
| EFU | EF0 | EF1 | EF2 | EF3 | EF4 | EF5 | Total |
|---|---|---|---|---|---|---|---|
| 3 | 26 | 7 | 2 | 0 | 0 | 0 | 38 |

=== September 1 event ===
List of confirmed tornadoes – Tuesday, September 1, 2020
| EF# | Location | County / Parish | State | Start Coord. | Time (UTC) | Path length | Max width |
|---|---|---|---|---|---|---|---|
| EF1 | NE of Plumerville to N of Menifee | Conway | AR | 35.1823°N 92.6047°W | 18:59–19:05 | 3.2 mi (5.1 km) | 100 yd (91 m) |
| EF1 | This low-end EF1 tornado caused mainly tree damage, although some outbuildings and homes had minor damage. | | | | | | |
| EF0 | NW of Wooster to Bono | Faulkner | AR | 35.2258°N 92.4889°W | 19:13–19:17 | 3.2 mi (5.1 km) | 50 yd (46 m) |
| EF0 | Some trees were damaged by this tornado, which was caught on video. | | | | | | |
| EF2 | S of Heber Springs | Cleburne | AR | 35.4311°N 92.0367°W | 20:07–20:16 | 5.3 mi (8.5 km) | 150 yd (140 m) |
| EF2 | A low-end EF2 tornado snapped or uprooted many large, healthy trees and damaged multiple outbuildings. | | | | | | |
| EF0 | S of Deering | Pemiscot | MO | 36.18°N 89.88°W | 21:14–21:21 | 2.1 mi (3.4 km) | 50 yd (46 m) |
| EF0 | This tornado, which reported by broadcast media and emergency management, stayed over open farmland on an intermittent path, causing no structural damage. | | | | | | |
| EF0 | E of Beasley Crossroads | Williamson | TN | 35.8616°N 87.1367°W | 21:28–21:35 | 2.8 mi (4.5 km) | 25 yd (23 m) |
| EF0 | Several trees were damaged west of and on Interstate 840 with straight-line winds damaging more trees after the tornado dissipated. | | | | | | |
| EF0 | Mooring to N of Wynnburg | Lake | TN | 36.329°N 89.4981°W | 22:24–22:29 | 2.1 mi (3.4 km) | 50 yd (46 m) |
| EF0 | This tornado, which was reported by the public, stayed over open farmland on an intermittent path, causing no structural damage. | | | | | | |
| EFU | SSW of Lesley | Hall | TX | 34.5706°N 100.8394°W | 00:10 | 0.01 mi (0.016 km) | 30 yd (27 m) |
| EFU | A brief tornado occurred over open land and did not cause any known damage. | | | | | | |

=== September 3 event ===
List of confirmed tornadoes – Thursday, September 3, 2020
| EF# | Location | County / Parish | State | Start Coord. | Time (UTC) | Path length | Max width |
|---|---|---|---|---|---|---|---|
| EF1 | Edgewater to Arundel on the Bay | Anne Arundel | MD | 38.9480°N 76.5695°W | 21:57–22:07 | 6.05 mi (9.74 km) | 100 yd (91 m) |
| EF1 | Trees were downed where this tornado first touched down. It reached peak intensity as it crossed MD 2 into a neighborhood, where it tore away siding from the wall of a home, damaged roof flashing on a different home, and a commercial fence was blown down. Heavy tree damage occurred in this area with at 10 of them being snapped or uprooted. Some trees fell on power lines, with two power poles being snapped as a result. The tornado then weakened to EF0 strength as it crossed the South River before re-intensifying back to low-end EF1 strength entering Hillsmere Shores. There, a large tree was uprooted at The Key School soccer field and a large tree branch damaged protective netting and metal framing attached to the field's scoreboard. More trees were damaged, snapped or uprooted further to the southeast with one large uprooted tree puncturing the roof of house resulting in water intrusion. The tornado then weakened and moved offshore into the Chesapeake Bay, where it dissipated. | | | | | | |

=== September 5 event ===
List of confirmed tornadoes – Thursday, September 5, 2020
| EF# | Location | County / Parish | State | Start Coord. | Time (UTC) | Path length | Max width |
|---|---|---|---|---|---|---|---|
| EF2 | NW of Huntington Lake | Madera | CA | 37.35°N 119.34°W | 22:17–22:37 | 12.02 mi (19.34 km) | 50 yd (46 m) |
| EF2 | This was the first of two rare fire tornadoes spawned by the Creek Fire. Multiple 2 ft (0.61 m) diameter trees were snapped 20–30 feet (6.1–9.1 m) up, with branches and bark removed as well. | | | | | | |
| EF1 | NE of Huntington Lake | Fresno | CA | 37.25°N 119.20°W | 00:29–00:39 | 1.12 mi (1.80 km) | 75 yd (69 m) |
| EF1 | Second of two rare fire tornadoes spawned by the Creek Fire. Large, live 15 in (38 cm) diameter trees were snapped, and several large root balls from the trees were completely pulled out of the ground as well. | | | | | | |

=== September 7 event ===
List of confirmed tornadoes – Monday, September 7, 2020
| EF# | Location | County / Parish | State | Start Coord. | Time (UTC) | Path length | Max width |
|---|---|---|---|---|---|---|---|
| EF0 | E of Delaware to NW of Sunbury | Delaware | OH | 40.2966°N 82.9889°W | 21:14–21:17 | 3.21 mi (5.17 km) | 150 yd (140 m) |
| EF0 | Majority of damage done by this tornado was to trees. The roof of a home was partially uplifted. Shingles and other material were blown downwind. | | | | | | |

=== September 16 event ===
Events were associated with Hurricane Sally.

List of confirmed tornadoes – Wednesday, September 16, 2020
| EF# | Location | County / Parish | State | Start Coord. | Time (UTC) | Path length | Max width |
|---|---|---|---|---|---|---|---|
| EF0 | SSE of Macedonia to E of Union City | Calhoun, Jackson | FL | 30.5095°N 85.0401°W | 12:53–13:12 | 9.92 mi (15.96 km) | 50 yd (46 m) |
| EF0 | In northern Calhoun county, a shed was damaged and trees were blown down. In southern Jackson county, only damage to trees occurred. | | | | | | |
| EF0 | WSW of Cecil | Cook | GA | 31.04°N 83.4573°W | 20:30–20:35 | 2.22 mi (3.57 km) | 50 yd (46 m) |
| EF0 | Trees and powerlines were damaged. A nearby deputy reported leaves falling from the sky shortly after the tornado lifted. | | | | | | |
| EF0 | NNW of Grooverville to WNW of Pidcock | Brooks | GA | 30.7453°N 83.7287°W | 20:40–20:45 | 2.97 mi (4.78 km) | 50 yd (46 m) |
| EF0 | Only damage to trees was found. | | | | | | |
| EF0 | ESE of Morven to E of Barney | Lowndes, Brooks | GA | 30.9234°N 83.4349°W | 20:46–20:57 | 5.26 mi (8.47 km) | 50 yd (46 m) |
| EF0 | Only damage to trees was found. | | | | | | |
| EF0 | SW of Pavo | Thomas | GA | 30.9228°N 83.7527°W | 21:06–21:11 | 2.3 mi (3.7 km) | 50 yd (46 m) |
| EF0 | Only damage to trees was found. | | | | | | |
| EF1 | W of Waycross | Ware | GA | 31.2128°N 82.4029°W | 23:33–23:38 | 0.16 mi (0.26 km) | 200 yd (180 m) |
| EF1 | Gravestones were lofted and displaced at a cemetery and 20 percent of a church's roof was lifted off the building. | | | | | | |

=== September 17 event ===
Events were associated with Hurricane Sally.

List of confirmed tornadoes – Thursday, September 17, 2020
| EF# | Location | County / Parish | State | Start Coord. | Time (UTC) | Path length | Max width |
|---|---|---|---|---|---|---|---|
| EF1 | W of Rincon to S of Springfield | Effingham | GA | 32.2805°N 81.3024°W | 06:54–07:02 | 2.66 mi (4.28 km) | 150 yd (140 m) |
| EF1 | Many trees were snapped or uprooted along the path. In the community of Cypress Cove, 18 homes lost some siding and roof shingles. | | | | | | |
| EFU | WNW of Wiles Crossroads to SSE of Kingville | Sumter, Calhoun, Richland | SC | 33.7171°N 80.601°W | 11:58–12:17 | 6.9 mi (11.1 km) | 150 yd (140 m) |
| EFU | Based on an aerial survey and doppler radar, this tornado first touched down along the northern end of Lake Marion. Only tree damage was found. Although damage did occur, this tornado received an EF-Unknown rating due to the aerial survey not being able to confirm the degree of damage done to the trees. | | | | | | |
| EFU | W of Pinewood | Sumter | SC | 33.7242°N 80.5725°W | 11:59–12:04 | 2.50 mi (4.02 km) | 100 yd (91 m) |
| EFU | The tornado was confirmed by an aerial survey. Only tree damage occurred. Like the tornado that formed only a minute before this one, this tornado also received an EF-Unknown rating due to the aerial survey not being able to confirm the degree of damage done to the trees. | | | | | | |
| EF1 | NNE of Reevesville | Dorchester | SC | 33.2219°N 80.6329°W | 13:13–13:14 | 0.6 mi (0.97 km) | 150 yd (140 m) |
| EF1 | This tornado hit a tree farm, snapping or uprooting dozens of trees, along with overturning hundreds of potted trees and shrubs. A few homes had minor siding and shingle damage. | | | | | | |
| EF0 | N of Wells | Orangeburg | SC | 33.3859°N 80.4847°W | 13:49–13:50 | 0.23 mi (0.37 km) | 100 yd (91 m) |
| EF0 | A few large tree limbs were snapped as the tornado crossed US 15. | | | | | | |
| EF0 | Adams Landing | Clarendon | SC | 33.5259°N 80.4363°W | 14:17–14:19 | 0.93 mi (1.50 km) | 100 yd (91 m) |
| EF0 | This brief tornado touched down on the edge of Lake Marion, just west of I-95. Several large hardwood trees, and large tree branches were both snapped. The tornado then crossed over a small part of Lake Marion again, before snapping tree branches in the Santee National Wildlife Refuge, before dissipating. | | | | | | |
| EF0 | E of Paxville | Clarendon | SC | 33.7297°N 80.2981°W | 15:14–15:15 | 0.6 mi (0.97 km) | 25 yd (23 m) |
| EF0 | The trunk of a hardwood tree was split, and large tree branches were snapped. | | | | | | |
| EF0 | E of South Sumter to NE of East Sumter | Sumter | SC | 33.8747°N 80.2788°W | 15:43–16:00 | 5.88 mi (9.46 km) | 50 yd (46 m) |
| EF0 | Several pine trees and limbs were snapped, and a pine tree was uprooted. | | | | | | |
| EF0 | N of Lone Star | Calhoun | SC | 33.6498°N 80.5875°W | 16:06–16:08 | 1.01 mi (1.63 km) | 25 yd (23 m) |
| EF0 | Large tree branches were snapped, and a large tree was uprooted. | | | | | | |
| EF0 | E of St. Matthews | Calhoun | SC | 33.6548°N 80.7178°W | 16:45–16:46 | 0.32 mi (0.51 km) | 25 yd (23 m) |
| EF0 | Several hardwood trees were uprooted, and large tree branches were snapped. | | | | | | |
| EF0 | W of Pinewood to W of Privateer | Sumter | SC | 33.7507°N 80.5047°W | 17:19–17:28 | 6.26 mi (10.07 km) | 25 yd (23 m) |
| EF0 | A small pine and hardwood tree were both snapped. | | | | | | |
| EF0 | NE of Sardis to SE Timmonsville | Florence | SC | 34.0469°N 79.9326°W | 18:45–18:49 | 4.99 mi (8.03 km) | 25 yd (23 m) |
| EF0 | A single and double wide mobile home was damaged. The tornado crossed I-95 before lifting. One person was injured as he was clearing debris from a mobile home within 15 minutes of the tornado. | | | | | | |
| EF0 | NE of Evergreen | Florence | SC | 34.0977°N 79.6267°W | 19:21–19:24 | 2.24 mi (3.60 km) | 20 yd (18 m) |
| EF0 | Scattered tree damaged occurred. A metal carport was flipped. | | | | | | |
| EF0 | Hampstead | Pender | NC | 34.406°N 77.6313°W | 00:17–00:19 | 0.09 mi (0.14 km) | 20 yd (18 m) |
| EF0 | A few homes were damaged, fences were snapped in multiple directions, and tree limbs were snapped. | | | | | | |
| EF1 | SE of Merrimon | Carteret | NC | 34.9364°N 76.6291°W | 01:16–01:17 | 0.15 mi (0.24 km) | 25 yd (23 m) |
| EF1 | Trees were snapped. | | | | | | |
| EF0 | N of University of North Carolina Wilmington | New Hanover | NC | 34.2319°N 77.8722°W | 01:28–01:29 | 0.15 mi (0.24 km) | 20 yd (18 m) |
| EF0 | Sheathing was ripped off of two apartment buildings. Roof singles were upturned, and an unanchored mailbox stand was knocked over. | | | | | | |

=== September 18 event ===
Event was associated with Hurricane Sally.

List of confirmed tornadoes – Friday, September 18, 2020
| EF# | Location | County / Parish | State | Start Coord. | Time (UTC) | Path length | Max width |
|---|---|---|---|---|---|---|---|
| EF0 | SW of Lowland | Pamlico | NC | 35.2594°N 76.6066°W | 05:33–05:34 | 0.1 mi (0.16 km) | 20 yd (18 m) |
| EF0 | As this tornado crossed NC 33 in the Goose Creek Game Land area, pine tree limbs and a pine tree were snapped. | | | | | | |

=== September 25 event ===
Event in South Carolina was indirectly associated with Tropical Storm Beta.

List of confirmed tornadoes – Friday, September 25, 2020
| EF# | Location | County / Parish | State | Start Coord. | Time (UTC) | Path length | Max width |
|---|---|---|---|---|---|---|---|
| EF0 | NE of Myrtle Beach | Horry | SC | 33.7401°N 78.8171°W | 19:24–19:25 | 0.19 mi (0.31 km) | 25 yd (23 m) |
| EF0 | A brief waterspout moved onshore, damaging umbrellas, chairs, and small storage bins. | | | | | | |
| EF0 | SE of Rouse | Iron | WI | 46.34°N 90.45°W | 00:52–00:54 | 0.8 mi (1.3 km) | 50 yd (46 m) |
| EF0 | Minor tree damage occurred. | | | | | | |

=== September 29 event ===
List of confirmed tornadoes – Tuesday, September 29, 2020
| EF# | Location | County / Parish | State | Start Coord. | Time (UTC) | Path length | Max width |
|---|---|---|---|---|---|---|---|
| EF0 | E of Sedley | Southampton | VA | 36.7681°N 76.9348°W | 02:33–02:35 | 1.5 mi (2.4 km) | 50 yd (46 m) |
| EF0 | Three outbuildings were damaged. Trees were snapped or uprooted, including one which fell on a home, causing significant damage. | | | | | | |
| EF0 | NE of Windsor to SE of Isle of Wight | Isle of Wight | VA | 36.8315°N 76.7299°W | 02:56–03:05 | 4.3 mi (6.9 km) | 75 yd (69 m) |
| EF0 | A carport was rolled and destroyed. Several trees were snapped or uprooted. | | | | | | |

== See also ==
- Tornadoes of 2020
- List of United States tornadoes from May to July 2020
- List of United States tornadoes from October to December 2020
