= Reitz =

Reitz may refer to:

- Reitz (surname)
- Reitz, Free State, small town in South Africa
- Reitz Lake, a lake in Minnesota, United States
- Redzikowo (German Reitz), village in northern Poland

== See also ==
- Francis Joseph Reitz High School, (Public), Evansville, Indiana
- Port Reitz
- Francis Joseph Reitz Memorial High School, (Catholic), Evansville, Indiana
