= List of United States tornadoes from October to December 2020 =

United States tornadoes from October to December 2020
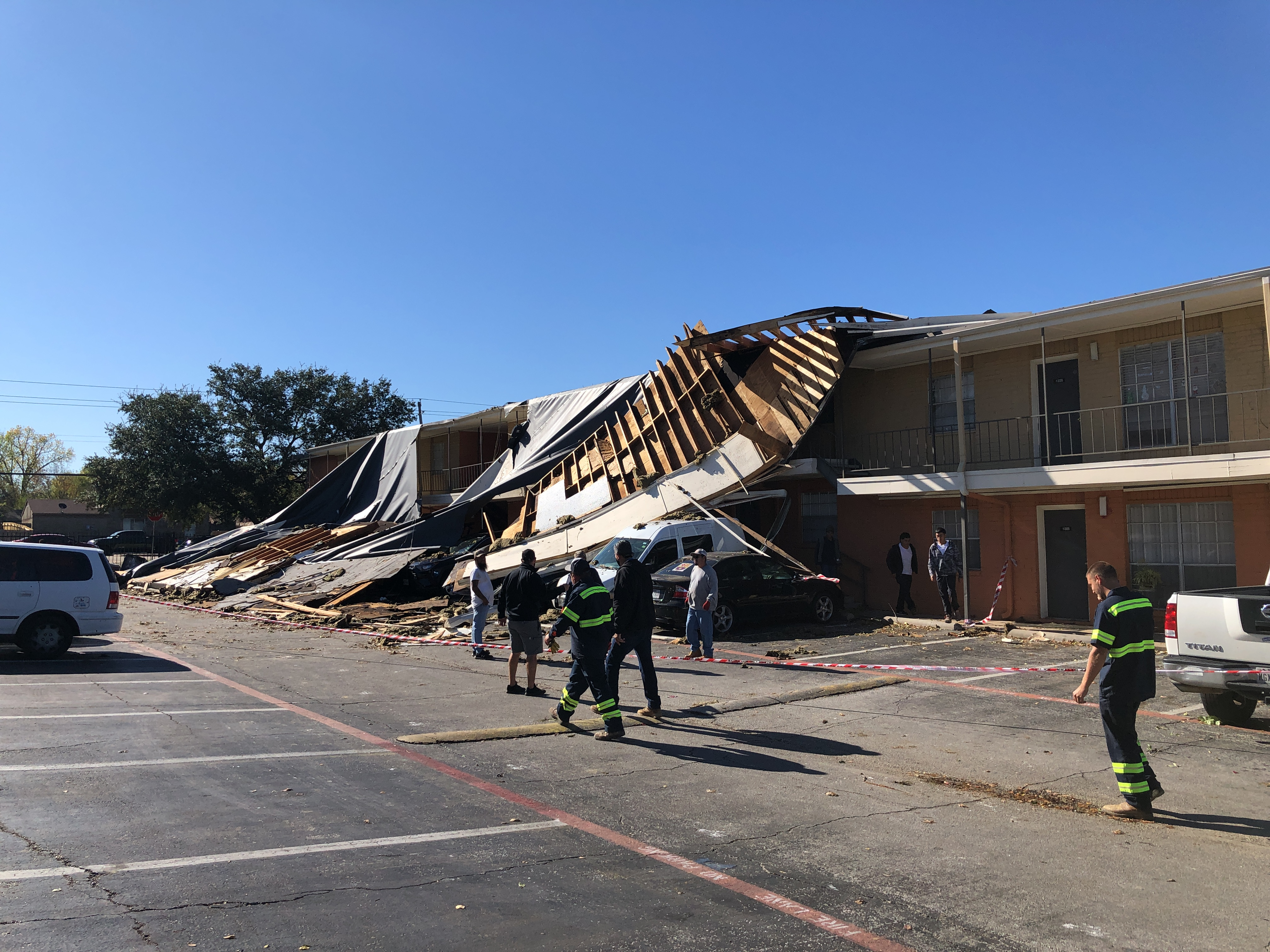
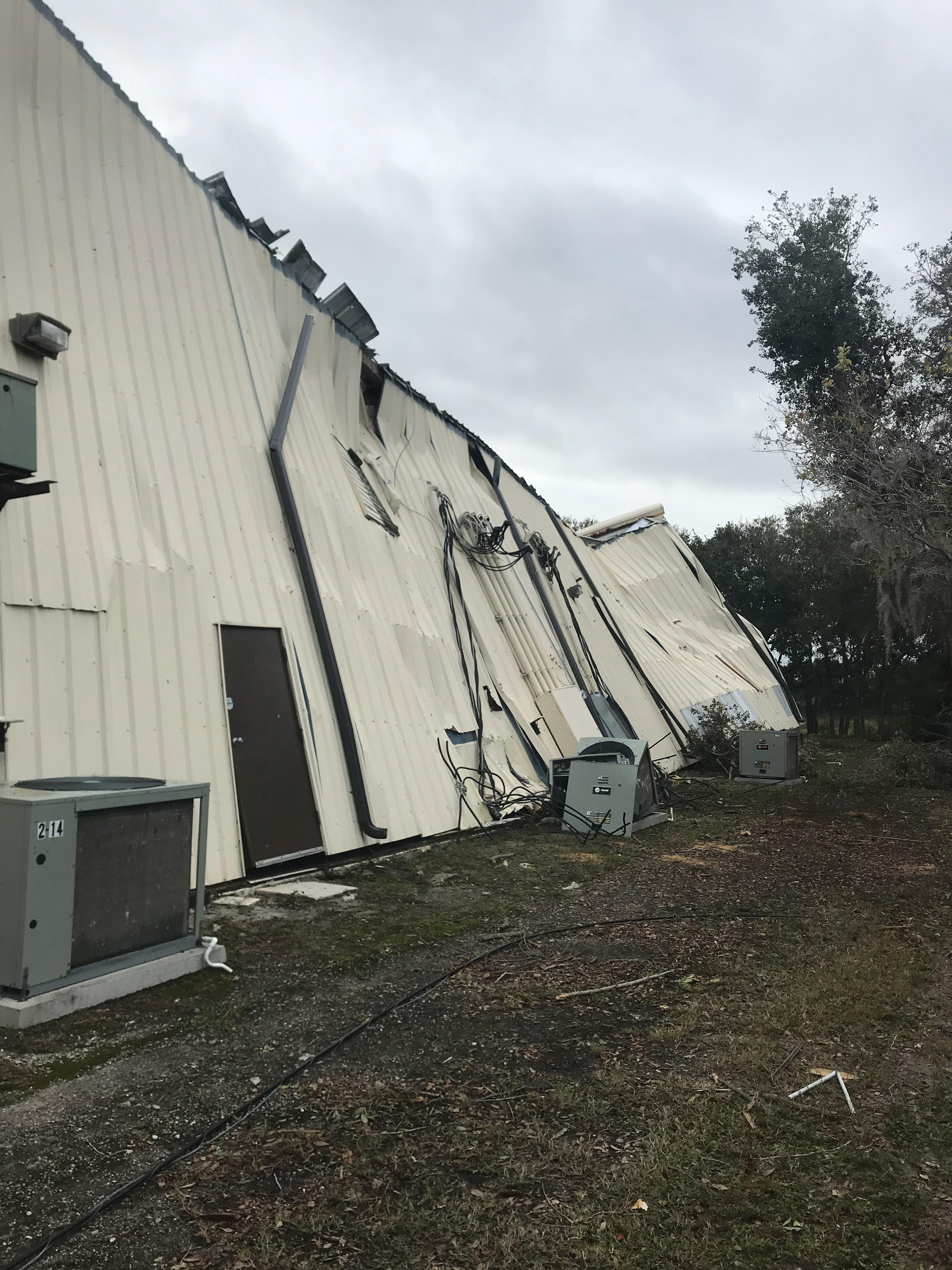
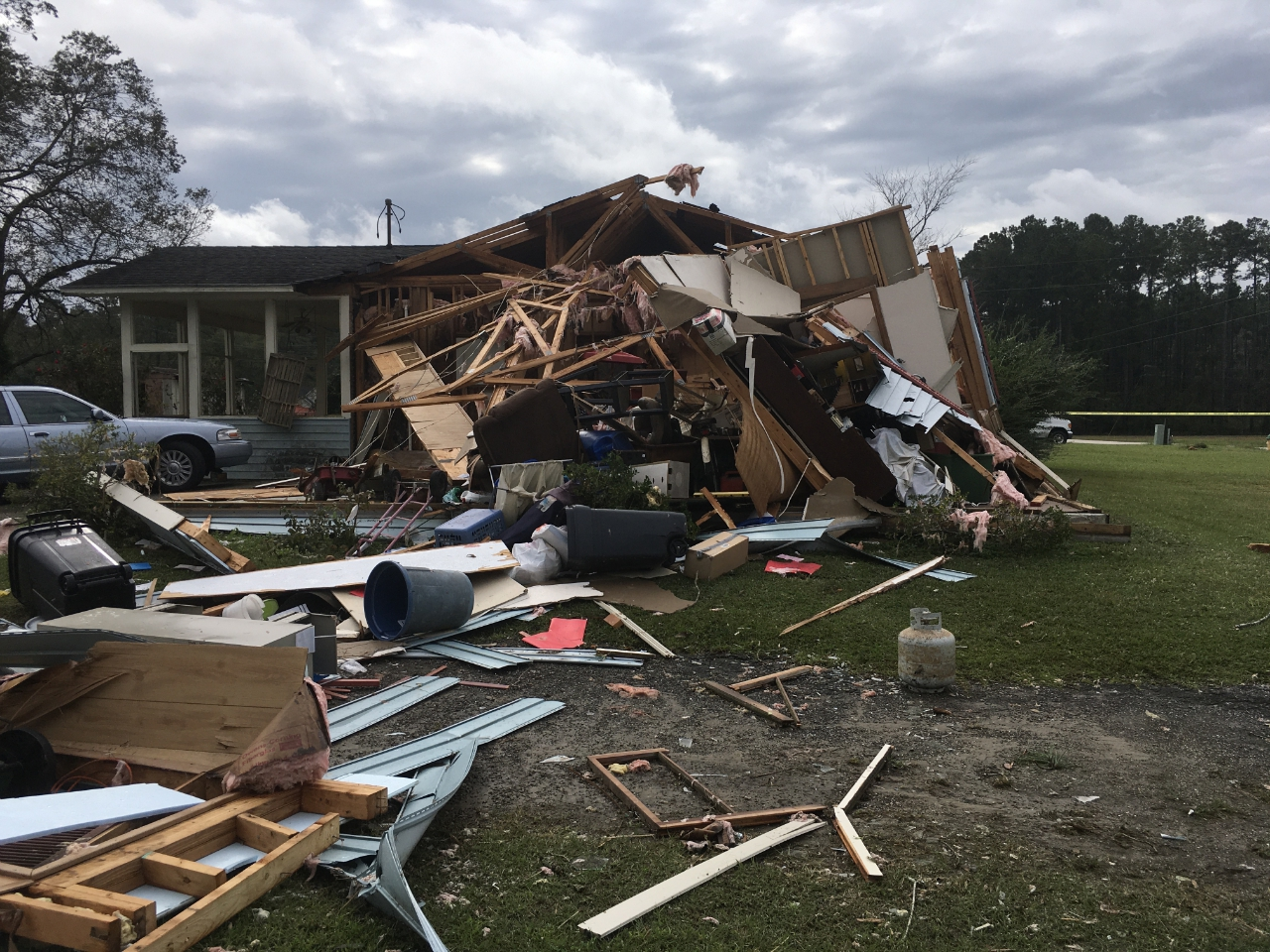
- Clockwise from top: The roof of an apartment building in Arlington, Texas torn off after an EF2 tornado on November 24; EF1 damage to a home after a tornado struck Conway, South Carolina on October 11; High-end EF2 damage to a building after a tornado struck Bardmoor, Florida on December 16.
- Timespan: October 7 – December 30
- Maximum rated tornado: EF2 tornado: Arlington, Texas on November 24; Bardmoor, Florida on December 16; Sandjack, Texas on December 23
- Tornadoes: 70
- Fatalities: 0
- Injuries: 12

This page documents confirmed tornadoes in October, November, and December 2020 via various weather forecast offices of the National Weather Service. Based on the 1991–2010 averaging period, 61 tornadoes occur across the United States throughout October, 58 through November, and 24 through December.

Similar to the previous two months, a large portion of the tornadoes that touched down in October were produced by tropical cyclones, although it was still well below average with only 19 tornadoes being confirmed with no significant (EF2+) tornadoes being confirmed. November saw one tropical tornado and only isolated to scattered activity occurred elsewhere, causing the month to also fall significantly below average with only 24 tornadoes. December tornado activity did not start until about midway through the month, but a small outbreak did occur between December 23–24. There were 27 tornadoes during the month, which was comparable to the average.

== United States yearly total ==
Confirmed tornadoes by Enhanced Fujita rating
EFU	EF0	EF1	EF2	EF3	EF4	EF5	Total
109	443	421	89	18	6	0	1,086

== October ==
Confirmed tornadoes by Enhanced Fujita rating
EFU	EF0	EF1	EF2	EF3	EF4	EF5	Total
1	12	6	0	0	0	0	19

=== October 7 event ===
List of confirmed tornadoes – Wednesday, October 7, 2020 (Note: All dates are based on the local time zone where the tornado touched down; however, all times are in Coordinated Universal Time for consistency.)
EF#	Location	County / Parish	State	Start Coord.	Time (UTC)	Path length	Max width
EF0	W of Canajoharie	Montgomery	NY	42.9012°N 74.6256°W	19:14–19:15	0.11 mi (0.18 km)	20 yd (18 m)
EF0	A very brief tornado formed within a squall line. It destroyed a barn, with metal siding strewn about the property, and toppled a tree.						
EF0	Millis	Norfolk	MA	42.1842°N 71.3733°W	21:50–21:51	0.53 mi (0.85 km)	50 yd (46 m)
EF0	A very brief tornado formed within a squall line. A metal lamp post was blown down. Trees were snapped or uprooted.						

=== October 9 event ===
Event was associated with Hurricane Delta.

List of confirmed tornadoes – Friday, October 9, 2020
EF#	Location	County / Parish	State	Start Coord.	Time (UTC)	Path length	Max width
EF0	SSW of McCall Creek	Franklin	MS	31.4343°N 90.7235°W	21:34–21:35	0.73 mi (1.17 km)	100 yd (91 m)
EF0	Several trees were snapped or uprooted near a home.						

=== October 10 event ===
Events in the Southeastern U.S. were associated with Hurricane Delta.

List of confirmed tornadoes – Saturday, October 10, 2020
EF#	Location	County / Parish	State	Start Coord.	Time (UTC)	Path length	Max width
EF0	SSE of St. Elmo	Mobile	AL	30.4803°N 88.2508°W	10:01–10:02	0.08 mi (0.13 km)	25 yd (23 m)
EF0	A very brief tornado uprooted and snapped several trees.						
EF1	SSW of Amanda Park	Grays Harbor	WA	47.3688°N 123.9473°W	11:40–11:42	0.50 mi (0.80 km)	30 yd (27 m)
EF1	Hardwood and softwood trees 1–2.5 feet (30–75 cm) in diameter were snapped at the trunk.						
EF1	Covington	Newton	GA	33.587°N 83.877°W	20:34–20:44	1.44 mi (2.32 km)	75 yd (69 m)
EF1	Tree and structural damage occurred along the path. The worst damage was to a homeless shelter, where the roof and walls were damaged. Two people suffered minor injuries.						
EF0	NE of LaFayette	Chambers	AL	32.9462°N 85.3531°W	21:14–21:16	0.67 mi (1.08 km)	125 yd (114 m)
EF0	A brief tornado snapped or uprooted several trees.						
EF0	SW of Newnan	Coweta	GA	33.365°N 84.811°W	22:12–22:13	0.35 mi (0.56 km)	90 yd (82 m)
EF0	A portion of the roof at Newnan High School was damaged. Some tree damage also occurred.						
EF0	N of Newnan	Coweta	GA	33.402°N 84.793°W	22:18–22:21	0.96 mi (1.54 km)	90 yd (82 m)
EF0	Trees were damaged or uprooted.						
EF0	NE of Concord	Pike	GA	33.1031°N 84.4262°W	22:27–22:32	2.13 mi (3.43 km)	200 yd (180 m)
EF0	Multiple trees were snapped and uprooted, with most of the damage to pine trees.						
EF0	ESE of Morrow	Clayton	GA	33.5640°N 84.3056°W	23:45–23:46	0.56 mi (0.90 km)	150 yd (140 m)
EF0	A few trees were snapped and a house lost some roofing material and siding.						
EF0	SW of Stone Mountain	DeKalb	GA	33.7263°N 84.2122°W	00:16–00:20	1.68 mi (2.70 km)	250 yd (230 m)
EF0	Trees were snapped and uprooted with some falling on homes and power lines. Shingles were pulled from a few roofs.						
EF0	ENE of Lilburn	Gwinnett	GA	33.9028°N 84.0983°W	00:43–00:46	0.66 mi (1.06 km)	200 yd (180 m)
EF0	A short-lived tornado snapped and uprooted trees. Some trees fell on homes but did not cause major damage.						

=== October 11 event ===
Events were associated with Hurricane Delta.

List of confirmed tornadoes – Sunday, October 11, 2020
EF#	Location	County / Parish	State	Start Coord.	Time (UTC)	Path length	Max width
EF1	NW of Latta	Dillon	SC	34.3643°N 79.5002°W	19:20–19:21	0.5 mi (0.80 km)	40 yd (37 m)
EF1	As the tornado crossed I-95, it snapped several pine trees, damaged a billboard, and destroyed a storage shed. A single-wide mobile home had minor damage, and another home had a portion of its metal roofing peeled off.						
EF1	NNW of Conway	Horry	SC	33.8767°N 79.0725°W	20:19–20:20	0.3 mi (0.48 km)	30 yd (27 m)
EF1	One person was injured. One home was significantly damaged. Minor damage was done to an adjacent home and a storage building. An old barn was considerably damaged. Several trees were snapped or uprooted.						
EF0	Red Hill to E of Wilson Landing	Horry	SC	33.8148°N 79.0196°W	20:31	2.27 mi (3.65 km)	20 yd (18 m)
EF0	Some scattered damage was done to large tree limbs, and a sign was knocked down on US 501. More damage to trees was done along the path before lifting.						
EF1	SE of Nakina to Old Dock	Columbus	NC	34.1129°N 78.6586°W	21:51–22:06	5.49 mi (8.84 km)	30 yd (27 m)
EF1	A home had minor roof and carport damage on NC 905 as it paralleled the highway. It damaged an outbuilding later down the path before lifting just east of NC 130.						

=== October 23 event ===
List of confirmed tornadoes – Friday, October 23, 2020
EF#	Location	County / Parish	State	Start Coord.	Time (UTC)	Path length	Max width
EFU	NNW of Lowes	Graves	KY	36.9407°N 88.7891°W	20:18–20:19	0.35 mi (0.56 km)	30 yd (27 m)
EFU	No damage was found.						

=== October 28 event ===
Event was associated with Hurricane Zeta.

List of confirmed tornadoes – Wednesday, October 28, 2020
EF#	Location	County / Parish	State	Start Coord.	Time (UTC)	Path length	Max width
EF1	ENE of Macon to ESE of Brooksville	Noxubee	MS	33.1392°N 88.5032°W	23:09–23:19	5 mi (8.0 km)	150 yd (140 m)
EF1	As the tornado touched down, it snapped several pine trees and large tree limbs. It produced minor tree damage as it moved north. It continued to snap and uproot trees before it damaged the roofing of two homes. A shed was heavily damaged with its roof torn off and several walls missing. Another shed had minor siding damage. Two power poles were snapped along with more trees. Tin debris was thrown across a field before the tornado lifted.						

== November ==
Confirmed tornadoes by Enhanced Fujita rating
EFU	EF0	EF1	EF2	EF3	EF4	EF5	Total
1	8	14	1	0	0	0	24

=== November 10 event ===
List of confirmed tornadoes – Tuesday, November 10, 2020
EF#	Location	County / Parish	State	Start Coord.	Time (UTC)	Path length	Max width
EF1	SSW of Joy to SSW of Taylor Ridge	Mercer, Rock Island	IL	41.1699°N 90.8965°W	19:45–20:07	20.34 mi (32.73 km)	50 yd (46 m)
EF1	An intermittent tornado destroyed an outbuilding. Occasional tree damage was found along the path.						
EF1	W of Burgess	Mercer	IL	41.1233°N 90.6691°W	20:02–20:03	0.54 mi (0.87 km)	30 yd (27 m)
EF1	This brief tornado destroyed an old barn.						
EF0	W of Saint Helens	Columbia	OR	45.86°N 122.85°W	20:20–20:26	1.7 mi (2.7 km)	200 yd (180 m)
EF0	Four houses suffered minor damage to shingles and to one porch. Several trees were snapped and numerous branches were knocked down. Some branches struck power lines, causing power outages.						
EF1	SSE of Albany	Whiteside	IL	41.7506°N 90.2019°W	20:38–20:39	0.26 mi (0.42 km)	100 yd (91 m)
EF1	A roof was blown off a barn into a field.						
EF1	WSW of Atkinson	Henry	IL	41.4094°N 90.0609°W	20:42–20:43	0.32 mi (0.51 km)	30 yd (27 m)
EF1	The roof of a large outbuilding was significantly damaged. Debris from the roof was scattered over 0.25 mi (0.40 km) away to the northeast.						
EF1	NE of Lyndon to E of Round Grove	Whiteside	IL	41.7479°N 89.8849°W	20:50–20:53	3.47 mi (5.58 km)	100 yd (91 m)
EF1	The roof of a large hog building was significantly damaged. Sporadic tree damage occurred along the path.						
EF1	W of Malvern to W of Coleta	Whiteside	IL	41.8512°N 89.9391°W	21:00–21:07	4.28 mi (6.89 km)	100 yd (91 m)
EF1	One outbuilding was completely destroyed. The roof of a barn was damaged. Soft pine trees were snapped, and some tree limbs were downed.						
EF0	NW of Somonauk to E of Hinckley	DeKalb	IL	41.67°N 88.75°W	22:19–22:31	9.99 mi (16.08 km)	50 yd (46 m)
EF0	A grain silo was damaged. Damaged trees and power lines were found along the path.						
EF0	NW of Elburn to Lily Lake	Kane	IL	41.91°N 88.53°W	22:39–22:42	3.72 mi (5.99 km)	50 yd (46 m)
EF0	As the tornado touched down, it damaged trees and the roof of an outbuilding. The tornado crossed IL-47 according to an eyewitness. The tornado lifted just north of IL-64 after crossing it as well. A weak tornado debris signature was also observed with this tornado.						

=== November 11 event ===
Event was associated with Hurricane Eta.

List of confirmed tornadoes – Wednesday, November 11, 2020
EF#	Location	County / Parish	State	Start Coord.	Time (UTC)	Path length	Max width
EF0	NNW of Verna	Manatee	FL	27.43°N 82.3°W	17:18–17:28	0.36 mi (0.58 km)	100 yd (91 m)
EF0	A brief tornado damaged the porch of a home.						

=== November 15 event ===
List of confirmed tornadoes – Sunday, November 15, 2020
EF#	Location	County / Parish	State	Start Coord.	Time (UTC)	Path length	Max width
EF1	S of Romance	White	AR	35.2191°N 92.0579°W	07:15–07:17	2 mi (3.2 km)	150 yd (140 m)
EF1	Four people were injured. A mobile home was rolled, while another mobile home was severely damaged. A third mobile home was pushed off its block foundation. A fourth and final mobile home had roof damage. Several trees were snapped or uprooted.						

=== November 18 event ===
List of confirmed tornadoes – Wednesday, November 18, 2020
EF#	Location	County / Parish	State	Start Coord.	Time (UTC)	Path length	Max width
EF0	WSW of Big Bend	Butte	CA	39.65°N 121.56°W	21:55–22:15	0.47 mi (0.76 km)	3 yd (2.7 m)
EF0	A car was flipped, a chain link fence was pushed over, a large tree was uprooted, and multiple tree branches were snapped.						
EF0	E of Clarksville	El Dorado	CA	38.63°N 121.00°W	23:30–23:50	4.39 mi (7.07 km)	2 yd (1.8 m)
EF0	A brief tornado was caught on a live webcam. No damage was found.						

=== November 24 event ===
List of confirmed tornadoes – Tuesday, November 24, 2020
EF#	Location	County / Parish	State	Start Coord.	Time (UTC)	Path length	Max width
EF2	Arlington	Tarrant	TX	32.692°N 97.1472°W	02:51–02:58	5.05 mi (8.13 km)	150 yd (140 m)
EF2	Businesses, restaurants, homes, fences, trees and warehouses in Arlington were damaged by this low-end EF2 tornado, which was embedded within a line of severe thunderstorms. Large sections of roof were ripped off an apartment complex, where the tornado reached its peak strength. Five people were injured, and no tornado warning was issued until after the tornado had dissipated.						
EF1	W of Kinta	Haskell	OK	35.104°N 95.316°W	02:54–02:59	3 mi (4.8 km)	200 yd (180 m)
EF1	A mobile home was destroyed. The roofs of a couple homes were damaged. Power poles and tree limbs were snapped.						
EF1	NE of Spiro to SE of Fort Coffee	LeFlore	OK	35.258°N 94.609°W	03:50–03:57	4 mi (6.4 km)	250 yd (230 m)
EF1	A barn was damaged. Several trees were uprooted.						

=== November 25 event ===
List of confirmed tornadoes – Wednesday, November 25, 2020
EF#	Location	County / Parish	State	Start Coord.	Time (UTC)	Path length	Max width
EF1	S of Deadwood	Panola	TX	32.0795°N 94.1294°W	07:51–07:52	0.36 mi (0.58 km)	75 yd (69 m)
EF1	Trees were snapped or uprooted. No structural damage occurred.						
EF1	WNW of Jackson	Hinds	MS	32.3304°N 90.2593°W	13:21–13:23	0.74 mi (1.19 km)	175 yd (160 m)
EF1	Several trees were blown down, some onto homes. Some minor structural damage occurred along the path.						

=== November 27 event ===
List of confirmed tornadoes – Friday, November 27, 2020
EF#	Location	County / Parish	State	Start Coord.	Time (UTC)	Path length	Max width
EF1	SW of McComb	Pike	MS	31.1716°N 90.5012°W	20:57–21:04	2.0 mi (3.2 km)	50 yd (46 m)
EF1	A strapped-down mobile home was lifted and rolled upside-down, with its walls crushed. The straps of another mobile home were broken. An anchored airplane was flipped and a nearby hangar and office building were damaged. A road sign was blown down. Trees were uprooted and snapped and tree limbs were broken.						

=== November 30 event ===
List of confirmed tornadoes – Monday, November 30, 2020
EF#	Location	County / Parish	State	Start Coord.	Time (UTC)	Path length	Max width	Summary
EF1	NNW of Hamburg to SE of Nankin	Madison	FL	30.5923°N 83.5222°W	08:10–08:18	5.52 mi (8.88 km)	475 yd (434 m)	Significant tree damage and minor damage to a home occurred near where this tornado touched down. The tornado was at its strongest and its widest point as it continued to significantly damage trees, and cause damage to multiple farm outbuildings. As the tornado narrowed, it snapped many pine trees. The tornado lifted near SR 53, just south of the Florida/Georgia state border.
EFU	East Lake to NE of Odessa	Pinellas, Hillsborough, Pasco	FL	28.1°N 82.69°W	11:00–11:25	12.45 mi (20.04 km)	50 yd (46 m)	Despite this tornado touching down intermittently for over 12 mi (19 km), only damage reported was downed tree limbs and blown around patio furniture.
EF1	E of Port Deposit to Woodlawn	Cecil	MD	39.644°N 76.063°W	19:37–19:42	3.36 mi (5.41 km)	75 yd (69 m)	Many trees were snapped or uprooted at the beginning of the path, including some near a home. As the tornado moved northeast, it damaged newly installed power poles near another home. Additional trees and power poles were damaged. The tornado was at its strongest point when a front porch awning was lifted. Damage to other homes occurred, including damage to roof shingles and siding. One home's garage door was bent inward. Trees were snapped or uprooted along the rest of the path before the tornado lifted.
EF0	NNW of Baltimore Corner to SW of Templeville	Caroline	MD	39.0675°N 75.8520°W	20:13–20:20	5.32 mi (8.56 km)	75 yd (69 m)	This tornado first touched down along MD 313, just south of the Caroline/Queen Anne's county border. Little to no damage was found in this area, however, a small tornado debris signature appeared on doppler radar. As this tornado moved northeastward, it passed northwest of Henderson. In this area, a small horse barn was destroyed, with its walls collapsed, and its roof blown across a yard into a nearby home. The nearby home had damage done to its roof, siding, and chimney. Several trees and tree branches were snapped or uprooted. Later on down the path, two barns were destroyed. One of the barns' roofs was lifted and tossed, while the other was peeled and twisted. The tornado continued northeast before lifting.
EF0	Montgomeryville	Montgomery	PA	40.23°N 75.24°W	20:52–20:53	0.87 mi (1.40 km)	100 yd (91 m)	A brief tornado touched down just east of the PA 309 northbound onramp to the US 202 parkway. As the tornado crossed the US 202 parkway, two small trees were uprooted. Wooden picnic tables outside of a Texas Roadhouse were tossed, shattering the front window of a nearby closed restaurant. This same restaurant had air-handling equipment and siding torn from the building. Six to eight cars in the parking lots of both the Texas Roadhouse and the nearby restaurant were either shaken or tossed by the tornado. Several small tree branches were snapped in the area. Metal light posts were bent at the base, and two stop signs were either bent over or removed from the ground. A supporting pole at the entrance of a nearby Staybridge Suites was damaged. The tornado inflicted minor damage to roofing at a Costco before lifting less than one minute after it touched down.

== December ==
Confirmed tornadoes by Enhanced Fujita rating
EFU	EF0	EF1	EF2	EF3	EF4	EF5	Total
0	11	14	2	0	0	0	27

=== December 13 event ===
List of confirmed tornadoes – Sunday, December 13, 2020
EF#	Location	County / Parish	State	Start Coord.	Time (UTC)	Path length	Max width
EF1	W of Morrow	St. Landry	LA	30.8218°N 92.1309°W	00:35–00:37	1.07 mi (1.72 km)	106 yd (97 m)
EF1	The tornado stayed mainly over open rice fields, but a few trees were damaged.						

=== December 14 event ===
List of confirmed tornadoes – Monday, December 14, 2020
EF#	Location	County / Parish	State	Start Coord.	Time (UTC)	Path length	Max width
EF0	ESE of Bessemer to SSE of Ross Bridge	Jefferson	AL	33.3636°N 86.9426°W	07:02–07:08	4.8 mi (7.7 km)	350 yd (320 m)
EF0	Many trees were uprooted or snapped, some landing on homes and vehicles. The tornado was at its widest point as it crossed SR 150.						

=== December 16 event ===
List of confirmed tornadoes – Wednesday, December 16, 2020
EF#	Location	County / Parish	State	Start Coord.	Time (UTC)	Path length	Max width	Summary
EF2	NE of Seminole to SSW of Tampa International Airport	Pinellas, Hillsborough	FL	27.8637°N 82.7524°W	20:49-21:11	13.1 mi (21.1 km)	300 yd (270 m)	Two buildings were destroyed, and five had major damage. At a boat storage facility, 2-ton boats were tossed, and the buildings they were housed in had major damage. As the tornado approached US 19, damage became spottier. Insulation from buildings collected along a fence near the St. Pete–Clearwater International Airport. The tornado crossed I-275 on the Howard Frankland Bridge. Video from social media showed the tornado bending a light pole. Damage was $16 million.
EF1	N of Plant City to Gibsonia	Hillsborough, Polk	FL	28.061°N 82.1662°W	21:53-22:15	12.9 mi (20.8 km)	250 yd (230 m)	A home was damaged in North Lakeland, just north of Lake Gibson. Two small barns were destroyed. Video posted on social media of this tornado showed the tornado as a "wedge". Most damage was done to trees as the tornado's rotation stayed elevated for most of its path. Damage was $280,000.

=== December 23 event ===
List of confirmed tornadoes – Wednesday, December 23, 2020
EF#	Location	County / Parish	State	Start Coord.	Time (UTC)	Path length	Max width
EF2	SW of Bon Wier	Newton	TX	30.6341°N 93.7149°W	21:54–21:56	1.23 mi (1.98 km)	20 yd (18 m)
EF2	A brief but strong tornado tore a large section of roofing off of a home, and a barn lost its roof entirely. Several trees were uprooted or snapped.						
EF1	Kirbyville	Jasper	TX	30.6649°N 93.9058°W	00:59–01:00	0.39 mi (0.63 km)	45 yd (41 m)
EF1	A brief tornado tipped over a car, tore roofing shingles off of homes in town, and snapped or uprooted trees.						
EF0	SSE of Fugate	Yazoo	MS	32.7076°N 90.1827°W	04:26–04:27	0.72 mi (1.16 km)	50 yd (46 m)
EF0	Several trees were downed.						
EF0	N of Canton	Madison	MS	32.7295°N 90.0465°W	04:40–04:41	0.9 mi (1.4 km)	50 yd (46 m)
EF0	Several trees were downed, and tree limbs were snapped off.						
EF1	N of Bude	Franklin	MS	31.5573°N 90.8446°W	05:17–05:18	1.08 mi (1.74 km)	150 yd (140 m)
EF1	Trees were snapped or uprooted in the community of New Hope. The tornado lifted in the Homochitto National Forest.						
EF1	N of McCall Creek	Franklin	MS	31.5714°N 90.7532°W	05:24–05:30	5.06 mi (8.14 km)	250 yd (230 m)
EF1	Numerous trees were snapped or uprooted in the Homochitto National Forest.						
EF0	N of Williams	Franklin, Lincoln	MS	31.5827°N 90.642°W	05:31–05:33	1.72 mi (2.77 km)	200 yd (180 m)
EF0	A mobile home's roof was damaged. Multiple trees were snapped or uprooted.						
EF0	N of Williams to NW of Zetus	Lincoln	MS	31.6242°N 90.61°W	05:36–05:40	3.44 mi (5.54 km)	100 yd (91 m)
EF0	Multiple trees were uprooted.						
EF0	NW of Zetus to NW of Brookhaven	Lincoln	MS	31.617°N 90.5478°W	05:41–05:45	4.12 mi (6.63 km)	150 yd (140 m)
EF0	A couple of outbuildings were damaged just south of State Highway 550. Later on, a mobile home, and additional outbuildings were damaged near the highway. Trees were downed along the path.						
EF1	S of Wesson	Lincoln	MS	31.6596°N 90.4146°W	05:51–05:53	1.9 mi (3.1 km)	880 yd (800 m)
EF1	A large, high-end EF1 tornado snapped or uprooted numerous trees and knocked over a power pole.						

=== December 24 event ===
List of confirmed tornadoes – Thursday, December 24, 2020
EF#	Location	County / Parish	State	Start Coord.	Time (UTC)	Path length	Max width
EF0	Prentiss	Jefferson Davis	MS	31.6123°N 89.8707°W	06:25–06:33	1.98 mi (3.19 km)	400 yd (370 m)
EF0	A small shed lost its whole roof, while another shed lost some roofing. Trees and tree limbs were downed.						
EF1	SW of Taylorsville	Covington	MS	31.7838°N 89.5077°W	07:02–07:06	3.28 mi (5.28 km)	100 yd (91 m)
EF1	Two homes lost roof shingles, a fence was blown over, and several trees were snapped or uprooted.						
EF0	Taylorsville	Smith	MS	31.8300°N 89.4293°W	07:07–07:11	3.37 mi (5.42 km)	50 yd (46 m)
EF0	This tornado touched down in the downtown area of Taylorsville, downing a utility pole, which had sheet metal wrapped around it. Multiple trees were snapped or uprooted elsewhere along the path.						
EF0	N of Soso to SSE of Bay Springs	Jasper	MS	31.8667°N 89.2909°W	07:17–07:20	2.66 mi (4.28 km)	25 yd (23 m)
EF0	Two homes had roof shingle damage, tree limbs were snapped, and some trees were snapped or uprooted.						
EF1	Waldrup	Jasper	MS	31.9595°N 89.1579°W	07:26–07:33	3.89 mi (6.26 km)	550 yd (500 m)
EF1	The roof of a garage was ripped off, a glass door was blown off its hinges, and the front brick wall of the garage was severely damaged. An old gas station lost roofing shingles, with some evidence of roof lifting. Several sheds in the community of Waldrup had their tin roofs peeled back. A chicken house was significantly damaged. Many trees were snapped or uprooted.						
EF0	NE of Chadbourn	Columbus	NC	34.3883°N 78.7795°W	17:16–17:17	0.14 mi (0.23 km)	20 yd (18 m)
EF0	Several tree tops were broken, and other trees had large branches snapped off and thrown.						
EF1	NNW of Hampton to SE of Starke	Bradford	FL	29.8855°N 82.1426°W	23:16–23:23	4.12 mi (6.63 km)	100 yd (91 m)
EF1	Roofs of manufactured homes, fences, and trees were damaged. Two people were taken to a hospital as a precaution, but they were later released.						
EF1	N of Fruit Cove	Duval	FL	30.1706°N 81.6453°W	23:45–23:48	0.87 mi (1.40 km)	60 yd (55 m)
EF1	Trees were snapped or uprooted. One tree fell on a home, causing minor roof damage. Another tree fell onto a power transformer, causing it to blow out and ignite the tree on fire.						
EF1	SSW of University of North Florida	Duval	FL	30.2142°N 81.5427°W	23:54–23:59	0.6 mi (0.97 km)	100 yd (91 m)
EF1	Only trees were damaged.						
EF1	SE of Manning	Clarendon	SC	33.6108°N 80.1438°W	00:30–00:31	0.32 mi (0.51 km)	50 yd (46 m)
EF1	Near the Baggette Crossroads area, thin pieces of metal roofing were torn off a church, and the eastern wall of the fellowship hall collapsed. Debris from the church was carried up to 0.6 mi (0.97 km) away. Numerous pine trees were snapped or uprooted.						
EF1	SW of Suffolk	City of Suffolk	VA	36.5829°N 76.8305°W	04:21–04:22	0.3 mi (0.48 km)	150 yd (140 m)
EF1	This brief tornado occurred over a rural area southwest of the actual city of Suffolk. A home sustained significant damage, a pickup truck was flipped over, and several trees were snapped or uprooted.						
EF1	SW of Suffolk	City of Suffolk	VA	36.6549°N 76.7563°W	04:28–04:31	2.2 mi (3.5 km)	200 yd (180 m)
EF1	This tornado followed the previous one, touching down to the northeast of where the previous one lifted. Six homes sustained significant damage, including shingles being torn off, and a large trailer was damaged. Several large trees were uprooted as well.						

=== December 30 event ===
List of confirmed tornadoes – Wednesday, December 30, 2020
EF#	Location	County / Parish	State	Start Coord.	Time (UTC)	Path length	Max width
EF0	Corsicana	Navarro	TX	32.0722°N 96.4824°W	16:41–16:44	0.98 mi (1.58 km)	75 yd (69 m)
EF0	This tornado first touched down at a sports complex, causing damage to a concession/storage building, awnings, fencing, and signs. A light pole was downed in this area as well. After the tornado moved through a wooded area, it hit a trailer park, damaging at least 13 manufactured and frame-built homes. A few mobile homes had their roofs completely removed, and large tree branches were snapped. The tornado lifted shortly thereafter.						

== See also ==
- Tornadoes of 2020
- List of United States tornadoes from August to September 2020
- List of United States tornadoes from January to March 2021
