= Reitz (surname) =

Reitz is a surname of German origin. Notable people with the surname include:

- Christopher Reitz (born 1973), German field hockey goalkeeper
- Curtis R. Reitz (1929–2025), American academic, scholar of criminal law
- Deneys Reitz (1882–1944), South African writer and statesman
- Don Reitz (1929–2014), American ceramic artist
- Edgar Reitz (born 1932), German filmmaker
- Erik Reitz (born 1982), ice hockey player
- Francis Reitz (disambiguation), several people
- Gijs Bosch Reitz (1860–1938), Dutch painter
- Hans Walter Reitz (1888–1955), German architect of New Objectivity (architecture)
- Heinie Reitz (1867–1914), American baseball player
- Heinrich Reitz, German rugby union international
- J. Wayne Reitz (1908–1993), fifth president of the University of Florida (1955–1967)
- Joe Reitz (born 1985), National Football League player for the Indianapolis Colts
- Karl Reitz (1887–1943), German musician, also refer to Busch Quartet and August Heinrich Bruinier
- Ken Reitz (1951–2021), Major League Baseball player
- Rosetta Reitz (1924–2008), American feminist, jazz historian and music producer
