= Lincoln, Minnesota =

- Unincorporated community
- Location within Minnesota Location within the United States
- Coordinates: 46°12′37″N 94°38′27″W
- Country: United States
- State: Minnesota
- County: Morrison
- Township: Scandia Valley
- Elevation: 1,280 ft (390 m)
- Time zone: UTC-6 (Central (CST))
  - Summer (DST): UTC-5 (CDT)
- ZIP code: 56443 and 56466
- Area code: 218
- GNIS feature ID: 646670

Lincoln is an unincorporated community in Scandia Valley Township, Morrison County, Minnesota, United States. The community is located along U.S. Highway 10 near Holt Road. 320th Street and Azure Road are also in the immediate area. Nearby places include Motley, Cushing, and Little Falls.

== History ==
Lincoln was platted in 1893, and named for Abraham Lincoln, 16th President of the United States. A post office was established at Lincoln in 1890, and remained in operation until 1954.

== Transportation ==
Amtrak’s Empire Builder, which operates between Seattle/Portland and Chicago, passes through the small town on BNSF tracks, but makes no stop. The nearest station is located in Staples, 15 miles (24 km) to the northwest.
