= Huntington Lake, California =

Unincorporated community in California, United States

Huntington Lake
- Unincorporated community
- Location in California Huntington Lake (the United States)
- Coordinates: 37°13′54″N 119°14′09″W
- Country: United States
- State: California
- County: Fresno
- Continent: North America
- Elevation: 7,028 ft (2,142 m)

Huntington Lake (formerly Basin) is an unincorporated community in Fresno County, California, United States. It is located on the western end of Huntington Lake, 2 miles (3.2 km) north of Big Creek, at an elevation of 7027 feet (2142 m).

The Basin post office opened in 1913; the name was changed to Huntington Lake in 1916. Huntington Lake is a community of USFS Recreation Residences.

== Climate ==
This region experiences warm (but not hot) and dry summers, with no average monthly temperatures above 71.6 °F (22.0 °C). Summers typically feature warm daytime temperatures between 75 and 85 °F (24 and 29 °C), and can occasionally top 90 °F (32 °C). Lake breezes are common, which can help temper the warm daytime temperatures. Due to Huntington Lake's elevation, nighttime temperatures are significantly cooler than daytime temperatures, with low temperatures ranging between 40 and 50 °F (4 and 10 °C). Most summer days start off clear and cool, with afternoon thunderstorms occurring on most summer afternoons. These storms can occasionally produce hail and even snow. Winters are cool and chilly but average monthly temperatures typically remain at or above freezing. Snow is common in winter and averages around 234 inches (5,900 mm) of snow per year. According to the Köppen Climate Classification system, Huntington Lake has a warm-summer Mediterranean climate, abbreviated "Csb" on climate maps.

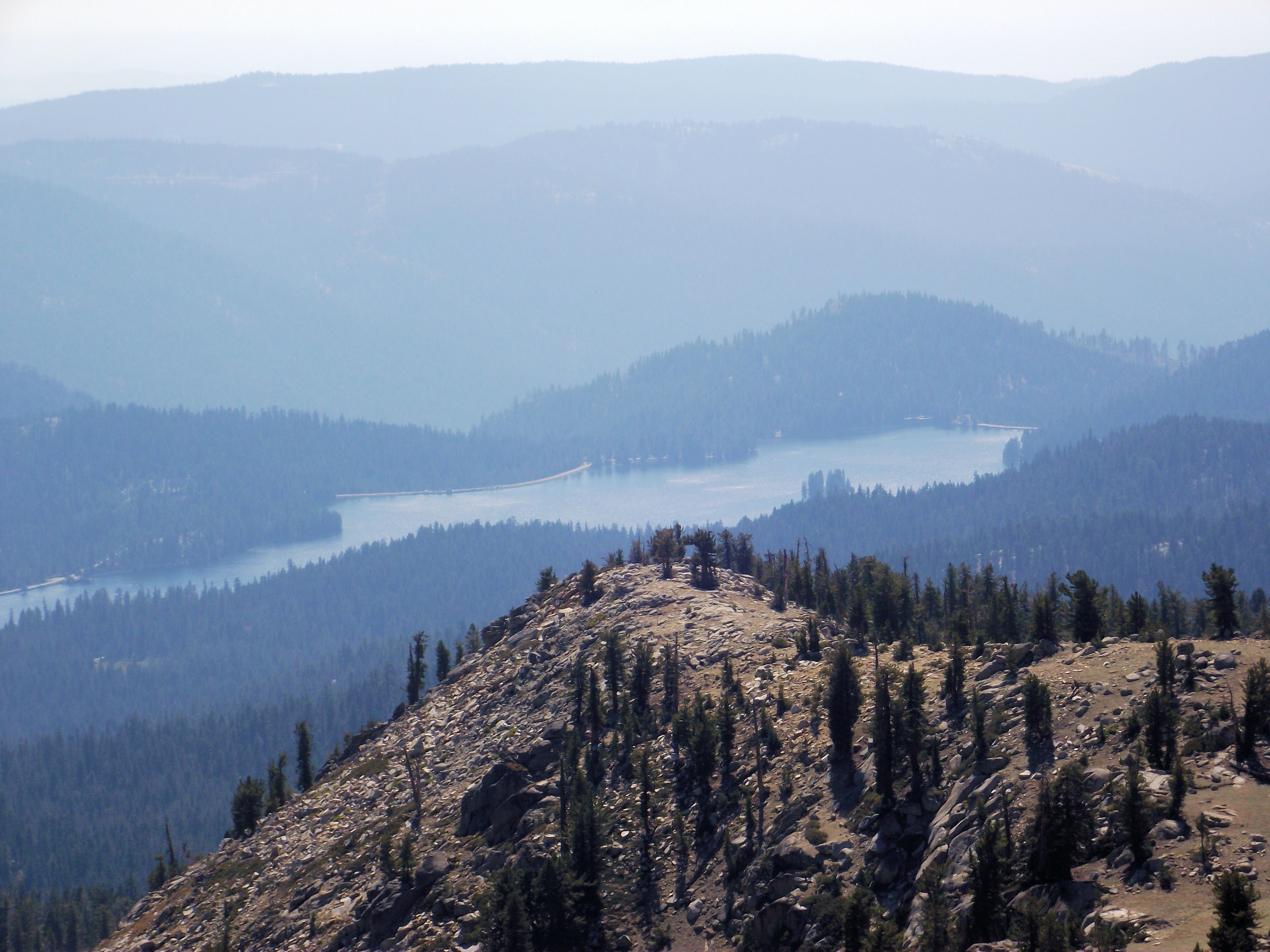
Kaiser Peak overlooks Huntington Lake in California. This photo is looking southwest from the peak. The peak has an elevation of 9,865 feet. The lake elevation when full is 6,949 feet.

Climate data for Huntington Lake, California, 1991–2020 normals, 1915–2010 extremes: 7020ft (2140m)
Month	Jan	Feb	Mar	Apr	May	Jun	Jul	Aug	Sep	Oct	Nov	Dec	Year
Record high °F (°C)	69 (21)	68 (20)	70 (21)	76 (24)	86 (30)	98 (37)	88 (31)	93 (34)	87 (31)	80 (27)	76 (24)	72 (22)	98 (37)
Mean maximum °F (°C)	58.3 (14.6)	58.1 (14.5)	59.3 (15.2)	65.3 (18.5)	71.3 (21.8)	77.1 (25.1)	82.8 (28.2)	82.2 (27.9)	78.9 (26.1)	70.9 (21.6)	63.5 (17.5)	58.0 (14.4)	83.4 (28.6)
Mean daily maximum °F (°C)	43.3 (6.3)	44.4 (6.9)	46.3 (7.9)	50.1 (10.1)	56.3 (13.5)	65.8 (18.8)	73.6 (23.1)	74.4 (23.6)	68.2 (20.1)	58.3 (14.6)	49.2 (9.6)	44.1 (6.7)	56.2 (13.4)
Daily mean °F (°C)	33.6 (0.9)	33.8 (1.0)	36.1 (2.3)	39.5 (4.2)	46.0 (7.8)	54.2 (12.3)	61.4 (16.3)	61.7 (16.5)	55.9 (13.3)	47.4 (8.6)	39.9 (4.4)	34.7 (1.5)	45.3 (7.4)
Mean daily minimum °F (°C)	23.9 (−4.5)	23.1 (−4.9)	25.9 (−3.4)	28.9 (−1.7)	35.8 (2.1)	42.5 (5.8)	49.1 (9.5)	49.0 (9.4)	43.7 (6.5)	36.5 (2.5)	30.5 (−0.8)	25.3 (−3.7)	34.5 (1.4)
Mean minimum °F (°C)	11.3 (−11.5)	11.3 (−11.5)	13.2 (−10.4)	18.0 (−7.8)	25.8 (−3.4)	32.7 (0.4)	41.0 (5.0)	41.9 (5.5)	34.9 (1.6)	27.1 (−2.7)	17.4 (−8.1)	13.6 (−10.2)	6.9 (−13.9)
Record low °F (°C)	−18 (−28)	−10 (−23)	−10 (−23)	−1 (−18)	6 (−14)	20 (−7)	31 (−1)	30 (−1)	24 (−4)	10 (−12)	1 (−17)	−9 (−23)	−18 (−28)
Average precipitation inches (mm)	8.47 (215)	7.80 (198)	6.80 (173)	4.02 (102)	2.42 (61)	0.71 (18)	0.66 (17)	0.10 (2.5)	0.40 (10)	2.29 (58)	3.92 (100)	6.82 (173)	44.41 (1,127.5)
Average snowfall inches (cm)	44.0 (112)	46.6 (118)	50.2 (128)	30.0 (76)	5.7 (14)	0.3 (0.76)	0.0 (0.0)	0.0 (0.0)	0.1 (0.25)	2.1 (5.3)	17.6 (45)	38.2 (97)	234.8 (596.31)
Average precipitation days (≥ 0.01 in)	10.8	11.9	9.9	8.6	6.3	2.1	1.9	0.5	1.8	4.4	7.6	10.1	75.9
Source 1: NOAA
Source 2: XMACIS2 (records, monthly max/mins & 1940-1980 snow)
