= Francis Reitz =

Francis Reitz may refer to:

- Francis Joseph Reitz (1841–1930), American banker from Indiana
  - FJ Reitz High School, founded in 1918
  - Reitz Memorial High School, founded in 1925
- Francis William Reitz (1844–1934), South African politician and son of below
- Francis William Reitz Sr. (1810–1881), South African politician and father of above
