= Reitz Lake =

Lake in the state of Minnesota, United States

- Location within Minnesota
- Location: Carver County, Minnesota
- Coordinates: 44°50′20″N 93°44′47″W
- Type: lake

Reitz Lake is a lake in Carver County, Minnesota, in the United States.

Reitz Lake was named for Frederick Reitz, a pioneer who settled there.

== See also ==
- List of lakes in Minnesota
