= Harrisburg High School (Arkansas) =

Location
- 501 West South Street; Harrisburg, Arkansas 72432; United States; 35°33′49″N 90°43′36″W

Information
- School type: Public comprehensive
- Motto: Think ~ Dream ~ Believe ~ Achieve
- Status: Open
- School district: Harrisburg School District
- CEEB code: 041020
- NCES School ID: 050735000447
- Teaching staff: 47.43 (on FTE basis)
- Grades: 6–12
- Enrollment: 523 (2023–2024)
- Student to teacher ratio: 11.03
- Education system: ADE Smart Core
- Classes offered: Regular, Advanced Placement (AP)
- Colors: Black and orange
- Athletics conference: 3A Region 3 (2012–14)
- Sports: American football, volleyball, bowling, golf, basketball, baseball, softball, tennis, track, cheer
- Mascot: Hornet
- Team name: Harrisburg Hornets
- Rival: Cross County
- Accreditation: ADE; AdvancED (1957–)
- Yearbook: The Hornet
- Communities served: Harrisburg, Weiner, Cherry Valley, Trumann
- Website: www.hbgsd.org

Harrisburg High School (HHS) is an accredited comprehensive public high school located in the city of Harrisburg, Arkansas, United States. The school provides secondary education for students in grades 9 through 12 serving all or portions of the communities of Harrisburg, Weiner, Cherry Valley and Trumann within Poinsett County, Arkansas, and is the only high school administered by the Harrisburg School District.

== History ==
In 2013, the Harrisburg school district closed Weiner High School, and students were moved to Harrisburg High.

== Demographics ==
Around 2013, before the consolidation of Weiner High, about 79% of Harrisburg High students received free or reduced lunches.

== Academics ==
Harrisburg High School is accredited by the Arkansas Department of Education (ADE) and has been accredited by AdvancED since 1957. The assumed course of study follows the Smart Core curriculum developed by the ADE. Students complete regular (core and elective) and career focus coursework and exams and may take Advanced Placement (AP) courses and exams with the opportunity to receive college credit.

== Academic performance ==
For the 2011–2012 school year, Weiner High School had higher high school level (grades 9–12) end-of-course examination scores in three of four subjects in most levels, except for grade 11, compared to Harrisburg High; Weiner High's grade 11 literacy scores were against that pattern.

Harrisburg High won the following "most improved" categories in the 2012 University of Arkansas Office of Educational Policy (OEP) awards for end of course examinations in grade 11 literacy: Top Five most improved high schools in Northeast Arkansas and Top 20 Most Improved High School. In addition, the OEP placed Harrisburg High as No. 2 on that year's list of schools with a low socioeconomic student body that performed strongly in the end of course algebra examinations.

== Athletics ==
The Harrisburg High School mascot and athletic emblem is the Hornet with black and orange as the school colors.

The Harrisburg Hornets compete in interscholastic activities within the 3A Classification via the 3A Region 3 Conference, as administered by the Arkansas Activities Association. The Hornets participate in American football, volleyball, bowling (boys/girls), golf (boys/girls), basketball (boys/girls), cheerleading, baseball, softball, tennis (boys/girls) and track and field (boys/girls).

The Harrisburg Lady Hornets volleyball teams have been one of the state's most successful with four state championships (1991, 1993, 1995, 1996).

In 2009, the Harrisburg cheer squad captured the 3A state championship in competitive cheer.

In 2022, Harrisburg cheer team won the grand championship at the 2022 Class "AA" State Cheer and Dance Competitions with 290 points, the event was held at the Watertown Civic Arena.
