= Area codes 870 and 327 =

Area code for eastern and southern Arkansas, United States

Coordinates: 34°12′N 92°00′W

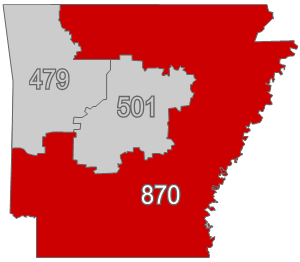

Area codes 870 and 327 are telephone area codes in the North American Numbering Plan (NANP) for southern, eastern, and most of northern Arkansas. 870 was created on April 14, 1997, in a split from area code 501, Arkansas's original area code of 1947, and 327 was added as part of an overlay complex in 2024.

== History ==
Area code 870 was first created in an area code split of 501, and comprises most of the state outside the Little Rock, Fort Smith, and Fayetteville/Springdale/Rogers areas. Major cities in the area include Jonesboro, Mountain Home, Pine Bluff, Texarkana, El Dorado, and West Memphis.

In 2009, the Arkansas Public Service Commission projected that the supply of unassigned telephone numbers for 870 would run out in 2013, prompting a December 2009 approval of an all-service overlay complex in this portion of the state. Area code 327 was assigned for this purpose in January 2010. The release of little-used central office codes and the nationwide introduction of number pooling delayed the exhaustion of the numbering pool and the relief action was indefinitely suspended in June 2012.

Per a 2021 NPA exhaust study by the North American Numbering Plan Administrator (NANPA), area code 870 is projected to exhaust in the first quarter of 2025. Area code 327, per the Arkansas Public Service Commission, has been selected and is in the network preparation phase for relief as an all-service overlay code for the 870 numbering plan area with a projected in-service date of February 20, 2024. Mandatory ten-digit dialing of area code 870 started on January 19, 2024.

In long-term planning, the NANPA projects a boundary elimination overlay involving all three Arkansas numbering plan areas (479, 501 and 870/327), resulting in a statewide overlay; details for such have not been released.

== Central office prefixes ==
NOTE: 976 is assigned to Jonesboro, and requires dialing 1-870 first.

Central office prefixes in area code 870
Prefix	Location	County	ZIP Code	Introduced
200	Nashville	Howard	71852	September 24, 2002
201	Newport	Jackson	72112	December 4, 2002
202	Pocahontas	Randolph	72455	December 4, 2002
203	Jonesboro	Craighead	72401	July 5, 2007
204	Harrison	Boone	72601	April 9, 2007
205	Paragould	Greene	72450	August 1, 2017
206	Jonesboro	Craighead	72401	October 25, 2011
207	Jonesboro	Craighead	72401	June 4, 2007
208	Wynne	Cross	72396	October 11, 1997
209	Pine Bluff	Jefferson	71601	January 25, 1998
210	Arkadelphia	Clark	71923	May 8, 2001
212	Paragould	Greene	72450	February 13, 2002
213	Mountain View	Stone	72560	July 6, 1997
214	Mountain View	Stone	72560	October 11, 1997
215	Paragould	Greene	72450	July 6, 1997
216	Texarkana	Miller	71854	August 14, 1998
217	Newport	Jackson	72112	January 25, 1998
218	Pine Bluff	Jefferson	71601	September 22, 2011
219	Jonesboro	Craighead	72401	February 27, 1999
220	Fordyce	Dallas	71742	December 5, 2001
221	Paragould	Greene	72450	September 11, 2002
222	McGehee	Desha	71654	July 6, 1997
223	Glenwood	Pike	71943	July 22, 1999
224	Monticello	Drew	71655	May 10, 2001
225	West Memphis	Crittenden	72301	March 3, 2001
226	Warren	Bradley	71671	July 6, 1997
227	Roe	Monroe	72134	December 4, 2003
228	Helena	Phillips	72342	May 8, 2001
229	Crossett	Ashley	71635	April 14, 2004
230	Arkadelphia	Clark	71923	July 6, 1997
231	Camden	Ouachita	71701	July 6, 1997
232	Gassville	Baxter	72635	June 5, 2014
233	DeWitt	Arkansas	72042	September 18, 2001
234	Magnolia	Columbia	71753	July 6, 1997
235	Magnolia	Columbia	71753	July 6, 1997
236	Paragould	Greene	72450	July 6, 1997
237	Lake City	Craighead	72437	July 6, 1997
238	Wynne	Cross	72396	July 6, 1997
239	Paragould	Greene	72450	July 6, 1997
240	Paragould	Greene	72450	July 6, 1997
241	Roe	Monroe	72134	July 6, 1997
242	Langley	Pike	71952	September 6, 2017
243	Jonesboro	Craighead	72401	August 14, 1998
244	Earle	Crittenden	72331	March 4, 2021
245	Arkadelphia	Clark	71923	July 6, 1997
246	Arkadelphia	Clark	71923	July 6, 1997
247	Pine Bluff	Jefferson	71601	July 6, 1997
248	Pocahontas	Randolph	72455	August 14, 1998
249	Delaplaine	Greene	72425	July 6, 1997
250	Fordyce	Dallas	71742	January 8, 2004
251	Desha	Independence	72527	July 6, 1997
252	Grubbs	Jackson	72431	July 6, 1997
253	Jonesboro	Craighead	72401	August 14, 1998
254	Carthage	Dallas	71725	July 6, 1997
255	Hazen	Prairie	72064	July 6, 1997
256	Des Arc	Prairie	72040	July 6, 1997
257	Cherokee Village	Sharp	72529	July 6, 1997
258	Oxford	Izard	72565	July 6, 1997
259	Knobel	Clay	72435	July 6, 1997
260	Arkadelphia	Clark	71923	May 16, 2002
261	Forrest City	St. Francis	72335	July 6, 1997
262	Paragould	Greene	72450	June 13, 2000
263	Gould	Lincoln	71643	July 6, 1997
264	Batesville	Independence	72501	July 6, 1997
265	Lake Village	Chicot	71653	July 6, 1997
266	Sidney	Sharp	72577	July 6, 1997
267	Pine Bluff	Jefferson	71601	February 27, 1999
268	Jonesboro	Craighead	72401	February 27, 1999
269	Mountain View	Stone	72560	July 6, 1997
270	Forrest City	St. Francis	72335	July 6, 1997
271	Harrisburg	Poinsett	72432	May 3, 2007
272	Jonesboro	Craighead	72401	October 31, 2000
273	Jonesboro	Craighead	72401	March 7, 2002
274	Okolona	Clark	71962	July 6, 1997
275	Jonesboro	Craighead	72401	May 13, 2002
276	Success	Clay	72470	July 6, 1997
277	Batesville	Independence	72501	August 27, 2002
278	Blytheville	Mississippi	72315	April 8, 2002
279	De Queen	Sevier	71832	May 24, 2004
280	Harrison	Boone	72601	June 2, 2011
281	Texarkana	Miller	71854	July 8, 2011
282	St. Charles	Arkansas	72140	July 6, 1997
283	Cave City	Sharp	72521	July 6, 1997
284	Trumann	Poinsett	72472	January 14, 2000
285	Murfreesboro	Pike	71958	July 6, 1997
286	Dierks	Howard	71833	July 6, 1997
287	Mineral Springs	Howard	71851	July 6, 1997
288	Batesville	Independence	72501	October 31, 2000
289	Lockesburg	Sevier	71846	July 6, 1997
290	Delight	Pike	71940	September 6, 2017
291	Melbourne	Izard	72556	February 27, 1999
292	Hope	Hempstead	71801	November 7, 2002
293	Arkadelphia	Clark	71923	November 7, 2002
294	Pelsor	Pope	72856	July 6, 1997
295	Marianna	Lee	72360	July 6, 1997
296	Bull Shoals	Marion	72619	October 29, 2013
297	Calico Rock	Izard	72519	July 6, 1997
298	Marianna	Lee	72360	August 20, 2000
299	Magnolia	Columbia	71753	July 31, 2002
300	Dermott	Chicot	71638	August 24, 2011
301	Augusta	Woodruff	72006	March 19, 2012
302	Harrison	Boone	72601	May 10, 2012
303	Hazen	Prairie	72064	December 12, 2013
304	Crossett	Ashley	71635	July 6, 1997
305	Crossett	Ashley	71635	August 14, 1998
306	Okolona	Clark	71962	September 6, 2017
307	Batesville	Independence	72501	January 25, 1998
308	Monticello	Drew	71655	October 11, 1997
309	El Dorado	Union	71730	July 6, 1997
310	El Dorado	Union	71730	July 6, 1997
312	El Dorado	Union	71730	August 14, 1998
313	Fordyce	Dallas	71742	July 6, 1997
314	El Dorado	Union	71730	January 25, 1998
315	El Dorado	Union	71730	February 27, 1999
316	Jonesboro	Craighead	72401	July 18, 2001
317	Forrest City	St. Francis	72335	June 11, 2002
318	Cherry Valley	Cross	72324	June 11, 2002
319	Brinkley	Monroe	72021	June 11, 2002
320	Ravenden Springs	Randolph	72460	November 30, 2012
321	Mountain Home	Baxter	72653	August 20, 2000
322	Franklin	Izard	72536	July 6, 1997
323	Corning	Clay	72422	October 14, 2002
324	Piggott	Clay	72454	October 14, 2002
325	Rison	Cleveland	71665	July 6, 1997
326	Oden	Montgomery	71961	July 6, 1997
328	Fisher	Poinsett	72429	July 6, 1997
329	Pine Bluff	Jefferson	71601	June 13, 2000
330	Texarkana	Miller	71854	October 17, 2002
331	Hope	Hempstead	71801	August 20, 2000
332	Pine Bluff	Jefferson	71601	October 31, 2000
333	Jonesboro	Craighead	72401	July 30, 2002
334	Norman	Montgomery	71960	July 6, 1997
335	Paragould	Greene	72450	August 20, 2000
336	Jonesboro	Craighead	72401	January 29, 2003
337	Norman	Montgomery	71960	September 6, 2017
338	Helena	Phillips	72342	July 6, 1997
339	Hughes	St. Francis	72348	July 6, 1997
340	Jonesboro	Craighead	72401	November 1, 2011
341	Pine Bluff	Jefferson	71601	June 13, 2000
342	Amity	Clark	71921	July 6, 1997
343	Turrell	Crittenden	72384	July 6, 1997
344	DeWitt	Arkansas	72042	June 17, 2005
345	Arkadelphia	Clark	71923	October 31, 2000
346	Mount Pleasant	Izard	72561	July 6, 1997
347	Augusta	Woodruff	72006	July 6, 1997
348	Kingsland	Cleveland	71652	July 6, 1997
349	Tuckerman	Jackson	72473	July 6, 1997
350	Berryville	Carroll	72616	June 16, 2005
351	Jonesboro	Craighead	72401	June 13, 2000
352	Fordyce	Dallas	71742	July 6, 1997
353	Gurdon	Clark	71743	July 6, 1997
354	Umpire	Howard	71971	September 6, 2017
355	Eudora	Chicot	71640	July 6, 1997
356	Glenwood	Pike	71943	July 6, 1997
357	Star City	Lincoln	71667	July 6, 1997
358	Marked Tree	Poinsett	72365	July 6, 1997
359	Pine Bluff	Jefferson	71601	July 10, 2009
360	Pine Bluff	Jefferson	71601	May 5, 2016
361	Texarkana	Miller	71854	October 19, 2017
362	Wynne	Cross	72396	August 20, 2000
363	Fox	Stone	72051	July 6, 1997
364	Crossett	Ashley	71635	July 6, 1997
365	Harrison	Boone	72601	July 6, 1997
366	Sparkman	Dallas	71763	July 6, 1997
367	Monticello	Drew	71655	July 6, 1997
368	Melbourne	Izard	72556	July 6, 1997
369	Wilmot	Ashley	71676	February 1, 2018
370	Star City	Lincoln	71667	October 16, 2002
371	Salem	Fulton	72576	October 16, 2002
372	Clarendon	Monroe	72029	October 16, 2002
373	Melbourne	Izard	72556	October 16, 2002
374	Gould	Lincoln	71643	October 16, 2002
375	Marked Tree	Poinsett	72365	January 14, 2000
376	Corning	Clay	72422	December 29, 2003
377	Dumas	Desha	71639	August 27, 2002
378	Pocahontas	Randolph	72455	August 27, 2002
379	Delight	Pike	71940	July 6, 1997
380	Pine Bluff	Jefferson	71601	February 14, 2018
381	Winthrop	Little River	71866	July 6, 1997
382	Dumas	Desha	71639	July 6, 1997
383	Flippin	Marion	72634	August 13, 2008
384	Cave City	Sharp	72521	April 23, 2003
385	Wickes	Polk	71973	July 6, 1997
386	Gillham	Sevier	71841	July 6, 1997
387	Cove	Polk	71937	July 6, 1997
388	Saratoga	Hempstead	71859	July 6, 1997
389	Hatfield	Polk	71945	July 6, 1997
390	Camden	Ouachita	71701	December 23, 2002
391	Harrison	Boone	72601	July 6, 1997
392	Tillar	Desha	71670	July 6, 1997
393	Jonesboro	Craighead	72401	February 28, 2018
394	West Memphis	Crittenden	72301	May 8, 2001
395	Pine Bluff	Jefferson	71601	October 24, 2006
396	Delaplaine	Greene	72425	April 23, 2018
397	Hope	Hempstead	71801	March 31, 2003
398	Kirby	Pike	71950	July 6, 1997
399	Blevins	Hempstead	71825	April 25, 2018
400	West Memphis	Crittenden	72301	October 13, 1999
401	Pine Bluff	Jefferson	71601	May 8, 2013
402	Midway	Baxter	72651	January 3, 2014
403	Arkadelphia	Clark	71923	January 25, 1998
404	Mountain Home	Baxter	72653	July 6, 1997
405	Mountain Home	Baxter	72653	October 3, 2002
406	Gurdon	Clark	71743	April 23, 2003
407	Marvell	Phillips	72366	January 3, 2014
408	Harrisburg	Poinsett	72432	April 23, 2003
409	Blytheville	Mississippi	72315	October 13, 2005
410	Wilson	Mississippi	72395	April 23, 2003
412	Monticello	Drew	71655	January 31, 2012
413	Pine Bluff	Jefferson	71601	June 30, 2001
414	Harrison	Boone	72601	May 6, 2003
415	Crossett	Ashley	71635	September 15, 2003
416	Harrison	Boone	72601	June 20, 2001
417	Lake Village	Chicot	71653	April 14, 2004
418	Trumann	Poinsett	72472	January 30, 2007
419	Pine Bluff	Jefferson	71601	November 25, 2014
420	Compton	Newton	72624	July 6, 1997
421	Mountain Home	Baxter	72653	July 6, 1997
422	Lead Hill	Boone	72644	July 6, 1997
423	Berryville	Carroll	72616	July 6, 1997
424	Mountain Home	Baxter	72653	July 6, 1997
425	Mountain Home	Baxter	72653	July 6, 1997
426	Omaha	Boone	72662	July 6, 1997
427	Everton	Boone	72633	July 6, 1997
428	Deer	Newton	72628	July 6, 1997
429	Western Grove	Newton	72685	July 6, 1997
430	Gassville	Baxter	72635	July 6, 1997
431	Lakeview	Baxter	72642	July 6, 1997
432	Prescott	Nevada	71857	March 1, 2006
433	Cherokee Village	Sharp	72529	May 29, 2018
434	Mount Judea	Newton	72655	July 6, 1997
435	Gassville	Baxter	72635	July 6, 1997
436	Lead Hill	Boone	72644	July 6, 1997
437	Alpena	Carroll	72611	July 6, 1997
438	Green Forest	Carroll	72638	July 6, 1997
439	Saint Joe	Searcy	72675	July 6, 1997
440	El Dorado	Union	71730	February 4, 2003
441	Pine Bluff	Jefferson	71601	February 4, 2003
442	Cherry Valley	Cross	72324	August 20, 2000
443	Monticello	Drew	71655	June 13, 2000
444	El Dorado	Union	71730	October 29, 2013
445	Bull Shoals	Marion	72619	July 6, 1997
446	Jasper	Newton	72641	July 6, 1997
447	Leslie	Searcy	72645	July 6, 1997
448	Marshall	Searcy	72650	July 6, 1997
449	Yellville	Marion	72687	July 6, 1997
450	Paragould	Greene	72450	April 28, 2003
451	Nashville	Howard	71852	August 14, 1998
452	El Dorado	Union	71730	October 31, 2000
453	Flippin	Marion	72634	July 6, 1997
454	Camden	Ouachita	71701	December 8, 2009
455	Nashville	Howard	71852	May 13, 2002
456	Stuttgart	Arkansas	72160	April 21, 2003
457	Wheatley	St. Francis	72392	July 6, 1997
458	Viola	Fulton	72583	July 6, 1997
459	Cotton Plant	Woodruff	72036	July 6, 1997
460	Monticello	Drew	71655	July 6, 1997
461	Rison	Cleveland	71665	December 18, 2003
462	Holly Grove	Monroe	72069	July 6, 1997
463	Hermitage	Bradley	71647	July 6, 1997
464	Arkadelphia	Clark	71923	June 13, 2000
465	Banks	Bradley	71631	July 6, 1997
466	Warren	Bradley	71671	April 17, 2003
467	Gamaliel	Baxter	72537	July 6, 1997
468	Clarendon	Monroe	72029	February 20, 2001
469	Wilmar	Drew	71675	July 6, 1997
470	Mountain Home	Baxter	72653	January 3, 2014
471	Yellville	Marion	72687	October 29, 2013
472	Camden	Ouachita	71701	October 31, 2000
473	Wilmot	Ashley	71676	July 6, 1997
474	Hope	Hempstead	71801	May 8, 2001
475	Lepanto	Poinsett	72354	July 6, 1997
476	Paragould	Greene	72450	August 20, 2000
477	Cash	Craighead	72421	July 6, 1997
478	Gillham	Sevier	71841	February 5, 2015
479	Grady	Lincoln	71644	July 6, 1997
480	Berryville	Carroll	72616	October 11, 1997
481	Midway	Baxter	72651	July 6, 1997
482	Caraway	Craighead	72419	July 6, 1997
483	Trumann	Poinsett	72472	July 6, 1997
484	Sheridan	Grant	72150	June 20, 2001
485	Swifton	Jackson	72471	July 6, 1997
486	Monette	Craighead	72447	July 6, 1997
487	Tyronza	Poinsett	72386	July 6, 1997
488	Henderson	Baxter	72544	July 6, 1997
489	Pine Bluff	Jefferson	71601	October 31, 2000
490	Mount Ida	Montgomery	71957	June 2, 2004
491	Mountain Home	Baxter	72653	July 6, 1997
492	Mountain Home	Baxter	72653	July 6, 1997
493	Manila	Mississippi	72442	May 8, 2001
494	Forrest City	St. Francis	72335	June 13, 2000
495	Newport	Jackson	72112	May 8, 2001
496	Witts Springs	Searcy	72686	July 6, 1997
497	Jonesboro	Craighead	72401	August 10, 2018
498	Camden	Ouachita	71701	May 10, 2001
499	Norfork	Baxter	72658	July 6, 1997
500	Crossett	Ashley	71635	October 21, 2003
501	McGehee	Desha	71654	October 21, 2003
502	Pine Bluff	Jefferson	71601	January 25, 1998
503	Newport	Jackson	72112	October 11, 1997
504	Marshall	Searcy	72650	June 1, 2004
505	Berryville	Carroll	72616	January 9, 2006
506	Bull Shoals	Marion	72619	November 17, 2009
507	Midway	Baxter	72651	February 25, 2009
508	Mountain Home	Baxter	72653	July 6, 1997
509	DeWitt	Arkansas	72042	March 6, 2008
510	Pine Bluff	Jefferson	71601	July 6, 1997
512	Newport	Jackson	72112	July 6, 1997
513	Oden	Montgomery	71961	August 22, 2005
514	West Memphis	Crittenden	72301	May 14, 2003
515	Pine Bluff	Jefferson	71601	May 10, 1999
516	Monette	Craighead	72447	January 30, 2007
517	Mountain Home	Baxter	72653	July 30, 2008
518	De Queen	Sevier	71832	March 22, 2005
519	Forrest City	St. Francis	72335	March 3, 2001
520	Jonesboro	Craighead	72401	October 29, 2013
521	Newark	Independence	72562	October 25, 2018
522	Rector	Clay	72461	July 6, 1997
523	Newport	Jackson	72112	July 6, 1997
524	Waldo	Columbia	71770	December 14, 2006
525	Cherry Valley	Cross	72324	May 8, 2001
526	Osceola	Mississippi	72370	July 6, 1997
527	Brinkley	Monroe	72021	May 8, 2001
528	Strawberry	Lawrence	72469	July 6, 1997
529	Piggott	Clay	72454	July 6, 1997
530	Jonesboro	Craighead	72401	October 31, 2000
531	Etowah	Mississippi	72428	July 6, 1997
532	Blytheville	Mississippi	72315	July 6, 1997
533	Stamps	Lafayette	71860	July 6, 1997
534	Pine Bluff	Jefferson	71601	July 6, 1997
535	Pine Bluff	Jefferson	71601	July 6, 1997
536	Pine Bluff	Jefferson	71601	July 6, 1997
537	Joiner	Mississippi	72350	July 6, 1997
538	Dermott	Chicot	71638	July 6, 1997
539	Leachville	Mississippi	72438	July 6, 1997
540	Pine Bluff	Jefferson	71601	July 6, 1997
541	Pine Bluff	Jefferson	71601	July 6, 1997
542	Foreman	Little River	71836	July 6, 1997
543	Pine Bluff	Jefferson	71601	July 6, 1997
544	Pollard	Clay	72456	July 6, 1997
545	Green Forest	Carroll	72638	July 6, 1997
546	Smackover	Union	71762	July 6, 1997
547	Emerson	Columbia	71740	July 6, 1997
548	Gillett	Arkansas	72055	July 6, 1997
549	Osceola	Mississippi	72370	July 14, 2003
550	Pine Bluff	Jefferson	71601	July 6, 1997
551	West Memphis	Crittenden	72301	January 31, 2012
552	Carlisle	Lonoke	72024	July 6, 1997
553	Compton	Newton	72624	July 6, 1997
554	Mount Holly	Union	71758	July 6, 1997
556	Pine Bluff	Jefferson	71601	February 27, 1999
557	Nashville	Howard	71852	September 19, 2003
558	Ash Flat	Sharp	72513	August 13, 2008
559	Marion	Crittenden	72364	January 13, 2004
560	Pine Bluff	Jefferson	71601	July 6, 1997
561	Manila	Mississippi	72442	July 6, 1997
562	Magnolia	Columbia	71753	January 23, 2001
563	Osceola	Mississippi	72370	July 6, 1997
564	Manila	Mississippi	72442	July 6, 1997
565	Paragould	Greene	72450	May 8, 2001
566	Rector	Clay	72461	July 6, 1997
567	Crossett	Ashley	71635	July 6, 1997
568	Arkadelphia	Clark	71923	May 8, 2001
569	Batesville	Independence	72501	May 8, 2001
570	Manila	Mississippi	72442	January 30, 2007
571	Texarkana	Miller	71854	February 24, 2009
572	Helena	Phillips	72342	July 6, 1997
573	Beech Grove	Greene	72412	July 6, 1997
574	Camden	Ouachita	71701	July 6, 1997
575	Pine Bluff	Jefferson	71601	October 31, 2000
576	Osceola	Mississippi	72370	March 27, 2005
577	Harrison	Boone	72601	October 31, 2000
578	Harrisburg	Poinsett	72432	July 6, 1997
579	Waldenburg	Poinsett	72475	July 6, 1997
580	Mountain Home	Baxter	72653	February 25, 2009
581	Palestine	St. Francis	72372	July 6, 1997
582	De Queen	Sevier	71832	October 13, 1999
583	Umpire	Howard	71971	July 6, 1997
584	De Queen	Sevier	71832	July 6, 1997
585	Timbo	Stone	72680	July 6, 1997
586	Lafe	Greene	72436	July 6, 1997
587	Wynne	Cross	72396	March 3, 2001
588	Cherry Valley	Cross	72324	July 6, 1997
589	Brinkley	Monroe	72021	June 13, 2000
590	Smackover	Union	71762	March 21, 2008
591	Mountain View	Stone	72560	July 6, 1997
592	Pine Bluff	Jefferson	71601	December 14, 2001
593	Marked Tree	Poinsett	72365	July 6, 1997
594	Forrest City	St. Francis	72335	May 8, 2001
595	Rector	Clay	72461	July 6, 1997
596	Stephens	Ouachita	71764	July 6, 1997
597	Marmaduke	Greene	72443	July 6, 1997
598	Piggott	Clay	72454	July 6, 1997
599	Junction City	Union	71749	July 6, 1997
600	Ashdown	Little River	71822	January 21, 2015
601	Gassville	Baxter	72635	August 13, 2008
602	Prescott	Nevada	71857	April 19, 2006
603	Fisher	Poinsett	72429	September 8, 2008
604	Manila	Mississippi	72442	January 14, 2020
605	Weiner	Poinsett	72479	September 8, 2008
606	Bradley	Lafayette	71826	November 24, 2014
607	Mountain Home	Baxter	72653	February 25, 2009
608	Bearden	Ouachita	71720	November 20, 2009
609	Pocahontas	Randolph	72455	August 16, 2006
610	Hatfield	Polk	71945	January 16, 2015
612	Batesville	Independence	72501	July 6, 1997
613	Batesville	Independence	72501	July 6, 1997
614	Luxora	Mississippi	72358	May 8, 2001
615	Mountain View	Stone	72560	December 6, 2004
616	Lake City	Craighead	72437	January 30, 2007
617	Arkadelphia	Clark	71923	December 8, 2009
618	El Dorado	Union	71730	September 21, 2020
619	Pine Bluff	Jefferson	71601	June 30, 2001
620	Lakeview	Baxter	72642	February 25, 2009
621	Texarkana	Miller	71854	September 6, 2019
622	Osceola	Mississippi	72370	October 13, 1999
623	Blytheville	Mississippi	72315	August 20, 2000
624	Tuckerman	Jackson	72473	February 7, 2005
625	Mammoth Spring	Fulton	72554	July 6, 1997
626	Magnolia	Columbia	71753	May 10, 2001
627	Jonesboro	Craighead	72401	March 13, 2002
628	Star City	Lincoln	71667	July 6, 1997
629	West Memphis	Crittenden	72301	September 23, 2004
630	Forrest City	St. Francis	72335	July 6, 1997
631	Corning	Clay	72422	August 29, 2005
632	Lake Village	Chicot	71653	March 17, 2005
633	Forrest City	St. Francis	72335	July 6, 1997
634	Piggott	Clay	72454	February 20, 2001
635	West Memphis	Crittenden	72301	May 27, 2004
636	West Memphis	Crittenden	72301	August 20, 2000
637	Walnut Ridge	Lawrence	72476	May 8, 2001
638	Brinkley	Monroe	72021	March 3, 2001
639	El Dorado	Union	71730	June 30, 2001
640	Flippin	Marion	72634	November 17, 2009
641	Salem	Fulton	72576	August 13, 2008
642	De Queen	Sevier	71832	July 6, 1997
643	Pine Bluff	Jefferson	71601	January 9, 2007
644	Watson	Desha	71674	July 6, 1997
645	Fulton	Hempstead	71838	July 6, 1997
646	Imboden	Lawrence	72434	January 24, 2020
647	Maynard	Randolph	72444	July 6, 1997
648	Texarkana	Miller	71854	January 6, 2005
649	Stuttgart	Arkansas	72160	May 6, 2020
650	Trumann	Poinsett	72472	August 5, 2003
651	Lake City	Craighead	72437	March 12, 2015
652	Pleasant Grove	Stone	72567	July 6, 1997
653	Fouke	Miller	71837	July 6, 1997
654	Berryville	Carroll	72616	November 12, 2001
655	Wilson	Mississippi	72395	July 6, 1997
656	Mountain Home	Baxter	72653	July 28, 2005
657	Heth	St. Francis	72346	July 6, 1997
658	Luxora	Mississippi	72358	July 6, 1997
659	Stuttgart	Arkansas	72160	August 20, 2000
660	Des Arc	Prairie	72040	January 5, 2010
661	Sparkman	Dallas	71763	March 31, 2015
662	Marianna	Lee	72360	May 3, 2006
663	Pine Bluff	Jefferson	71601	May 13, 2002
664	Newport	Jackson	72112	August 20, 2000
665	El Dorado	Union	71730	June 30, 2001
666	Jonesboro	Craighead	72401	January 18, 2019
667	Ashdown	Little River	71822	May 13, 2002
668	Concord	Cleburne	72523	July 6, 1997
669	Glenwood	Pike	71943	July 13, 2015
670	Horseshoe Bend	Izard	72512	July 6, 1997
671	Pine Bluff	Jefferson	71601	October 27, 2005
672	Stuttgart	Arkansas	72160	July 6, 1997
673	Stuttgart	Arkansas	72160	July 6, 1997
674	Stuttgart	Arkansas	72160	October 13, 1999
675	Camden	Ouachita	71701	August 20, 2000
676	Midway	Baxter	72651	February 5, 2015
677	El Dorado	Union	71730	September 22, 2003
678	Sparkman	Dallas	71763	July 6, 1997
679	Walnut Ridge	Lawrence	72476	October 31, 2000
680	Jonesboro	Craighead	72401	August 12, 2003
681	Glenwood	Pike	71943	August 22, 2007
682	Elaine	Phillips	72333	February 5, 2015
683	Garland City	Miller	71839	July 6, 1997
684	Weiner	Poinsett	72479	July 6, 1997
685	Chidester	Ouachita	71726	July 6, 1997
686	Buckner	Lafayette	71827	September 27, 2018
687	Bearden	Ouachita	71720	July 6, 1997
688	Harrison	Boone	72601	January 16, 2002
689	Louann	Ouachita	71751	July 6, 1997
690	McGehee	Desha	71654	October 20, 2003
691	Doddridge	Miller	71834	July 6, 1997
692	Pine Bluff	Jefferson	71601	July 6, 1997
693	Waldo	Columbia	71770	July 6, 1997
694	Taylor	Columbia	71861	July 6, 1997
695	McNeil	Columbia	71752	July 6, 1997
696	Magnolia	Columbia	71753	July 6, 1997
697	Hickory Ridge	Cross	72347	July 6, 1997
698	Batesville	Independence	72501	July 6, 1997
699	Prattsville	Grant	72129	July 6, 1997
701	Mountain Home	Baxter	72653	November 8, 2013
702	West Memphis	Crittenden	72301	January 25, 1998
703	Hope	Hempstead	71801	October 11, 1997
704	Harrison	Boone	72601	August 14, 1998
705	Ash Flat	Sharp	72513	January 28, 2019
706	Mountain Home	Baxter	72653	January 25, 1998
707	Lakeview	Baxter	72642	January 3, 2014
708	Waldo	Columbia	71770	January 3, 2014
709	Gurdon	Clark	71743	February 8, 2019
710	Cherokee Village	Sharp	72529	July 6, 1997
712	Green Forest	Carroll	72638	April 20, 2015
713	El Dorado	Union	71730	April 9, 2019
714	Helena	Phillips	72342	January 13, 2006
715	Harrison	Boone	72601	July 6, 1997
716	Harrison	Boone	72601	April 12, 2019
717	Wabbaseka	Jefferson	72175	January 23, 2001
718	Pine Bluff	Jefferson	71601	February 27, 1999
719	Harrison	Boone	72601	July 2, 2020
721	Washington	Hempstead	71862	May 7, 2019
722	Hope	Hempstead	71801	July 6, 1997
723	Monticello	Drew	71655	January 14, 2002
724	Gurdon	Clark	71743	December 20, 2010
725	Smackover	Union	71762	July 6, 1997
726	Green Forest	Carroll	72638	June 20, 2001
727	Pine Bluff	Jefferson	71601	November 18, 2003
728	Marvell	Phillips	72366	December 21, 2006
729	Hope	Hempstead	71801	October 31, 2000
730	Pine Bluff	Jefferson	71601	October 11, 1997
731	McCrory	Woodruff	72101	July 6, 1997
732	West Memphis	Crittenden	72301	July 6, 1997
733	West Memphis	Crittenden	72301	July 6, 1997
734	Brinkley	Monroe	72021	July 6, 1997
735	West Memphis	Crittenden	72301	July 6, 1997
736	Mountain Home	Baxter	72653	January 24, 2007
737	Portland	Ashley	71663	July 6, 1997
738	Jonesboro	Craighead	72401	September 18, 2001
739	Marion	Crittenden	72364	July 6, 1997
740	Blytheville	Mississippi	72315	July 6, 1997
741	Harrison	Boone	72601	July 6, 1997
742	Strong	Union	71765	March 22, 2011
743	Harrison	Boone	72601	July 6, 1997
744	Augusta	Woodruff	72006	July 6, 1997
745	Magnolia	Columbia	71753	October 31, 2000
746	Timbo	Stone	72680	July 6, 1997
747	Clarendon	Monroe	72029	July 6, 1997
748	El Dorado	Union	71730	July 6, 1997
749	Oak Grove	Carroll	72660	July 6, 1997
750	Horseshoe Bend	Izard	72512	August 5, 2003
751	Ash Flat	Sharp	72513	August 5, 2003
752	Brinkley	Monroe	72021	August 20, 2000
753	Helena	Phillips	72342	June 30, 2001
754	Harrison	Boone	72601	December 21, 2006
755	Parkin	Cross	72373	July 6, 1997
756	Jonesboro	Craighead	72401	January 30, 2007
757	Fifty-Six	Stone	72533	July 6, 1997
758	Pocahontas	Randolph	72455	February 27, 2001
759	Walnut Ridge	Lawrence	72476	March 3, 2001
760	Lockesburg	Sevier	71846	January 21, 2015
761	Jonesboro	Craighead	72401	July 6, 1997
762	Blytheville	Mississippi	72315	July 6, 1997
763	Blytheville	Mississippi	72315	July 6, 1997
764	Dyess	Mississippi	72330	July 6, 1997
765	Leola	Grant	72084	July 6, 1997
766	Wabbaseka	Jefferson	72175	July 6, 1997
767	Tuckerman	Jackson	72473	August 11, 2004
768	Moro	Lee	72368	July 6, 1997
769	Biggers	Randolph	72413	July 6, 1997
770	Bay	Craighead	72411	August 16, 2006
771	Marion	Crittenden	72364	November 4, 2019
772	Texarkana	Miller	71854	October 11, 1997
773	Texarkana	Miller	71854	October 11, 1997
774	Texarkana	Miller	71854	October 11, 1997
775	Texarkana	Miller	71854	October 31, 2001
776	Blytheville	Mississippi	72315	October 31, 2000
777	Hope	Hempstead	71801	July 6, 1997
778	Gassville	Baxter	72635	November 17, 2009
779	Texarkana	Miller	71854	October 11, 1997
780	Blytheville	Mississippi	72315	October 11, 1997
781	Bay	Craighead	72411	July 6, 1997
782	Glenwood	Pike	71943	August 22, 2005
783	Rector	Clay	72461	December 4, 2006
784	De Queen	Sevier	71832	March 8, 2005
785	Oil Trough	Independence	72564	March 10, 2004
786	Stephens	Ouachita	71764	July 6, 1997
787	Paragould	Greene	72450	October 31, 2000
788	Pine Bluff	Jefferson	71601	April 15, 2002
789	El Dorado	Union	71730	July 10, 2020
790	Viola	Fulton	72583	August 13, 2008
791	Camden	Ouachita	71701	June 30, 2001
792	Earle	Crittenden	72331	July 6, 1997
793	Batesville	Independence	72501	July 6, 1997
794	Pine Bluff	Jefferson	71601	June 30, 2001
795	Yellville	Marion	72687	August 13, 2008
796	Prescott	Nevada	71857	March 17, 2004
797	Strong	Union	71765	July 6, 1997
798	Hampton	Calhoun	71744	July 6, 1997
799	Newark	Independence	72562	July 6, 1997
800	Rosston	Nevada	71858	September 21, 2018
801	Marshall	Searcy	72650	June 11, 2015
802	Jonesboro	Craighead	72401	May 18, 1998
803	Jonesboro	Craighead	72401	January 3, 2014
804	Tuckerman	Jackson	72473	July 13, 2016
805	Batesville	Independence	72501	January 25, 1998
806	Batesville	Independence	72501	April 8, 2021
807	Camden	Ouachita	71701	October 11, 1997
808	Tuckerman	Jackson	72473	November 15, 2013
809	Walnut Ridge	Lawrence	72476	January 25, 1998
810	Pocahontas	Randolph	72455	January 25, 1998
812	Flippin	Marion	72634	January 3, 2014
813	Buckner	Lafayette	71827	June 2, 2021
814	Pine Bluff	Jefferson	71601	July 6, 1997
815	Osceola	Mississippi	72370	March 3, 2001
816	Helena	Phillips	72342	July 6, 1997
817	Helena	Phillips	72342	January 25, 1998
818	Pine Bluff	Jefferson	71601	July 6, 1997
819	Jonesboro	Craighead	72401	June 30, 2001
820	Warren	Bradley	71671	February 26, 2002
821	Marianna	Lee	72360	February 26, 2002
822	Osceola	Mississippi	72370	February 26, 2002
823	Marion	Crittenden	72364	July 6, 1997
824	Blytheville	Mississippi	72315	June 30, 2001
825	Dierks	Howard	71833	June 20, 2001
826	Hope	Hempstead	71801	July 6, 1997
827	Elaine	Phillips	72333	July 6, 1997
828	Glenwood	Pike	71943	January 30, 2006
829	Marvell	Phillips	72366	July 6, 1997
830	Stuttgart	Arkansas	72160	July 6, 1997
831	Hamburg	Ashley	71646	April 10, 2003
832	Horatio	Sevier	71842	July 6, 1997
833	Camden	Ouachita	71701	January 16, 2002
834	Batesville	Independence	72501	April 10, 2003
835	Pine Bluff	Jefferson	71601	October 31, 2000
836	Camden	Ouachita	71701	July 6, 1997
837	Camden	Ouachita	71701	July 6, 1997
838	Blytheville	Mississippi	72315	July 6, 1997
839	Marion	Crittenden	72364	August 10, 2021
840	Texarkana	Miller	71854	January 13, 2022
841	Marshall	Searcy	72650	December 21, 2006
842	Holly Grove	Monroe	72069	October 17, 2002
843	Junction City	Union	71749	October 17, 2002
844	Imboden	Lawrence	72434	October 17, 2002
845	Nashville	Howard	71852	July 6, 1997
846	Ashdown	Little River	71822	January 13, 2022
847	Cherokee Village	Sharp	72529	October 17, 2002
848	Hope	Hempstead	71801	January 13, 2022
849	Harrison	Boone	72601	February 3, 2022
850	Pine Bluff	Jefferson	71601	July 6, 1997
851	Marion	Crittenden	72364	May 26, 2022
852	Tyronza	Poinsett	72386	July 6, 1997
853	Hamburg	Ashley	71646	July 6, 1997
854	Beebe	White	72012	July 6, 1997
855	Melbourne	Izard	72556	February 24, 2022
856	Hardy	Sharp	72542	July 6, 1997
857	Corning	Clay	72422	July 6, 1997
858	Sparkman	Dallas	71763	August 22, 2007
859	Taylor	Columbia	71861	July 6, 1997
860	Cherokee Village	Sharp	72529	October 10, 2019
861	Ponca	Newton	72670	July 6, 1997
862	El Dorado	Union	71730	July 6, 1997
863	El Dorado	Union	71730	July 6, 1997
864	El Dorado	Union	71730	July 6, 1997
865	El Dorado	Union	71730	February 24, 2022
866	Pine Bluff	Jefferson	71601	July 6, 1997
867	Mount Ida	Montgomery	71957	July 6, 1997
868	Arkadelphia	Clark	71923	November 12, 2002
869	Imboden	Lawrence	72434	July 6, 1997
871	Rosston	Nevada	71858	July 6, 1997
872	Pine Bluff	Jefferson	71601	September 13, 2001
873	Humphrey	Arkansas	72073	July 6, 1997
874	Blevins	Hempstead	71825	July 6, 1997
875	El Dorado	Union	71730	July 6, 1997
876	Strawberry	Lawrence	72469	November 27, 2020
877	Arkansas City	Desha	71630	July 6, 1997
878	Black Rock	Lawrence	72415	July 6, 1997
879	Pine Bluff	Jefferson	71601	July 6, 1997
880	McCrory	Woodruff	72101	July 13, 2005
881	El Dorado	Union	71730	July 6, 1997
882	Jonesboro	Craighead	72401	October 6, 2003
883	Sheridan	Grant	72150	October 7, 2003
884	Fordyce	Dallas	71742	October 6, 2003
885	Bearden	Ouachita	71720	October 6, 2003
886	Walnut Ridge	Lawrence	72476	July 6, 1997
887	Prescott	Nevada	71857	July 6, 1997
888	Ashdown	Little River	71822	October 18, 2017
889	Hughes	St. Francis	72348	May 26, 2022
890	Fordyce	Dallas	71742	August 22, 2005
891	Newark	Independence	72562	May 26, 2022
892	Pocahontas	Randolph	72455	July 6, 1997
893	Fordyce	Dallas	71742	July 13, 2015
894	Bradley	Lafayette	71826	July 6, 1997
895	Salem	Fulton	72576	July 6, 1997
896	Fulton	Hempstead	71838	July 6, 1997
897	Jonesboro	Craighead	72401	March 3, 2001
898	Ashdown	Little River	71822	July 6, 1997
899	Emmet	Nevada	71835	July 6, 1997
900	Viola	Fulton	72583	November 23, 2016
901	Magnolia	Columbia	71753	July 6, 1997
902	Blytheville	Mississippi	72315	February 24, 2022
903	Fulton	Hempstead	71838	August 4, 2022
904	Magnolia	Columbia	71753	October 11, 1997
905	Mount Ida	Montgomery	71957	August 22, 2005
906	Nashville	Howard	71852	September 1, 2022
907	Mammoth Spring	Fulton	72554	November 1, 2016
908	Arkadelphia	Clark	71923	November 3, 2022
909	Berryville	Carroll	72616	April 20, 2015
910	Jonesboro	Craighead	72401	July 6, 1997
912	Nashville	Howard	71852	July 27, 2016
913	Swifton	Jackson	72471	June 13, 2016
914	Magnolia	Columbia	71753	February 27, 1999
916	Calico Rock	Izard	72519	August 31, 2015
917	Sheridan	Grant	72150	July 6, 1997
918	Pine Bluff	Jefferson	71601	February 27, 1999
919	Jonesboro	Craighead	72401	July 6, 1997
920	Warren	Bradley	71671	November 11, 2013
921	Lewisville	Lafayette	71845	July 6, 1997
922	Augusta	Woodruff	72006	March 1, 2022
923	Hope	Hempstead	71801	October 31, 2000
924	Junction City	Union	71749	July 6, 1997
925	Murfreesboro	Pike	71958	December 21, 2006
926	Jonesboro	Craighead	72401	July 6, 1997
929	Berryville	Carroll	72616	June 26, 2007
930	Jonesboro	Craighead	72401	July 6, 1997
931	Jonesboro	Craighead	72401	July 6, 1997
932	Jonesboro	Craighead	72401	July 6, 1997
933	Jonesboro	Craighead	72401	July 6, 1997
934	Jonesboro	Craighead	72401	May 10, 1999
935	Jonesboro	Craighead	72401	July 6, 1997
936	Jonesboro	Craighead	72401	November 23, 2010
937	Ravenden Springs	Randolph	72460	October 11, 1997
938	Jonesboro	Craighead	72401	January 19, 2017
939	Pine Bluff	Jefferson	71601	January 15, 2010
940	Hamburg	Ashley	71646	August 4, 2003
941	Sheridan	Grant	72150	May 18, 1998
942	Sheridan	Grant	72150	July 6, 1997
943	Huttig	Union	71747	July 6, 1997
944	Smackover	Union	71762	August 4, 2003
945	Forrest City	St. Francis	72335	August 20, 2000
946	DeWitt	Arkansas	72042	July 6, 1997
947	Stephens	Ouachita	71764	August 4, 2003
948	Prim	Cleburne	72130	July 6, 1997
949	Magnolia	Columbia	71753	July 6, 1997
951	Strong	Union	71765	August 4, 2003
952	Warren	Bradley	71671	August 4, 2003
953	Stamps	Lafayette	71860	August 4, 2003
954	Monticello	Drew	71655	March 3, 2001
955	Hardy	Sharp	72542	August 25, 2003
956	Caraway	Craighead	72419	January 30, 2007
957	Leachville	Mississippi	72438	January 30, 2007
962	Strong	Union	71765	July 6, 1997
963	Bull Shoals	Marion	72619	August 13, 2008
965	Cash	Craighead	72421	October 17, 2022
966	Williford	Sharp	72482	July 6, 1997
967	Concord	Cleburne	72523	January 6, 2023
970	Forrest City	St. Francis	72335	January 13, 2016
971	Salem	Fulton	72576	November 1, 2016
972	Jonesboro	Craighead	72401	July 6, 1997
973	Bay	Craighead	72411	March 12, 2015
974	Jonesboro	Craighead	72401	July 6, 1997
977	Heth	St. Francis	72346	March 1, 2022
978	Amity	Clark	71921	January 16, 2015
980	Grubbs	Jackson	72431	January 11, 2023
982	De Queen	Sevier	71832	July 13, 2015
983	Washington	Hempstead	71862	July 6, 1997
985	Mount Ida	Montgomery	71957	July 13, 2015
987	Mountain Home	Baxter	72653	October 28, 2015
991	Carthage	Dallas	71725	May 22, 2015
992	Almyra	Arkansas	72003	July 6, 1997
993	Arkadelphia	Clark	71923	May 22, 2015
994	Ash Flat	Sharp	72513	July 6, 1997
995	Helena	Phillips	72342	July 6, 1997
996	Wilmot	Ashley	71676	May 22, 2015
997	Eudora	Chicot	71640	June 26, 2003
998	Biscoe	Prairie	72017	July 6, 1997
999	Crossett	Ashley	71635	December 22, 2016

Arkansas area codes: 479, 501, 870/327
	North: 417, 479, 501, 573/235	
West: 501, 918/539, 580, 903/430	870/327	East: 573/235, 731, 901, 662
	South: 903/430, 318	
Missouri area codes: 314/557, 417, 573/235, 636, 660, 816/975
Tennessee area codes: 423, 615/629, 731, 865, 901, 931
Mississippi area codes: 228, 601/769, 471/662
Louisiana area codes: 225, 318/457, 337, 504, 985
Texas area codes: 210/726, 214/469/972/945, 254, 325, 361, 409, 432, 512/737, 713/281/832/346, 806, 817/682, 830, 903/430, 915, 936, 940, 956, 979
Oklahoma area codes: 405/572, 580, 918/539
