= Fisher, Arkansas =

- City
- Location of Fisher in Poinsett County, Arkansas.
- Coordinates: 35°30′00″N 90°58′15″W
- Country: United States
- State: Arkansas
- County: Poinsett

Area
  - Total: 0.30 sq mi (0.77 km^{2})
  - Land: 0.30 sq mi (0.77 km^{2})
  - Water: 0 sq mi (0.00 km^{2})
- Elevation: 233 ft (71 m)

Population (2020)
  - Total: 180
  - Estimate (2025): 171 ▼
  - Density: 603.8/sq mi (233.11/km^{2})
- Time zone: UTC-6 (Central (CST))
  - Summer (DST): UTC-5 (CDT)
- ZIP code: 72429
- Area code: 870
- FIPS code: 05-23800
- GNIS feature ID: 2403611

Fisher is a city in Poinsett County, Arkansas, United States. The population was 180 at the 2020 census. It is included in the Jonesboro, Arkansas Metropolitan Statistical Area.

== Geography ==
According to the United States Census Bureau, the town has a total area of 0.3 square miles (0.78 km^{2}), all land.

== Demographics ==
Historical population
Census	Pop.	Note	%±
1910	53		—
1920	350		560.4%
1930	259		−26.0%
1940	205		−20.8%
1950	289		41.0%
1960	303		4.8%
1970	361		19.1%
1980	302		−16.3%
1990	245		−18.9%
2000	265		8.2%
2010	223		−15.8%
2020	180		−19.3%
2025 (est.)	171	▼	−5.0%
U.S. Decennial Census; 2014 Estimate

As of the census of 2000, there were 265 people, 111 households, and 74 families residing in the town. There were 124 housing units at an average density of 393.3 per square mile (151.9/km^{2}). The racial makeup of the town was 95.85% White, 1.51% Black or African American, 2.26% from other races, and 0.38% from two or more races. 2.64% of the population were Hispanic or Latino of any race.

There were 111 households, out of which 33.3% had children under the age of 18 living with them, 49.5% were married couples living together, 8.1% had a female householder with no husband present, and 33.3% were non-families. 29.7% of all households were made up of individuals, and 12.6% had someone living alone who was 65 years of age or older. The average household size was 2.39 and the average family size was 2.84.

In the town the population was spread out, with 24.9% under the age of 18, 7.2% from 18 to 24, 30.9% from 25 to 44, 24.9% from 45 to 64, and 12.1% who were 65 years of age or older. The median age was 37 years. For every 100 females, there were 93.4 males. For every 100 females age 18 and over, there were 97.0 males.

The median income for a household in the town was $19,286, and the median income for a family was $24,500. Males had a median income of $22,500 versus $12,656 for females. The per capita income for the town was $10,334. About 24.4% of families and 29.2% of the population were below the poverty line, including 29.8% of those under the age of eighteen and 34.3% of those 65 or over.

== Education ==
It is within the Harrisburg School District. It was formerly in the Weiner School District, which consolidated into the Harrisburg district on July 1, 2010.
