= Weiner High School =

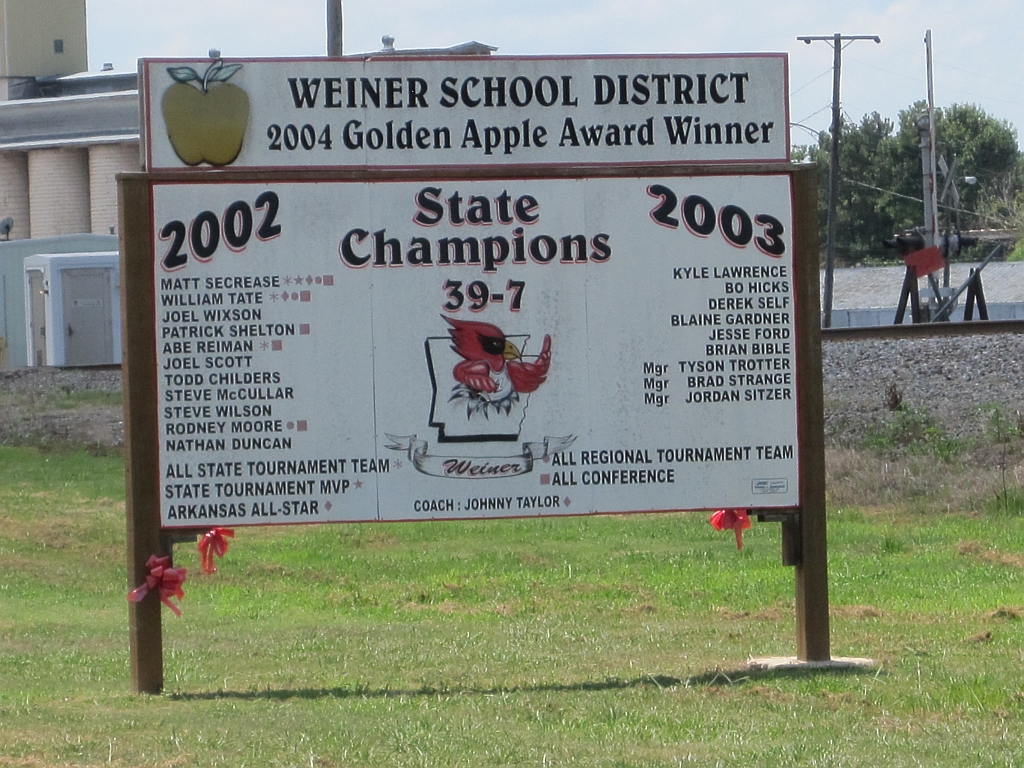
- Sign of Weiner's 2002–03 state basketball title and school district award

Location
- 313 Garfield Street; Weiner, Arkansas; United States
- Coordinates: 35°37′21″N 90°54′18″W

Information
- Type: Public secondary
- School district: Harrisburg School District (2010-2013); Weiner School District (-2010)
- NCES District ID: 0507350
- CEEB code: 042600
- NCES School ID: 050735001142
- Faculty: 18.50 (on FTE basis)
- Grades: 7–12
- Student to teacher ratio: 7.68
- Colors: Cardinal red and white
- Athletics conference: 1A 3 East (2012-14)

Weiner High School was a comprehensive public high school for students in grades 7 through 12 in Weiner, Arkansas, United States. Weiner was one of five public high schools in Poinsett County and one of two high schools in the Harrisburg School District. It closed in 2013.

== History ==
Prior to July 1, 2010, it served as the sole high school of the former Weiner School District; on that day it was annexed into Harrisburg School District.

In a four year period from 2010 to 2013 the Weiner High population declined by 37 students, about 22% of the previous enrollment.

Weiner High School closed in 2013, after the Harrisburg school board voted 4-1 for closure. Because the Harrisburg board vote was not unanimous, the Arkansas Board of Education was required to approve the closure. The ABE upheld the closure 5-2. Danny Sample, the superintendent of the Harrisburg district, cited the possibility of more academic and extracurricular programs at Harrisburg High School and the declining population of Weiner High as reasons for closure. The school district also hoped that by closing the school, additional funds would be available. The University of Arkansas Office of Educational Policy (OEP) noted that Weiner High School had higher test scores than Harrisburg Middle and High Schools, but that Weiner had fewer students on free and reduced lunches, an indicator of poverty, compared to Harrisburg High.

KAIT reported that Weiner residents were unhappy with the prospect of the school's closure. A member of the Arkansas House of Representatives, Randy Alexander, filed House Bill 1938 to prevent any attempts of the ADE, during the period January 2013 to April 2015, from "[reorganizing] a school district or a school campus" to prevent the closure of Weiner High; the bill was written in hopes that the Arkansas Legislature would consider a study done by the OEP before making the final decision on the closure of Weiner High. In 2015 State Bill 1037 was submitted in an attempt to create a replacement for Weiner High, an agricultural K-12 public school that does not need to fit the state enrollment requirements. Weiner area students now attend Harrisburg High.

== Demographics ==
Circa 2013 about 49% of Weiner High students received free or reduced lunches.

== Curriculum ==
The assumed course of study for this Title I school follows the Smart Core curriculum developed by the Arkansas Department of Education (ADE), which requires students to complete at least 22 units to graduate. Students complete regular (core and career focus) courses and exams and may select Advanced Placement coursework and exams that provide an opportunity for college credit. The school is accredited by the ADE and has been accredited by AdvancED (formerly North Central Association) since 1966.

== Academic performance ==
For the 2011-2012 school year, 89% of the grade 7-8 students at Weiner High ranked proficient or advanced in the Arkansas state benchmark literacy examinations, and 81% of the grade 7-8 students at Weiner High ranked proficient or advanced in the state benchmark mathematics examinations.

For the 2011-2012 school year, Weiner High School had higher high school level (grades 9-12) end of course examination scores in three of four subjects in most levels, except for grade 11, compared to Harrisburg High School; Weiner High's Grade 11 literacy scores were against that pattern.

As part of the University of Arkansas Office of Educational Policy (OEP) awards, Weiner High won the Top 25 Middle School and Top 5 Northeast Arkansas awards for literacy performance and the Top 10 High School due to specifically the literacy performance in the 7th grade.

== Athletics ==
The Weiner High School mascot and athletic emblem is the Cardinal with cardinal red and white serving as its school colors.

For 2012-14, the Weiner Cardinals compete in the 1A 3 East Conference under the administration of the Arkansas Activities Association. The Cardinals participate in a variety of Interscholastic activities including golf (boys/girls), bowling (boys/girls), basketball (boys/girls), cheer, baseball, softball, tennis (boys/girls) and track (boys/girls).

- Basketball: The boys basketball team won a state basketball championship in 2003 with a 39-7 record.
