= Waldenburg, Arkansas =

- Town
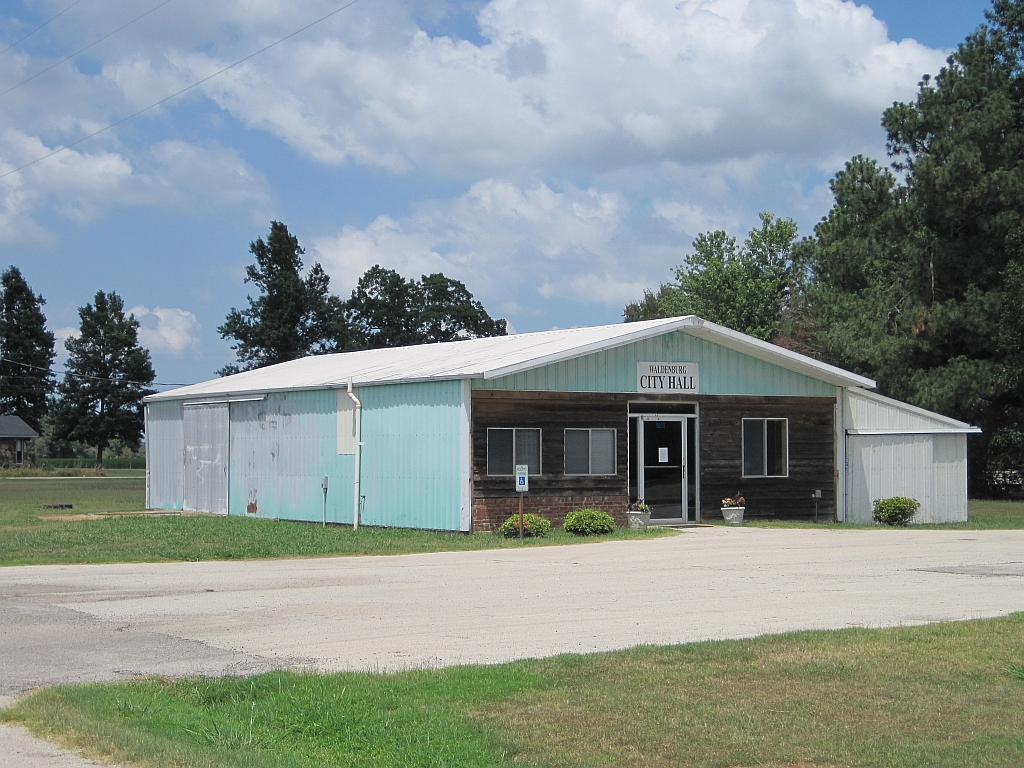
- Waldenburg City Hall

- Location of Waldenburg in Poinsett County, Arkansas.
- Coordinates: 35°33′55″N 90°56′04″W
- Country: United States
- State: Arkansas
- County: Poinsett

Area
  - Total: 0.14 sq mi (0.35 km^{2})
  - Land: 0.14 sq mi (0.35 km^{2})
  - Water: 0 sq mi (0.00 km^{2})
- Elevation: 236 ft (72 m)

Population (2020)
  - Total: 53
  - Estimate (2025): 51 ▼
  - Density: 390.5/sq mi (150.77/km^{2})
- Time zone: UTC-6 (Central (CST))
  - Summer (DST): UTC-5 (CDT)
- ZIP code: 72475
- Area code: 870
- FIPS code: 05-72320
- GNIS feature ID: 2406818

Waldenburg is a town in Poinsett County, Arkansas, United States. As of the 2020 census, Waldenburg had a population of 53. It is included in the Jonesboro, Arkansas Metropolitan Statistical Area. Waldenburg is home to Zion Lutheran Church. Zion was founded in 1881 and is a member congregation of the Lutheran Church–Missouri Synod.

== Geography ==
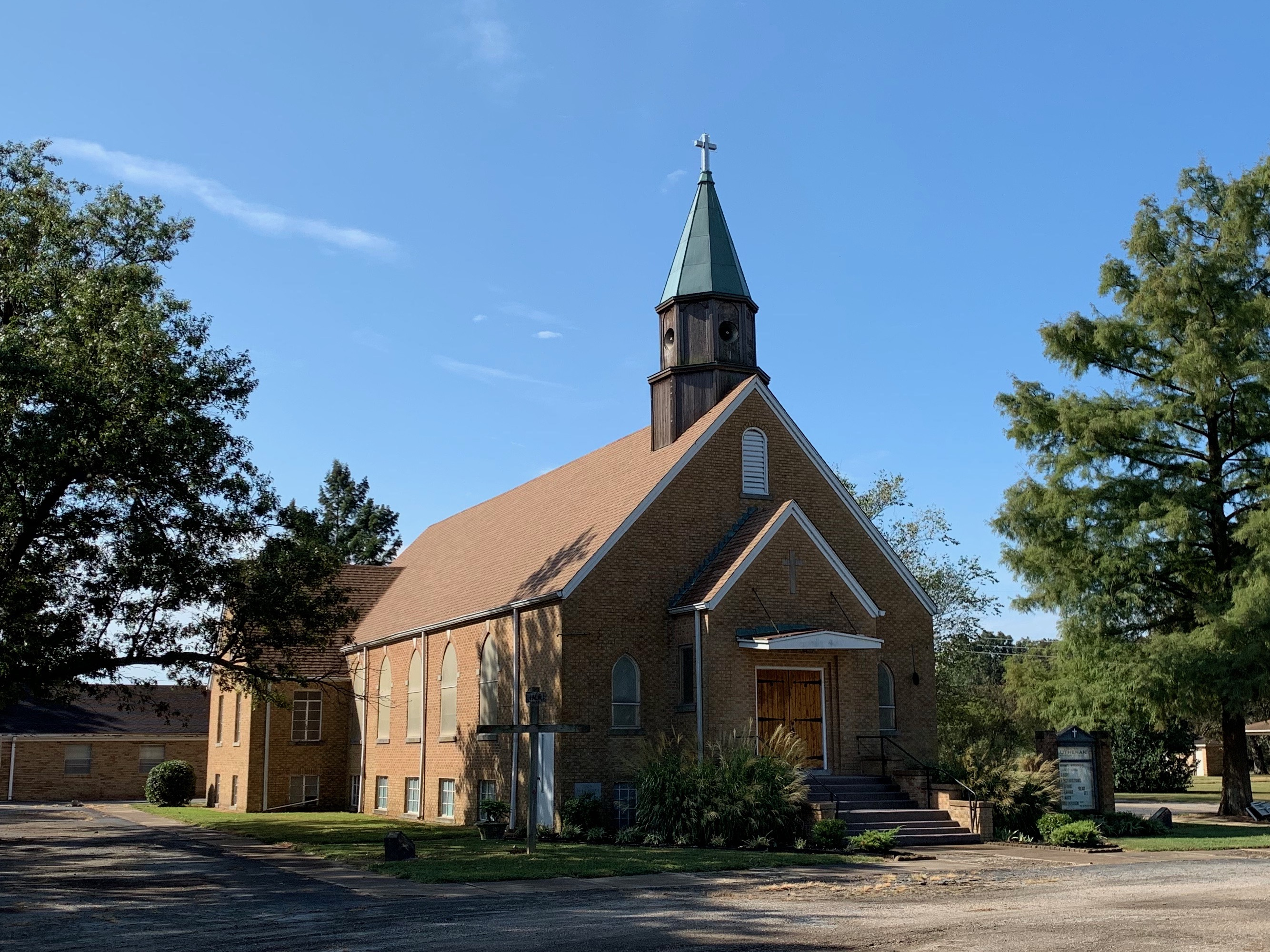
Zion Lutheran Church in Waldenburg. Zion's current building was built in the 1940s, right after World War II.

According to the United States Census Bureau, the town has a total area of 0.1 square miles (0.26 km^{2}), all land.

== Demographics ==
Historical population
Census	Pop.	Note	%±
1960	113		—
1970	164		45.1%
1980	124		−24.4%
1990	103		−16.9%
2000	80		−22.3%
2010	61		−23.7%
2020	53		−13.1%
2025 (est.)	51	▼	−3.8%
U.S. Decennial Census

As of the census of 2000, there were 80 people, 33 households, and 20 families residing in the town. The population density was 588.2 inhabitants per square mile (227.1/km^{2}). There were 39 housing units at an average density of 286.7 per square mile (110.7/km^{2}). The racial makeup of the town was 93.75% White, 5.00% Black or African American, and 1.25% from two or more races.

There were 33 households, out of which 27.3% had children under the age of 18 living with them, 54.5% were married couples living together, 6.1% had a female householder with no husband present, and 36.4% were non-families. 33.3% of all households were made up of individuals, and 3.0% had someone living alone who was 65 years of age or older. The average household size was 2.42 and the average family size was 3.19.

In the town, the population was spread out, with 23.8% under the age of 18, 10.0% from 18 to 24, 22.5% from 25 to 44, 32.5% from 45 to 64, and 11.3% who were 65 years of age or older. The median age was 39 years. For every 100 females, there were 110.5 males. For every 100 females age 18 and over, there were 134.6 males.

The median income for a household in the town was $23,750, and the median income for a family was $33,250. Males had a median income of $16,250 versus $16,250 for females. The per capita income for the town was $11,452. There were no families and 12.0% of the population living below the poverty line, including no under eighteens and 20.0% of those over 64.

== Education ==
It is within the Harrisburg School District. It was formerly in the Weiner School District, which consolidated into the Harrisburg district on July 1, 2010.
