= Hubbard Rice Dryer =

- U.S. National Register of Historic Places
- Location within Arkansas Location within the United States
- Nearest city: Weiner, Arkansas
- Coordinates: 35°40′4″N 90°45′54″W
- Area: less than one acre
- Built: 1945
- Architectural style: Plain-Traditional
- MPS: Cotton and Rice Farm History and Architecture in the Arkansas Delta MPS
- NRHP reference No.: 04001070
- Added to NRHP: October 1, 2004

The Hubbard Rice Dryer is a historic rice processing facility at 15015 Senteney Road (Poinsett County Road 624), about 7 miles (11 km) northeast of Weiner, Arkansas. It consists of ten concrete silos 50 feet (15 m) in height, arranged in pairs retreating from the roadway, which passes to the south of the facility. In the interior spaces between these concrete silos are five metal silos, 40 feet (12 m) in height. Large metal pipes protrude from the east and west side of the structure. Each silo is mounted on a concrete ring, most of which have doorways providing access into the facility's substructure, which facilitates movement between the silos. Built c. 1945, it is a well-preserved example of a period rice dryer. It was last used in 1979, and has stood vacant since then.

The property was listed on the National Register of Historic Places in 2004.

== See also ==
- Tichnor Rice Dryer and Storage Building
- National Register of Historic Places listings in Poinsett County, Arkansas
