= Trumann High School =

Location
- 1620 West Main Street; Trumann, Arkansas 72472-2712; United States; 35°40′24″N 90°31′3″W

Information
- School type: Public comprehensive
- Status: Open
- School district: Trumann School District
- CEEB code: 042455
- NCES School ID: 050004701079
- Teaching staff: 30.40 (on FTE basis)
- Grades: 8-12
- Enrollment: 453 (2023-2024)
- Student to teacher ratio: 14.90
- Education system: ADE Smart Core
- Classes offered: Regular, Advanced Placement (AP)
- Colors: Black and Old gold
- Athletics conference: 4A Region 3
- Mascot: Wildcat
- Team name: Trumann Wildcats
- Accreditation: ADE; AdvancED (1963–)
- Website: www.trumannwildcat.com/420680_2

Trumann High School is a comprehensive public high school located in the rural community of Trumann, Arkansas, United States. The school provides secondary education for students in grades 9 through 12. It is one of five public high schools in Poinsett County, Arkansas and the sole high school administered by the Trumann School District.

== Academics ==
Trumann High School is accredited by the Arkansas Department of Education (ADE) and since 1963 by AdvancED. The assumed course of study follows the Smart Core curriculum developed by the ADE, which requires students complete at least 22 units prior to graduation. Students complete regular coursework and exams and may take Advanced Placement (AP) courses and exam with the opportunity to receive college credit.

== Extracurricular activities ==
The Trumann High School mascot and athletic emblem is the Wildcat with black and old gold serving as the school colors.

=== Athletics ===
For 2012–14, the Trumann Wildcats compete in interscholastic activities within the 4A Classification via the 4A Region 3 Conference, as administered by the Arkansas Activities Association. The Wildcats field teams in football, golf (boys/girls), bowling (boys/girls), basketball (boys/girls), track and field (boys/girls), baseball, fastpitch softball, and competitive cheer.

== Notable people ==
The following are notable people associated with Trumann High School. If the person was a Trumann High School student, the number in parentheses indicates the year of graduation; if the person was a faculty or staff member, that person's title and years of association are included.

- Elbert Shelley—NFL professional football player.
