= Elbert Shelley =

American football player (born 1964)

No. 37
- Position: Safety

Personal information
- Born: December 24, 1964 (age 61); Trumann, Arkansas, U.S.
- Listed height: 5 ft 11 in (1.80 m)
- Listed weight: 190 lb (86 kg)

Career information
- High school: Trumann (Trumann, Arkansas)
- College: Arkansas State
- NFL draft: 1987: 11th round, 292nd overall pick

Career history
- Atlanta Falcons (1987–1996)

Awards and highlights
- 3× All-Pro (1992, 1993, 1995); 4× Pro Bowl (1992–1995)

Career NFL statistics
- Tackles: 53
- Interceptions: 1
- Fumble recoveries: 3
- Stats at Pro Football Reference

Elbert Vernell Shelley (born December 24, 1964) is an American former professional football player who was a safety for the Atlanta Falcons of the National Football League (NFL). He was selected by the Falcons in the 11th round of the 1987 NFL draft with the 292nd overall pick. He went to the Pro Bowl four times as a special teams player.

Shelley's hometown is Trumann, Arkansas. He was an honor student as well as a star running-back for the football team. In college Shelley was switched from running back to safety by Coach Larry Lacewell. He now lives in Georgia . He retired on Friday, June 27, 2025 after working for the Gordon County Sheriff's Department for 16 years with 13 of those years as a School Resource Officer.
