= Heth, Arkansas =

- Unincorporated community
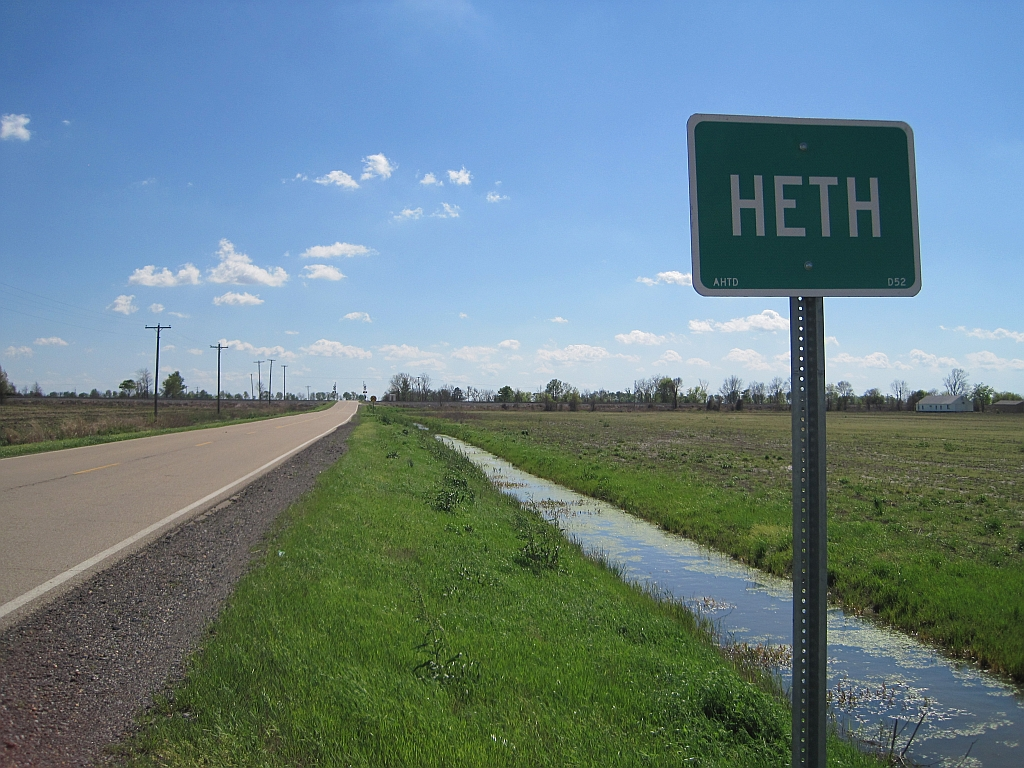

- Location within Arkansas Location within the United States
- Coordinates: 35°04′39″N 90°29′42″W
- Country: United States
- State: Arkansas
- County: St. Francis
- Elevation: 203 ft (62 m)
- Time zone: UTC-6 (Central (CST))
  - Summer (DST): UTC-5 (CDT)
- ZIP code: 72346
- Area code: 870
- GNIS feature ID: 83168

Heth is an unincorporated community in St. Francis County, Arkansas, United States. Heth is located along the Union Pacific Railroad, 9 miles (14 km) north of Hughes. Heth has a post office with ZIP code 72346.
