= Harrisburg, Arkansas =

- City
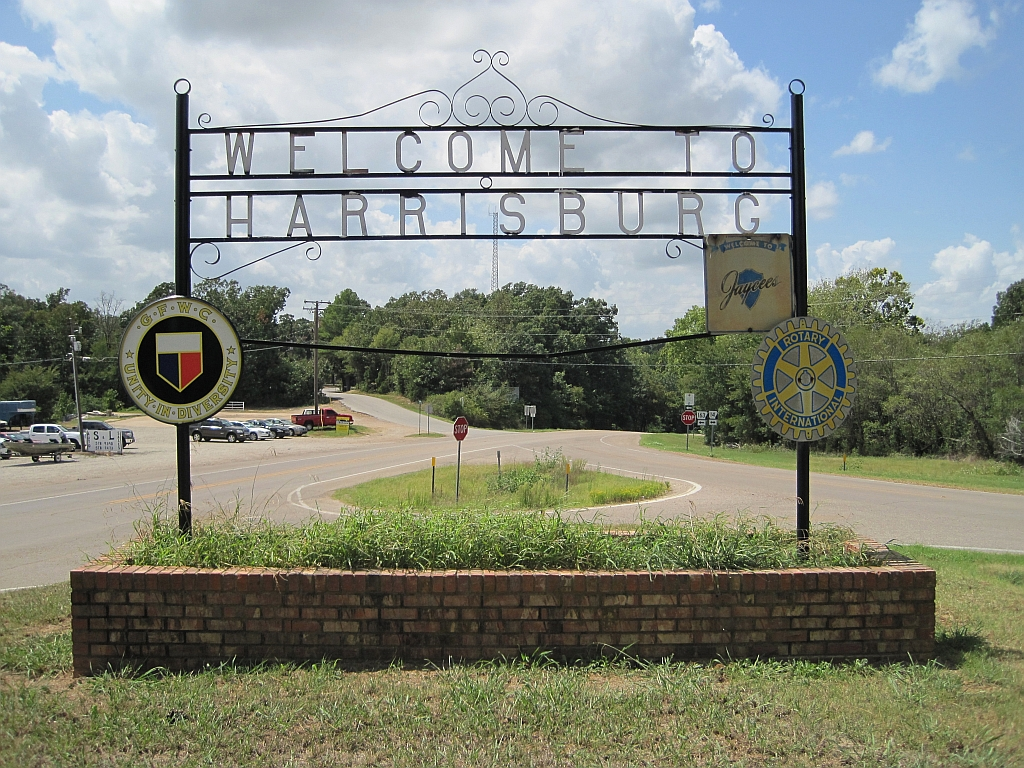

- Location in Poinsett County and the state of Arkansas
- Coordinates: 35°33′50″N 90°43′18″W
- Country: United States
- State: Arkansas
- County: Poinsett

Area
  - Total: 2.42 sq mi (6.28 km^{2})
  - Land: 2.42 sq mi (6.28 km^{2})
  - Water: 0 sq mi (0.00 km^{2})
- Elevation: 282 ft (86 m)

Population (2020)
  - Total: 2,212
  - Estimate (2025): 2,217 ▲
  - Density: 911.6/sq mi (351.97/km^{2})
- Time zone: UTC-6 (Central (CST))
  - Summer (DST): UTC-5 (CDT)
- ZIP code: 72432
- Area code: 870
- FIPS code: 05-30400
- GNIS feature ID: 2403804

Harrisburg is a city in Poinsett County, Arkansas, United States. The population was 2,212 at the 2020 census. It is included in the Jonesboro, Arkansas Metropolitan Statistical Area. The city is the county seat of Poinsett County.

== Geography ==
Harrisburg is located on Crowley's Ridge.

According to the United States Census Bureau, the city has a total area of 2.1 square miles (5.4 km^{2}), all land.

== Demographics ==
Historical population
Census	Pop.	Note	%±
1890	482		—
1900	462		−4.1%
1910	942		103.9%
1920	1,315		39.6%
1930	1,111		−15.5%
1940	1,193		7.4%
1950	1,498		25.6%
1960	1,481		−1.1%
1970	1,931		30.4%
1980	1,921		−0.5%
1990	1,943		1.1%
2000	2,192		12.8%
2010	2,288		4.4%
2020	2,212		−3.3%
2025 (est.)	2,217	▲	0.2%
U.S. Decennial Census

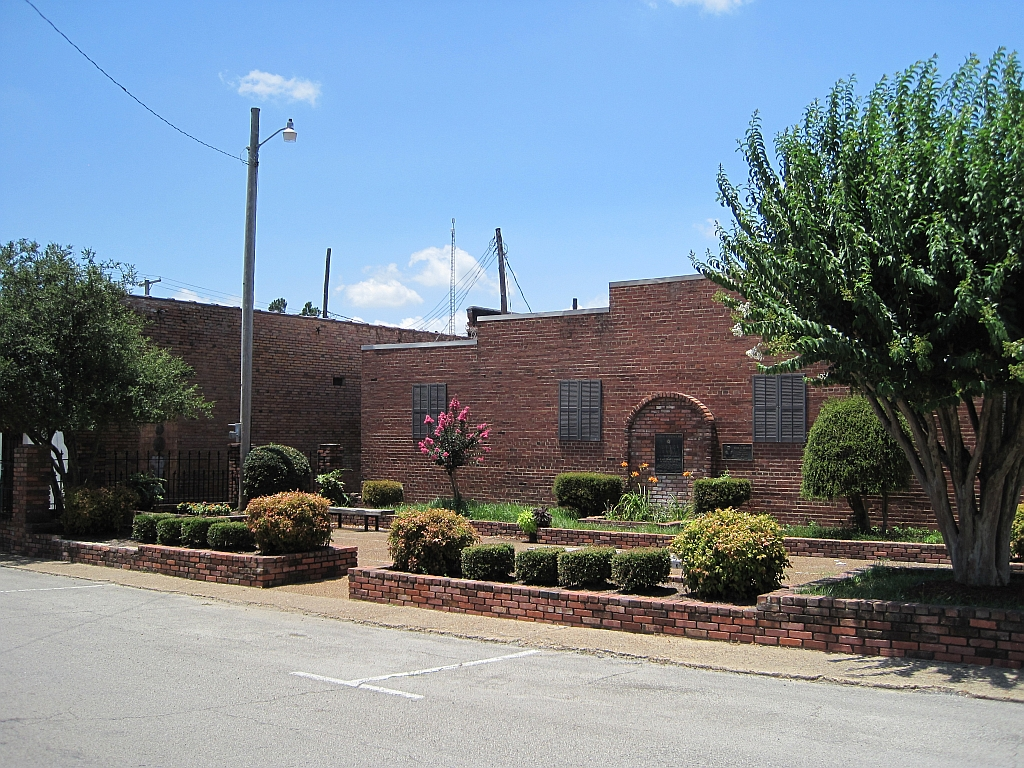
Bicentennial Park in Harrisburg, Arkansas

=== 2020 census ===
Harrisburg racial composition
Race	Number	Percentage
White (non-Hispanic)	2,016	91.14%
Black or African American (non-Hispanic)	32	1.45%
Native American	18	0.81%
Asian	5	0.23%
Other/Mixed	112	5.06%
Hispanic or Latino	29	1.31%

As of the 2020 census, Harrisburg had a population of 2,212. The median age was 39.5 years. 23.5% of residents were under the age of 18 and 19.8% of residents were 65 years of age or older. For every 100 females there were 83.6 males, and for every 100 females age 18 and over there were 76.4 males age 18 and over.

0.0% of residents lived in urban areas, while 100.0% lived in rural areas.

There were 884 households in Harrisburg, of which 33.7% had children under the age of 18 living in them. Of all households, 37.6% were married-couple households, 18.9% were households with a male householder and no spouse or partner present, and 37.8% were households with a female householder and no spouse or partner present. About 32.9% of all households were made up of individuals and 16.8% had someone living alone who was 65 years of age or older.

There were 991 housing units, of which 10.8% were vacant. The homeowner vacancy rate was 0.8% and the rental vacancy rate was 11.3%.

=== 2000 census ===
At the 2000 census there were 2,192 people in 855 households, including 582 families, in the city. The population density was 1,050.4 inhabitants per square mile (405.6/km^{2}). There were 928 housing units at an average density of 444.7 per square mile (171.7/km^{2}). The racial makeup of the city was 96.66% White, 1.24% Black or African American, 0.09% Native American, 0.27% Asian, 0.05% Pacific Islander, 0.87% from other races, and 0.82% from two or more races. 1.51% of the population were Hispanic or Latino of any race and 00.01% Other. Of the 855 households 29.0% had children under the age of 18 living with them, 49.8% were married couples living together, 15.4% had a female householder with no husband present, and 31.9% were non-families. 29.5% of households were one person and 15.2% were one person aged 65 or older. The average household size was 2.33 and the average family size was 2.84.

The age distribution was 25.1% under the age of 18, 9.9% from 18 to 24, 24.9% from 25 to 44, 22.6% from 45 to 64, and 17.5% 65 or older. The median age was 37 years. For every 100 females, there were 90.4 males. For every 100 females age 18 and over, there were 83.8 males.

The median household income was $19,862 and the median family income was $24,274. Males had a median income of $20,767 versus $18,461 for females. The per capita income for the city was $13,813. About 42.6% of families and 42.6% of the population were below the poverty line, including 26.5% of those under age 18 and 25.6% of those age 65 or over.

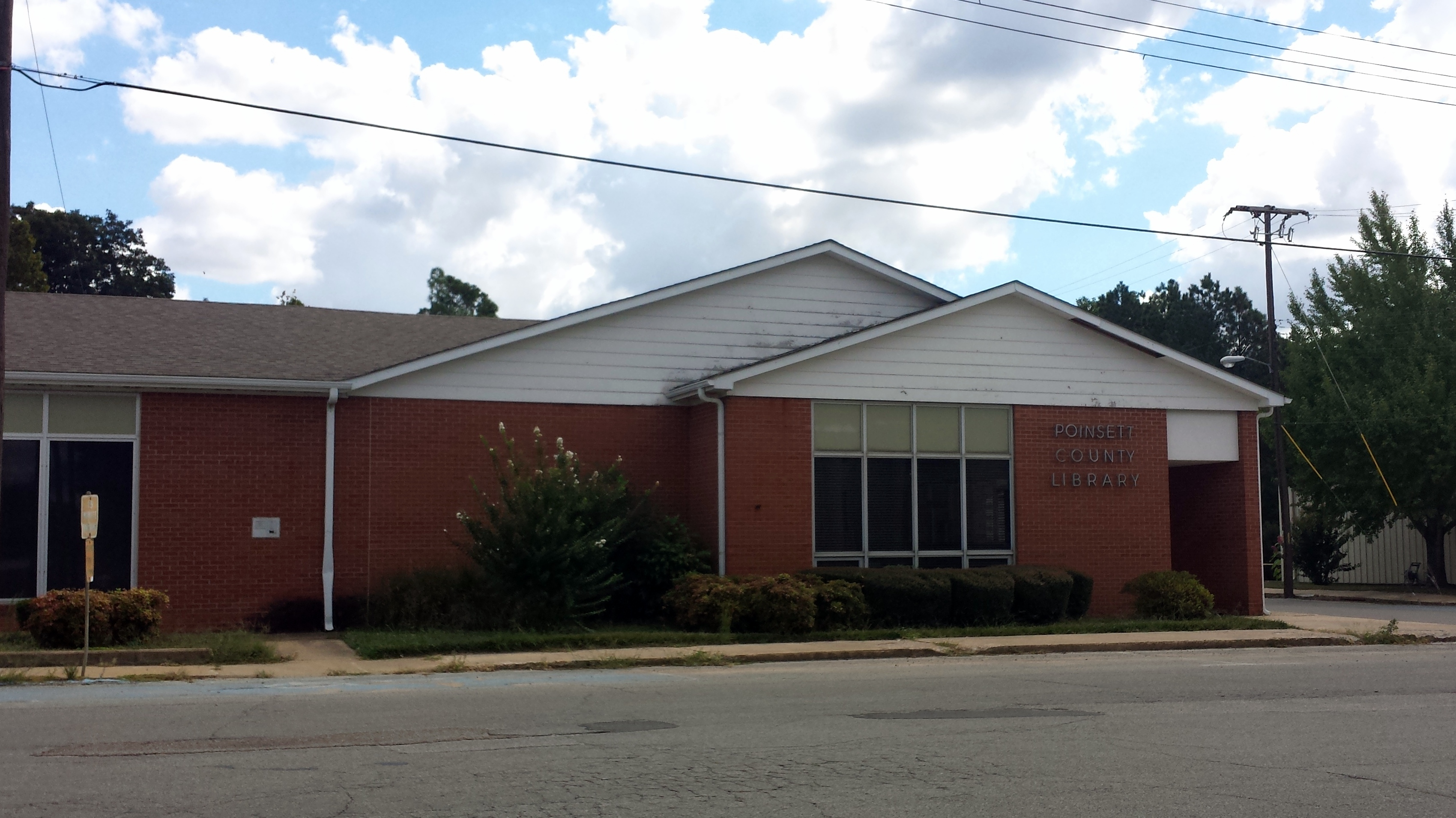
Poinsett County Library in downtown Harrisburg

== Education ==
Public education for elementary and secondary school students is available from the Harrisburg School District, which leads to graduation from Harrisburg High School.

== Notable person ==
- Ron Bass, Professional Wrestler. Born in Harrisburg.
