= Harrisburg School District (Arkansas) =

School district in Arkansas

Location
- 207 West Estes; Harrisburg, Arkansas 72432 United States

District information
- Grades: PK–12
- Established: 1897
- Accreditations: ADE; AdvancED (2009–)
- Schools: 5
- NCES District ID: 0507350

Students and staff
- Students: 1,385
- Teachers: 123.85 (on FTE basis)
- Staff: 261.85 (on FTE basis)
- Student–teacher ratio: 11.18

Other information
- Website: www.hbgsd.org

Harrisburg School District (or Harrisburg Public Schools) is an accredited public school district based in Harrisburg, Arkansas, United States. The school district encompasses 58.77 square miles (152.2 km^{2}) of land in Poinsett County, Arkansas, including Harrisburg, Fisher, Waldenburg, and Weiner.

The district from its five facilities provides comprehensive education for pre-kindergarten through grade 12 and is accredited by the Arkansas Department of Education (ADE) and has been accredited by AdvancED since 2009.

== History ==
According to the district's website, by 1897, it became evident that Harrisburg needed a new school building. A two story brick building was constructed on Brooks Street. It was a grammar school including grades one through nine. This building served school children in Harrisburg until March 1919 when a much larger two-story brick building was constructed on South Street. From September 1918 until March 3, 1919, students attended classes in churches until the new building was completed. For more than 50 years this building served as a place of education for students in the Harrisburg School District. For 30 years it was the only building on campus.

Consolidation in the Harrisburg School District began in 1945 with Greenfield District followed by Bethel, Whitehall, Wyley Crossing, Bolivar, Burrow, Pleasant View and Valley View. Average daily attendance rose from 317 in 1943-44 to 937 in 1959-51. Whitaker and Weona School District were shut down and joined the Harrisburg School System.

On July 1, 2010, Weiner School District was annexed by the Harrisburg School District.

Harrisburg School District now consists of 4 schools.

== Schools ==
Secondary schools:

- Harrisburg High School, serving more than 325 students in grades 9 through 12.
- Harrisburg Middle School, serving more than 350 students in grades 5 through 8.

Elementary schools:

- Harrisburg Elementary School, serving more than 400 students in pre-kindergarten and 4.
- Weiner Elementary School, serving more than 150 students in kindergarten through 6.

In 2012, Harrisburg Elementary received a Bronze Award in the HealthierUS School Challenge that recognizes excellence in nutrition and physical activity by the Food and Nutrition Service of the U.S. Department of Agriculture.

Weiner High School was previously a part of the district until 2013, when it closed.
