= Trumann School District =

School district in Arkansas

Location
- 221 Pine Avenue; Trumann, Arkansas 72472-2700 United States
- Coordinates: 35°40′24.1″N 90°31′3.0″W

District information
- Type: Public (government funded)
- Grades: PK-12
- Superintendent: Myra Graham
- Accreditation: Arkansas Department of Education
- Schools: 3 (1 high school, 1 middle school, 1 elementary school)
- NCES District ID: 0500047

Students and staff
- Students: 1,613
- Teachers: 119.21
- Student–teacher ratio: 13.53
- Athletic conference: 4A Region 3

Other information
- Website: www.trumannwildcat.com

Trumann School District (or Trumann Public Schools) is a public school district based in Trumann, Arkansas, United States. Trumann provides early childhood, elementary and secondary education to an average of 1,600 students with approximately 120 teachers (on a full time equivalent (FTE) basis) from its four schools at three facilities.

== History ==
The Common School District consolidated into the Trumann district on July 1, 1986.

== Schools ==
The Trumann School District consists of the following schools:

- Trumann High School (grades 9–12), located at 1620 W. Main, Trumann, Arkansas.
- Trumann Intermediate School (grades 5–8), located at 221 Pine Avenue, Trumann, Arkansas.
- Trumann Elementary School (PreKindergarten–4), located at 200 North Willow, Trumann, Arkansas.

All schools are accredited by the Arkansas Department of Education with the high school and intermediate schools accredited by AdvancED since 1963 and 1989, respectively.

== See also ==
- List of school districts in Arkansas
