= Trumann, Arkansas =

- City
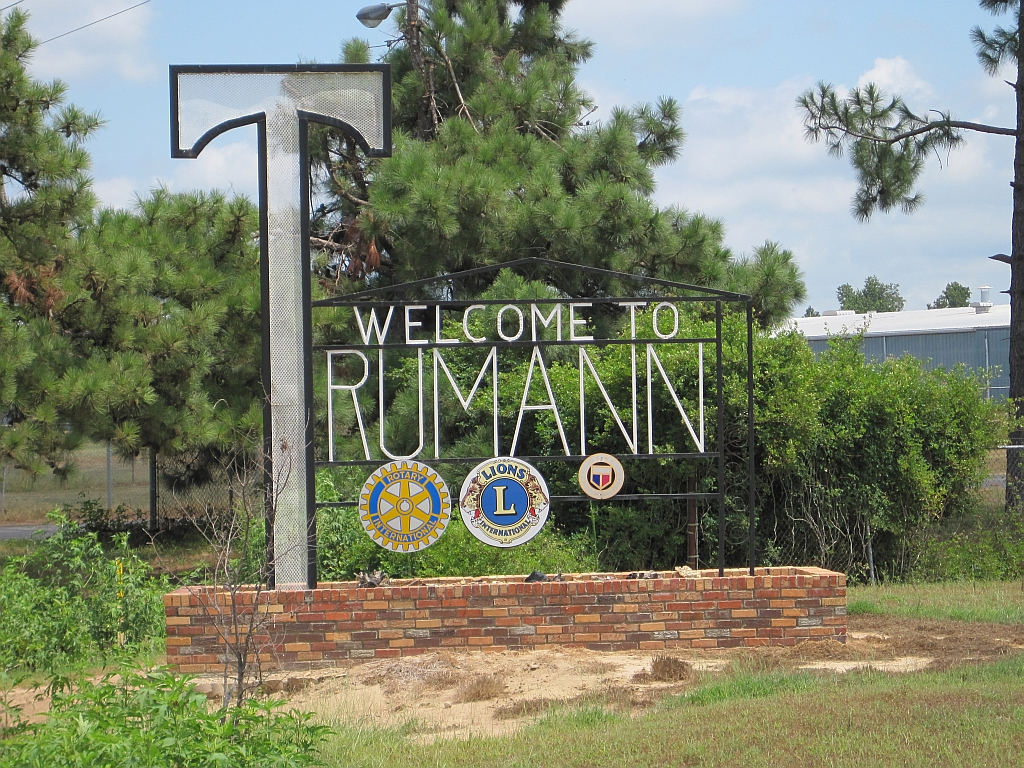

- Location of Trumann in Poinsett County, Arkansas.
- Coordinates: 35°40′15″N 90°30′40″W
- Country: United States
- State: Arkansas
- County: Poinsett

Area
  - Total: 5.80 sq mi (15.03 km^{2})
  - Land: 5.80 sq mi (15.03 km^{2})
  - Water: 0 sq mi (0.00 km^{2})
- Elevation: 223 ft (68 m)

Population (2020)
  - Total: 7,399
  - Estimate (2025): 7,527 ▲
  - Density: 1,275.3/sq mi (492.41/km^{2})
- Time zone: UTC-6 (Central (CST))
  - Summer (DST): UTC-5 (CDT)
- ZIP code: 72472
- Area code: 870
- FIPS code: 05-70010
- GNIS feature ID: 2405607
- Website: City Of Trumann

Trumann is a city in Poinsett County, Arkansas, United States. The population was 7,399 at the 2020 census. It is included in the Jonesboro metropolitan area.

== Geography ==
Trumann is located in the Arkansas Delta. According to the United States Census Bureau, the city has a total area of 4.8 square miles (12 km^{2}), all land.

Ecologically, Trumann is located within the St. Francis Lowlands ecoregion within the larger Mississippi Alluvial Plain. The St. Francis Lowlands are a flat region with fertile soil mostly covered with row crop agriculture today, though also containing sand blows and sunken lands remaining from the 1811–12 New Madrid earthquakes. Waterways have mostly been channelized, causing loss of aquatic and riparian wildlife habitat. The St. Francis Sunken Lands Wildlife Management Area, which preserves some of the bottomland hardwood forest typical of this ecoregion prior to development for row agriculture lies east of Trumann along the St. Francis River.

Interstate 555 runs through Trumann. U.S. Route 63 ran through Trumann prior to October 2021 before being rerouted.

== Demographics ==
Historical population
Census	Pop.	Note	%±
1920	2,598		—
1930	2,995		15.3%
1940	3,381		12.9%
1950	3,744		10.7%
1960	4,511		20.5%
1970	6,023		33.5%
1980	6,395		6.2%
1990	6,304		−1.4%
2000	6,889		9.3%
2010	7,243		5.1%
2020	7,399		2.2%
2025 (est.)	7,527	▲	1.7%
U.S. Decennial Census

=== 2020 census ===
As of the 2020 census, Trumann had a population of 7,399. There were 2,936 households and 1,952 families residing in the city.

The median age was 36.6 years. 26.4% of residents were under the age of 18 and 15.9% of residents were 65 years of age or older. For every 100 females there were 93.1 males, and for every 100 females age 18 and over there were 88.4 males age 18 and over.

96.4% of residents lived in urban areas, while 3.6% lived in rural areas.

Of all households, 32.7% had children under the age of 18 living in them. 39.0% were married-couple households, 19.6% were households with a male householder and no spouse or partner present, and 33.3% were households with a female householder and no spouse or partner present. About 29.7% of all households were made up of individuals, and 12.3% had someone living alone who was 65 years of age or older.

There were 3,191 housing units, of which 8.0% were vacant. The homeowner vacancy rate was 1.2% and the rental vacancy rate was 9.5%.

Trumann racial composition
Race	Number	Percentage
White (non-Hispanic)	5,938	80.25%
Black or African American (non-Hispanic)	652	8.81%
Native American	35	0.47%
Asian	40	0.54%
Other/Mixed	400	5.41%
Hispanic or Latino	334	4.51%

=== 2010 census ===
As of the census of 2010, there were 7,243 people, 2,616 households, and 1,890 families residing in the city. The population density was 1,439.7 inhabitants per square mile (555.9/km^{2}). There were 2,998 housing units at an average density of 626.5 per square mile (241.9/km^{2}). The racial makeup of the city was 94.30% White, 4.04% Black or African American, 0.28% Native American, 0.20% Asian, 0.01% Pacific Islander, 0.45% from other races, and 0.73% from two or more races. 0.81% of the population were Hispanic or Latino of any race.

There were 2,734 households, out of which 32.8% had children under the age of 18 living with them, 50.7% were married couples living together, 15.5% had a female householder with no husband present, and 30.0% were non-families. 26.6% of all households were made up of individuals, and 12.8% had someone living alone who was 65 years of age or older. The average household size was 2.49 and the average family size was 3.00.

In the city, the population was spread out, with 26.8% under the age of 18, 8.8% from 18 to 24, 26.9% from 25 to 44, 22.3% from 45 to 64, and 15.1% who were 65 years of age or older. The median age was 36 years. For every 100 females, there were 90.2 males. For every 100 females age 18 and over, there were 84.1 males.

The median income for a household in the city was $26,533, and the median income for a family was $32,297. Males had a median income of $26,196 versus $18,828 for females. The per capita income for the city was $12,419. About 17.4% of families and 21.2% of the population were below the poverty line, including 28.5% of those under age 18 and 19.4% of those age 65 or over.

== History ==
The original settlement at Trumann was a logging camp known as Mosher. Subsequently, farms sprung up as the timber was cleared and the wetlands were drained. In 1902 the name was changed to Weona. In 1917 the town was incorporated under the name Trumann.

On June 5, 2014, a derecho passed the through the town, causing extensive damage to trees and power lines. The estimated wind gust at the time of the storm was between 80 and 85 mph, with sustained winds of 75 mph.

On December 10, 2021, a tornado came through the town causing damage. It was part of a tornado outbreak that spawned multiple tornados in Missouri, Kentucky, Tennessee and Illinois that same evening.

== Business and economy ==
The agriculture and service industries make up a large share of employment in Trumann.

In 1980, the Baldwin Piano Company opened a piano manufacturing facility in Trumann. Gibson Guitar Corporation acquired the plant in 2001, and by 2006 Gibson laid off workers as they moved piano production to China. It is now completely vacant.

In 2005, the Parker Hannifin Company closed their facility which served automotive industry after more 20 years working in this City. The production lines and processes were relocated to other Parker Hannifin site located in Apodaca Nuevo León Mexico.

The Maxie Theatre was a historic movie theatre at 136 Arkansas Highway 463 South in Trumann, Arkansas.

== Government ==
Trumann uses a city council with ten council members. As of January 1, 2023, the current mayor of Trumann is Jay Paul Woods.

== Education ==
Public education of elementary and secondary school students is primarily provided by the Trumann School District, which leads to graduation from Trumann High School.

== Notable people ==
- Carl E. Bailey, governor of Arkansas from 1937 to 1941,
- Joe Hollimon, CFL Football player for the Edmonton Eskimos 1976-1985
- Elbert Shelley, NFL Football player for the Atlanta Falcons 1987 to 1996

=== List of highways ===
- Interstate 555
- AR 69
- AR 198
- AR 212
- AR 463
