= Weiner, Arkansas =

- City
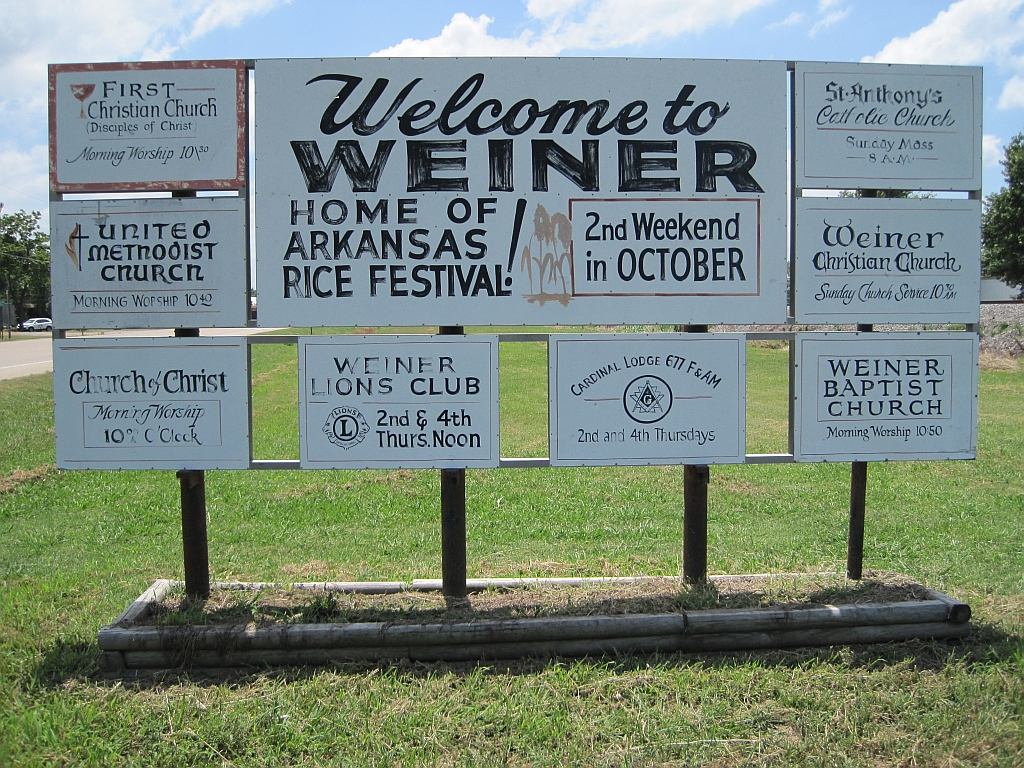

- Location of Weiner in Poinsett County, Arkansas.
- Coordinates: 35°37′22″N 90°54′19″W
- Country: United States
- State: Arkansas
- County: Poinsett

Area
  - Total: 1.36 sq mi (3.53 km^{2})
  - Land: 1.36 sq mi (3.53 km^{2})
  - Water: 0 sq mi (0.00 km^{2})
- Elevation: 243 ft (74 m)

Population (2020)
  - Total: 647
  - Estimate (2025): 613 ▼
  - Density: 474.2/sq mi (183.09/km^{2})
- Time zone: UTC-6 (Central (CST))
  - Summer (DST): UTC-5 (CDT)
- ZIP code: 72479
- Area code: 870
- FIPS code: 05-73940
- GNIS feature ID: 2405702
- Website: www.cityofweiner.com

Weiner is a city in Poinsett County, Arkansas, United States. The population was 647 at the 2020 census. It is included in the Jonesboro, Arkansas Metropolitan Statistical Area.

== Geography ==
According to the United States Census Bureau, the city has a total area of 1.4 square miles (3.6 km^{2}), all land.

== Education ==
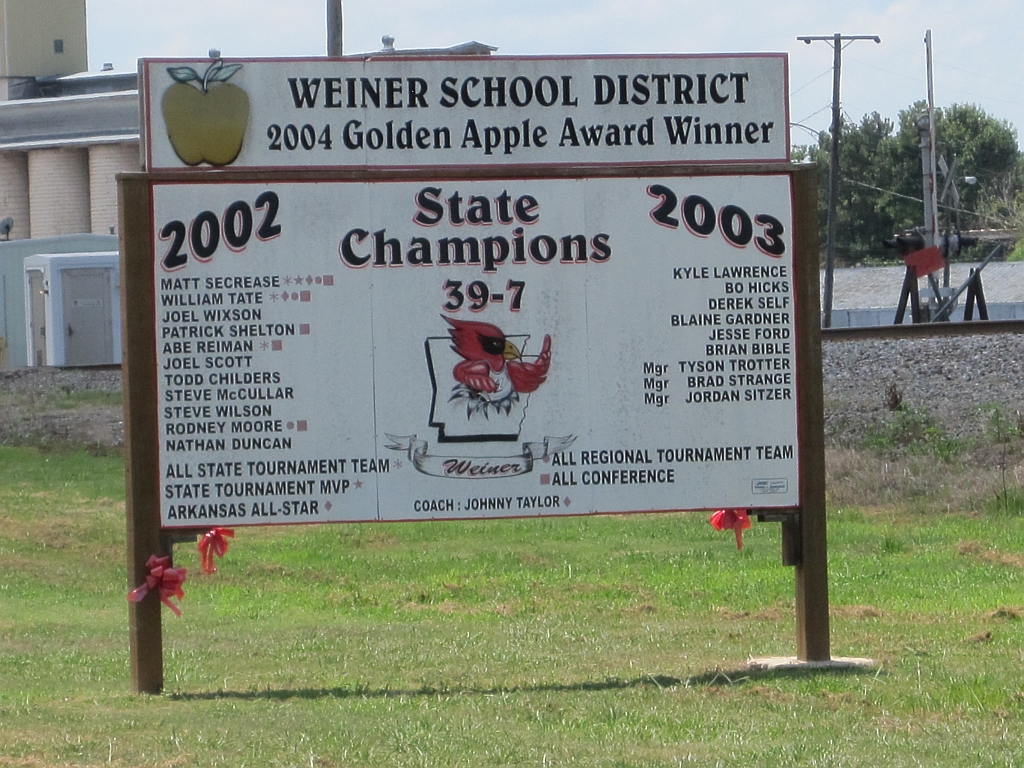
Weiner School District sign

Weiner is served by the Harrisburg School District. Weiner Elementary School is located in the city. Residents are also zoned to Harrisburg Middle School and Harrisburg High School.

On July 1, 2010, the Weiner School District consolidated into the Harrisburg School District. Weiner High School, then under the Harrisburg school district, closed in 2013.

== Demographics ==
Historical population
Census	Pop.	Note	%±
1910	232		—
1920	412		77.6%
1930	537		30.3%
1940	447		−16.8%
1950	644		44.1%
1960	669		3.9%
1970	715		6.9%
1980	750		4.9%
1990	655		−12.7%
2000	760		16.0%
2010	716		−5.8%
2020	647		−9.6%
2025 (est.)	613	▼	−5.3%
U.S. Decennial Census

=== 2020 census ===
Weiner racial composition
Race	Number	Percentage
White (non-Hispanic)	583	90.11%
Black or African American (non-Hispanic)	12	1.85%
Asian	2	0.31%
Other/Mixed	16	2.47%
Hispanic or Latino	34	5.26%

As of the 2020 United States census, there were 647 people, 337 households, and 239 families residing in the city.

=== 2000 census ===
At the 2000 census there were 760 people, 306 households, and 217 families residing in Weiner. The population density was 551.4 inhabitants per square mile (212.9/km^{2}). There were 337 housing units at an average density of 244.5 per square mile (94.4/km^{2}). The racial makeup of Weiner was 98.55% White, 0.53% Black or African American, 0.39% Native American and 0.53% Asian. 0.66% of the population were Hispanic or Latino of any race. Of the 306 households 33.5% had children under the age of 18 living with them, 57.5% were married couples living together, 2.0% had a female householder with no husband present, and 2.0% were non-families. 3.0.5% of households were one person and 2.0% were one person aged 65 or older. The average household size was 2.48 and the average family size was 2.98.

The age distribution was 25.0% under the age of 18, 8.6% from 18 to 24, 28.7% from 25 to 44, 21.3% from 45 to 64, and 16.4% 65 or older. The median age was 37 years. For every 100 females, there were 97.4 males. For every 100 females age 18 and over, there were 90.0 males.

The median household income was in Weiner was $32,125, and the median family income was $42,222. Males had a median income of $25,789 versus $20,804 for females. The per capita income for the city was $18,222. About 6.7% of families and 9.3% of the population were below the poverty line, including 9.4% of those under age 18 and 12.4% of those age 65 or over.

== Gallery ==
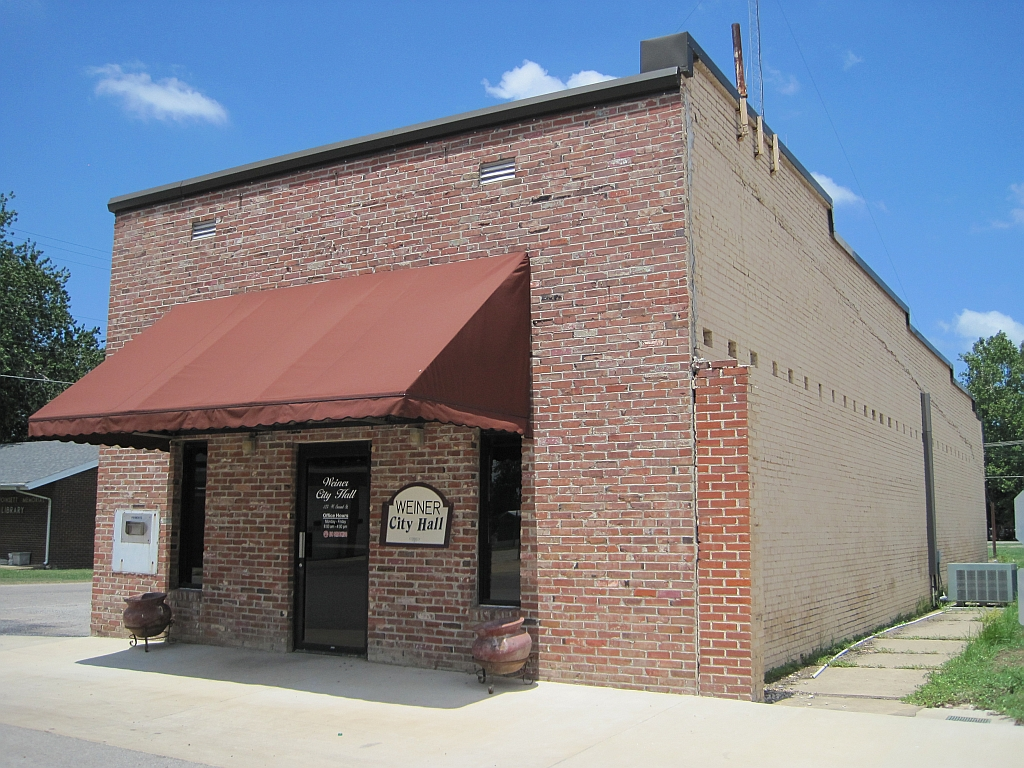
City Hall

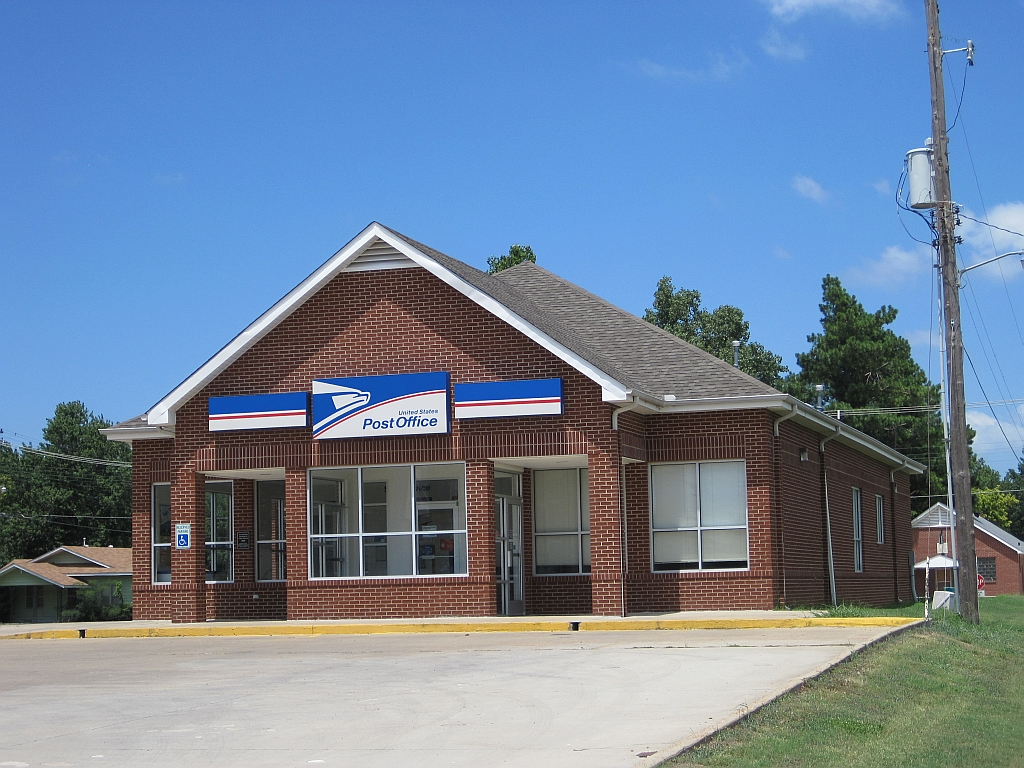
Post Office

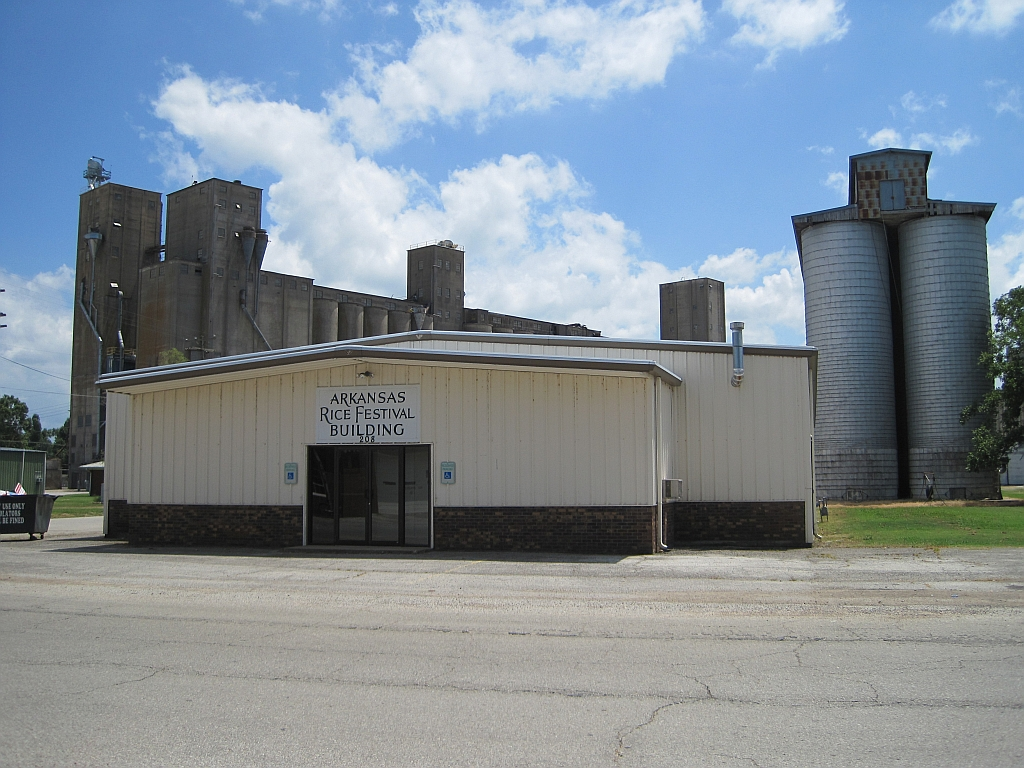
Rice Festival Building

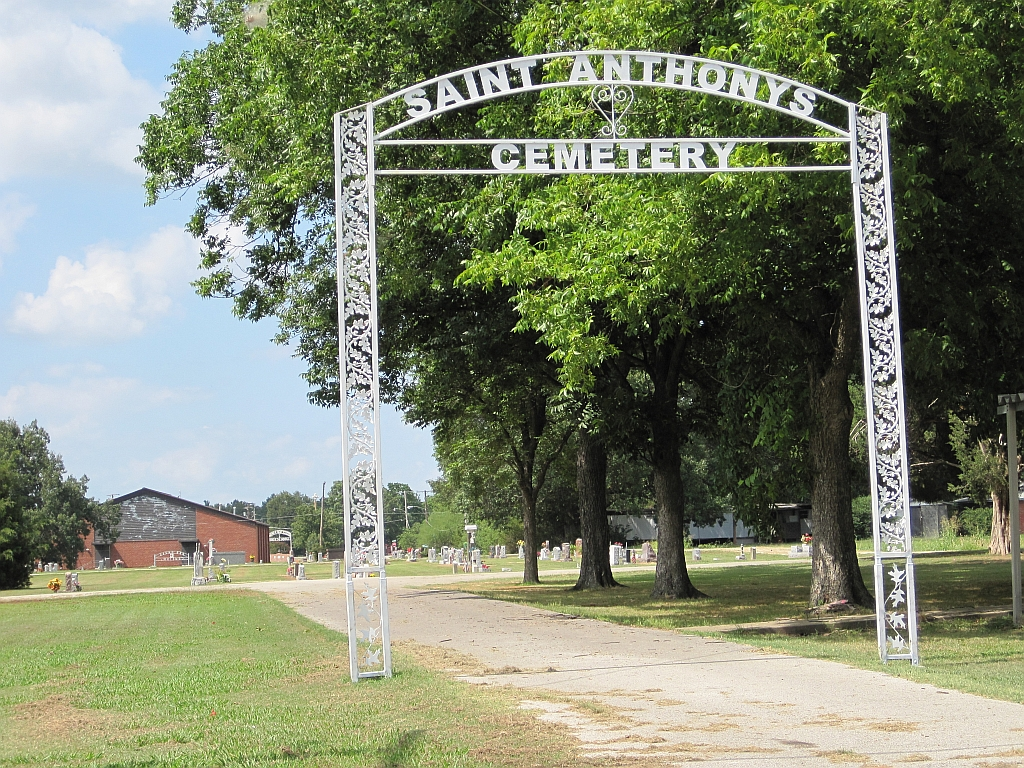
St. Anthony's Cemetery
