= Weiner School District =

Defunct school district in Arkansas, United States

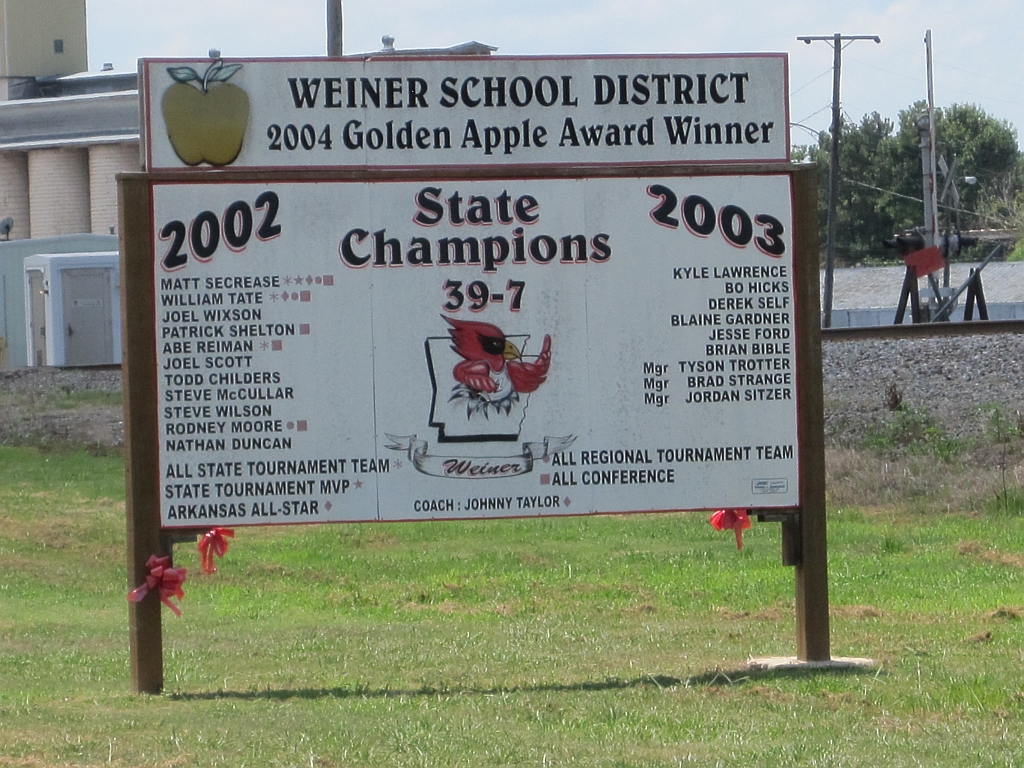

Location
- Weiner, Arkansas; United States

District information
- Closed: 2010 (consolidated into Harrisburg School District)

Weiner School District or Weiner Public Schools was a school district headquartered in Weiner, Arkansas, United States. It operated Weiner Elementary School and Weiner High School.

== History ==
By 2010 the student population of the Weiner district had fallen below 350, which required the district to be merged into another district under Arkansas law. That year the Weiner district and the Delight School District, another school district under the 350 student limit, attempted a voluntary merger, but the Arkansas Board of Education declined on the grounds of the two districts being too far apart. Delight instead ultimately merged with the Murfreesboro School District to form the South Pike County School District.

On July 1, 2010, the Weiner district consolidated into the Harrisburg School District.
