= Poinsett County, Arkansas =

County in Arkansas, United States

- County
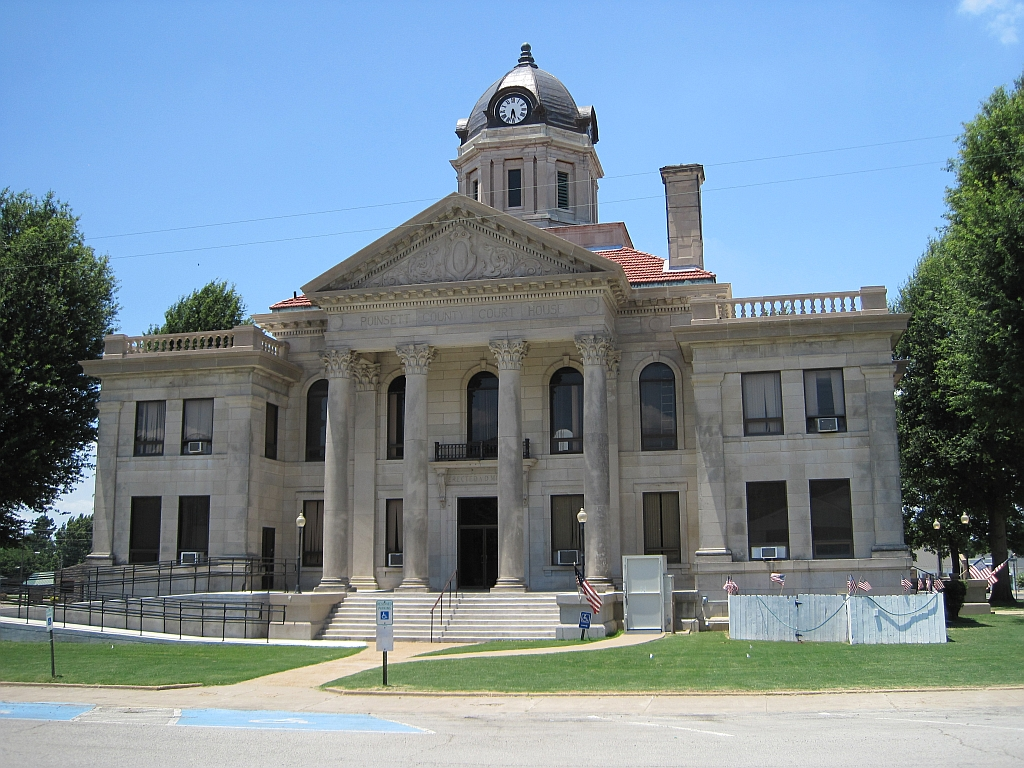
- Poinsett County Courthouse, June 2011

- Location within the U.S. state of Arkansas
- Coordinates: 35°34′17″N 90°39′36″W
- Country: United States
- State: Arkansas
- Founded: February 28, 1838
- Named for: Joel Roberts Poinsett
- Seat: Harrisburg
- Largest city: Trumann

Area
  - Total: 763 sq mi (1,980 km^{2})
  - Land: 758 sq mi (1,960 km^{2})
  - Water: 5.2 sq mi (13 km^{2}) 0.7%

Population (2020)
  - Total: 22,965
  - Estimate (2025): 22,483 ▼
  - Density: 30.3/sq mi (11.7/km^{2})
- Time zone: UTC−6 (Central)
  - Summer (DST): UTC−5 (CDT)
- Congressional district: 1st
- Website: www.poinsettar.gov

Poinsett County is a county located in the U.S. state of Arkansas. As of the 2020 census, the population was 22,965. The county seat is Harrisburg. Poinsett County is included in the Jonesboro–Paragould Combined Statistical Area.

== History ==
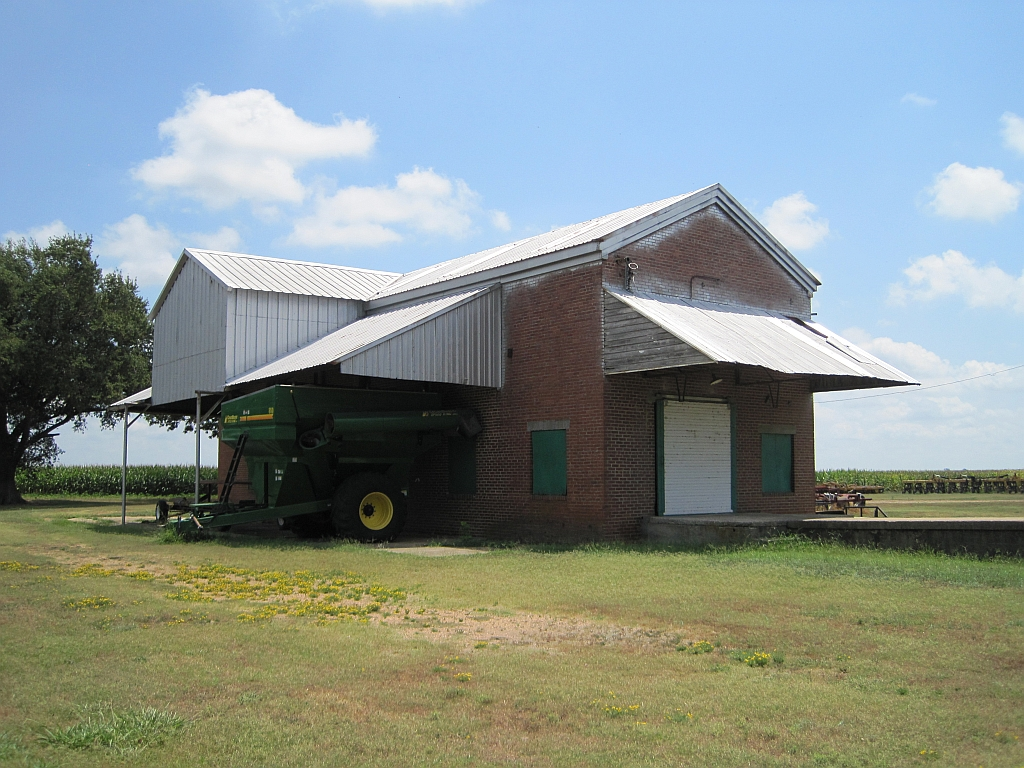
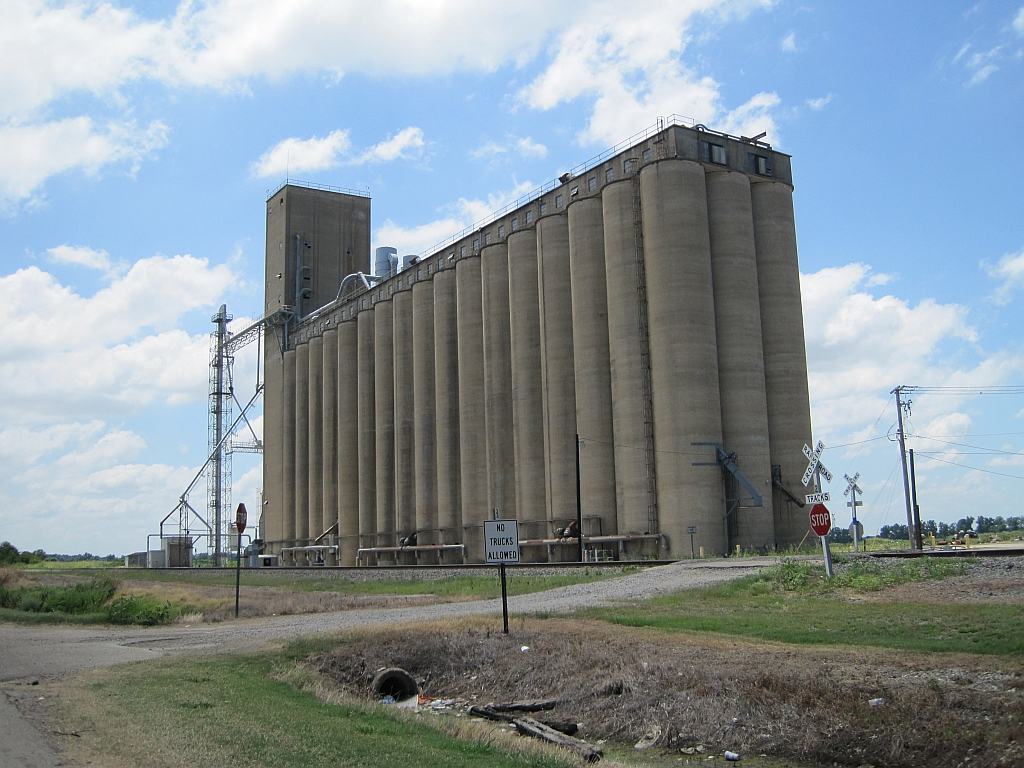
Cotton gins, such as the Judd Hill Cotton Gin, and rice dryers, such as the Hubbard Rice Dryer, have been historically vital to the economy of Poinsett County. Both properties are listed on the National Register of Historic Places.

Poinsett County was formed on February 28, 1838, and named for Joel Roberts Poinsett, U.S. Secretary of War. County business was initially conducted in the county judge's home until first court was held in Bolivar, upon completion of a courthouse in 1839. In 1859, the county seat was moved to the more centrally located town of Harrisburg, where it still remains. Poinsett County acquired its current boundaries in the years following this change, as portions were assigned to newly organized counties.

The northern portion became Craighead County, and the south portion became Cross County. Sunken lands were added to eastern Poinsett County during this time, including Lepanto and Marked Tree.

The Civil War devastated the county financially. It did not recover until the railroads were constructed into the area, giving farmers a new avenue to market their crops, and the timber industry developed. The Texas and St. Louis Railway completed track through Weiner and the St. Louis and Iron Mountain Railway ran through the center of the county in 1882. The Kansas City, Ft. Scott, and Gulf Railroad opened service in east Poinsett County the following year. Shipping timber had become feasible and was undertaken throughout northeast Arkansas following the completion of railroads. Farmers used the railroads to ship their cotton and farm animals to new markets. Many small railroad towns boomed during this period. Despite this uplift, the county's population mostly consisted of poor sharecroppers and tenant farmers, with an elite class of white landowners.

Poinsett County was the hardest hit county by the Great Mississippi Flood of 1927, which flooded thousands of fields and destroyed homes countywide. The Southern Tenant Farmers Union was founded in 1935 in Tyronza during the Great Depression. The organization was an interracial union to improve the pay and working conditions of poor sharecroppers. It met violent resistance from white planters, with union leaders and members attacked and some killed throughout its areas of organizing in Arkansas and Mississippi. The Southern Tenant Farmers Union Museum in Tyronza is operated by Arkansas State University.

== Geography ==
According to the U.S. Census Bureau, the county has a total area of 764 square miles (1,980 km^{2}), of which 758 square miles (1,960 km^{2}) is land and 5.2 square miles (13 km^{2}) (0.7%) is water. Located in Arkansas's northeast corner, the county is bisected by Crowley's Ridge and the L'Anguille River which both pass north–south through the county. The soils in the eastern part of the county have been deposited by the Mississippi River and are mostly used for cotton farming. Western Poinsett County is generally dedicated to rice fields. Lake Poinsett State Park is centrally located within the county.

=== Major highways ===
- Interstate 555
- U.S. Highway 49 / U.S. Highway 63
- Highway 1
- Highway 14
- Highway 18
- Highway 69
- Highway 75
- Highway 118
- Highway 135
- Highway 136
- Highway 140
- Highway 149
- Highway 158
- Highway 163
- Highway 198
- Highway 214
- Highway 308
- Highway 322
- Highway 373
- Highway 463
- Highway 956

=== Adjacent counties ===
- Craighead County (north)
- Mississippi County (east)
- Crittenden County (southeast)
- Cross County (south)
- Jackson County (west)

== Demographics ==
Historical population
Census	Pop.	Note	%±
1840	1,320		—
1850	2,308		74.8%
1860	3,621		56.9%
1870	1,720		−52.5%
1880	2,192		27.4%
1890	4,272		94.9%
1900	7,025		64.4%
1910	12,791		82.1%
1920	20,848		63.0%
1930	29,695		42.4%
1940	37,670		26.9%
1950	39,311		4.4%
1960	30,834		−21.6%
1970	26,822		−13.0%
1980	27,032		0.8%
1990	24,664		−8.8%
2000	25,614		3.9%
2010	24,583		−4.0%
2020	22,965		−6.6%
2025 (est.)	22,483	▼	−2.1%
U.S. Decennial Census; 1790–1960 1900–1990; 1990–2000 2010

=== 2020 census ===
As of the 2020 census, the county had a population of 22,965. The median age was 41.0 years. 23.7% of residents were under the age of 18 and 18.6% of residents were 65 years of age or older. For every 100 females there were 95.1 males, and for every 100 females age 18 and over there were 92.1 males age 18 and over.

The racial makeup of the county was 84.4% White, 7.8% Black or African American, 0.4% American Indian and Alaska Native, 0.3% Asian, less than 0.1% Native Hawaiian and Pacific Islander, 2.0% from some other race, and 5.1% from two or more races. Hispanic or Latino residents of any race comprised 3.6% of the population.

31.5% of residents lived in urban areas, while 68.5% lived in rural areas.

There were 9,254 households in the county, of which 30.9% had children under the age of 18 living in them. Of all households, 43.2% were married-couple households, 20.0% were households with a male householder and no spouse or partner present, and 30.1% were households with a female householder and no spouse or partner present. About 29.3% of all households were made up of individuals and 13.5% had someone living alone who was 65 years of age or older.

There were 10,327 housing units, of which 10.4% were vacant. Among occupied housing units, 63.9% were owner-occupied and 36.1% were renter-occupied. The homeowner vacancy rate was 1.3% and the rental vacancy rate was 10.2%.

=== 2000 census ===
As of the 2000 census, there were 25,614 people, 10,026 households, and 7,228 families residing in the county. The population density was 34 inhabitants per square mile (13/km^{2}). There were 11,051 housing units at an average density of 15 per square mile (5.8/km^{2}). The racial makeup of the county was 90.98% White, 7.13% Black or African American, 0.23% Native American, 0.16% Asian, 0.02% Pacific Islander, 0.74% from other races, and 0.75% from two or more races. 1.43% of the population were Hispanic or Latino of any race.

There were 10,026 households, out of which 32.60% had children under the age of 18 living with them, 54.60% were married couples living together, 13.20% had a female householder with no husband present, and 27.90% were non-families. 24.80% of all households were made up of individuals, and 11.70% had someone living alone who was 65 years of age or older. The average household size was 2.52 and the average family size was 2.99.

In the county, the population was spread out, with 26.10% under the age of 18, 8.90% from 18 to 24, 27.10% from 25 to 44, 23.70% from 45 to 64, and 14.30% who were 65 years of age or older. The median age was 37 years. For every 100 females, there were 94.60 males. For every 100 females age 18 and over, there were 90.30 males.

The median income for a household in the county was $26,558, and the median income for a family was $32,257. Males had a median income of $26,633 versus $19,199 for females. The per capita income for the county was $13,087. About 17.60% of families and 21.20% of the population were below the poverty line, including 28.60% of those under age 18 and 20.50% of those age 65 or over.

== Government ==
The county government is a constitutional body granted specific powers by the Constitution of Arkansas and the Arkansas Code. The quorum court is the legislative branch of the county government and controls all spending and revenue collection. Representatives are called justices of the peace and are elected from county districts every even-numbered year. The number of districts in a county vary from nine to fifteen, and district boundaries are drawn by the county election commission. The Poinsett County Quorum Court has eleven members. Presiding over quorum court meetings is the county judge, who serves as the chief executive officer of the county. The county judge is elected at-large and does not vote in quorum court business, although capable of vetoing quorum court decisions.

Poinsett County, Arkansas Elected countywide officials
Position	Officeholder	Party
County Judge	J.C. Carter	Republican
County Clerk	Teresa Rouse	Republican
Circuit Clerk	Misty Russell	Republican
Sheriff/Collector	Kevin Molder	Republican
Treasurer	Tammie Stanford	Republican
Assessor	Josh Bradley	Republican
Coroner	Butch Davis	Republican

The composition of the Quorum Court after the 2024 elections is 10 Republicans and 1 Democrat. Justices of the Peace (members) of the Quorum Court following the elections are:

- District 1: Randy L. Jones (R)
- District 2: Elizabeth Thweatt Schwarz (D)
- District 3: Hunter Jones (R)
- District 4: Ron Martin (R)
- District 5: James Baker (R)
- District 6: Larry Fowler (R)
- District 7: Donnie Taylor (R)
- District 8: Jordan A. Looney (R)
- District 9: Jerry Carter (R)
- District 10: Steve Jernigan (R)
- District 11: Harold Blackwood (R)

Additionally, the townships of Poinsett County are entitled to elect their own respective constables, as set forth by the Constitution of Arkansas. Constables are largely of historical significance as they were used to keep the peace in rural areas when travel was more difficult. The township constables as of the 2024 elections are:

- Scott: Thomas Carlock (Ind.)
- Tyronza: Scottie Blagg (R)
- Willis: Rodney Stotts (R)

Poinsett County generally voted Democratic until, in 2008, it voted Republican for only the third time in the past century; in the four elections since then it has also gone Republican.

United States presidential election results for Poinsett County, Arkansas
Year	Republican		Democratic		Third party(ies)	
Year	No.	%	No.	%	No.	%
1896	130	18.26%	572	80.34%	10	1.40%
1900	180	25.64%	520	74.07%	2	0.28%
1904	310	33.37%	599	64.48%	20	2.15%
1908	462	35.13%	843	64.11%	10	0.76%
1912	205	18.96%	593	54.86%	283	26.18%
1916	511	30.33%	1,174	69.67%	0	0.00%
1920	633	32.93%	1,201	62.49%	88	4.58%
1924	393	22.81%	1,182	68.60%	148	8.59%
1928	1,182	33.60%	2,324	66.06%	12	0.34%
1932	252	5.44%	4,312	93.01%	72	1.55%
1936	563	13.90%	3,457	85.38%	29	0.72%
1940	670	13.91%	4,138	85.90%	9	0.19%
1944	311	11.04%	2,506	88.93%	1	0.04%
1948	435	11.75%	2,415	65.24%	852	23.01%
1952	2,010	31.80%	4,303	68.07%	8	0.13%
1956	2,117	35.25%	3,817	63.55%	72	1.20%
1960	2,430	44.64%	2,817	51.75%	197	3.62%
1964	3,031	34.92%	5,635	64.93%	13	0.15%
1968	2,140	27.14%	1,672	21.20%	4,074	51.66%
1972	7,010	77.91%	1,908	21.20%	80	0.89%
1976	2,726	28.50%	6,835	71.45%	5	0.05%
1980	4,040	44.01%	4,894	53.31%	246	2.68%
1984	5,622	58.64%	3,906	40.74%	59	0.62%
1988	3,644	48.16%	3,873	51.19%	49	0.65%
1992	2,425	28.29%	5,341	62.31%	805	9.39%
1996	2,034	27.39%	4,686	63.09%	707	9.52%
2000	2,988	41.30%	4,102	56.70%	145	2.00%
2004	3,555	46.03%	4,069	52.69%	99	1.28%
2008	4,903	61.84%	2,742	34.59%	283	3.57%
2012	4,974	65.79%	2,390	31.61%	196	2.59%
2016	5,502	71.25%	1,880	24.35%	340	4.40%
2020	5,918	78.69%	1,424	18.93%	179	2.38%
2024	5,731	80.96%	1,235	17.45%	113	1.60%

== Education ==
=== Public education ===
Early childhood, elementary and secondary education is available from four school districts listed from largest to smallest based on student population:

- Trumann School District based in Trumann with four facilities serving more than 1,600 students.
- Harrisburg School District based in Harrisburg with five facilities and serving more than 1,300 students.
- East Poinsett County School District based in Lepanto with three facilities serving more than 750 students.
- Marked Tree School District based in Marked Tree with three facilities serving more than 650 students.

=== Libraries ===
Poinsett County is served with central and branch libraries from two library systems, the Crowley Ridge Regional Library System and Trumann Library System.

== Communities ==
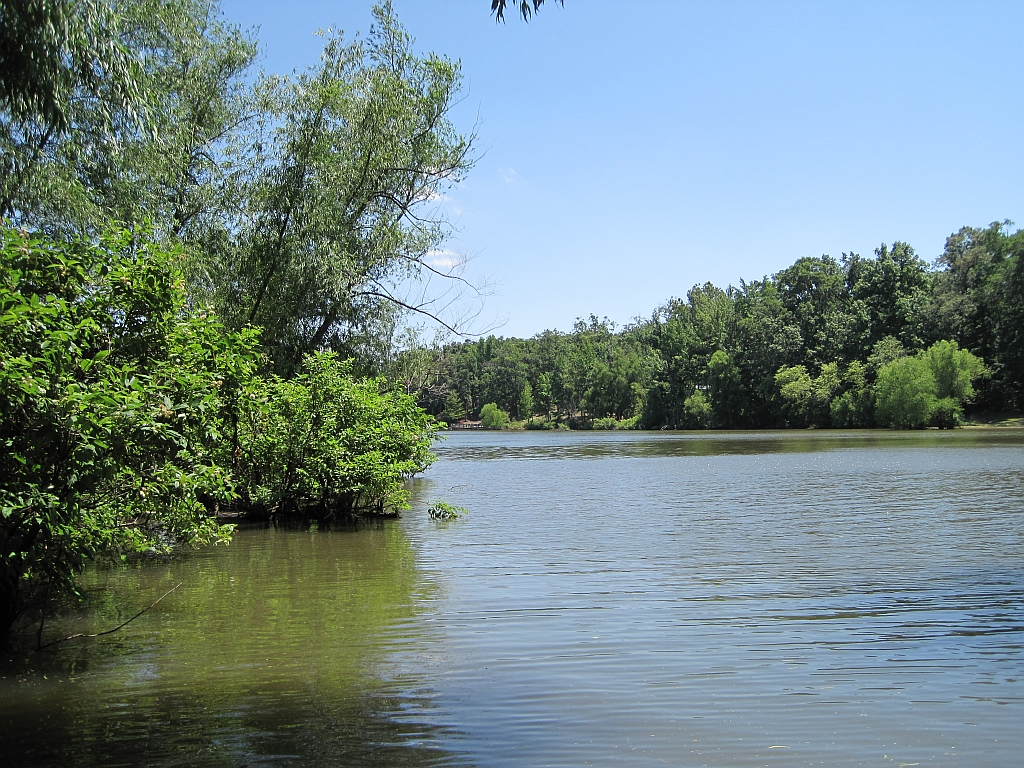
Lake Poinsett within Lake Poinsett State Park, June 2011

=== Cities ===
- Fisher
- Harrisburg (county seat)
- Lepanto
- Marked Tree
- Trumann
- Tyronza
- Weiner

=== Town ===
- Waldenburg

=== Census-designated place ===
- Payneway
- Rivervale

=== Unincorporated communities ===
- Greenfield

=== Townships ===
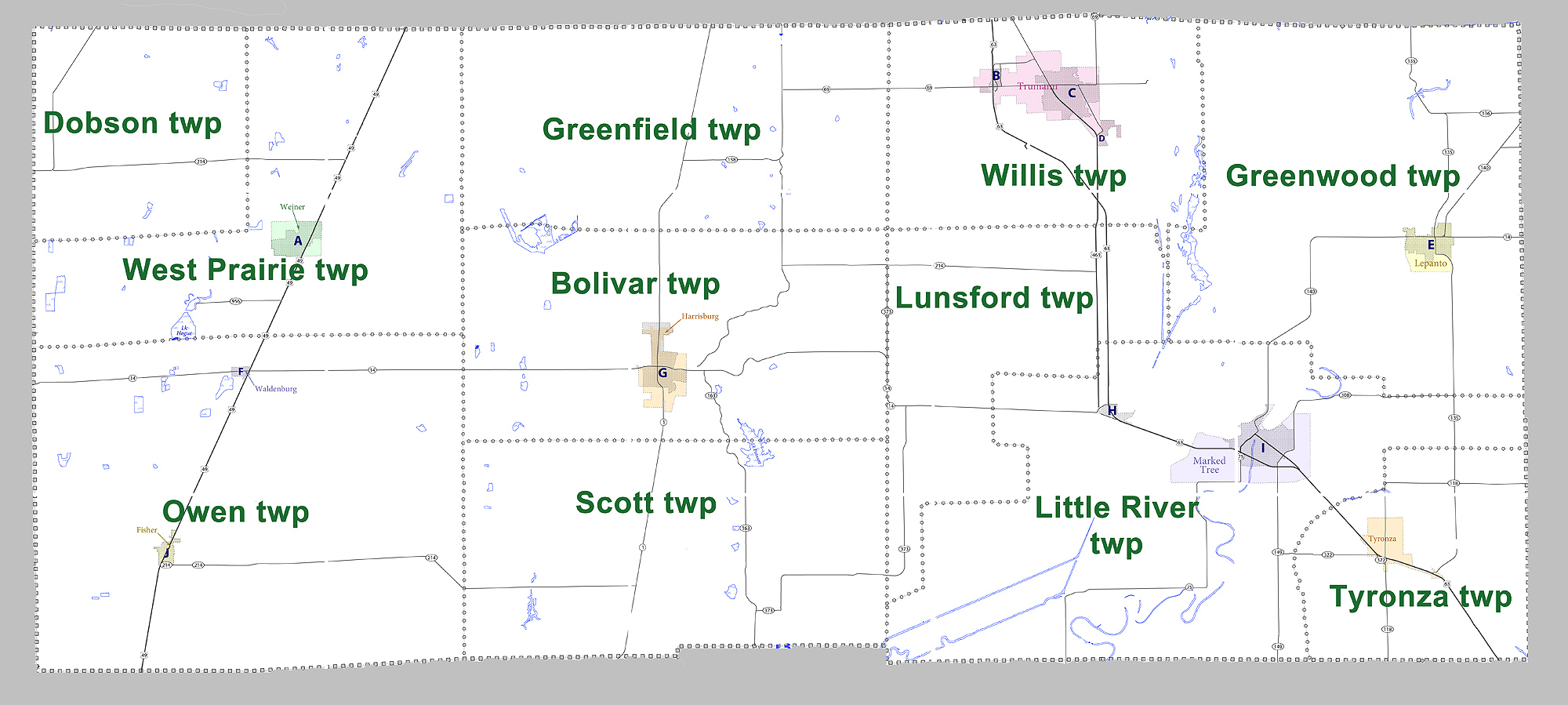
Townships in Poinsett County, Arkansas as of 2010

Townships in Arkansas are the divisions of a county. Each township includes unincorporated areas; some may have incorporated cities or towns within part of their boundaries. Arkansas townships have limited purposes in modern times. However, the United States census does list Arkansas population based on townships (sometimes referred to as "county subdivisions" or "minor civil divisions"). Townships are also of value for historical purposes in terms of genealogical research. Each town or city is within one or more townships in an Arkansas county based on census maps and publications. The townships of Poinsett County are listed below; listed in parentheses are the cities, towns, and/or census-designated places that are fully or partially inside the township.

- Boliver (Harrisburg)
- Dobson
- Greenfield
- Greenwood (Lepanto)
- Little River (Marked Tree)
- Lunsford
- Owen (Fisher, Waldenburg)
- Scott
- Tyronza (Tyronza)
- West Prairie (Weiner)
- Willis (Trumann)

== See also ==
- Arkansas Highway 308 (1973–1979), former state highway southwest of Marked Tree
- List of lakes in Poinsett County, Arkansas
- National Register of Historic Places listings in Poinsett County, Arkansas
