= Jonesboro–Paragould combined statistical area =

Statistical Area

Coordinates: 35°58′N 90°35′W

Jonesboro–Paragould, Ark.
- Combined Statistical Area
- Jonesboro–Paragould, AR; Combined Statistical Area
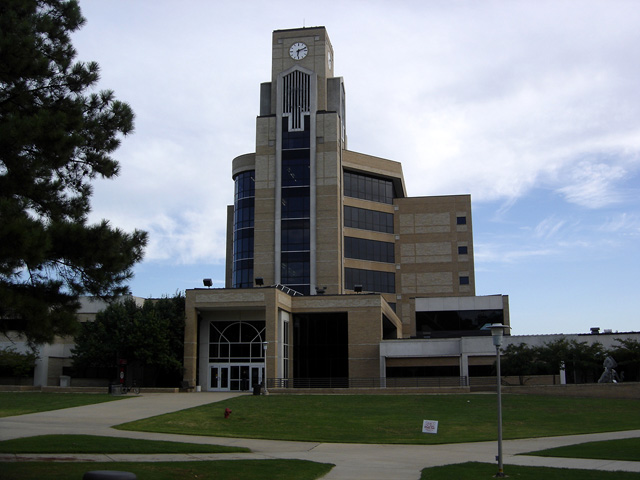
- Dean B. Ellis Library at Arkansas State University
Components of the Jonesboro–Paragould CSA
Jonesboro MSA
City of Jonesboro
Paragould μSA
City of Paragould
- Country: United States
- State: Arkansas
- Counties: Craighead; Greene; Poinsett
- Principal cities: Jonesboro; Paragould
- Time zone: UTC-6 (CST)
  - Summer (DST): UTC-5 (CDT)

The Jonesboro–Paragould Combined Statistical Area is made up of three counties in northeastern Arkansas. The CSA consists of the Jonesboro Metropolitan Statistical Area and the Paragould Micropolitan Statistical Area. The CSA was created by the Census Bureau in 2005. As of the 2020 census, the CSA had a population of 183,113. (2026 estimates have it ~190,100)

== Counties ==
- Craighead
- Greene
- Poinsett

== Cities and towns ==
=== Places with more than 75,000 inhabitants ===
- Jonesboro (Principal city) Pop: 82,491

=== Places with more than 25,000 inhabitants ===
- Paragould (Principal city) Pop: 31,261

=== Places with 1,000 to 10,000 inhabitants ===
- Trumann Pop: 7,480
- Marked Tree Pop: 2,178
- Harrisburg Pop: 2,211
- Bono Pop: 3,011
- Lake City Pop:2,815
- Lepanto Pop: 1,611
- Bay Pop: 2,392
- Brookland Pop: 4,853
- Monette Pop: 1,662
- Caraway Pop: 1,074
- Marmaduke Pop: 1,291

=== Places with less than 1,000 inhabitants ===
- Oak Grove Heights Pop: 889
- Tyronza Pop: 762
- Weiner Pop: 716
- Lafe Pop: 458
- Cash Pop: 342
- Fisher Pop: 273
- Black Oak Pop: 262
- Delaplaine Pop: 116
- Egypt Pop: 112
- Waldenburg Pop: 61

=== Unincorporated places ===
- Beech Grove
- Bowman
- Brighton
- Fontaine
- Greene High
- Greenfield
- Halliday
- Herman
- Hooker
- Light
- Lorado
- Lunsford
- Otwell
- Payneway
- Pitts
- Rivervale
- Stacy
- Stonewall
- Walcott
- Whitehall
- Goobertown

== Demographics ==
As of the census of 2000, there were 145,093 people, 57,077 households, and 40,029 families residing within the CSA. The racial makeup of the CSA was 91.68% White, 5.70% African American, 0.34% Native American, 0.41% Asian, 0.02% Pacific Islander, 0.78% from other races, and 1.08% from two or more races. Hispanic or Latino of any race were 1.75% of the population.

The median income for a household in the CSA was $29,937, and the median income for a family was $36,754. Males had a median income of $28,178 versus $20,228 for females. The per capita income for the CSA was $15,527.

== See also ==
- Arkansas statistical areas
