= Jonesboro metropolitan area =

Statistical Area

Jonesboro Area
- Metropolitan Statistical Area
- Jonesboro, AR Metropolitan Statistical Area
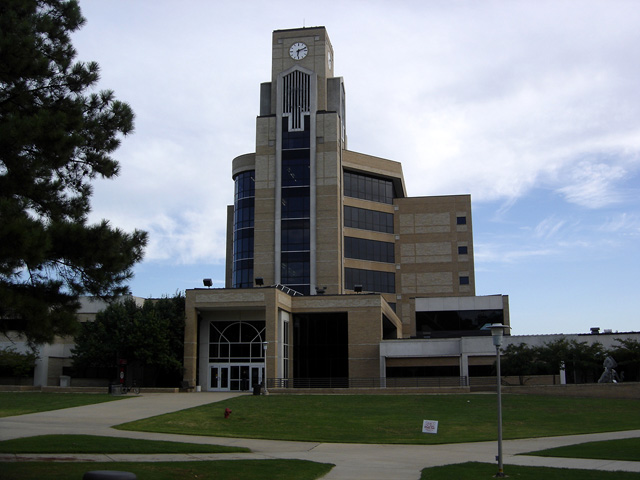
- Dean B. Ellis Library at Arkansas State University
Components of the Jonesboro–Paragould CSA
Jonesboro MSA
City of Jonesboro
Paragould μSA
City of Paragould
- Country: United States
- State: Arkansas
- Counties: Craighead; Poinsett
- Principal cities: Jonesboro
- Time zone: UTC-6 (CST)
  - Summer (DST): UTC-5 (CDT)

The Jonesboro Metropolitan Statistical Area, as defined by the United States Census Bureau, is an area consisting of two counties – Craighead and Poinsett – in northeast Arkansas, anchored by the city of Jonesboro. As of the 2020 census, the MSA had a population of 134,196 (a July 1, 2024 estimate has placed the population at 138,152). It is also part of the larger Jonesboro-Paragould Combined Statistical Area.

== Counties ==
- Craighead
- Poinsett

== Cities and towns ==
=== Places with more than 80,000 inhabitants ===
- Jonesboro (Principal city)

=== Places with 5,000 to 10,000 inhabitants ===
- Trumann
- Brookland

=== Places with 1,000 to 4,999 inhabitants ===
- Bay
- Bono
- Caraway
- Harrisburg
- Lake City
- Lepanto
- Marked Tree
- Monette

=== Places with less than 1,000 inhabitants ===
- Black Oak
- Cash
- Egypt
- Fisher
- Tyronza
- Waldenburg
- Weiner

=== Unincorporated places ===
- Bowman
- Greenfield
- Herman
- Lunsford
- Otwell
- Payneway
- Pitts
- Rivervale
- Stacy
- Whitehall

== Demographics ==
As of the census of 2000, there were 107,762 people, 42,327 households, and 29,321 families residing within the MSA. The racial makeup of the MSA was 89.68% White, 7.63% African American, 0.31% Native American, 0.50% Asian, 0.02% Pacific Islander, 0.88% from other races, and 0.98% from two or more races. Hispanic or Latino of any race were 1.95% of the population.

The median income for a household in the MSA was $29,492, and the median income for a family was $36,473. Males had a median income of $28,500 versus $20,154 for females. The per capita income for the MSA was $15,089.

== See also ==
- Arkansas statistical areas
- List of cities in Arkansas
- List of United States metropolitan areas
