= Interstate 555 =

Interstate Highway in Arkansas, United States

Interstate 555
- I-555 highlighted in red

Route information
- Auxiliary route of I-55
- Maintained by ArDOT
- Length: 49.57 mi (79.78 km)
- Existed: March 11, 2016–present
- NHS: Entire route

Major junctions
- South end: I-55 / US 61 / US 78 / AR 77 in Turrell
- AR 77 in Gilmore; AR 149 in Marked Tree; AR 75 in Marked Tree; AR 14 near Payneway; AR 463 at various locations; AR 69 in Trumann; US 78 / AR 18S in Jonesboro; US 49 / AR 1 in Jonesboro; US 49 / US 63 / US 78 / AR 18 in Jonesboro; AR 226 in Jonesboro
- North end: US 63 / AR 91 in Jonesboro

Location
- Country: United States
- State: Arkansas
- Counties: Crittenden, Poinsett, Craighead

Highway system
- Interstate Highway System; Main; Auxiliary; Suffixed; Business; Future; Arkansas Highway System; Interstate; US; State; Business; Spurs; Suffixed; Scenic; Heritage
← AR 549	→ AR 612

Interstate 555 (I-555) is an Interstate Highway connecting I-55 in Turrell with Highway 91 in Jonesboro. It provides a complete freeway corridor between Jonesboro, Arkansas' fifth-largest city, and Memphis, Tennessee. Formerly known as U.S. Route 63 (US 63), the highway was converted in the early 2000s to Interstate Highway standards. I-555 was dedicated in March 2016.

== Route description ==
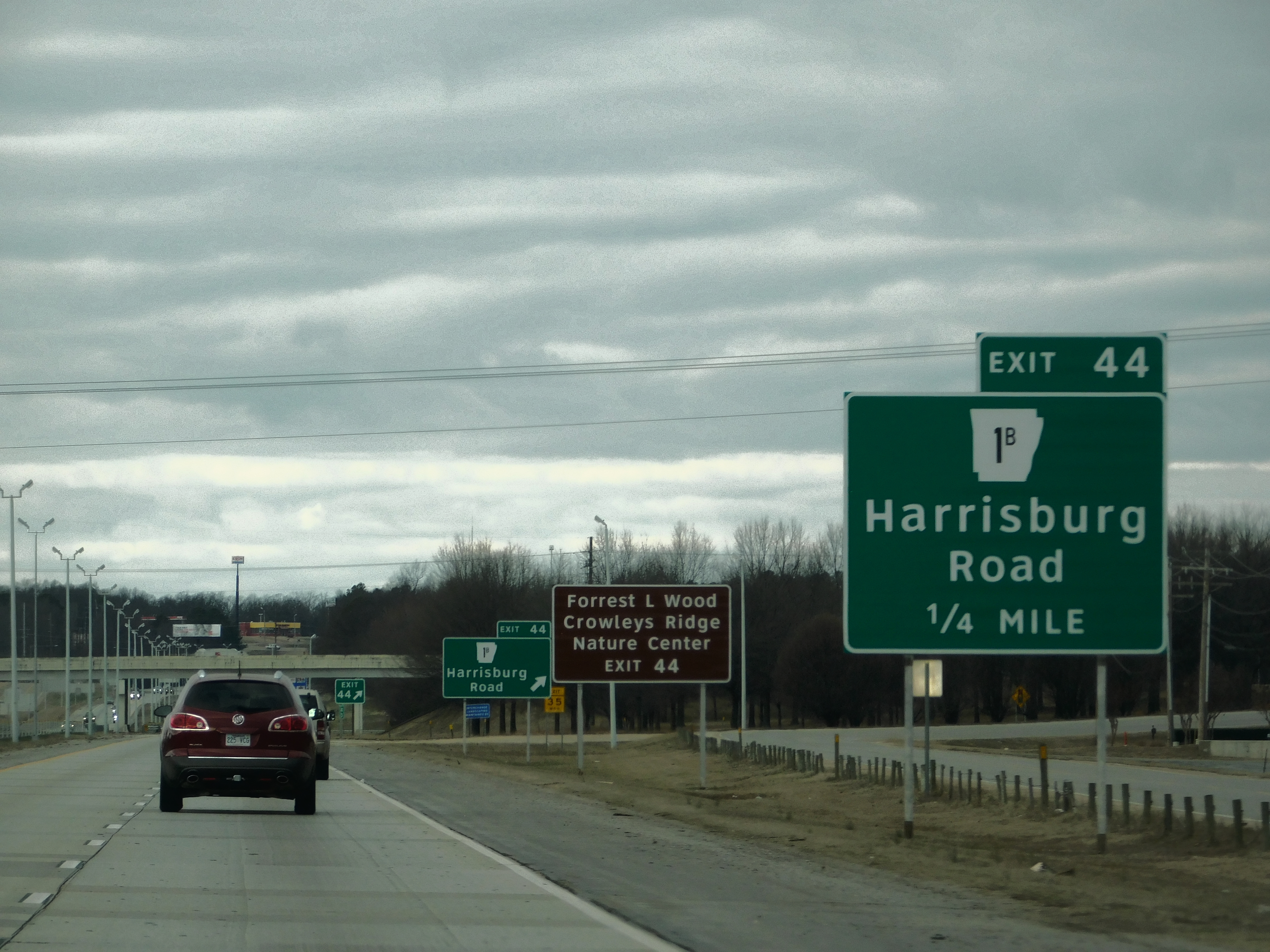
I-555 exit 44 signage

I-555 begins at an interchange of I-55, US 61, and AR 77 in Turrell. I-55 goes south to Memphis, Tennessee. The road parallel to the Interstate, AR 463, is a former alignment of US 63. I-555 passes through farmland and Gilmore. Then, it passes through Tyronza and Marked Tree. The section between Marked Tree and Payneway is also used for farm equipment vehicles to drive on. Next, it passes through Trumann before entering Jonesboro. It briefly has an overlap with US 49. I-555 ends in Jonesboro at an interchange with AR 91; from there, the road continues as US 63.

== History ==
The I-555 route was approved on January 10, 2001, consisting of a widened section of US 63 between Turrell to Jonesboro to Interstate Highway standards. A few mainline bridges between Marked Tree and Turrell are from original two-lane US 63 and are narrower than current standards, but I-530 was approved in 1999 despite having a similar issue.

The last requirement to formally designate this route as I-555 was the construction of a parallel access road across a floodway between Payneway and Marked Tree, so that farm equipment would no longer have to use US 63 to cross the floodway. No crossing has ever been built, but an exemption for agricultural vehicles was added to I-555 between Marked Tree and Payneway. The exemption was introduced by U.S. Representative Rick Crawford and passed as part of the House Transportation Bill on December 4, 2015. It was announced in December 2015 that I-555 would be officially designated in early 2016. In early 2016, signs along the section of the highway cautioned travelers that there may be farm equipment driving on the roadway. The road was officially dedicated on March 11, 2016, in Jonesboro. In 2021, US 63 was rerouted off the entire route of I-555, but a short extension on November 23 of that same year redesignated US 63 along a section of I-555 again.

== Future ==
ARDOT is currently running studies that will determine whether improvements to interchanges and cross-streets are needed for I-555 in Craighead County. Public meetings about the study were held in December 2021 and October 2023. Comments about the study were also requested between October and December 2023.

== Exit list ==
County	Location	mi	km	Exit	Destinations	Notes
Crittenden	Turrell	0.0	0.0		AR 77 south (US 61 north) – Turrell	Continuation south; southern end of AR 77 concurrency
Crittenden	Turrell	0.0	0.0	1	I-55 south / US 61 / US 78 – Blytheville, West Memphis	No northbound access to I-55 south; signed as exits 1B (north) and 1A (south); exit no. not signed northbound; exit 23A on I-55
Crittenden	Gilmore	1.9	3.1	2	AR 77 north – Gilmore	Northern end of AR 77 concurrency; access to Gilmore via Menesha Street
Poinsett		7.1	11.4	7	AR 135 – Lepanto	
Poinsett	Tyronza	8.7	14.0	8	AR 118 – Tyronza	
Poinsett	Marked Tree	13.2	21.2	13	AR 149 – Marked Tree, Earle	
Poinsett	Marked Tree	14.2	22.9	14	AR 75 – Marked Tree, Lepanto, Parkin	
Poinsett		18.2	29.3	18	AR 14 west – Payneway, Harrisburg	Eastern terminus of AR 14
Poinsett		24.0	38.6	24	AR 463 – Trumann	Former US 63
Poinsett	Trumann	28.7	46.2	29	AR 69 – Trumann	
Craighead	Bay	34.6	55.7	35	AR 463 (AR 158) – Bay	Former US 63
Craighead	Jonesboro	36.2	58.3	36	Nestlé Road	
Craighead	Jonesboro	39.1	62.9	39	US 78 east / AR 18S east (Dr. Martin Luther King Drive)	Southern end of US 78 concurrency; western terminus of AR 18S
Craighead	Jonesboro	40.3	64.9	40	AR 463 south (Nettleton Avenue)	Northern terminus of AR 463; former US 63
Craighead	Jonesboro	41.7	67.1	42	US 49 north / AR 1 (Stadium Boulevard / Red Wolf Boulevard) / Caraway Road – Paragould	Southern end of US 49 concurrency; former AR 173
Craighead	Jonesboro	43.4	69.8	44	AR 1B (Harrisburg Road)	
Craighead	Jonesboro	44.8	72.1	45	US 49 south / US 63 south / US 78 west / AR 18 east (Southwest Drive)	Northern end of US 49/US 78 concurrency; southern end of US 63/AR 18 concurrency
Craighead	Jonesboro	45.8	73.7	46	AR 226 west (Wood Springs Road) / Strawfloor Road	Eastern terminus of AR 226
Craighead	Jonesboro	47.1	75.8	47	Washington Avenue	
Craighead	Jonesboro	49.57	79.78	49	AR 91 (AR 18 west / Dan Avenue)	Northern end of AR 18 concurrency
Craighead	Jonesboro	49.57	79.78		US 63 north	Continuation north; northern end of US 63 concurrency
1.000 mi = 1.609 km; 1.000 km = 0.621 mi: Concurrency terminus
