= Senator Craighead =

Senator Craighead may refer to:

- Joni Craighead (born 1954), Nebraska State Senate
- Thomas Craighead (politician) (1798–1862), Arkansas State Senate
