= Arkansas Highway 63 =

Arkansas Highway 63 may refer to:

- U.S. Route 63 in Arkansas, a U.S. Highway that runs from Junction City to Mammoth Spring in the state of Arkansas
- Arkansas Highway 463, formerly known as U.S. Route 63
