= Craighead County, Arkansas =

County in Arkansas, United States

- County
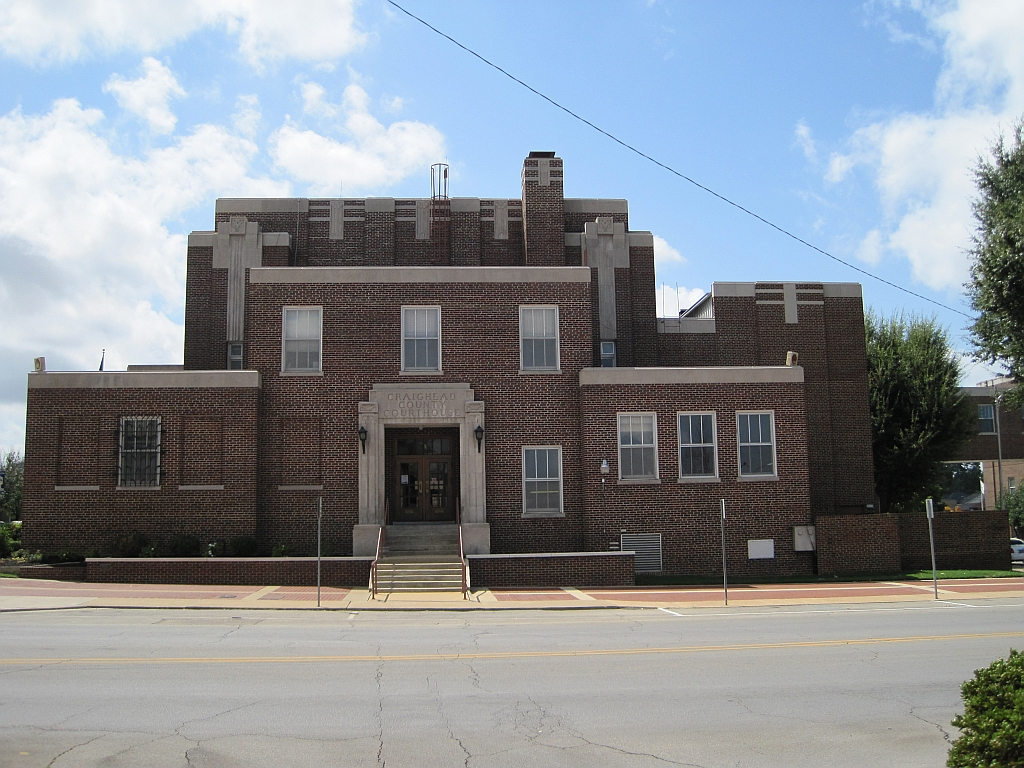
- Craighead County Courthouse, Jonesboro

- Flag Seal

- Location within the U.S. state of Arkansas
- Coordinates: 35°50′25″N 90°42′27″W
- Country: United States
- State: Arkansas
- Founded: February 19, 1859
- Named for: Thomas Craighead
- Seat: Jonesboro (western district); Lake City (eastern district)
- Largest city: Jonesboro

Area
  - Total: 713 sq mi (1,850 km^{2})
  - Land: 707 sq mi (1,830 km^{2})
  - Water: 5.5 sq mi (14 km^{2}) 0.8%

Population (2020)
  - Total: 111,231
  - Estimate (2025): 116,957 ▲
  - Density: 157/sq mi (60.7/km^{2})
- Time zone: UTC−6 (Central)
  - Summer (DST): UTC−5 (CDT)
- Congressional district: 1st
- Website: craigheadcountyar.gov

Craighead County is a county located in the U.S. state of Arkansas. As of the 2020 census, the population was 111,231. The county has two county seats — Jonesboro and Lake City. Craighead County is Arkansas's 58th county, formed on February 19, 1859, and named for state Senator Thomas Craighead. It is one of several dry counties within the state of Arkansas, in which the sale of alcoholic beverages is largely prohibited.

Craighead County is included in Jonesboro–Paragould Combined Statistical Area.

== History ==
Craighead County was part of the territory claimed for France on April 9, 1682, by René Robert Cavelier, Sieur de La Salle, who laid claim to all of the land drained by the Mississippi River and its tributaries. LaSalle's claim was named Louisiana in honor of Louis XIV, King of France.

The Treaty of Fontainebleau (1762) was signed between France and Spain and ownership of the Louisiana territory west of the Mississippi River was transferred to the Spanish crown as a result of the Seven Years' War and Craighead County became a Spanish possession.

Spain controlled the territory encompassing the county until October 1, 1800, when Napoleon Bonaparte forced Spain to return the lost territories to France under the Third Treaty of San Ildefonso. Napoleon maintained grandiose plans to establish a vast French Empire in Louisiana but the Royal Navy prevented him from transferring troops or settlers to the acquired territories.

Fear was high in the United States that Napoleon would attempt to close the Mississippi River to American trade. President Thomas Jefferson inquired about purchasing an area near the mouth of the river to ensure that it would stay open to American goods. Napoleon, needing money, offered to sell the United States the entire territory of Louisiana for $23,213,568.

The treaty was finalized in 1803 and the land that would become Craighead County became the possession of the United States.

Craighead County remained in the Louisiana Territory until the State of Louisiana was admitted to the Union. At that time the territory that includes modern day Arkansas was attached to the Missouri Territory.

In 1813, the area was included in a new political subdivision known as Arkansas County which was a political subdivision of the Arkansas District of the Territory of Missouri. In 1815 the county was further subdivided and Lawrence County was formed with its seat at Davidsonville. This new county included most of what is now northern Arkansas. The modern Craighead County lay partially within Arkansas County and partially within Lawrence County.

Residents of the Missouri Territory soon began petitioning Congress for admission to the Union. Their request did not include the District of Arkansas and Arkansas residents petitioned for separate territorial status for their district. In 1819 the Arkansas Territory was formed.

In 1838, Poinsett County was formed and included most of present-day Craighead County. This situation persisted until 1850 when residents of the area complained about the distance to the Poinsett County seat.

In 1858, State Senator William A. Jones campaign platform included a promise to seek the formation of a new county for the area. His election was successful and helped push legislation for the formation of the new county.

The new county was to be formed from lands taken from Greene, Mississippi, and Poinsett counties, and it was to be named "Crowley County" in honor of Crowley's Ridge which runs through the center of the county.

Senator Thomas Craighead represented Mississippi County, and opposed the bill because the farmland it took from Mississippi County (commonly known as the Buffalo Island area) was a major source of property taxes for the county.

One day while Senator Craighead was away from the floor, Senator Jones amended the bill to change the county's name to "Craighead County". The Senate, thinking it was a compromise, approved the bill as amended; by the time Senator Craighead returned, the bill had already left the Senate, and he took no further action.

Craighead County was officially formed February 19, 1859; in gratitude, the citizens then named the main county seat Jonesboro, for Senator Jones. (Some sources say the name was actually proposed by Senator Craighead in a resolution.) Lake City, just across the St. Francis River from the Buffalo Island area, was added as a second county seat in 1883.

In the early 20th century, Clay, Greene, and Craighead counties had sundown town policies forbidding African Americans from living in the area.

== Geography ==
According to the U.S. Census Bureau, the county has a total area of 713 square miles (1,850 km^{2}), of which 707 square miles (1,830 km^{2}) is land and 5.5 square miles (14 km^{2}) (0.8%) is water. Crowley's Ridge is the county's most prominent geological feature.

=== Major highways ===
- I-57 / US 67
- I-555
- US 49
  - US 49B (Brookland)
- US 63
  - US 63B (Bono)
- US 78
- AR 1
  - AR 1B (Jonesboro)
- AR 18
  - AR 18S (Jonesboro)
- AR 69
- AR 91
- AR 135
- AR 139
- AR 141
- AR 148
- AR 158
- AR 163
- AR 226
- AR 230
- AR 349
- AR 351
- AR 463

=== Airport ===
The region is served by the Jonesboro Municipal Airport.

=== Adjacent counties ===
- Greene County (north)
- Dunklin County, Missouri (northeast)
- Mississippi County (east)
- Poinsett County (south)
- Jackson County (west)
- Lawrence County (northwest)

== Demographics ==
Historical population
Census	Pop.	Note	%±
1860	3,066		—
1870	4,577		49.3%
1880	7,037		53.7%
1890	12,025		70.9%
1900	19,505		62.2%
1910	27,627		41.6%
1920	37,541		35.9%
1930	44,740		19.2%
1940	47,200		5.5%
1950	50,613		7.2%
1960	47,303		−6.5%
1970	52,068		10.1%
1980	63,239		21.5%
1990	68,956		9.0%
2000	82,148		19.1%
2010	96,443		17.4%
2020	111,231		15.3%
2025 (est.)	116,957	▲	5.1%
U.S. Decennial Census; 1790–1960 1900–1990; 1990–2000 2010–2016 2020 census

=== 2020 census ===
As of the 2020 census, the county had a population of 111,231. The median age was 33.5 years. 24.8% of residents were under the age of 18 and 14.0% of residents were 65 years of age or older. For every 100 females there were 93.8 males, and for every 100 females age 18 and over there were 90.3 males age 18 and over.

The racial makeup of the county was 72.5% White, 16.6% Black or African American, 0.3% American Indian and Alaska Native, 1.5% Asian, 0.1% Native Hawaiian and Pacific Islander, 3.1% from some other race, and 5.9% from two or more races. Hispanic or Latino residents of any race comprised 6.0% of the population.

66.3% of residents lived in urban areas, while 33.7% lived in rural areas.

There were 43,221 households in the county, of which 33.3% had children under the age of 18 living in them. Of all households, 44.2% were married-couple households, 18.8% were households with a male householder and no spouse or partner present, and 29.9% were households with a female householder and no spouse or partner present. About 28.2% of all households were made up of individuals and 9.9% had someone living alone who was 65 years of age or older.

There were 46,739 housing units, of which 7.5% were vacant. Among occupied housing units, 55.8% were owner-occupied and 44.2% were renter-occupied. The homeowner vacancy rate was 1.8% and the rental vacancy rate was 7.6%.

=== 2000 census ===
As of the 2000 United States census, there were 82,148 people, 32,301 households, and 22,093 families residing in the county. The population density was 116 inhabitants per square mile (45/km^{2}). There were 35,133 housing units at an average density of 49 per square mile (19/km^{2}). The racial makeup of the county was 89.27% White, 7.78% Black or African American, 0.33% Native American, 0.60% Asian, 0.02% Pacific Islander, 0.93% from other races, and 1.06% from two or more races. 2.12% of the population were Hispanic or Latino of any race.

There were 32,301 households, out of which 32.30% had children under the age of 18 living with them, 53.30% were married couples living together, 11.40% had a female householder with no husband present, and 31.60% were non-families. 25.20% of all households were made up of individuals, and 9.10% had someone living alone who was 65 years of age or older. The average household size was 2.46 and the average family size was 2.96.

In the county, the population was spread out, with 24.10% under the age of 18, 14.00% from 18 to 24, 28.70% from 25 to 44, 21.40% from 45 to 64, and 11.80% who were 65 years of age or older. The median age was 33 years. For every 100 females, there were 93.80 males. For every 100 females age 18 and over, there were 90.50 males.

The median income for a household in the county was $32,425, and the median income for a family was $40,688. Males had a median income of $30,366 versus $21,109 for females. The per capita income for the county was $17,091. About 11.60% of families and 15.40% of the population were below the poverty line, including 19.40% of those under age 18 and 13.40% of those age 65 or over.

== Government ==
The county government is a constitutional body granted specific powers by the Constitution of Arkansas and the Arkansas Code. The quorum court is the legislative branch of the county government and controls all spending and revenue collection. Representatives are called justices of the peace and are elected from county districts every even-numbered year. The number of districts in a county vary from nine to fifteen, and district boundaries are drawn by the county election commission. The Craighead County Quorum Court has thirteen members. Presiding over quorum court meetings is the county judge, who serves as the chief executive officer of the county. The county judge is elected at-large and does not vote in quorum court business, although capable of vetoing quorum court decisions.

Craighead County, Arkansas Elected countywide officials
Position	Officeholder	Party
County Judge	Marvin Day	Republican
County Clerk	Mary Dawn Marshall	Republican
Circuit Clerk	David Vaughn	Republican
Sheriff	Marty Boyd	Republican
Treasurer	Terry McNatt	Republican
Collector	Wes Eddington	Republican
Assessor	Hannah Towell	Republican
Coroner	Toby Emerson	Republican

In addition to the countywide offices, the Eastern District of Craighead County elects a deputy clerk and deputy sheriff. The eastern district officials as of the 2024 elections are:

- Deputy Clerk: Lesia Couch (R)
- Deputy Sheriff: Chris Kelems (R)

The composition of the Quorum Court after the 2024 elections is 12 Republicans and 1 Democrat. Justices of the Peace (members) of the Quorum Court following the elections are:

- District 1: Brad Noel (R) of Jonesboro
- District 2: Garrett Barnes (D) of Jonesboro
- District 3: Barry Forrest (R) of Jonesboro
- District 4: Linda Allison (R) of Jonesboro
- District 5: Rick Myers (R) of Jonesboro
- District 6: Darrell Cook (R) of Jonesboro
- District 7: Richard Rogers (R) of Jonesboro
- District 8: David Tennison (R) of Jonesboro
- District 9: Josh Longmire (R) of Jonesboro
- District 10: Steve Cline (R) of Bono
- District 11: Dan Pasmore (R) of Jonesboro
- District 12: Terry Couch (R) of Caraway
- District 13: Kevin D. Williams (R) of Jonesboro

Additionally, the townships of Craighead County are entitled to elect their own respective constables, as set forth by the Constitution of Arkansas. Constables are largely of historical significance as they were used to keep the peace in rural areas when travel was more difficult. The township constables as of the 2024 elections are:

- District 2: Roger Watkins (R)
- District 3: Michael Hames (Independent)
- District 7: Danny Williford (R)
- District 9: Scott A. Davis (R)
- District 10: Jerry Allison (R)
- District 11: Chris W. Ayers (R)
- District 13: Dan Walker (R)

Craighead County has voted Republican in the majority of presidential elections since 1960; prior to that it was solidly Democratic.

United States presidential election results for Craighead County, Arkansas
Year	Republican		Democratic		Third party(ies)	
Year	No.	%	No.	%	No.	%
1892	372	20.85%	1,248	69.96%	164	9.19%
1896	329	14.79%	1,890	84.98%	5	0.22%
1900	489	26.07%	1,326	70.68%	61	3.25%
1904	559	32.48%	1,051	61.07%	111	6.45%
1908	711	27.73%	1,653	64.47%	200	7.80%
1912	269	13.10%	1,259	61.30%	526	25.61%
1916	543	21.72%	1,957	78.28%	0	0.00%
1920	1,058	32.64%	2,079	64.15%	104	3.21%
1924	812	29.06%	1,711	61.24%	271	9.70%
1928	1,958	47.55%	2,132	51.77%	28	0.68%
1932	606	11.96%	4,412	87.09%	48	0.95%
1936	710	17.46%	3,335	82.02%	21	0.52%
1940	935	21.94%	3,300	77.43%	27	0.63%
1944	1,474	29.05%	3,582	70.60%	18	0.35%
1948	759	14.85%	3,238	63.37%	1,113	21.78%
1952	4,199	41.16%	5,975	58.57%	28	0.27%
1956	4,035	40.11%	5,876	58.41%	149	1.48%
1960	5,258	48.97%	4,898	45.61%	582	5.42%
1964	5,163	38.13%	8,334	61.55%	44	0.32%
1968	5,047	32.50%	3,738	24.07%	6,742	43.42%
1972	11,312	65.94%	5,843	34.06%	0	0.00%
1976	6,213	30.98%	13,840	69.02%	0	0.00%
1980	11,010	51.31%	9,231	43.02%	1,215	5.66%
1984	14,047	62.87%	8,035	35.96%	261	1.17%
1988	11,887	54.99%	9,083	42.02%	645	2.98%
1992	9,104	35.57%	13,931	54.43%	2,561	10.01%
1996	9,210	37.47%	13,284	54.04%	2,088	8.49%
2000	12,158	48.33%	12,376	49.20%	623	2.48%
2004	15,818	53.08%	13,665	45.85%	318	1.07%
2008	18,881	60.97%	11,294	36.47%	793	2.56%
2012	20,350	64.20%	10,527	33.21%	823	2.60%
2016	22,892	64.35%	10,538	29.62%	2,143	6.02%
2020	25,558	66.37%	11,921	30.95%	1,032	2.68%
2024	25,152	67.54%	11,210	30.10%	880	2.36%

== Education ==
=== Public schools ===
Craighead County consists of eight public school districts with numerous secondary and elementary schools including:

- Bay School District, including Bay High School (Bay)
- Brookland School District, including Brookland High School (Brookland)
- Buffalo Island Central School District, including Buffalo Island Central High School (Monette)
- Greene County Tech School District (its high school, Greene County Tech High School, is in another county)
- Jonesboro School District, including Jonesboro High School (Jonesboro)
- Nettleton School District, including Nettleton High School (Jonesboro)
- Riverside School District, including Riverside High School (Lake City)
- Valley View School District, including Valley View High School (Jonesboro)
- Westside Consolidated School District, including Westside High School (near Jonesboro)

=== Private schools ===
- Ridgefield Christian School (Jonesboro) PK-12
- Blessed Sacrament School (Jonesboro) KG-6
- Concordia Christian Academy (Jonesboro) PK-6
- First Presbyterian Preschool & Kindergarten (Jonesboro) PK-KG
- Montessori School of Jonesboro (Jonesboro) PK-KG

=== Postsecondary education ===
- Arkansas State University
- Arkansas State University Newport - Jonesboro Technical Campus

== Communities ==
=== Cities ===
- Bay
- Bono
- Brookland
- Caraway
- Cash
- Jonesboro (county seat)
- Lake City (county seat)
- Monette

=== Towns ===
- Black Oak
- Egypt

=== Census-designated place ===
- Bowman

=== Other unincorporated communities ===
- Childress
- Gibson
- Goobertown
- Herman
- Lester
- Lunsford
- Otwell

=== Townships ===
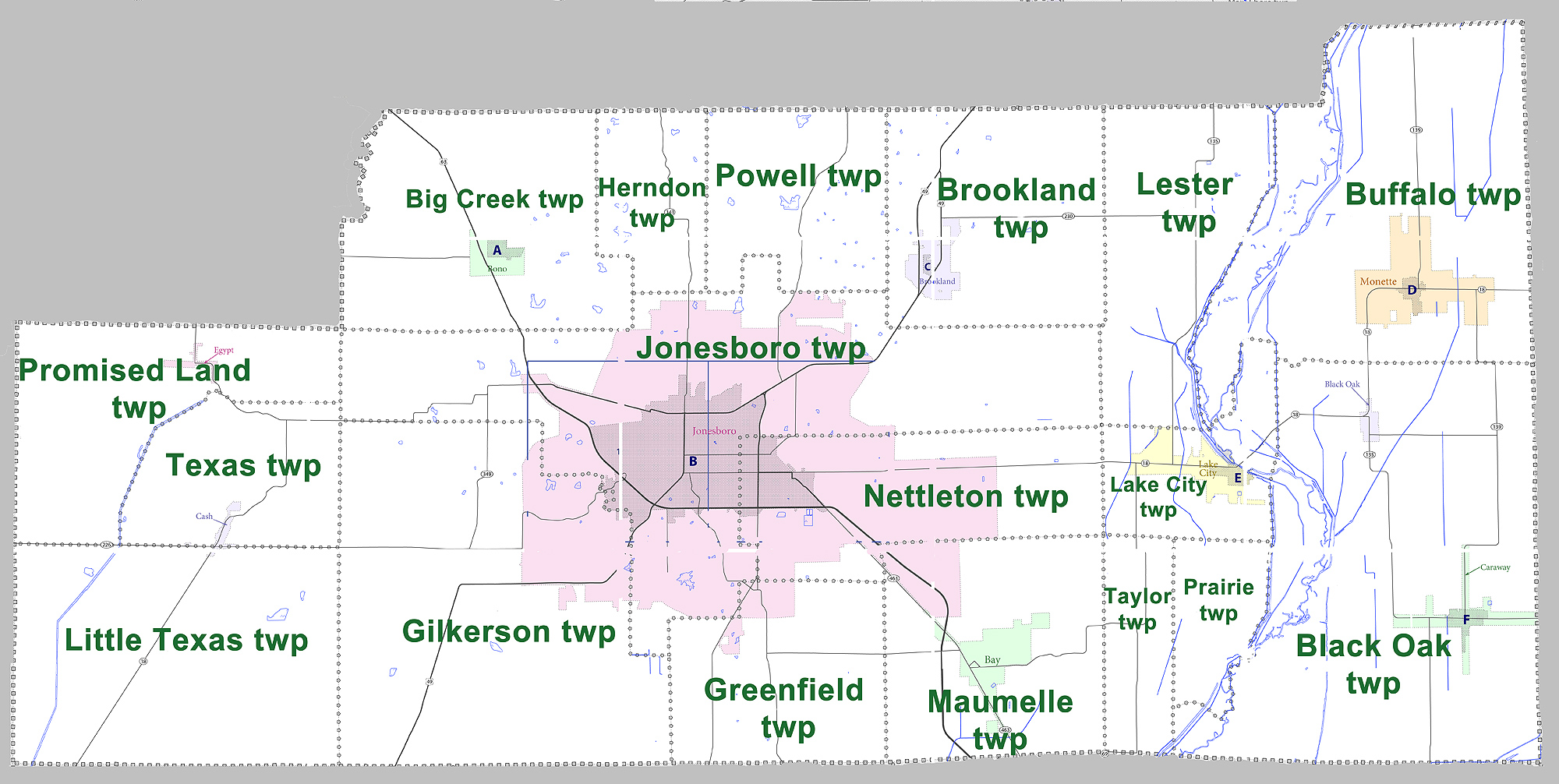
Townships in Craighead County, Arkansas as of 2010

Townships in Arkansas are the divisions of a county. Each township includes unincorporated areas; some may have incorporated cities or towns within part of their boundaries. Arkansas townships have limited purposes in modern times. However, the United States census does list Arkansas population based on townships (sometimes referred to as "county subdivisions" or "minor civil divisions"). Townships are also of value for historical purposes in terms of genealogical research. Each town or city is within one or more townships in an Arkansas county based on census maps and publications. The townships of Craighead County are listed below; listed in parentheses are the cities, towns, and/or census-designated places that are fully or partially inside the township.

- Big Creek (Bono)
- Black Oak (Black Oak) (Caraway)
- Brookland (Brookland)
- Buffalo (Monette)
- Gilkerson (part of Jonesboro)
- Greenfield (small part of Jonesboro)
- Herndon
- Jonesboro (largest portion of Jonesboro)
- Lake City (Lake City)
- Lester
- Little Texas (small part of Cash)
- Maumelle (Bay, part of Jonesboro)
- Nettleton (part of Jonesboro)
- Powell
- Prairie
- Promised Land (Egypt)
- Taylor
- Texas (majority of Cash)

== See also ==
- List of lakes in Craighead County, Arkansas
- National Register of Historic Places listings in Craighead County, Arkansas
- St. Francis River Bridge (Lake City, Arkansas)
- List of sundown towns in the United States
