= Thomas Craighead =

Thomas Craighead may refer to:

- Thomas Craighead (politician) (Thomas B. Craighead), American politician and lawyer from Arkansas
- Thomas B. Craighead (minister) (Thomas Brown Craighead), American Presbyterian minister and educator
