= Nettleton High School (Arkansas) =

High school in Jonesboro, Arkansas, United States

Location
- 4207 Race Street; Jonesboro, Craighead, Arkansas 72401; United States; 35°48′45″N 90°38′58″W

Information
- School type: Public, College Preparatory
- Motto: Whatever it takes for every child
- Established: c1896
- Status: Open
- School board: Nettleton School Board
- School district: Nettleton School District
- NCES District ID: 0510440
- Oversight: Arkansas Department of Education (ADE)
- Superintendent: Karen Curtner
- CEEB code: 041815
- NCES School ID: 051044000762
- Executive Principal: Reshad Sims
- Arts/Humanities Principal: Amy Floyd
- Career/Tech Principal: Phillip Cook
- STEM Principal: Barry Carlton
- Grades: 9-12
- Age range: 14-18
- Enrollment: 904 (2023-2024)
- Student to teacher ratio: 10.18
- Education system: ADE Smart Core curriculum
- Classes offered: Regular, Advanced Placement
- Hours in school day: 7
- Campus type: Urban
- Colors: Black, White and Vegas gold
- Song: Alma Mater (Annie Lisle)
- Athletics conference: 5A East
- Sports: Football, Basketball, Volleyball, Soccer
- Mascot: Raider
- Team name: Nettleton Raiders
- Rival: Valley View High School
- Accreditation: AdvancED (1965-)
- USNWR ranking: 183rd in Arkansas (USNWR)
- Newspaper: The Chieftan
- Feeder schools: Nettleton Junior High School (7-8)
- Affiliation: Arkansas Activities Association (AAA)
- Website: nhs.nettletonschools.net

Nettleton High School is a comprehensive four-year public high school located in Jonesboro, Arkansas, United States. It is one of eight public high schools in Craighead County, Arkansas, and the only high school managed by the Nettleton School District. It serves as the main feeder school for Nettleton Junior High School.

== Curriculum ==
The assumed course of study at Nettleton High School is the Smart Core curriculum developed by the Arkansas Department of Education. Students are engaged in regular and Advanced Placement (AP) coursework and exams prior to graduation, with the opportunity for qualified students to be named honor graduates based on grade point average and additional coursework above minimum requirements. The school administers vocational classes through Jonesboro High School (Arkansas). Nettleton High School has been accredited since 1965 by AdvancED.

== Extracurricular activities ==
=== Athletics ===
For 2012–2014, the Nettleton Raiders participate in the 5A East Conference administered by the Arkansas Activities Association (AAA). The Raiders compete in interscholastic competition including baseball, basketball (boys/girls), competitive cheer, competitive dance, cross country, football, golf (boys/girls), soccer (boys/girls), softball, swimming and diving (boys/girls), track and field (boys/girls) and volleyball.

- Volleyball: The Lady Raiders volleyball team are 3-time state volleyball champions (1987, 2010, 2012). In 2012, Nettleton defeated Little Rock Christian (18–25, 25–22, 25–19, 25–19) to win the 5A State Volleyball Championship.
- Spirit: The competitive dance team won the 5A classification's state dance championship in 2010, 2011, and 2012.
- Basketball: Led by Jerry Rook, the Raiders basketball team won a state basketball championship in 1961.
- Softball: The Lady Raiders softball team won a state (slowpitch) softball championship in 1997, followed by two state (fastpitch) softball championships in 2002 and 2008.
- Tennis: The boys tennis team are 2-time state tennis champions (1985, 2002).

=== Clubs and traditions ===
The Nettleton High School mascot is the Raider and the school colors are black, white and Vegas gold.

The Nettleton Quiz Bowl team placed 2nd at the 2017 AGQBA State Tournament

== Notable alumni ==
- Jerry Rook (1961) – professional basketball player
- James W. Pardew (1962) – United States Ambassador to Bulgaria
- Angie Craig – (1990) Congresswoman for the United States House of Representatives
- Corey Ragsdale (2001) – professional baseball coach
