= Arkansas statistical areas =

Coordinates: 34.8938°N 92.4426°W

The U.S. State of Arkansas currently has 25 statistical areas that have been delineated by the Office of Management and Budget (OMB). On July 21, 2023, the OMB delineated four combined statistical areas, seven metropolitan statistical areas, and 14 micropolitan statistical areas in Arkansas. As of 2023, the most populous statistical area in the state is Little Rock-North Little Rock, AR CSA, comprising the metro area of its capital and largest city, Little Rock.

== Statistical areas ==
The Office of Management and Budget (OMB) has designated more than 1,000 statistical areas for the United States and Puerto Rico. These statistical areas are important geographic delineations of population clusters used by the OMB, the United States Census Bureau, planning organizations, and federal, state, and local government entities.

The OMB defines a core-based statistical area (commonly referred to as a CBSA) as the county or counties (or county-equivalents) surrounding at least one densely-settled core of at least 10,000 population, "plus adjacent counties having a high degree of social and economic integration with the core as measured through commuting ties with the counties containing the core". The OMB further divides core-based statistical areas based on population into metropolitan statistical areas (MSAs) for those with at least 50,000 and micropolitan statistical areas (μSAs) for those with 10,000 to 49,999 people.

The OMB defines a combined statistical area (CSA) as two or more adjacent core-based statistical areas where the employment interchange rate (% commuting from A to B plus % commuting from B to A) is at least 15%. The primary statistical areas (PSAs) include all combined statistical areas and any core-based statistical area that is not a constituent of a combined statistical area.

The 25 United States statistical areas and 75 counties of the State of Arkansas (Note: An out-of-state area and its population are displayed in green. An area that extends into more than one state is displayed in purple. A purple population number over a black population number show the total population versus the in-state population. The state's abbreviation is also shown next to the in-state total.)
Combined statistical area	2025 population (est.)	Core-based statistical area	2025 population (est.)	County	2025 population (est.)
Little Rock-North Little Rock, AR CSA	927,903	Little Rock-North Little Rock-Conway, AR MSA	777,607	Pulaski County, Arkansas	404,611
Little Rock-North Little Rock, AR CSA	927,903	Little Rock-North Little Rock-Conway, AR MSA	777,607	Faulkner County, Arkansas	133,979
Little Rock-North Little Rock, AR CSA	927,903	Little Rock-North Little Rock-Conway, AR MSA	777,607	Saline County, Arkansas	133,288
Little Rock-North Little Rock, AR CSA	927,903	Little Rock-North Little Rock-Conway, AR MSA	777,607	Lonoke County, Arkansas	76,664
Little Rock-North Little Rock, AR CSA	927,903	Little Rock-North Little Rock-Conway, AR MSA	777,607	Grant County, Arkansas	18,756
Little Rock-North Little Rock, AR CSA	927,903	Little Rock-North Little Rock-Conway, AR MSA	777,607	Perry County, Arkansas	10,309
Little Rock-North Little Rock, AR CSA	927,903	Searcy, AR μSA	80,085	White County, Arkansas	80,085
Little Rock-North Little Rock, AR CSA	927,903	Pine Bluff, AR μSA	70,211	Jefferson County, Arkansas	62,987
Little Rock-North Little Rock, AR CSA	927,903	Pine Bluff, AR μSA	70,211	Cleveland County, Arkansas	7,224
none		Fayetteville-Springdale-Rogers, AR MSA	622,177	Benton County, Arkansas	332,554
none		Fayetteville-Springdale-Rogers, AR MSA	622,177	Washington County, Arkansas	271,213
none		Fayetteville-Springdale-Rogers, AR MSA	622,177	Madison County, Arkansas	18,410
none		Fort Smith, AR-OK MSA	234,140; 193,298 (AR)	Sebastian County, Arkansas	130,641
none		Fort Smith, AR-OK MSA	234,140; 193,298 (AR)	Crawford County, Arkansas	62,657
none		Fort Smith, AR-OK MSA	234,140; 193,298 (AR)	Sequoyah County, Oklahoma	40,842
Jonesboro-Paragould, AR CSA	186,851	Jonesboro, AR MSA	139,440	Craighead County, Arkansas	116,957
Jonesboro-Paragould, AR CSA	186,851	Jonesboro, AR MSA	139,440	Poinsett County, Arkansas	22,483
Jonesboro-Paragould, AR CSA	186,851	Paragould, AR μSA	47,411	Greene County, Arkansas	47,411
Hot Springs-Malvern, AR CSA	133,146	Hot Springs, AR MSA	99,695	Garland County, Arkansas	99,784
Hot Springs-Malvern, AR CSA	133,146	Malvern, AR μSA	33,451	Hot Spring County, Arkansas	33,451
none		Russellville, AR μSA	84,932	Pope County, Arkansas	64,976
none		Russellville, AR μSA	84,932	Yell County, Arkansas	19,956
Memphis-Forrest City, TN-MS-AR CSA	1,383,061; 68,010 (AR)	Memphis, TN-MS-AR MSA	1,341,412; 46,210 (AR)	Shelby County, Tennessee	910,226
Memphis-Forrest City, TN-MS-AR CSA	1,383,061; 68,010 (AR)	Memphis, TN-MS-AR MSA	1,341,412; 46,210 (AR)	DeSoto County, Mississippi	197,918
Memphis-Forrest City, TN-MS-AR CSA	1,383,061; 68,010 (AR)	Memphis, TN-MS-AR MSA	1,341,412; 46,210 (AR)	Tipton County, Tennessee	62,287
Memphis-Forrest City, TN-MS-AR CSA	1,383,061; 68,010 (AR)	Memphis, TN-MS-AR MSA	1,341,412; 46,210 (AR)	Crittenden County, Arkansas	46,210
Memphis-Forrest City, TN-MS-AR CSA	1,383,061; 68,010 (AR)	Memphis, TN-MS-AR MSA	1,341,412; 46,210 (AR)	Fayette County, Tennessee	45,071
Memphis-Forrest City, TN-MS-AR CSA	1,383,061; 68,010 (AR)	Memphis, TN-MS-AR MSA	1,341,412; 46,210 (AR)	Marshall County, Mississippi	34,654
Memphis-Forrest City, TN-MS-AR CSA	1,383,061; 68,010 (AR)	Memphis, TN-MS-AR MSA	1,341,412; 46,210 (AR)	Tate County, Mississippi	28,725
Memphis-Forrest City, TN-MS-AR CSA	1,383,061; 68,010 (AR)	Memphis, TN-MS-AR MSA	1,341,412; 46,210 (AR)	Tunica County, Mississippi	8,819
Memphis-Forrest City, TN-MS-AR CSA	1,383,061; 68,010 (AR)	Memphis, TN-MS-AR MSA	1,341,412; 46,210 (AR)	Benton County, Mississippi	7,502
Memphis-Forrest City, TN-MS-AR CSA	1,383,061; 68,010 (AR)	Forrest City, AR μSA	21,800	St. Francis County, Arkansas	21,800
Memphis-Forrest City, TN-MS-AR CSA	1,383,061; 68,010 (AR)	Clarksdale, MS μSA	19,849	Coahoma County, Mississippi	19,849
none		Texarkana, TX-AR MSA	146,816; 54,120 (AR)	Bowie County, Texas	92,696
none		Texarkana, TX-AR MSA	146,816; 54,120 (AR)	Miller County, Arkansas	42,357
none		Texarkana, TX-AR MSA	146,816; 54,120 (AR)	Little River County, Arkansas	11,763
none		Harrison, AR μSA	45,654	Boone County, Arkansas	38,628
none		Harrison, AR μSA	45,654	Newton County, Arkansas	7,026
none		Mountain Home, AR μSA	42,982	Baxter County, Arkansas	42,982
none		Blytheville, AR μSA	37,828	Mississippi County, Arkansas	37,828
none		Batesville, AR μSA	38,785	Independence County, Arkansas	38,785
none		El Dorado, AR μSA	36,926	Union County, Arkansas	36,926
none		Camden, AR μSA	26,363	Ouachita County, Arkansas	21,731
none		Camden, AR μSA	26,363	Calhoun County, Arkansas	4,632
none		Magnolia, AR μSA	21,894	Columbia County, Arkansas	21,894
none		Arkadelphia, AR μSA	20,938	Clark County, Arkansas	20,938
none		none		Carroll County, Arkansas	29,263
none		none		Johnson County, Arkansas	26,225
none		none		Cleburne County, Arkansas	25,672
none		none		Logan County, Arkansas	21,633
none		none		Conway County, Arkansas	21,393
none		none		Polk County, Arkansas	19,486
none		none		Hempstead County, Arkansas	19,080
none		none		Randolph County, Arkansas	18,876
none		none		Ashley County, Arkansas	17,831
none		none		Sharp County, Arkansas	18,122
none		none		Marion County, Arkansas	17,593
none		none		Franklin County, Arkansas	17,725
none		none		Drew County, Arkansas	17,054
none		none		Jackson County, Arkansas	16,741
none		none		Cross County, Arkansas	16,186
none		none		Lawrence County, Arkansas	16,273
none		none		Arkansas County, Arkansas	15,836
none		none		Van Buren County, Arkansas	16,238
none		none		Sevier County, Arkansas	15,758
none		none		Phillips County, Arkansas	14,255
none		none		Clay County, Arkansas	14,052
none		none		Izard County, Arkansas	14,405
none		none		Lincoln County, Arkansas	12,764
none		none		Stone County, Arkansas	12,703
none		none		Howard County, Arkansas	12,306
none		none		Fulton County, Arkansas	12,492
none		none		Desha County, Arkansas	9,984
none		none		Pike County, Arkansas	9,964
none		none		Bradley County, Arkansas	9,828
none		none		Scott County, Arkansas	9,965
none		none		Chicot County, Arkansas	9,107
none		none		Montgomery County, Arkansas	8,579
none		none		Lee County, Arkansas	8,029
none		none		Nevada County, Arkansas	7,942
none		none		Prairie County, Arkansas	7,923
none		none		Searcy County, Arkansas	7,848
none		none		Monroe County, Arkansas	6,244
none		none		Dallas County, Arkansas	6,011
none		none		Lafayette County, Arkansas	5,888
none		none		Woodruff County, Arkansas	5,710
State of Arkansas					3,114,791

The 21 core-based statistical areas of the State of Arkansas (Note: For CBSAs comprising populations from multiple states, they are listed twice to show both their intrastate population within that CBSA as well as the CBSA's total population. Only the intrastate population is ranked.)
2025 rank	Core-based statistical area	Population				
2025 rank	Core-based statistical area	2025 estimate	Change	2020 Census	Change	2010 Census
1	Little Rock-North Little Rock-Conway, AR MSA	777,607	+3.95%	748,031	+6.90%	699,757
2	Fayetteville-Springdale-Rogers, AR MSA	622,177	+13.80%	546,725	+24.22%	440,121
3	Fort Smith, AR-OK MSA (AR)	193,298	+2.86%	187,932	+0.13%	187,692
4	Jonesboro, AR MSA	139,440	+3.91%	134,196	+10.88%	121,026
5	Hot Springs, AR MSA	99,695	−0.48%	100,180	+4.33%	96,024
6	Russellville, AR μSA	84,932	+1.54%	83,644	−0.35%	83,939
7	Searcy, AR μSA	80,085	+4.25%	76,822	−0.33%	77,076
8	Pine Bluff, AR μSA	70,211	−6.15%	74,810	−13.14%	86,124
9	Texarkana, TX-AR MSA (AR)	54,120	−0.93%	54,626	−3.54%	56,633
10	Memphis, TN-MS-AR MSA (AR)	46,210	−4.05%	48,163	−5.38%	50,902
11	Paragould, AR μSA	47,411	+3.66%	45,736	+8.66%	42,090
12	Harrison, AR μSA	45,654	+2.37%	44,598	−1.40%	45,233
13	Mountain Home, AR μSA	42,982	+3.26%	41,627	+0.27%	41,513
14	Blytheville, AR μSA	37,828	−7.02%	40,685	−12.47%	46,480
15	Batesville, AR μSA	38,785	+2.23%	37,938	+3.52%	36,647
16	El Dorado, AR μSA	36,926	−5.45%	39,054	−6.21%	41,639
17	Malvern, AR μSA	33,451	+1.24%	33,040	+0.36%	32,923
18	Camden, AR μSA	26,363	−3.75%	27,389	−13.02%	31,488
19	Magnolia, AR μSA	21,894	−3.98%	22,801	−7.13%	24,552
20	Forrest City, AR μSA	21,800	−5.59%	23,090	−19.06%	28,528
21	Arkadelphia, AR μSA	20,938	−2.37%	21,446	−6.74%	22,995
	Fort Smith, AR-OK MSA	234,140	+3.05%	227,213	−1.25%	230,083
	Memphis, TN-MS-AR MSA	1,341,412	−0.30%	1,345,425	+1.55%	1,324,829
	Texarkana, TX-AR MSA	146,816	−0.48%	147,519	−1.13%	149,198

The four combined statistical areas of the State of Arkansas (Note: For CSAs comprising populations from multiple states, they are listed twice to show both their intrastate population within that CSA as well as the CSA's total population. Only the intrastate population is ranked.)
2025 rank	Combined statistical area	Population				
2025 rank	Combined statistical area	2025 estimate	Change	2020 Census	Change	2010 Census
1	Little Rock-North Little Rock, AR CSA	927,903	+3.14%	899,663	+4.25%	862,957
2	Jonesboro-Paragould, AR CSA	186,851	+3.85%	179,932	+10.31%	163,116
3	Hot Springs-Malvern, AR CSA	133,146	−0.06%	133,220	+3.31%	128,947
4	Memphis-Forrest City, TN-MS-AR CSA (AR)	68,010	−4.55%	71,253	−9.99%	79,160
	Memphis-Forrest City, TN-MS-AR CSA	1,383,061	−0.49%	1,389,905	+0.77%	1,379,238

== See also ==
- Geography of Arkansas
  - Demographics of Arkansas
