= Pine Bluff micropolitan area =

Pine Bluff Micropolitan Area
- Micropolitan Statistical Area
- Pine Bluff, AR; Micropolitan Statistical Area
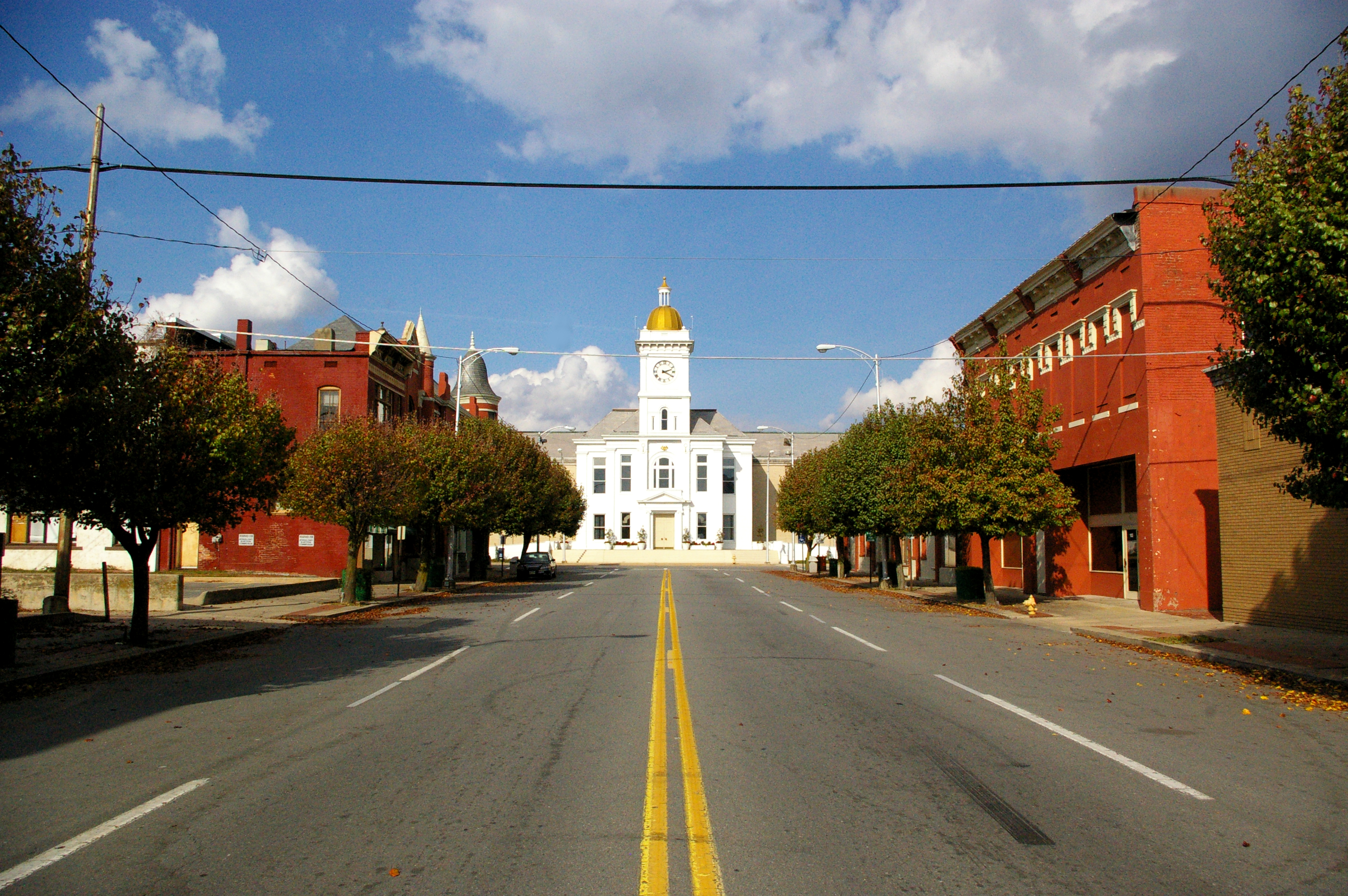
- Downtown Pine Bluff
Map of the Pine Bluff, AR μSA
City of Pine Bluff
Pine Bluff μSA
Other Areas in the Little Rock, AR CSA
- Country: United States
- State: Arkansas
- Largest city: Pine Bluff

Population (2023 (est.))
  - Micropolitan Statistical Area: 71,039
  - Metro: 913,536
- Time zone: UTC-6 (CST)
  - Summer (DST): UTC-5 (CDT)

The Pine Bluff Micropolitan Statistical Area, as defined by the United States Census Bureau, is a two-county region in Southeast Arkansas, anchored by the city of Pine Bluff. As of 2023, the total population was estimated at 71,039. It is also a component of the larger Central Arkansas region which had an estimated 913,536 people in 2023.

== History ==
The Pine Bluff region had long been a metropolitan statistical area (MSA). As of the 2010 census, the MSA had a population of 100,258. The metro area's population declined by 12.47% between 2010 and 2020, more than any other metropolitan area in the United States. At the 2020 Census, the Pine Bluff MSA definition included Jefferson, Cleveland, and Lincoln counties.

A proposal by the Office of Management and Budget (OMB) to increase the threshold for a metropolitan statistical area from 50,000 in population to 100,000 threatened Pine Bluff's status as a metropolitan area in 2021 (along with three other Arkansas metros: Hot Springs, Jonesboro, and Texarkana). It was announced this effort had been rebuffed by a group of members of Congress a few months later. However, on July 21, 2023, the OMB redefined the United States statistical areas, including Arkansas statistical areas, which demoted Pine Bluff to a micropolitan area.

== Counties ==
- Cleveland
- Jefferson

== Cities and towns ==
- Altheimer
- Humphrey
- Kingsland
- New Edinburg (unincorporated)
- Pine Bluff (Principal city)
- Redfield
- Rison
- Sherrill
- Wabbaseka
- White Hall (Suburb of Pine Bluff)
