= Brookland High School =

Location
- 100 West School Street; Brookland, Arkansas 72417; United States
- 35°54′27″N 90°34′38″W

Information
- School type: Public comprehensive
- Status: Open
- School district: Brookland School District
- Superintendent: Brett Bunch
- CEEB code: 040300
- NCES School ID: 050364000116
- Principal: Wesley Miller
- Teaching staff: 38.85 (on FTE basis)
- Grades: 10-12
- Enrollment: 630 (2023-2024)
- Student to teacher ratio: 16.22
- Education system: ADE Smart Core
- Classes offered: Regular, Advanced Placement (AP)
- Colors: Red and black
- Athletics: Football, Volleyball, Bowling, Golf, Basketball, Tennis, Baseball, Softball, Track, Cheer
- Athletics conference: 4A Region 3
- Mascot: Bearcat
- Team name: Brookland Bearcats
- Accreditation: ADE
- Feeder schools: Brookland Junior High School (7-9)
- Website: www.brooklandbearcats.org/o/bhs

Brookland High School is a comprehensive public high school located in the fringe town of Brookland, Arkansas, United States. The school provides secondary education for students in grades 9 through 12. It is one of nine public high schools in Craighead County, Arkansas and the sole high school administered by the Brookland School District.

In addition to Brookland it serves a part of the Jonesboro city limits.

== Academics ==
Brookland High School is accredited by the Arkansas Department of Education (ADE) and has been accredited by AdvancED since 1991. The assumed course of study follows the Smart Core curriculum developed by the ADE. Students complete regular (core and elective) and career focus coursework and exams and may take Advanced Placement (AP) courses and exams with the opportunity to receive college credit.

== Athletics ==
The Brookland High School mascot and athletic emblem is the bearcat with red and black serving as the school colors.

The Brookland compete in interscholastic activities within the 4A Classification via the 4A Region 3 Conference, as administered by the Arkansas Activities Association. The Bearcats field teams in Soccer (girls/boys), football, bowling (boys/girls), golf (boys/girls), basketball (boys/girls), cheer, competitive cheer, competitive dance, baseball, softball, and track and field (boys/girls).

The Bearcats boys basketball team won its first state championship in 2014. They beat the Lonoke Jackrabbits 60-50 in the state championship at Summit Arena in Hot Springs, Arkansas on March 15, 2014, finishing the season on a 21 game win streak. In 2009–10, the Brookland boys basketball team recorded three state records with scoring 311 three-point goals in a season and 20 three-pointers in a game, along with the largest combined score in a single game of 221 in a Brookland 117, Tuckerman 104 game in 2010.

The girls bowling team is one of the state's most successful by winning three state championships between 2008 and 2010.

Both competitive dance and competitive cheer won 4A State Championships in 2022.
