= Brookland School District =

School district in Arkansas, United States

Location
- 200 West School Street; Brookland, Arkansas 72417 United States

District information
- Grades: PK–12
- Superintendent: Brett Bunch
- Accreditation: AdvancED
- Schools: 5
- NCES District ID: 0503640

Students and staff
- Students: 3,041
- Teachers: 142.50 (on FTE basis)
- Student–teacher ratio: 14.51
- Athletic conference: 4A Region 3 (2012–20), 5A East (2020-Present)
- District mascot: Bearcat
- Colors: Red Black

Other information
- Website: www.brooklandbearcats.org

Brookland School District is a public school district based in Brookland, Arkansas, United States. The Brookland School District provides early childhood, elementary and secondary education for more than 1,970 prekindergarten through grade 12 students at its five facilities within north-central Craighead County, Arkansas.

Brookland School District is accredited by the Arkansas Department of Education (ADE) and AdvancED.

In addition to Brookland it serves a part of the Jonesboro city limits.

== Schools ==
- Brookland High School—serving more than 450 students in grades 10 through 12.
- Brookland Junior High School—serving more than 450 students in grades 7 through 9.
- Brookland Middle School—serving more than 550 students in grades 5 through 6; receives Title I funding.
- Brookland Elementary School—serving more than 500 students in kindergarten through grade 2; receives Title I funding.
- Brookland Primary School—serving more than 150 students.
