= Bart Barber =

American pastor and author

- Education: Riverside High School 1988 Baylor University; Southwestern Baptist Theological Seminary (M. Div, Ph. D.)
- Occupations: Pastor, Former President of the Southern Baptist Convention
- Spouse: Tracy Barber
- Website: praisegodbarebones.blogspot.com

Bart Barber is an American Southern Baptist pastor and conservative speaker. He is the former president of the Southern Baptist Convention (2022–2024).

== Education ==
As a teen, Barber attended Riverside High School in Lake City, Arkansas, graduating in 1988. He went on to complete undergraduate studies at Baylor University and then afterward receiving a Master of Divinity degree and a PhD in Church History from Southwestern Baptist Theological Seminary.

== Career ==
Since 1999, Barber has served as the pastor of First Baptist Church of Farmersville, Texas, a Southern Baptist congregation of about 320 people.

Barber was the chairman of the 2022 SBC Resolutions Committee and served on the 2021 committee. He was a featured speaker at the SBC Pastors’ Conference in 2017, was elected first vice president of the SBC (2013–2014). At the state level, he served on the Southern Baptists of Texas Convention executive board from (2008–2014) and was a trustee for Southwestern Baptist Theological Seminary (2009–2019). He also previously taught as an adjunct professor at Southwestern (2006 through 2009).

In response to the widespread sexual abuse cases in Southern Baptist churches, Barber helped craft Texas HB 4345 in 2019. This bill indemnified churches of liability when sharing information about credible sexual abuse accusations.

=== Southern Baptist Convention presidency ===
Barber served as president of the Southern Baptist Convention, the largest American Evangelical denomination for two terms. He was first elected in Anaheim, California at the 2022 Annual Meeting, and ran for a second consecutive term at the 2023 Annual Meeting in New Orleans, Louisiana. During his first term, he was featured in multiple news outlets speaking on behalf of the convention, including a wide-ranging interview with Anderson Cooper on CBS's news magazine 60 Minutes.

== Personal life ==
Barber resides in Farmersville, TX with his wife Tracy.

Preceded by Ed Litton	President of the Southern Baptist Convention; 2022-2024	Succeeded by Clint Pressley
