= Herman, Arkansas =

Unincorporated community in Arkansas, US

Coordinates: 35°50′13″N 90°48′05″W

Herman is an unincorporated community in Craighead County, Arkansas, United States.

== Etymology ==
The locale of Herman began as a railroad stop, with the post office being called Bellefield. The name of the railroad stop was changed to Herman by Francis John Borgman, who owned a lumber mill and ran the post office at this railroad stop which was right at his house, after his son John Allen Borgman had a baby boy named Herman in 1898. In the early 1900s, Frank Borgman petitioned the United States Postal Service to also change the post office to Herman but they declined, responding that it was too similar to the post office of Harman nearby. But in 1920, after Herman Francis Borgman married, the post office changed its name to Herman.

== Education ==
The Westside Consolidated School District operates 3 schools in Herman, which includes:

- Westside Elementary School, serving more than 650 students in prekindergarten through grade 4 (PK–4).
- Westside Middle School, serving more than 350 students in grades 5 through 7.
- Westside High School, serving more than 550 students in grades 8 through 12.
