= Gavin Stone =

American baseball player (born 1998)

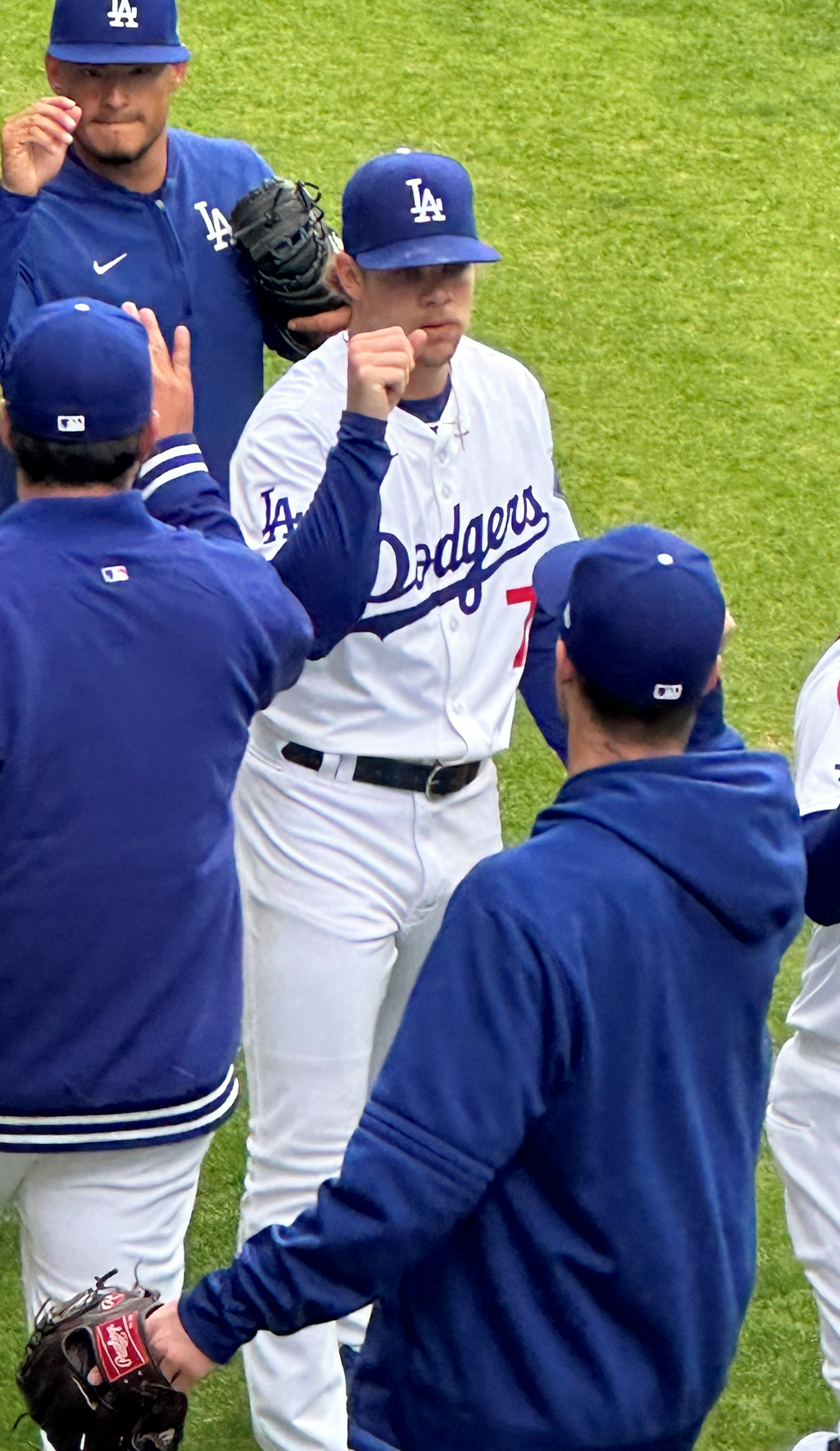
- Gavin Stone before a game with the Dodgers

Los Angeles Dodgers – No. 35
- Pitcher
- Born: October 15, 1998 (age 27); Lake City, Arkansas, U.S.
- Bats: Right Throws: Right

MLB debut
- May 3, 2023, for the Los Angeles Dodgers

MLB statistics (through 2024 season)
- Win–loss record: 12–6
- Earned run average: 4.52
- Strikeouts: 138
- Stats at Baseball Reference

Teams
- Los Angeles Dodgers (2023–2024)

Gavin Blaine Stone (born October 15, 1998) is an American professional baseball pitcher for the Los Angeles Dodgers of Major League Baseball (MLB). He made his MLB debut in 2023.

== Career ==
=== Amateur career ===
Stone attended Riverside High School in Lake City, Arkansas and the University of Central Arkansas, where he played college baseball for the Central Arkansas Bears. As a sophomore in 2019, he appeared in twenty games (two starts) and went 4–3 with a 1.52 ERA and 58 strikeouts over 47 1/3 innings. He made four starts in 2020 before the season was cancelled due to the COVID-19 pandemic. Stone also played collegiate summer baseball in the Northwoods League for the Battle Creek Bombers in 2019 and the Great Lakes Resorters in 2020.

=== Professional career ===
The Los Angeles Dodgers selected Stone in the fifth round, with the 159th overall pick, of the 2020 Major League Baseball draft. He signed for $100,000. Stone made his professional debut in 2021 with the Rancho Cucamonga Quakes and was promoted to the Great Lakes Loons in mid-August. Over 22 starts between the two teams, he went 2–3 with a 3.76 ERA and 138 strikeouts over 91 innings.

He returned to Great Lakes to open the 2022 season. After six starts in which he went 1–1 with a 1.44 ERA over 25 innings, he was promoted to the Tulsa Drillers. After 13 starts with Tulsa, in which he posted a 6–4 record, a 1.60 ERA, and 107 strikeouts over 73 1/3 innings, he was promoted to the Oklahoma City Dodgers in mid-August, where he had a 1.16 ERA in six starts and ended his season by striking out 11 in six scoreless innings against the Salt Lake Bees. For the 2022 minor league season, he was 9–6 with a 1.48 ERA in 121 2/3 innings in which he struck out 168 batters. Stone was selected by the Dodgers as their 2022 Branch Rickey Minor League Pitcher of the Year. Stone returned to Oklahoma City to open the 2023 season and he was called up to the majors for the first time on May 3, to start against the Philadelphia Phillies. In his debut, Stone allowed four earned runs on eight hits and two walks in four innings. He recorded one strikeout, of Nick Castellanos. On August 27, Stone picked up his first major league win against the Boston Red Sox. In the majors, he pitched in eight games (four starts) and gave up 31 earned runs in 31 innings (9.00 ERA) while he pitched in 21 games (19 starts) at Oklahoma City with a 7–4 record and 4.74 ERA with 120 strikeouts. Stone struck out ten in 6 1/3 innings to help Oklahoma City win the Pacific Coast League championship series.

During spring training in 2024, manager Dave Roberts announced that Stone would break camp as the team's fifth starter in the rotation. On June 26, Stone pitched a four hit complete game shutout against the Chicago White Sox, the first by a Dodgers rookie pitcher since Hyun-jin Ryu in 2013. Stone made a team high 25 starts for the Dodgers in 2024, with a 11–5 record and 3.53 ERA while striking out 116 batters. He was shut down on September 6 due to shoulder inflammation which ultimately ended his season. Stone underwent shoulder surgery on October 9 and it was announced that he would miss the 2025 season while recovering.

Stone was expected to compete for a rotation spot in 2026, however after pitching in one spring training game he experienced soreness in his shoulder and was shut down from throwing. he was placed on the 60-day injured list to start the season. Stone eventually began a rehab assignment with Triple-A Oklahoma City in August, showing some decent results. He wound up making six starts, pitching 15 1/3 innings with a 5.28 ERA on the rehab assignment but did not appear in the majors.

== Personal life ==
Stone grew up a St. Louis Cardinals fan.
