= Riverside School District (Arkansas) =

School district in Arkansas, United States

Riverside School District

Location
- 2006 Highway 18, Suite C Lake City, Arkansas 72437 United States

District information
- Grades: PK-12
- Established: 1985
- Superintendent: Jeff Priest
- Schools: 3

Students and staff
- Students: 835 (as of 2007-08)
- Faculty: 86.0 (FTE) (as of 2007-08)
- Staff: 63.0 (FTE) (as of 2007-08)
- Student–teacher ratio: 9.7 (as of 2007-08)
- Colors: Maroon; Gray

Other information
- Website: riversiderebels.net

Riverside School District is a public school district in Craighead County, Arkansas. It serves Lake City and Caraway.

== History ==
Riverside School District was created on July 1, 1985, by the consolidation of the Caraway and Lake City school districts.

In October 2009, construction began on a new junior-senior high school building in Lake City, adjacent to the current West Elementary building.

The new High School building's construction finished in late 2011.

== Schools ==
- Riverside High School (7-12)
- Riverside East Elementary School (PK-6)
- Riverside West Elementary School (PK-6)
