= Westside Consolidated School District =

School district in Arkansas

Location
- 1630 AR 91 West; Jonesboro, Arkansas 72404 United States

District information
- Motto: leading the Way in Educational Excellence
- Grades: PK–12
- Established: 1966
- Superintendent: Mr. Chris George
- Accreditation: Arkansas Department of Education
- Schools: 3
- NCES District ID: 0504020

Students and staff
- Students: 1,669
- Teachers: 128.42 (on FTE basis)
- Staff: 258.42 (on FTE basis)
- Student–teacher ratio: 13.00
- Athletic conference: 4A Region 3 (2012–14)
- District mascot: Warriors
- Colors: Scarlet White

Other information
- Website: www.westsideschools.org

Westside Consolidated School District #5 is a public school district headquartered in unincorporated Craighead County, Arkansas, near Jonesboro.

The district encompasses 207.99 square miles (538.7 km^{2}) of land, and serves several rural communities in the Craighead and Lawrence counties. It principally serves Bono, Cash, and Egypt, and it also serves portions of Jonesboro. Of the three main communities, as of 2003 Bono is the largest.

All schools and the district are accredited by the Arkansas Department of Education (ADE) and AdvancED.

== History ==
The school district opened in 1966, a consolidation of the Bono, Cash, and Egypt School districts.

In 1975, the Westside High School obtained accreditation from AdvancED (formerly North Central Association).

In 1994, the Westside Elementary School obtained accreditation from AdvancED.

In 1997, the Westside Middle School obtained accreditation from AdvancED.

James Dunivan served as superintendent beginning in 2000, and served as such until 2004, when he took that job at the Nettleton School District. James P. Best, previously the superintendent of the Heber Springs School District, replaced Dunivan.

On April 2, 2025 a tornado hit the school, causing moderate property damage on the campus.

== 1998 Westside Middle School shooting ==
On March 24, 1998, Westside Middle School experienced a school shooting. 13-year-old Mitchell Johnson and 11-year-old Andrew Golden opened fire on the school, shooting and killing five people with multiple weapons, and both were arrested when they attempted to flee the scene. Ten others were wounded. Golden and Johnson were convicted of five murders and ten assaults, and were imprisoned until each turned 21 years of age. After the 1992 Lindhurst High School shooting that killed four people in Olivehurst, California, the massacre was the deadliest non-college school shooting in contemporary U.S. history until the April 1999 Columbine High School massacre. As of 2026, the incident is the deadliest mass shooting at a middle school in U.S. history. As of 2008, there was a perception that the schools were unsafe due to the attack.

== Schools ==
The district's schools include:

- Westside Elementary School, serving more than 650 students in prekindergarten through grade 4 (PK–4).
- Westside Middle School, serving more than 350 students in grades 5 through 7.
- Westside High School, serving more than 550 students in grades 8 through 12.

Previously the district had a separate Westside Junior High School.
