= Maxie Theatre =

- Formerly listed on the U.S. National Register of Historic Places
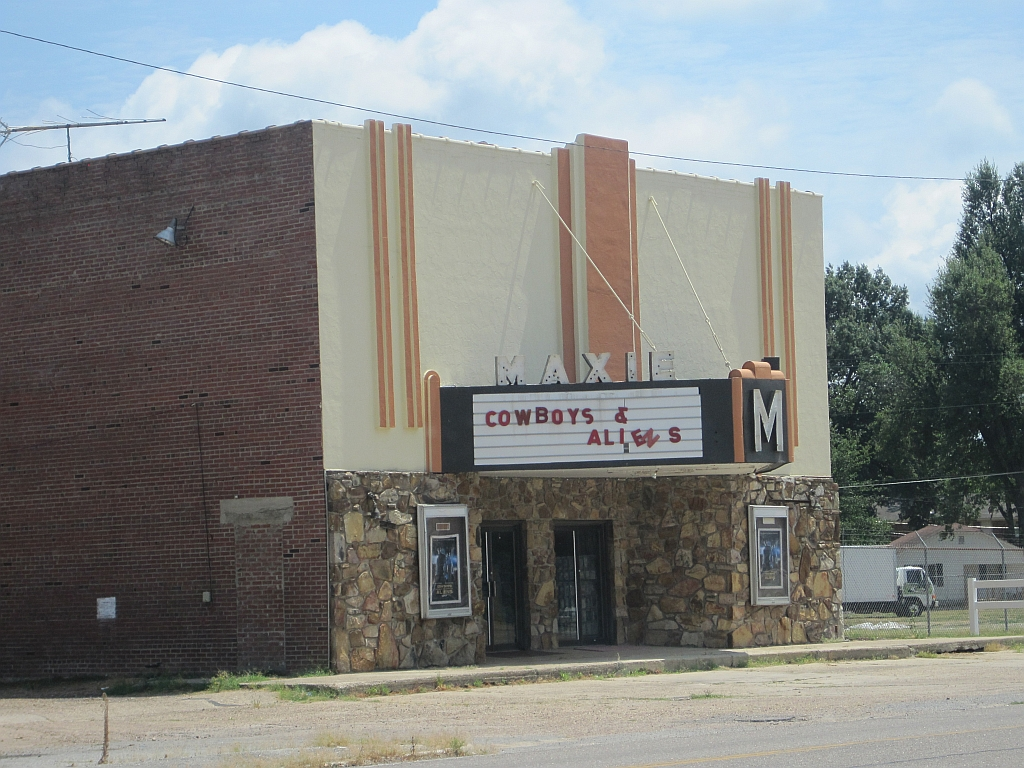

- Location within Arkansas Location within the United States
- Location: 136 Arkansas Highway 463 South, Trumann, Arkansas
- Coordinates: 35°40′14″N 90°30′59″W
- Area: less than one acre
- NRHP reference No.: 10000933

Significant dates
- Added to NRHP: April 7, 2011
- Removed from NRHP: September 8, 2020

The Maxie Theatre was a historic movie theatre at 136 Arkansas Highway 463 South in Trumann, Arkansas. It is a single-screen theatre, housed in a large Art Deco structure built in 1948–9 by Zell Jaynes. At the time of its opening it featured the latest in amenities, including air conditioning, upholstered seats, and a fancy curtain to cover the screen. It also had a purpose-built segregated seating area for African-American in the balcony, with separate entrance, ticketing, and concession facilities. Until its closure in 2012 the theatre was one of oldest continuously operating businesses in Trumann and was the town's only theatre.

The building was listed on the National Register of Historic Places in 2011, and was delisted in 2020.

== See also ==
- National Register of Historic Places listings in Poinsett County, Arkansas
