= Arkansas Highway 173 (1940–1979) =

Former state highway in Arkansas, United States

Highway 173

Route information
- Maintained by AHD
- Length: 1.3 mi (2.1 km)
- Existed: c. 1940–April 27, 1979

Major junctions
- South end: US 63
- North end: AR 1

Location
- Country: United States
- State: Arkansas
- Counties: Craighead

Highway system
- Arkansas Highway System; Interstate; US; State; Business; Spurs; Suffixed; Scenic; Heritage
← AR 173	→ AR 174

Highway 173 (AR 173, Ark. 173, and Hwy. 173) is a former state highway in Craighead County, Arkansas. Between designation as a state highway in 1940 and decommissioning to the city street system in 1979, it was maintained by the Arkansas Highway Department (AHD), now known as the Arkansas Department of Transportation (ArDOT).

== Route description ==
Highway 173 began at US Highway 63 (US 63, present-day AR 18) east of Jonesboro, the county seat of Craighead County. It ran due north as a section line road past a Civilian Conservation Corps camp through an unincorporated area. Continuing north, AR 173 crossed the St. Louis Southwestern Railway tracks and St. Louis and San Francisco Railway tracks and passed through the campus of Arkansas State College (now known as Arkansas State University), an area known as Aggie (the former nickname of the college's athletic teams). AR 173 continued north a short distance to AR 1 (present day AR 91), where it terminated.

== History ==
Highway 173 first appeared on the 1940 state highway map east of Jonesboro. By 1961, the area had been annexed into Jonesboro, and the Arkansas State Highway Commission extended the designation south to AR 18 (Nettleton Road). On February 22, 1967, the designation was extended south to US 63 along a new terrain bypass (current I-555). On November 26, 1969, the Highway Commission approved a request by the Craighead county judge to accept a segment of AR 226 into the county road system in exchange for extending AR 173 south to AR 1 at Apt (current AR 1B); this section was renumbered to AR 1 on August 28, 1974 following construction of improvements along the route.

The remainder of AR 173 was deleted on April 27, 1979 in a swap involving many highways requested by the Craighead County Judge.

== Major intersections ==
This table reflects the highway's junctions upon creation. The entire route was in Craighead County.

Location	mi	km	Destinations	Notes
	0.0	0.0	US 63	Southern terminus
	1.3	2.1	AR 1	Northern terminus
1.000 mi = 1.609 km; 1.000 km = 0.621 mi
