= Westside High School (Craighead County, Arkansas) =

Westside Consolidated High School

Location
- 1630 Hwy 91 W Jonesboro, Arkansas 72404; United States
- Coordinates: 35°51′22″N 90°48′10″W

Information
- Status: Open
- School district: Westside Consolidated School District
- NCES District ID: 0504020
- Oversight: Arkansas Department of Education (ADE)
- NCES School ID: 050402000146
- Faculty: 47.60 (on FTE basis)
- Grades: 8–12
- Enrollment: 591 (2010–11)
  - Grade 8: 117
  - Grade 9: 131
  - Grade 10: 129
  - Grade 11: 108
  - Grade 12: 106
- Student to teacher ratio: 12.54
- Education system: ADE Smart Core curriculum
- Classes offered: Regular, Advanced Placement, concurrent
- Campus type: Rural
- Colors: Scarlet and white
- Athletics conference: 4A Region 3 (2012–14)
- Mascot: Warrior
- Team name: Westside Consolidated Warriors
- Accreditation: ADE
- National ranking: No. 149 of 2,008
- Feeder schools: Westside Elementary School
- Affiliation: Arkansas Activities Association (AAA)
- Website: whs.westsideschools.org/o/whs

Westside High School is a comprehensive public junior/senior high school serving grades eight through twelve in unincorporated Craighead County, Arkansas, United States, in a rural area near Jonesboro. Westside High School is one of eight public high schools in the county and is the sole high school managed by the Westside Consolidated School District. The school is alternatively referred to as Jonesboro Westside or Westside Consolidated.

The school district, and therefore the school's attendance zone, occupies sections of Craighead and Lawrence counties. It principally serves Bono, Cash, and Egypt, and it also serves portions of Jonesboro.

== Academics ==
The assumed course of study at Westside High School is the Smart Core curriculum developed by the Arkansas Department of Education (ADE). Students engage in regular and Advanced Placement (AP) coursework and exams to obtain at least 24 units before graduation. Students also have the choice of participating in any of two possible concurrent courses. Exceptional students have been recognized as National Merit Finalists and participated in Arkansas Governor's School.

Westside is associated with Cultural Academic Student Exchange (CASE), and hosts foreign exchange students almost every year from all around the world.

== Athletics ==
The Westside High School mascot is the warrior with scarlet and white serving as the school colors.

For the 2012-2014 seasons, the Westside Warriors participated in the 4A 3 Conference. Competition is primarily sanctioned by the Arkansas Activities Association with the Warriors competing in baseball, basketball (boys/girls), bowling, cheer, football, soccer (boys/girls), softball, tennis (boys/girls), track and field (boys/girls), volleyball, and marching band.

- Warrior Dome: The Warriors play their indoor sports in the Warrior Dome. The Warrior Dome is one of the toughest places to play as a visiting team, especially for boys' basketball.
- Basketball: The boys' team won a state title in 2010 and state runner up in 2011 and 2017. The Warriors were one of the most dominant teams in 4A last decade. They are coached by Mark Whitmire and assisted by David Smith.
- Volleyball: The volleyball team is one of the state's most successful, having won six state championships (1983, 1992, 1994, 2001, 2007, 2009). Westside was led by Glenda Patterson between 1973 and 2010, who is the all-time winningest coach in Arkansas high school volleyball history with a 783-205 record. Westside's volleyball team is now coached by Julie Tubbs.
- Dance: The dance team won consecutive state titles in 2011 and 2012. in 2012, the dance team won 16 first place trophies out of 17 competitions entered.
- Tennis: The girls' tennis teams won consecutive state titles in 2007 and 2008.
