= Goobertown, Arkansas =

- Unincorporated community
- Location within Arkansas Location within the United States
- Coordinates: 35°57′05″N 90°34′32″W
- Country: United States
- State: Arkansas
- County: Craighead
- Elevation: 312 ft (95 m)
- Time zone: UTC-6 (Central (CST))
  - Summer (DST): UTC-5 (CDT)
- Area code: 870
- GNIS feature ID: 77034

Goobertown is an unincorporated community located in Craighead County, Arkansas, United States. Goobertown is located on U.S. Route 49, 10.4 miles (16.7 km) northeast from Jonesboro.

== History ==
Goobertown was settled by Confederate war veterans, who decided to name their community Goobertown after the crops they grew around the area: peanuts, contemporarily referred to as "goobers".
