= Nettleton School District (Arkansas) =

School district in Arkansas

Location
- 3300 One Place; Jonesboro, Arkansas 72401 United States

District information
- Grades: PK–12
- Established: 1896
- Superintendent: Dr. Karen Curtner
- Accreditation: AdvancED
- Schools: 7
- NCES District ID: 0510440

Students and staff
- Students: 3,290
- Teachers: 227.26 (on FTE basis)
- Student–teacher ratio: 14.48
- Athletic conference: 5A East (2012–14)
- District mascot: Raiders
- Colors: Black; Gold

Other information
- Website: www.nettletonschools.net

Nettleton School District (or Nettleton Public Schools) is a public school district based in Jonesboro, Arkansas, United States. The school district provides early childhood, elementary and secondary education for more than 3,200 kindergarten through grade 12 students at its seven facilities at Jonesboro in Craighead County.

Nettleton School District is accredited by the Arkansas Department of Education (ADE) and has been accredited by AdvancED since 2007.

== Schools ==
=== Secondary schools ===
- Nettleton High School—serving more than 850 students in grades 9 through 12.
- Nettleton Junior High School—serving more than 450 students in grades 7 through 8.

=== Elementary schools ===
- Fox Meadow Elementary School—serving approximately 400 students in kindergarten through grade 2.
- Fox Meadow Intermediate Center—serving approximately 350 students in grades 3 through 5.
- University Heights Intermediate Center—serving approximately 400 students in grades 3 through 5.
- Nettleton STEAM —serving approximately 500 students in grade 3-6.
- University Heights Elementary School—serving approximately 350 students in kindergarten through grade 2.
