= Bay, Arkansas =

- City
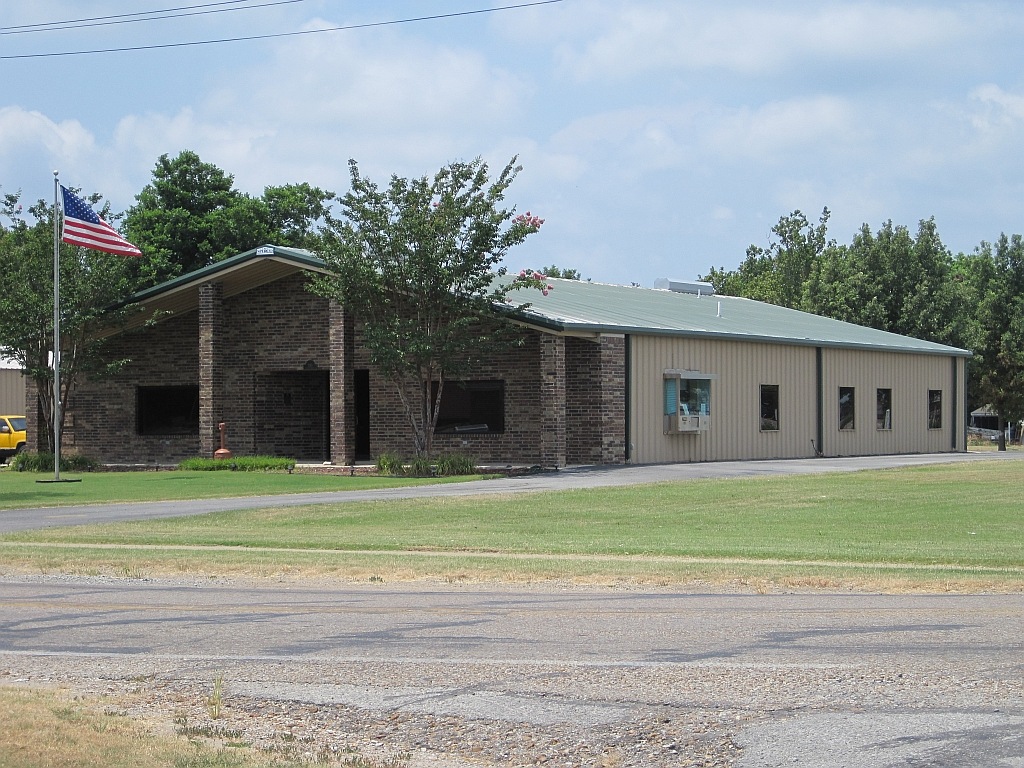
- Bay City Hall, July 2011

- Location of Bay in Craighead County, Arkansas.
- Coordinates: 35°45′04″N 90°33′12″W
- Country: United States
- State: Arkansas
- County: Craighead

Area
  - Total: 3.10 sq mi (8.02 km^{2})
  - Land: 3.09 sq mi (8.00 km^{2})
  - Water: 0.0077 sq mi (0.02 km^{2})
- Elevation: 226 ft (69 m)

Population (2020)
  - Total: 1,876
  - Estimate (2025): 1,803 ▼
  - Density: 607.6/sq mi (234.59/km^{2})
- Time zone: UTC-6 (Central (CST))
  - Summer (DST): UTC-5 (CDT)
- ZIP code: 72411
- Area code: 870
- FIPS code: 05-04180
- GNIS feature ID: 2403823
- Website: cityofbayar.gov

Bay is a city in Craighead County, Arkansas, United States. The population was 1,876 at the 2020 census. It is included in the Jonesboro Metropolitan Statistical Area.

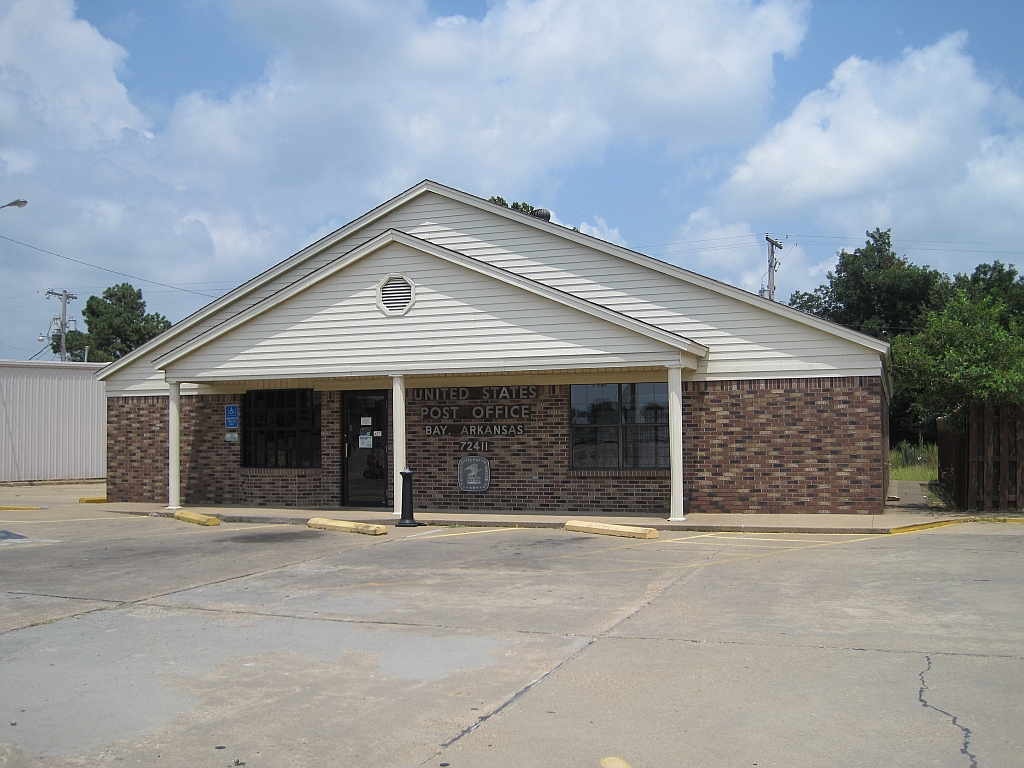
Post office

== Geography ==
Bay is located in the Arkansas Delta. According to the United States Census Bureau, the city has a total area of 3.3 square miles (8.5 km^{2}), all land.

Ecologically, Bay is located within the St. Francis Lowlands ecoregion within the larger Mississippi Alluvial Plain. The St. Francis Lowlands are a flat region mostly covered with row crop agriculture today, though also containing sand blows and sunken lands remaining from the 1811–12 New Madrid earthquakes. Waterways have mostly been channelized, causing loss of aquatic and riparian wildlife habitat. The St. Francis Sunken Lands Wildlife Management Area, which preserves some of the bottomland hardwood forest typical of this ecoregion prior to development for row agriculture lies east of Bay along the St. Francis River.

== History ==
Located at 35.756882,-90.56504, there are only 2 remaining mounds of society who inhabited the area between 1200 and 1400AD. The Bay group itself culturally belongs to the Lawhorn Phase, a society which existed along both sides of the St. Francis River north of Marked Tree, Arkansas.

At 3:01 PM on April 27, 2011, a tornado hit Bay as part of the 2011 Super Outbreak. The tornado was rated low-end EF2, with estimated wind speeds of 115 miles per hour (185 km/h; 100 kn). The tornado lifted a carport and other light debris at the jonesboro Airport; its path of destruction was 200 yards (180 m) wide and the tornado travelled a path of 0.7 miles (1.1 km).

=== List of highways ===
- Interstate 555
- AR 158
- AR 463

== Demographics ==
Historical population
Census	Pop.	Note	%±
1930	300		—
1940	357		19.0%
1950	500		40.1%
1960	627		25.4%
1970	751		19.8%
1980	1,605		113.7%
1990	1,660		3.4%
2000	1,800		8.4%
2010	1,801		0.1%
2020	1,876		4.2%
2025 (est.)	1,803	▼	−3.9%
U.S. Decennial Census; 2014 Estimate

=== 2020 census ===
As of the 2020 census, Bay had a population of 1,876. The median age was 37.6 years. 25.4% of residents were under the age of 18 and 16.6% of residents were 65 years of age or older. For every 100 females there were 89.3 males, and for every 100 females age 18 and over there were 86.2 males age 18 and over.

0.0% of residents lived in urban areas, while 100.0% lived in rural areas.

There were 762 households in Bay, including 532 families, of which 33.9% had children under the age of 18 living in them. Of all households, 45.1% were married-couple households, 15.5% were households with a male householder and no spouse or partner present, and 32.0% were households with a female householder and no spouse or partner present. About 26.1% of all households were made up of individuals and 13.8% had someone living alone who was 65 years of age or older.

There were 805 housing units, of which 5.3% were vacant. The homeowner vacancy rate was 1.6% and the rental vacancy rate was 6.8%.

Bay racial composition
Race	Number	Percentage
White (non-Hispanic)	1,684	89.77%
Black or African American (non-Hispanic)	62	3.3%
Native American	10	0.53%
Asian	2	0.11%
Pacific Islander	2	0.11%
Other/Mixed	89	4.74%
Hispanic or Latino	27	1.44%

=== 2000 census ===
As of the census of 2000, there were 1,800 people, 690 households, and 518 families residing in the city. The population density was 536.7 inhabitants per square mile (207.2/km^{2}). There were 734 housing units at an average density of 218.8 per square mile (84.5/km^{2}). The racial makeup of the city was 95.39% White, 2.94% Black or African American, 0.17% Native American, 0.78% from other races, and 0.72% from two or more races. 1.50% of the population were Hispanic or Latino of any race.

There were 690 households, out of which 35.9% had children under the age of 18 living with them, 59.0% were married couples living together, 12.9% had a female householder with no husband present, and 24.8% were non-families. 22.9% of all households were made up of individuals, and 10.9% had someone living alone who was 65 years of age or older. The average household size was 2.61 and the average family size was 3.07.

In the city, the population was spread out, with 27.7% under the age of 18, 8.2% from 18 to 24, 28.3% from 25 to 44, 22.7% from 45 to 64, and 13.2% who were 65 years of age or older. The median age was 35 years. For every 100 females, there were 94.4 males. For every 100 females age 18 and over, there were 88.2 males.

The median income for a household in the city was $29,828, and the median income for a family was $35,833. Males had a median income of $28,594 versus $19,732 for females. The per capita income for the city was $12,743. About 13.3% of families and 15.5% of the population were below the poverty line, including 21.5% of those under age 18 and 19.7% of those age 65 or over.

== Notable person ==
- Wally Moon, baseball player
