= Riverside High School (Lake City, Arkansas) =

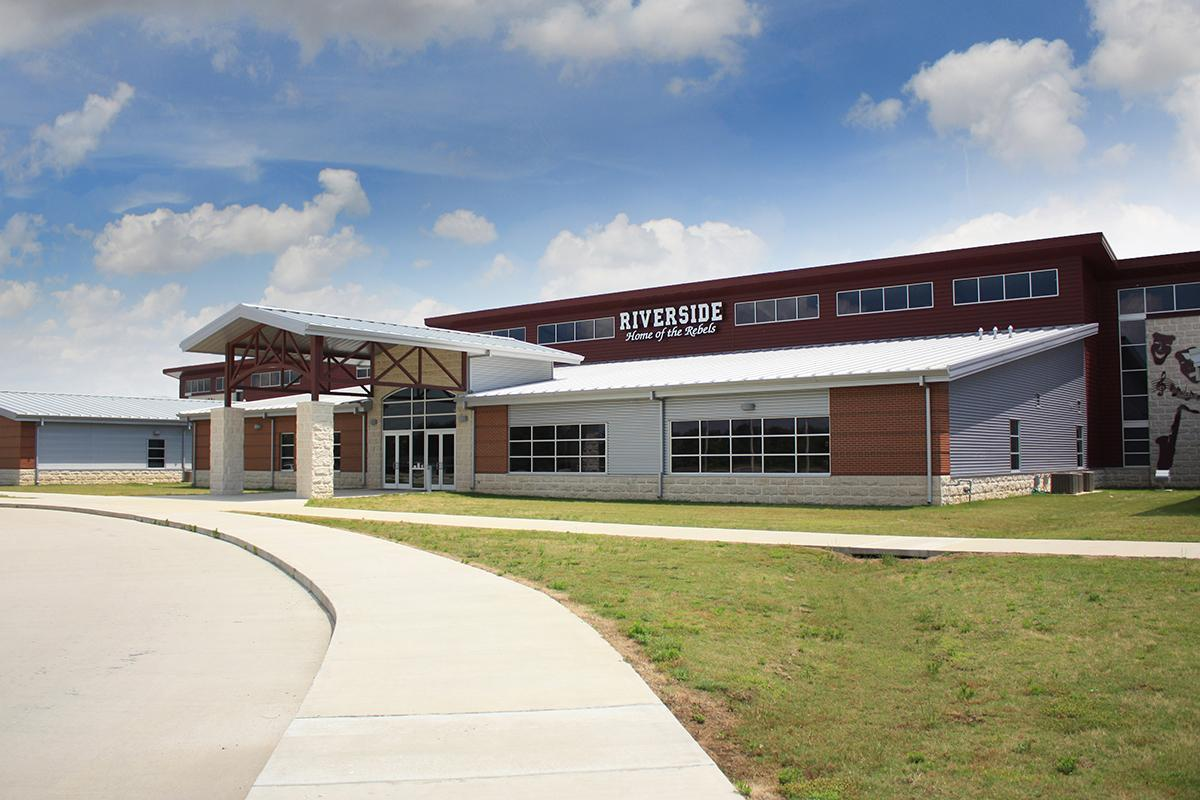

Location
- 2007 Highway 18; Lake City, Craighead County, Arkansas 72437; United States; 35°49′13.9″N 90°27′15″W

Information
- Other names: Riverside, Riverside Junior High, Lake City School, Riverside School District
- School type: Public comprehensive
- Motto: Rebels Raise The Bar
- School district: Riverside School District
- NCES District ID: 050001201538
- CEEB code: 041335
- NCES School ID: 0500012
- Principal: Matt Ziegler
- Teaching staff: 34.80 (FTE)
- Grades: 7–12
- Enrollment: 353 (2023-2024)
- Student to teacher ratio: 10.14
- Campus size: Small-Medium
- Campus type: Closed
- Colors: Maroon and gray
- Athletics: Basketball, baseball, tennis, cross country, bowling, quiz bowl, cheerleading
- Athletics conference: 3A 3 (2016–2017)
- Mascot: Rebels
- Website: riversiderebels.net

Riverside High School is a secondary school for grades 7 through 12 in Lake City, Arkansas, United States. It is the sole high school serving the Riverside School District.

== History ==
On April 2, 2025, a large and destructive tornado tore through Lake City.

== Campus ==
Riverside High School is located in Lake City, alongside the Riverside West Elementary. The building was constructed in 2011 and houses grades 7–12. In 2020 an indoor baseball/softball complex was constructed on campus in-between the softball and baseball fields.

== Academics ==
The assumed course of study for students follows the Smart Core curriculum developed by the Arkansas Department of Education (ADE). Students complete regular (core and career focus) courses and exams and may select Advanced Placement (AP) coursework and exams that provide an opportunity for college credit before graduation.

Riverside's READ program allows students to obtain an associate degree through Black River Technical College simultaneously with their high school diploma, free of charge.

== Extracurricular activities ==
The school's teams, known as the Riverside Rebels, with maroon and gray serving as the school colors. For 2012–14, the Rebels compete in 2A Classification from the 2A Region 3 Conference as administered by the Arkansas Activities Association. Teams are fielded in golf (boys/girls), bowling (boys/girls), basketball (boys/girls), baseball, softball, tennis (boys/girls) and track and field (boys/girls).

- Tennis: The girls tennis team has won four state championships (2008, 2010, 2011, 2012).

== Notable alumni ==
- Bart Barber - 64th President of the Southern Baptist Convention
- Jon Milligan - Arkansas State Representative
- Gavin Stone - Major League Baseball Pitcher for the Los Angeles Dodgers
