= Arkansas Highway 463 =

Highway in Arkansas

Highway 463

Route information
- Maintained by ArDOT
- Length: 22.13 mi (35.61 km)

Major junctions
- South end: AR 14 in Payneway
- AR 69 in Trumann; AR 158 in Bay
- North end: AR 18 in Jonesboro

Location
- Country: United States
- State: Arkansas
- Counties: Poinsett, Craighead

Highway system
- Arkansas Highway System; Interstate; US; State; Business; Spurs; Suffixed; Scenic; Heritage
← I-440	→ I-530

Highway 463 (AR 463, Ark. 463 and Hwy. 463) is a north–south state highway in northeast Arkansas. The route of 22.13 miles (35.61 km) runs from Highway 14 very near I-555 at Payneway north to Highway 18 in Jonesboro. The route is a redesignation of former U.S. Route 63, which has since been rerouted onto US 49.

== Route description ==
The route begins at a T intersection with Highway 14 at the unincorporated community of Payneway 0.4 miles (0.64 km) west of I-555. Highway 463 runs along a range line north to intersect Highway 214 before crossing the freeway and entering Trumann. Highway 463 intersects Highway 69S before passing the Maxie Theatre on the National Register of Historic Places. Further north, AR 463 has junctions with AR 198, AR 69, and AR 214 before exiting Trumann and entering Craighead County.

The route has an overlap with Highway 158 in Bay and a junction with I-555 before entering Jonesboro and terminating at I-555.

== Major intersections ==
County	Location	mi (Note: Although Arkansas highways normally terminate when intersected by a route of greater importance, Highway 463's history as a former alignment of US 63 is reflected when intersecting state highways of a lesser number. Although routes of a lower number and the same class usually take priority at a concurrency, AR 463 still has preference to state routes but not US routes along its path.)	km	Destinations	Notes
Poinsett	Payneway	0.00	0.00	AR 14 to I-555 – Harrisburg, Newport, Marked Tree	Southern terminus
Poinsett		3.90	6.28	AR 214 west	Eastern terminus of AR 214
Poinsett		5.92	9.53	I-555 – Jonesboro, Marked Tree	Exit 24 on I-555
Poinsett	Trumann	7.74	12.46	AR 69S east (Ozark Avenue)	Western terminus of AR 69S
Poinsett	Trumann	9.15	14.73	AR 198 west (Main Street)	Eastern terminus of AR 198
Poinsett	Trumann	9.76	15.71	AR 69 (Speedway Street)	
Poinsett	Trumann	10.60	17.06	AR 214 (Industrial Park Access Road)	
Craighead	Bay	14.76	23.75	AR 158 east (Lunsford Avenue)	Southern end of AR 158 concurrency
Craighead	Bay	15.93	25.64	I-555 – Jonesboro	Exit 35 on I-555
Craighead	Bay	16.01	25.77	AR 158 west (Lawson Road)	Northern end of AR 158 concurrency
Craighead	Jonesboro	20.53	33.04	I-555 – Memphis, Hoxie	Northern terminus; exit 40 on I-555
1.000 mi = 1.609 km; 1.000 km = 0.621 mi

== See also ==
- List of state highways in Arkansas
- Arkansas Highway 163
