= Valley View School District (Arkansas) =

School district in Arkansas, United States

Location
- 2131 Valley View Drive; Jonesboro, Arkansas 72404 Northeast Arkansas United States

District information
- Motto: Excellence in Education for All
- Grades: PK–12
- Established: 1925
- Superintendent: Roland Popejoy
- Schools: 4
- NCES District ID: 0513380

Students and staff
- Students: 2878
- Teachers: 207 (on FTE basis)
- Staff: 118 (on FTE basis)
- Student–teacher ratio: 11:1
- Athletic conference: 5A East
- District mascot: Blazers
- Colors: Blue Gold

Other information
- Website: www.valleyviewschools.net

Valley View School District is a public school district based in the southwest side of Jonesboro, Arkansas, United States. The Valley View School District provides early childhood, elementary and secondary education for more than 2,500 students in the Jonesboro, Arkansas area.

Valley View School District is accredited by the Arkansas Department of Education (ADE).

== Schools ==
Valley View School District (LEA 1612000)
Name	LEA	Grades Served	Enrollment	Letter Grade
Valley View Elementary School	1612047	PK-2	692	A
Valley View Intermediate School	1612050	3-6	854	A
Valley View Junior High School	1612051	7-9	695	A
Valley View High School	1612048	10-12	692	B

Source: Arkansas Department of Information

== Controversies ==
The school district attracted significant controversy in early 2021 when two elementary physical education teachers, Nancy Best and Cindi Talbot, participated in the January 6 United States Capitol attack. In public statements, Superintendent Bryan Russell defended the teachers.
