= Bowman, Arkansas =

Bowman
- Census-designated place
- Bowman's position in Arkansas. Bowman (the United States)
- Coordinates: 35°48′53″N 90°30′10″W
- Country: United States
- State: Arkansas
- County: Craighead
- Elevation: 236 ft (72 m)

Population (2020)
  - Total: 75
- Time zone: UTC-6 (Central (CST))
  - Summer (DST): UTC-5 (CDT)
- GNIS feature ID: 2805627

Bowman is an unincorporated community and census-designated place (CDP) in Craighead County, Arkansas, United States. It was first listed as a CDP in the 2020 census with a population of 75.

== Demographics ==
Historical population
Census	Pop.	Note	%±
2020	75		—
U.S. Decennial Census; 2020

=== 2020 census ===
Bowman CDP, Arkansas – Racial and ethnic composition Note: the U.S. census treats Hispanic/Latino as an ethnic category. This table excludes Latinos from the racial categories and assigns them to a separate category. Hispanics/Latinos may be of any race.
Race / Ethnicity (NH = Non-Hispanic)	Pop 2020	% 2020
White alone (NH)	0	0.00%
Black or African American alone (NH)	75	100.00%
Native American or Alaska Native alone (NH)	0	0.00%
Asian alone (NH)	0	0.00%
Pacific Islander alone (NH)	0	0.00%
Some Other Race alone (NH)	0	0.00%
Mixed Race or Multi-Racial (NH)	0	0.00%
Hispanic or Latino (any race)	0	0.00%
Total	75	100.00%

== April 27, 2011 tornado ==
At 3:08 p.m. CDT on April 27, 2011, a tornado hit Bowman as part of the 2011 Super Outbreak. The tornado was rated EF1 with winds at 90 mph (140 km/h), a width of 250 yards (230 m), that traveled a path of 1.6 miles (2.6 km). The tornado caused roof damage to five homes and a business garage, and destroyed a storage shed.
