= Lake City, Arkansas =

- City
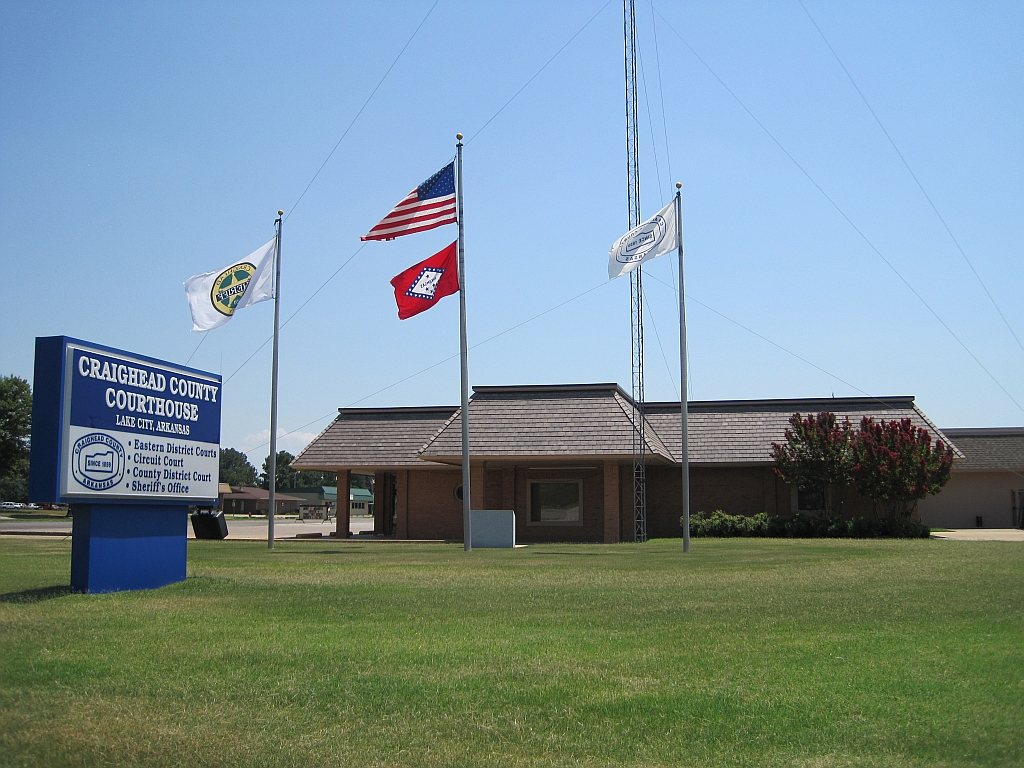
- Craighead County Courthouse, Eastern District in Lake City

- Location of Lake City in Craighead County, Arkansas.
- Coordinates: 35°49′13″N 90°27′17″W
- Country: United States
- State: Arkansas
- County: Craighead
- Established: 1898

Area
  - Total: 3.18 sq mi (8.24 km^{2})
  - Land: 3.15 sq mi (8.17 km^{2})
  - Water: 0.031 sq mi (0.08 km^{2})
- Elevation: 233 ft (71 m)

Population (2020)
  - Total: 2,326
  - Estimate (2025): 2,796 ▲
  - Density: 737.7/sq mi (284.83/km^{2})
- Time zone: UTC−06:00 (Central (CST))
  - Summer (DST): UTC−05:00 (CDT)
- ZIP Code: 72437
- Area code: 870
- FIPS code: 05-37780
- GNIS feature ID: 2404860
- Website: https://lakecityar.com/

Lake City is a city in Craighead County, Arkansas, United States, along the St. Francis River. Lake City is one of two county seats in Craighead County. The population was 2,326 as of the 2020 census. It is included in the Jonesboro, Arkansas Metropolitan Statistical Area.

== History ==
On April 2, 2025, a large EF3 tornado hit the western part of the city, destroying or inflicting severe damage to several homes. This area had previously been struck by an EF4 tornado that passed just northwest of the city on December 10, 2021.

== Geography ==
Lake City is located in eastern Craighead County at 35°49′4″N 90°26′24″W (35.817866, -90.439927), along the west bank of the St. Francis River. It is 16 miles (26 km) east of downtown Jonesboro.

According to the United States Census Bureau, the town has a total area of 3.1 square miles (7.9 km^{2}), of which 3.0 square miles (7.8 km^{2}) is land and 0.04 square miles (0.1 km^{2}), or 1.35%, is water.

=== List of highways ===
- U.S. Highway 78
- Highway 18
- Highway 135
- Highway 158

== Notable facts and former residents ==
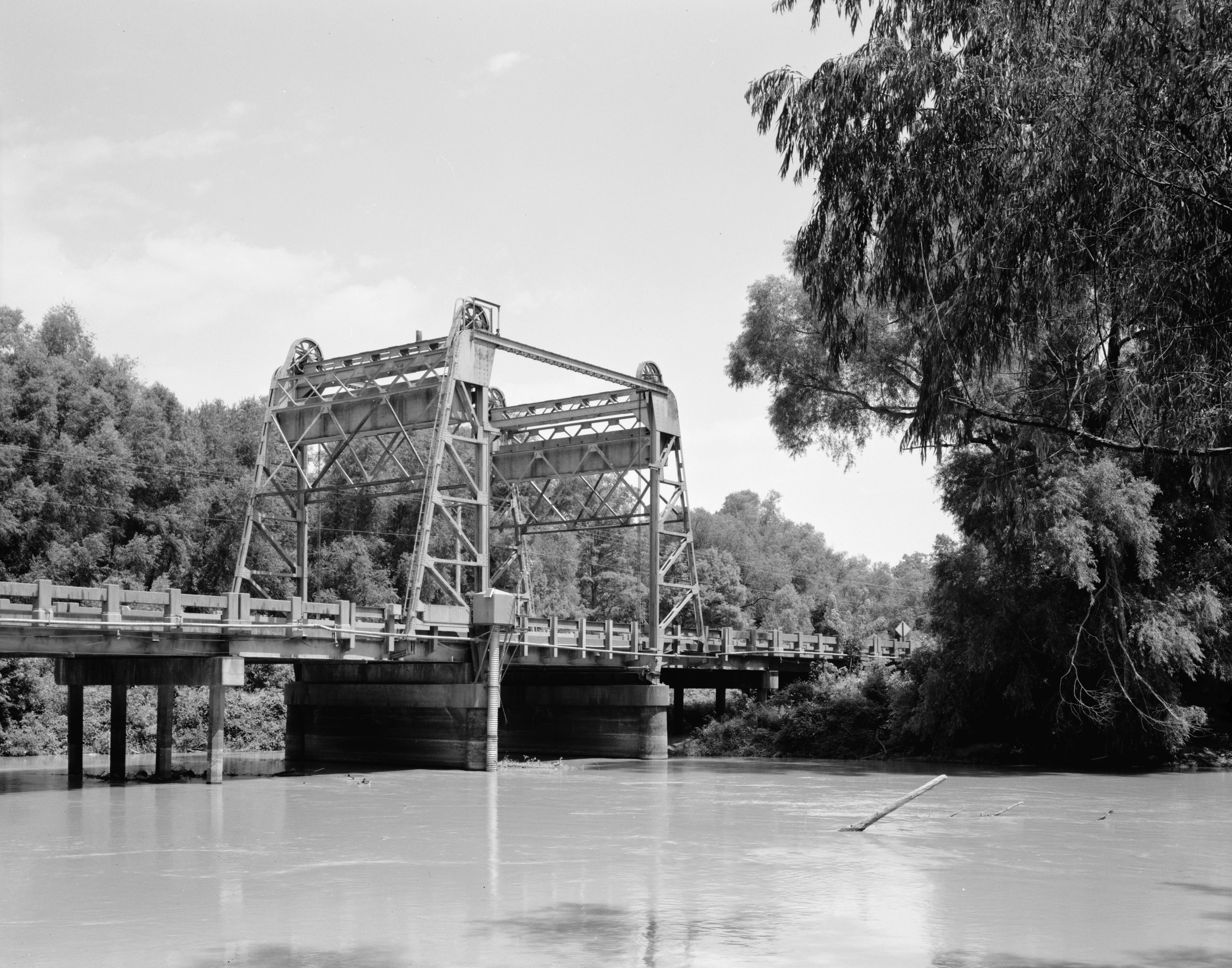
The St. Francis River Bridge in Lake City is listed on the National Register of Historic Places.

The St. Francis River Bridge located in Lake City is the only lift bridge in the world that has been raised only once since its construction. To construct a four-lane highway, a new bridge was constructed in 2002 and the lift bridge was moved to a location just south of the new bridge where it remains as a landmark.

Bart Barber, 64th President of the Southern Baptist Convention, was born and raised in Lake City.

Gavin Stone, professional baseball pitcher for the Los Angeles Dodgers of Major League Baseball (MLB/2023-), was born and attended Riverside High School in Lake City.

== Demographics ==
Historical population
| Census | Pop. | Note | %± |
|---|---|---|---|
| 1900 | 434 | | — |
| 1910 | 448 | | 3.2% |
| 1920 | 635 | | 41.7% |
| 1930 | 760 | | 19.7% |
| 1940 | 786 | | 3.4% |
| 1950 | 783 | | −0.4% |
| 1960 | 850 | | 8.6% |
| 1970 | 948 | | 11.5% |
| 1980 | 1,842 | | 94.3% |
| 1990 | 1,833 | | −0.5% |
| 2000 | 1,956 | | 6.7% |
| 2010 | 2,082 | | 6.4% |
| 2020 | 2,326 | | 11.7% |
| 2025 (est.) | 2,796 | ▲ | 20.2% |
U.S. Decennial Census

=== 2020 census ===
As of the 2020 census, Lake City had a population of 2,326. The median age was 35.1 years. 24.8% of residents were under the age of 18 and 16.9% were 65 years of age or older. For every 100 females, there were 97.0 males, and for every 100 females age 18 and over, there were 91.9 males age 18 and over.

There were 883 households in Lake City, of which 37.0% had children under the age of 18 living in them. Of all households, 49.9% were married-couple households, 16.6% were households with a male householder and no spouse or partner present, and 25.6% were households with a female householder and no spouse or partner present. About 26.3% of all households were made up of individuals and 10.1% had someone living alone who was 65 years of age or older.

There were 939 housing units, of which 6.0% were vacant. The homeowner vacancy rate was 2.0% and the rental vacancy rate was 5.6%.

0.0% of residents lived in urban areas, while 100.0% lived in rural areas.

Lake City racial composition
| Race | Number | Percentage |
|---|---|---|
| White (non-Hispanic) | 2,112 | 90.8% |
| Black or African American (non-Hispanic) | 42 | 1.81% |
| Native American | 13 | 0.56% |
| Asian | 5 | 0.21% |
| Pacific Islander | 1 | 0.04% |
| Other/Mixed | 92 | 3.96% |
| Hispanic or Latino | 61 | 2.62% |

=== 2000 census ===
As of the census of 2000, there were 1,956 people, 731 households, and 546 families residing in the town. The population density was 881.9 inhabitants per square mile (340.5/km^{2}). There were 776 housing units at an average density of 349.9 per square mile (135.1/km^{2}). The racial makeup of the town was 98.67% White, 0.05% Black or African American, 0.36% Native American, 0.05% Asian, 0.26% from other races, and 0.61% from two or more races. 1.02% of the population were Hispanic or Latino of any race.

There were 731 households, out of which 37.3% had children under the age of 18 living with them, 55.8% were married couples living together, 15.2% had a female householder with no husband present, and 25.3% were non-families. 23.0% of all households were made up of individuals, and 12.3% had someone living alone who was 65 years of age or older. The average household size was 2.57 and the average family size was 3.00.

In the town, the population was spread out, with 27.0% under the age of 18, 8.4% from 18 to 24, 27.8% from 25 to 44, 20.7% from 45 to 64, and 16.1% who were 65 years of age or older. The median age was 35 years. For every 100 females, there were 94.4 males. For every 100 females age 18 and over, there were 84.4 males.

The median income for a household in the town was $30,844, and the median income for a family was $33,477. Males had a median income of $27,798 versus $19,205 for females. The per capita income for the town was $14,126. About 11.4% of families and 14.6% of the population were below the poverty line, including 21.1% of those under age 18 and 9.1% of those age 65 or over.

== Education ==
Lake City is part of the Riverside School District, formed as a result of consolidation with the Lake City School District with that of nearby Caraway on July 1, 1985. The Riverside High School mascot and athletic teams are known as "the Rebels". There are two elementary schools associated with the school: one is located in Lake City and the other in Caraway.
