= Brookland, Arkansas =

- City
- Seal

- Location of Brookland in Craighead County, Arkansas.
- Coordinates: 35°53′12″N 90°35′30″W
- Country: United States
- State: Arkansas
- County: Craighead

Area
  - Total: 7.82 sq mi (20.25 km^{2})
  - Land: 7.80 sq mi (20.20 km^{2})
  - Water: 0.015 sq mi (0.04 km^{2})
- Elevation: 259 ft (79 m)

Population (2020)
  - Total: 4,064
  - Estimate (2025): 4,697 ▲
  - Density: 521.1/sq mi (201.18/km^{2})
- Time zone: UTC-6 (Central (CST))
  - Summer (DST): UTC-5 (CDT)
- ZIP code: 72417
- Area code: 870
- FIPS code: 05-09100
- GNIS feature ID: 2405329
- Website: cityofbrookland.com

Brookland is a city in Craighead County, Arkansas, United States. The population was 4,064 at the 2020 census. (Estimated population as of 2026 is 4,854). It is included in the Jonesboro, Arkansas Metropolitan Statistical Area.

== Geography ==
Brookland is located in northern Craighead County. Via U.S. Route 49 it is 8 miles (13 km) northeast of downtown Jonesboro. Paragould is 12 miles (19 km) north via US 49.

According to the United States Census Bureau, the city has a total area of 2.0 square miles (5.3 km^{2}), of which 0.008 square miles (0.02 km^{2}), or 0.33%, is water.

=== List of highways ===
- US 49
- Highway 1
- Highway 230

== Demographics ==
Historical population
Census	Pop.	Note	%±
1920	326		—
1930	270		−17.2%
1940	276		2.2%
1950	334		21.0%
1960	301		−9.9%
1970	465		54.5%
1980	840		80.6%
1990	919		9.4%
2000	1,332		44.9%
2010	1,642		23.3%
2020	4,064		147.5%
2025 (est.)	4,697	▲	15.6%
U.S. Decennial Census

=== 2020 census ===
As of the 2020 census, Brookland had a population of 4,064. The median age was 28.3 years. 29.7% of residents were under the age of 18 and 7.7% of residents were 65 years of age or older. For every 100 females there were 88.8 males, and for every 100 females age 18 and over there were 86.8 males age 18 and over.

0.0% of residents lived in urban areas, while 100.0% lived in rural areas.

There were 1,598 households in Brookland, including 945 families. Of all households, 41.5% had children under the age of 18 living in them, 43.6% were married-couple households, 17.3% were households with a male householder and no spouse or partner present, and 30.5% were households with a female householder and no spouse or partner present. About 27.4% of all households were made up of individuals and 6.3% had someone living alone who was 65 years of age or older.

There were 1,693 housing units, of which 5.6% were vacant. The homeowner vacancy rate was 3.0% and the rental vacancy rate was 4.3%.

Brookland racial composition
Race	Number	Percentage
White (non-Hispanic)	3,553	87.43%
Black or African American (non-Hispanic)	175	4.31%
Native American	14	0.34%
Asian	10	0.25%
Pacific Islander	1	0.02%
Other/Mixed	177	4.36%
Hispanic or Latino	134	3.3%

=== 2000 census ===
As of the census of 2000, there were 1,332 people, 499 households, and 384 families residing in the town. The population density was 1,220.1 inhabitants per square mile (471.1/km^{2}). There were 537 housing units at an average density of 491.9 per square mile (189.9/km^{2}). The racial makeup of the town was 97.52% White, 0.68% Black or African American, 0.38% Native American, 0.68% from other races, and 0.75% from two or more races. 1.05% of the population were Hispanic or Latino of any race.

There were 499 households, out of which 43.7% had children under the age of 18 living with them, 59.3% were married couples living together, 14.4% had a female householder with no husband present, and 23.0% were non-families. 19.6% of all households were made up of individuals, and 11.0% had someone living alone who was 65 years of age or older. The average household size was 2.67 and the average family size was 3.07.

In the town the population was spread out, with 29.7% under the age of 18, 9.2% from 18 to 24, 31.8% from 25 to 44, 17.6% from 45 to 64, and 11.6% who were 65 years of age or older. The median age was 31 years. For every 100 females, there were 95.0 males. For every 100 females age 18 and over, there were 87.2 males.

The median income for a household in the town was $33,125, and the median income for a family was $37,500. Males had a median income of $27,471 versus $18,864 for females. The per capita income for the town was $13,744. About 7.0% of families and 11.1% of the population were below the poverty line, including 17.4% of those under age 18 and 18.7% of those age 65 or over.

== Education ==
It is in the Brookland School District, which operates Brookland High School.
