= Egypt, Arkansas =

- Town
- Location of Egypt in Craighead County, Arkansas
- Coordinates: 35°52′18″N 90°56′42″W
- Country: United States
- State: Arkansas
- County: Craighead
- Established: 1898

Area
  - Total: 0.34 sq mi (0.87 km^{2})
  - Land: 0.34 sq mi (0.87 km^{2})
  - Water: 0 sq mi (0.00 km^{2})
- Elevation: 249 ft (76 m)

Population (2020)
  - Total: 113
  - Estimate (2025): 108 ▼
  - Density: 335.9/sq mi (129.71/km^{2})
- Time zone: UTC-6 (Central (CST))
  - Summer (DST): UTC-5 (CDT)
- ZIP code: 72427
- Area code: 870
- FIPS code: 05-20920
- GNIS feature ID: 2406428

Egypt is a town in Craighead County, Arkansas, United States. The population was 113 at the 2020 census. It is included in the Jonesboro, Arkansas Metropolitan Statistical Area.

== History ==
Egypt, Arkansas is a small town located in Craighead County near the Cache River. The town was established in 1898 by New York businessmen attracted to the area's abundant timber. The narrow gauge railway by the Sedgwick Tie and Timber Company connected the town to the major line of the Kansas City, Fort Scott and Memphis Railroad, which stimulated its growth. The town was home to several stores, a gin, a school, and churches in the 1930s and 1950s, but never experienced major growth due to its location far from the main railway line and major highways. In 1942 an oil pipeline pumping station was built near Bald Knob, Ar. to move oil northeast along the Big Inch oil pipeline. The town's decline started after the cutting of timber and the consolidation of schools. It was incorporated as a town in 1984 and had a population of 113 in the 2020 census.

== Geography ==
Egypt is located in western Craighead County and was named after Victoria Eyshept. Eyshept was a Welsh noblewoman who was one of the first settlers: due to her thick accent, Americans assumed she was saying "Egypt", and the name stuck.

According to the United States Census Bureau, the town has a total area of 0.35 square miles (0.9 km^{2}), all of which is land.

Only one highway runs through the small community, Arkansas Highway 91, which intersects Craighead County Road 192 at the center of the town.

== Demographics ==
Historical population
Census	Pop.	Note	%±
1990	123		—
2000	101		−17.9%
2010	112		10.9%
2020	113		0.9%
2025 (est.)	108	▼	−4.4%
U.S. Decennial Census

As of the census of 2000, there were 101 people, 43 households, and 28 families residing in the town. The population density was 274.5 inhabitants per square mile (106.0/km^{2}). There were 51 housing units at an average density of 138.6 per square mile (53.5/km^{2}). The racial makeup of the town was 97.03% White, and 2.97% from two or more races. 0.99% of the population were Hispanic or Latino of any race.

There were 43 households, out of which 23.3% had children under the age of 18 living with them, 48.8% were married couples living together, 16.3% had a female householder with no husband present, and 32.6% were non-families. 30.2% of all households were made up of individuals, and 20.9% had someone living alone who was 65 years of age or older. The average household size was 2.35 and the average family size was 2.90.

In the town, the population was spread out, with 24.8% under the age of 18, 7.9% from 18 to 24, 19.8% from 25 to 44, 19.8% from 45 to 64, and 27.7% who were 65 years of age or older. The median age was 43 years. For every 100 females, there were 71.2 males. For every 100 females age 18 and over, there were 76.7 males.

The median income for a household in the town was $18,750, and the median income for a family was $24,063. Males had a median income of $19,583 versus $16,250 for females. The per capita income for the town was $9,828. There were 22.6% of families and 29.9% of the population living below the poverty line, including 55.6% of under eighteens and 13.8% of those over 64.

== Education ==
Egypt residents are served by the Westside Consolidated School District. The district opened in 1966 after the Egypt school district merged into it. Its high school is Westside High School in Jonesboro.
