= Valley View High School (Arkansas) =

Location
- 2118 Valley View Drive, AR 72404, US; Jonesboro, Craighead County, Arkansas 72404; United States; 35°46′40″N 90°44′13″W

Information
- Motto: Excellence In Education For All
- Established: 1925 (101 years ago)
- Status: Open
- School district: Valley View School District
- NCES District ID: 0513380
- Superintendent: Roland Popejoy
- CEEB code: 041272
- NCES School ID: 051338001095
- Principal: Crystal Cline
- Teaching staff: 46.20 (on FTE basis)
- Grades: 10–12
- Enrollment: 673 (2023-2024)
- Student to teacher ratio: 14.57
- Campus type: Suburban
- Colors: Blue and gold
- Athletics: Basketball (boys/girls), bowling, cheerleading, dance, football, soccer (boys/girls), swimming (boys/girls), tennis (boys/girls), and track and field (boys/girls)
- Athletics conference: 5A East
- Mascot: Blazer
- Team name: Valley View Blazers/Lady Blazers
- Accreditation: AdvancED
- Newspaper: The Beacon
- Communities served: Valley View community, Jonesboro, AR
- Affiliation: Arkansas Activities Association
- Website: www.valleyviewschools.net/o/vhhs

Valley View High School is comprehensive public high school for students in grades 10 through 12 located in southwestern area of Jonesboro, Arkansas, United States. Established in 1925, the northeastern Arkansas school is administered by the Valley View School District and is accredited by AdvancED and the Arkansas Department of Education (ADE).

== Academics ==
=== Curriculum ===
The assumed course of study is the ADE Smart Core curriculum with students completing regular (core and career focus) courses and exams and may select Advanced Placement (AP) coursework and exams that offer an opportunity to receive college credit prior to graduation. Exceptional students are eligible to participate in Arkansas Governor's School and receive recognition in the National Merit Scholarship Program.

=== Awards and recognition ===
In 2010, educator Michelle Moss received the Inspirational Educator Award sponsored by the Educational Theatre Association.

In 2012, student Christian D. Williams was honored as a Scholar of the Presidential Scholars Program.

== Athletics ==
The Valley View mascot and athletic emblem is the Blazer with blue and gold serving as the school colors.

The Valley View Blazers compete in numerous interscholastic competitions in the 5A East Conference administered by the Arkansas Activities Association including basketball (boys/girls), bowling, cheerleading, dance, debate, soccer (boys/girls), swimming (boys/girls), tennis (boys/girls), and track and field (boys/girls). The 5A East Conference consists of Batesville, Blytheville, Forrest City, Greene County Tech, Nettleton, Paragould, Valley View, and Wynne.

Former Blazer student-athlete Casey Woodruff (1997–2001) holds the Arkansas record (girls) for the most All-State awards with eight (tennis 4, golf 4).

- Tennis - The 1997 VVHS Mens Tennis team won state. Caleb Cheiser and Morton Simon took all around state championship.
- Football - The VVHS football program was started in 2004 with the first Friday night football games coming in 2007.
- Volleyball - The VVHS volleyball team, led by coach Margie Magee, won 9 of 10 state championships between 2003 and 2013.
- Golf - The girls’ golf team won its first state championship in 2012.
- Bowling - The girls’ bowling team won state championships in 2006, 2007, 2008, and the boys team won the state title in 2006 and 2021.
- Dance - The competitive dance team won state championships 2008, 2009, and 2010.
- Baseball - The baseball team won state championships in 2008, 2009, 2021, 2024, 2025, and 2026.
- Soccer - The boys’ soccer team won state championships in 2013, 2019, and 2021, and the girls’ team won a state championship in 2014.

== Notable alumni ==
- Slade Caldwell, baseball player
