= Thomas Craighead (politician) =

American politician

- Born: 1798
- Died: 1862 (aged 63–64)
- Occupations: Politician, lawyer

Thomas B. Craighead (1798–1862) was an American politician and lawyer from the state of Arkansas. He served in the Arkansas State Senate representing Crittenden and Mississippi Counties.

== Early life ==
Craighead was born 1798 to the Reverend Thomas Craighead and his wife Elizabeth.

== Craighead County ==
In 1859, Senator William A. Jones, who represented St. Francis and Poinsett Counties, introduced a bill to create a new county. This county would be created from portions of Poinsett, Greene, and Mississippi Counties. Craighead opposed the bill because it would remove a large section of fertile farmland from Mississippi County, and the tax revenue derived from it. Jones waited until Craighead was absent from the chamber to push for final passage of his bill. Unknown to Craighead, Jones amended the bill to name the new county Craighead County, possibly as a gesture of goodwill. In return, the new county seat was named Jonesboro.
