= Payneway, Arkansas =

- Census-designated place
- Payneway's position in Arkansas. Payneway, Arkansas (the United States)
- Coordinates: 35°32′50″N 90°30′10″W
- Country: United States
- State: Arkansas
- County: Poinsett
- Township: Little River
- Elevation: 213 ft (65 m)

Population (2020)
  - Total: 241
- Time zone: UTC-6 (Central (CST))
  - Summer (DST): UTC-5 (CDT)
- Area code: 870
- GNIS feature ID: 2805674

Payneway (formerly Harrisburg Corner) is an unincorporated community and census-designated place (CDP) in Little River Township, Poinsett County, Arkansas, United States. It is located west of Marked Tree near the intersection of Arkansas Highway 463 (formerly U.S. Route 63) and Arkansas Highway 14. It was first listed as a CDP in the 2020 census with a population of 241.

== Demographics ==
Historical population
| Census | Pop. | Note | %± |
|---|---|---|---|
| 2020 | 241 | | — |
U.S. Decennial Census; 2020

=== 2020 census ===
Payneway CDP, Arkansas – Demographic Profile (NH = Non-Hispanic) Note: the US Census treats Hispanic/Latino as an ethnic category. This table excludes Latinos from the racial categories and assigns them to a separate category. Hispanics/Latinos may be of any race.
| Race / Ethnicity | Pop 2020 | % 2020 |
|---|---|---|
| White alone (NH) | 216 | 89.63% |
| Black or African American alone (NH) | 5 | 2.07% |
| Native American or Alaska Native alone (NH) | 0 | 0.00% |
| Asian alone (NH) | 0 | 0.00% |
| Pacific Islander alone (NH) | 0 | 0.00% |
| Some Other Race alone (NH) | 0 | 0.00% |
| Mixed Race/Multi-Racial (NH) | 10 | 4.15% |
| Hispanic or Latino (any race) | 10 | 4.15% |
| Total | 241 | 100.00% |
