= Roy Penix =

American politician (1891–1978)

Mayor of Jonesboro, Arkansas
- In office 1947–1949
- Preceded by: Herbert J. Bosler
- Succeeded by: Herbert J. Bosler

Personal details
- Born: September 3, 1891 Bono, Arkansas, U.S.
- Died: January 3, 1978 (aged 86) Jonesboro, Arkansas, U.S.
- Relatives: Marian Penix (daughter-in-law)
- Education: University of Arkansas (BA, LL.B.); George Washington University
- Occupation: Lawyer; politician

Military service
- Allegiance: United States
- Branch/service: Army Air Service
- Battles/wars: World War I

William Roy Penix Jr. (September 2, 1891 – January 3, 1978) was an American lawyer and Democratic politician who served as the mayor of Jonesboro, Arkansas, from 1947 to 1949. He also served in the Arkansas House of Representatives in the 1920s.

== Early life and education ==
William Roy Penix Jr. was born on September 2, 1891, in Bono, Arkansas. His father, W. R. Penix operated a mercantile shop, having fallen into poverty due to the American Civil War.

Penix attended the University of Arkansas, where he received his Bachelor of Arts in 1912, before attending George Washington University law school, and finally the Arkansas Law School, where he earned a Bachelor of Laws in 1915.

== Career and military service ==
In 1916, Penix entered into a law partnership with Gordon Frierson. On August 18, 1918, Penix enlisted in the U.S. Army, serving in the Army Air Service during World War I. At the end of the war, he attended a conference in St. Louis where the idea of the American Legion was conceived. As a member of the organization, he sat on the Publishing Committee.

In 1921, Frierson was elected mayor of Jonesboro. On April 4 of the following year, Penix was elected the city attorney of Jonesboro. In the 1920s, he sat in the Arkansas House of Representatives. While in office, Penix fought anti-evolution legislation, which, according to his son, "cost him his office the next time." His son described Penix as "the town liberal."

Penix served as the mayor of Jonesboro, Arkansas, from 1947 to 1949. During his tenure, Penix tackled the city's road problems, installing traffic lights, parking meters and a sanitation service.

In 1952, Penix was a delegate representing Arkansas at the 1952 Democratic National Convention.

Penix and his son were instrumental in desegregation during the 1955 Hoxie School District integration crisis. According to historian Elizabeth Jacoway, Roy Penix wrote to United States Attorney General Herbert Brownell Jr. that a movement based in Mississippi was working to intimidate the school board into maintaining the segregated status quo.

In 1958, Penix helped Jonesboro annex Nettleton, a suburb of the city.

== Personal life and death ==
The Penix family was prominent in the law scene of Arkansas. Penix's son, Bill Penix, was in a partnership with his father (Penix, Penix & Lusby), and Bill's wife, Marian Penix, was the sole female appointed to the Arkansas Court of Appeals upon its creation in 1979 by Governor Bill Clinton.

Penix died on January 3, 1978, at age 86, in Jonesboro.
