= Jonesboro High School (Arkansas) =

Location
- 301 Hurricane Drive; Jonesboro, Arkansas 72401-4977; United States; 35°49′25″N 90°42′19″W

Information
- Other name: The Academies at Jonesboro High School
- Type: Public high school
- Founded: 1899 (127 years ago)
- School district: Jonesboro Public Schools
- CEEB code: 041270
- Principal: Brad Faught
- Teaching staff: 97.64 (FTE)
- Grades: 10–12
- Enrollment: 1,423 (2023–2024)
- Student to teacher ratio: 14.57
- Campus type: Urban
- Colors: Black, gold, white, and red
- Athletics conference: 7A/6A East (2012-14)
- Mascot: Golden Hurricane
- Rivals: West Memphis High School; Nettleton High School; Greene County Tech High School
- Accreditation: North Central Association (NCA) Commission on Accreditation and School Improvement (CASI)
- Feeder schools: Annie Camp Junior High School; Douglas MacArthur Junior High School
- Website: jhs.jonesboroschools.net

Jonesboro High School is a public high school for students in grades 10 through 12 located in Jonesboro, Arkansas, United States. It is one of eight public high schools in Craighead County, and is the sole high school of the Jonesboro Public Schools.

== Academics ==
Jonesboro High School was founded in 1899 and is accredited by the Arkansas Department of Education (ADE). Since 1924, Jonesboro High School has been a charter member accredited by AdvancED (formerly the North Central Association (NCA) Commission on Accreditation and School Improvement (CASI).

The assumed course of study follows the ADE Smart Core curriculum, which requires students complete at least 22 units prior to graduation. Students complete regular (core and career focus) courses and exams and may select Advanced Placement (AP) coursework and exams that provide an opportunity to receive college credit prior to high school graduation.

As of 2011–12, JHS offers the following AP courses: Art History, Biology, Calculus AB, Chemistry, English Language and Composition, English Literature and Composition, Government & Politics, Spanish, Statistics, Studio Art, U.S. History, and World History. The school has been recognized by the Siemens Foundation for their AP program.

As of 2013, Jonesboro High School is referred to as "The Academies at Jonesboro High School". Academy-based JHS splits students into one of three academies: Science, Technology, Engineering and Mathematics (STEM), Health and Human Services (HHS) or Business, Communication Arts and Law (BCAL).

=== Awards and recognition ===
In 1982–1983, Jonesboro High School was recognized as a National Blue Ribbon School of Excellence by the U.S. Department of Education, one of only six high schools in the state ever to be awarded this honor.

JHS regularly has a high percentage of its students that attend post secondary institutions, with over 65 percent of the 2010 senior class receiving scholarships totaling over $7.8 million.

== Performing arts ==
JHS has a highly awarded performing arts program, with options such as choir, symphonic and marching band, acting, and visual and performing arts being available to students. Several levels of each program are available to students, and each program has continuously received various awards at competitions. The marching is a regular participant at various competitions, and regularly receives team and individual awards. The acting program regularly performs plays each semester, and has its regularly students participate in Forensics and Thespian tournaments, including the International Thespian Festival. A high percentage of its students receive individual awards and scholarships. In 2011 the JHS Thespian Troupe performed at the International Thespian Competition in Scotland.

== Band ==
JHS has a rich band program that extends to among the considerable programs in the state. The first band director, George Graves, was the founder and first band director of the Jonesboro Band. The current head band director is Brice Evans, with some of the previous band directors consisting of Grant Harbison, Steve Warner, George Graves, and many more. The Jonesboro Band hosts the Sonic Mid-South Marching Classic, a marching competition schools participate in. The Sonic Mid-South Marching Classic has been hosted by the Jonesboro Band for 19 consecutive years, as of 2024.

The Jonesboro Band consists of two bands: Concert and Symphonic Winds. The Concert Winds participates in concert assessment and consistently obtains superior ratings. On April 17, 2025, the Concert Winds, conducted by Trent Warner, partook in ASBOA's State Concert Assessment in DD-6A. It was their first appearance, and they received a 1st Division rating. Similarly, the Symphonic Winds also participates in concert assessment and also obtains superior ratings. The Symphonic Winds also participates in the ASBOA State Concert Assessment. They participated from 2022 to 2025, with each year receiving a 1st Division rating. From 2022 to 2024, the Symphonic Winds obtained a 1st Division rating and Reserve Honor Ensemble, 2nd in their classification. On April 15, 2025, the Symphonic Winds, under the conduction of Grant Harbison, was deemed champions in the 6A State Concert Assessment.

== Extracurricular activities ==
JHS offers a variety of clubs, such as foreign language clubs, honorary organizations (National Beta Club, Mu Alpha Theta, and National Honor Society), leadership oriented clubs (student council, Model UN, FCCLA, FBLA), sports clubs ("J" Club and FCA), drug prevention clubs (PRIDE Youth Program), and others that are sponsored by civic organizations whose general intent is philanthropic.

In 2011, students in the school's Family, Career and Community Leaders of America (FCCLA) program won 2nd place at the Family and Consumer Sciences Knowledge Bowl held at the 2011 FCCLA National Conference. In 2012, Jonesboro won 4th place at the National Conference. Family and Consumer Sciences Knowledge Bowl is a three-level, team competition that challenges students’ knowledge of all aspects of family and consumer sciences.

== Facilities ==
The current school building was designed by the Jonesboro firm Little and Associates. This replaced the original building destroyed by a tornado on May 27, 1973. They were not allowed to build a structure larger than two stories. They were also limited on the number of windows in the structure due to the laws on public school buildings in place at the time. This kept them from restoring the beautiful original colonial-style building.

After a special election, the district was awarded additional funding through a millage increase. Part of this increase will be used towards the construction of new facilities and upgrading of previous ones. JHS benefited from a complete overhaul of its current Don Riggs Hurricane Gym and a newly constructed Performing Arts Center intended to seat over 1000 people. Jonesboro High School's football field and track were also refurbished for the 2013 season.

== Athletics ==
The Jonesboro athletic teams are known as the Golden Hurricane or Hurricane. They play in the Arkansas High School Athletic Association, Class AAAAAA East Conference. The Athletic Director is Trey Harding.

=== Football ===
Jonesboro has won three Arkansas State Football Championships, most recently in 1979. The Hurricane last won a conference championship in 2011.

Head Football Coach Jim DeVazier resigned at the end of the 2007 season after a 25+ year stint. The Jonesboro Public School District chose Randy Coleman, former coach at cross-town school Valley View High School, to replace DeVazier.

In 2008 the Hurricane saw a resurgence of sorts in football, going (8-2) in the regular season, thus receiving a second round home game in the AA Playoffs. The Hurricane's traditional rivals are West Memphis High School and Greene County Tech High School, both near Jonesboro in Northeast Arkansas. In 1998 Jonesboro began a series with smaller cross-town rival Nettleton High School (4A) and leads the series 4-1. The "Crosstown Showdown" has since ceased. In 2010 a new rivalry was started with the Greene County Tech Golden Eagles known as the "Border Bowl" as the counties in which the schools are located (Craighead and Greene) border each other. Jonesboro currently leads the series 4-0.

=== Basketball ===
The Hurricane have been successful in basketball, winning a total of 10 Arkansas State Basketball Championships. Most recently, JHS defeated AA East Conference rival Forrest City for the 2007 title at the Hot Springs Convention Center. In 2006, the Hurricane lost to Little Rock Parkview High School in a rematch of the 1994 state finals game in which the Hurricane won. The main basketball rivals for the Hurricane are West Memphis High School and Nettleton High School. The Hurricane have won several conference championships, most recently in 2014 when the Hurricane won the AA East Conference Championship against rival Parkview.

=== Baseball ===
Compared to basketball and football, Jonesboro's baseball team is relatively new. The Hurricane first fielded a team in 1989 and made it to their first (and as of 2008 only) state championship game in 2005, played in Baum Stadium at the University of Arkansas. The Hurricane lost to former fellow AA East Conference member, Sylvan Hills High School. The Hurricane have won several AA East Conference Baseball Championships, most recently in 2012. The Hurricane's baseball rivals are Searcy High School and Nettleton High School. In 2013, Jonesboro beat Greenwood High School in the AA state championship to claim their first ever baseball state championship, led by two-time player of the year J.D. Rainwater. In the spring of 2016, Jonesboro High won their second 6A State Championship.

=== Track and field ===
Jonesboro High School's track and field teams have won multiple state and conference championships. Past record-breaking athletes and state champions have been Earl Bell (1973) in pole vault, Arkansas State University, Darrell Burris (1973) in 1600m, Arkansas State University, Steve Griffith (1973) in 800m, Arkansas State University, John Butler (1969) in long jump, Henderson State University; Gary Guthrie (1965) in decathlon, Alabama; Jed Jackson (1972) in shot put, Rhodes College; Sam Urton (1974) in hurdles, Arkansas State University; Terry Primm (1975) in pole vault, Arkansas State University; Gary Haag (1963) in hurdles, Arkansas State University; and Charles Reding (1969) in the mile, Arkansas-Monticello.

=== Tennis ===
Jonesboro High School's tennis team has won several state championships in recent years. Their most recent state championship was in 2011, when the girls defeated Searcy and the boys defeated Mountain Home. The head coach of the tennis team is Jason Morgan.

Volleyball, golf, soccer, wrestling, cross country, bowling, swimming, and softball have also been successful for the Hurricane, as those teams have had several playoff appearances as well as conference and state championships.

=== Volleyball ===
The girls' volleyball team won a state-high 12 state championships between 1978 and 2016, including three consecutive titles (1994, 1995, 1996). In 2002, the team had its most successful campaign, with a state-record 39 wins in a season.

== Notable alumni ==
- Earl Bell (1973) – Olympic bronze medalist 1976
- Zac Brooks (2012) – running back, Denver Broncos
- Scott Bull (1970) – quarterback, Arkansas/San Francisco 49ers
- Matt Cavenaugh (1996) – Broadway actor
- Harold Copenhaver (1979) – Mayor of Jonesboro and former Arkansas State representative
- John Dickson (1964) – former ABA basketball player
- Ferd Dreher – football player
- Donnie Keshawarz (1987) – TV actor and Broadway actor
- Chuck Latourette (1962) – defensive back, Rice University/Cardinals
- Kyle Dean Massey (2000) – Broadway actor
- Charley Thornton (1954) – college athletics administrator
- Debbye Turner (1983) – Miss America 1990
