= 2024 Jonesboro mayoral election =

- November 5, 2024

Candidate	Harold Copenhaver	LJ Bryant
Party	Democratic	Democratic
Popular vote	10,982	8,381
Percentage	45.44%	34.14%
Candidate	Jeremy Terrell	Thomas Elwood
Party		Republican
Popular vote	3,784	909
Percentage	15.79%	3.79%
Mayor before election
Harold Copenhaver
Elected mayor
Harold Copenhaver

The 2024 Jonesboro mayoral election was held on November 5, 2024, to elect the next mayor of Jonesboro, Arkansas. The election was nonpartisan, meaning the candidates' party affiliations did not appear on the ballot. Incumbent Harold Copenhaver defeated LJ Bryant in a runoff election on December 3, 2024.

== Candidates ==
=== Declared ===
- LJ Bryant, city councilor and businessman
- Harold Copenhaver, the incumbent mayor of Jonesboro since 2020
- Thomas Elwood, candidate in the 2020 mayoral election
- Jeremy Terrell, former Jonesboro School District board member

== Campaigns ==
Bryant raised the highest amount of campaign donations, at $277,705 by October 29; Copenhaver raised $187,300. Bryant also outspent the other candidates, reporting having spent $255,046.27; Copenhaver spent $176,568.86. Jeremy Terrell reported $15,067.29 in contributions to his campaign, of that spending $13,368.05. Thomas Elwood did not file such a report.

Bryant's campaign centered on his "ten-point plan", which listed ten priorities for the city of Jonesboro to focus on. Terrell's campaign focused on strengthening law enforcement and countering crime, while Elwood stressed the importance of government transparency.

Due to a 2011 hot check conviction, Terrell is ineligible to hold elected office in Arkansas.

=== Endorsements ===
LJ Bryant
- Jeremy Terrell, following Terrell's loss in the general election
Harold Copenhaver
- Thomas Elwood, following Elwood's loss in the general election
- Doug Formon, mayor of Jonesboro from 2004 to 2008
- Jonesboro Firefighters Local 3718
Jeremy Terrell
- Craighead County Republican Committee

== Results ==
On November 5, a runoff election was declared because no candidate received a majority of the popular vote. Bryant and Copenhaver were listed on the ballot for the runoff election, while Terrell and Elwood did not continue past the general election.

Voting and election results
Candidate	General election		Runoff	
LJ Bryant	8,381	34.14%	3,446	39.56%
Harold Copenhaver	10,892	45.44%	5,264	60.44%
Thomas Elwood	909	3.79%	Defeated in general election	
Jeremy Terrell	3,784	15.79%	Defeated in general election	
Total votes	23,966	100%	8,710	100%

== See also ==
- 2024 Arkansas elections
