= Marian Penix =

American judge (1924–1991)

Judge on the Arkansas Court of Appeals
- In office 1979–unknown
- Appointed by: Bill Clinton

Personal details
- Born: Alice Marian Fox; April 28, 1924 Tulsa, Oklahoma, U.S.
- Died: September 21, 1991 (aged 67)
- Party: Democratic
- Spouse: Bill Penix (m. c. 1944)
- Relatives: Roy Penix (father-in-law)
- Education: University of Arkansas (bachelor's); William H. Bowen School of Law (JD)

Alice Marian Penix (April 28, 1924 – September 21, 1991; née Fox) was an American magistrate who was the sole woman appointed to the Arkansas Court of Appeals upon its creation in 1979 by Governor Bill Clinton.

== Biography ==
Alice Marian Fox was born on April 28, 1924 in Tulsa, Oklahoma, United States. She attended the University of Arkansas, where she earned a bachelor's degree in social work. In 1943 or 1944 she married Bill Penix, son of lawyer and politician Roy Penix. In 1949, she graduated from the William H. Bowen School of Law, after which she practiced law in Jonesboro, Arkansas; she attended studied law while her husband served in World War II. She practiced at the Penix Law Firm. With Penix she had four children.

Marian Penix was a delegate to the 1972 Democratic National Convention; around this time — unknown whether before, during or after — the Penixs met the Clinton family. In 1979, Governor Bill Clinton appointed Penix to the newly established Arkansas Court of Appeals.

She was a member of the First United Methodist Church in Jonesboro. She served as the president of the Jonesboro Junior Auxiliary and belonged to the Jonesboro Fine Arts Council.

Penix died on the morning of September 21, 1991, aged 67, due to cancer.
