= Michael John Gray =

American farmer, businessman, and politician

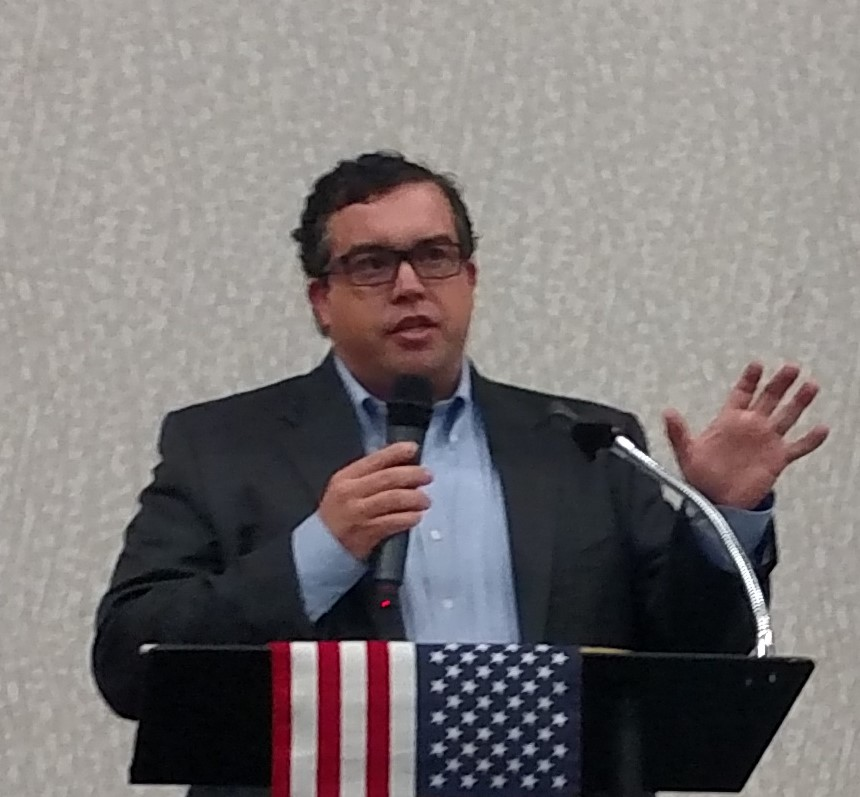

Chair of the Democratic Party of Arkansas
- In office March 26, 2017 – September 1, 2021
- Preceded by: Vince Insalaco
- Succeeded by: Grant Tennille

Member of the Arkansas House of Representatives from the 47th district
- In office January 12, 2015 – January 2019
- Preceded by: Jody Dickinson
- Succeeded by: Craig Christiansen

Personal details
- Born: June 30, 1976 (age 50) Blytheville, Arkansas U.S.
- Party: Independent
- Other political affiliations: Democratic (formerly)
- Children: 1
- Education: Arkansas State University Beebe; Arkansas State University (BA); University of Arkansas, Little; Rock (JD)
- Website: Official website

Michael John Gray (born June 30, 1976) is a small business owner and the Woodruff County Judge from Augusta, Arkansas. He represented a rural area of the Arkansas Delta in the Arkansas House of Representatives from 2015 to 2017. Gray served as chair of the Democratic Party of Arkansas from 2017 to 2021. He has been Woodruff County Judge since 2023.

== Early life ==
Gray largely grew up in the Augusta School District, but graduated from Searcy High School.

He earned an Associate in Arts from Arkansas State University Beebe. He briefly attended the University of Arkansas in Fayetteville and earned his Bachelor of Arts in marketing with an emphasis on logistics from Arkansas State University in Jonesboro. Gray later earned a Juris Doctor (J.D.) from the University of Arkansas at Little Rock William H. Bowen School of Law.

== Career ==
After graduation, Gray returned to Augusta to work on the family farm, known as Wakefield Partners, with his wife and mother. A third-generation family farm, the operation spans 5,000 acres (2,000 ha) of cotton, corn, peanuts, rice, and wheat. The group was named the 2014 Woodruff County Farm Family of the Year, an honor previously bestowed on his parents in 1984. Gray won election to the Augusta City Council in 2010, and focused on budgeting and reducing municipal spending. In October 2013, Gray announced his candidacy for the Arkansas House of Representatives District 47 seat held by term-limited Democrat Jody Dickinson. His campaign announcement described a focus on rural issues, and his community involvement and collaborative work on the city council. Gray was unopposed in the Democratic primary and the general election, and was seated as a member of the 90th Arkansas General Assembly. The House Democratic Caucus elected him Minority leader, Democrats held 35 of 100 seats in the House. He voted for Arkansas Works (Medicaid expansion in Arkansas) twice and was a vocal supporter of the measure.

In March 2017, Gray won election to the unpaid position of Chair of the Democratic Party of Arkansas. He replaced the retiring Vince Insalaco for the remainder of his four-year term, defeating Denise Garner by a 120–107 vote. Gray campaigned on a return of focus to economic and rural issues. He was re-elected to full term as Chair in 2018.

Gray was narrowly defeated in his November 2018 re-election bid for the House District 47 seat by Bald Knob businessman and retired state bureaucrat Craig Christiansen.

In 2022, Gray ran as an independent for Woodruff County Judge. He defeated Republican John Ball with 1,053 (50.72%) votes to Ball's 1,023 (49.28%), a difference of just 30 votes.

Arkansas House of Representatives
Preceded by Jody Dickinson	Member of the Arkansas House of Representatives for the 47th district 2015–2019	Succeeded by Craig Christiansen
Party political offices
Preceded by Vince Insalaco	Chair of the Arkansas Democratic Party; 2017–2022	Succeeded by Nicole Hart; Acting
