= Gordon Frierson =

American lawyer and politician (1872–1951)

Mayor of Jonesboro, Arkansas
- In office 1917–1921
- Preceded by: G. W. Turner
- Succeeded by: Herbert J. Bosler

Personal details
- Born: James Gordon Frierson Jr. November 18, 1872 Forrest City, Arkansas, U.S.
- Died: October 16, 1951 (aged 78) Little Rock, Arkansas, U.S.
- Spouses: Sadie Glover Hudson (m. 1902) Pearl Clardy (m. 1912; died 1934) Clara Belle McKinney (m. 1941)
- Parent: James Frierson (father)
- Relatives: Martin L. Clardy (father-in-law)
- Education: University of Arkansas (Bachelor of Laws)
- Occupation: Lawyer; politician

Military service
- Allegiance: United States
- Branch/service: U.S. Army
- Years of service: 1898
- Rank: Sergeant
- Battles/wars: Spanish–American War

James Gordon Frierson Jr. (November 18, 1872 – October 16, 1951), who went by Gordon Frierson, was an American lawyer and politician who served as the mayor of Jonesboro, Arkansas, from 1917 to 1921. He served in the U.S. Army, ranking as a sergeant in the Spanish–American War.

== Early life and education ==
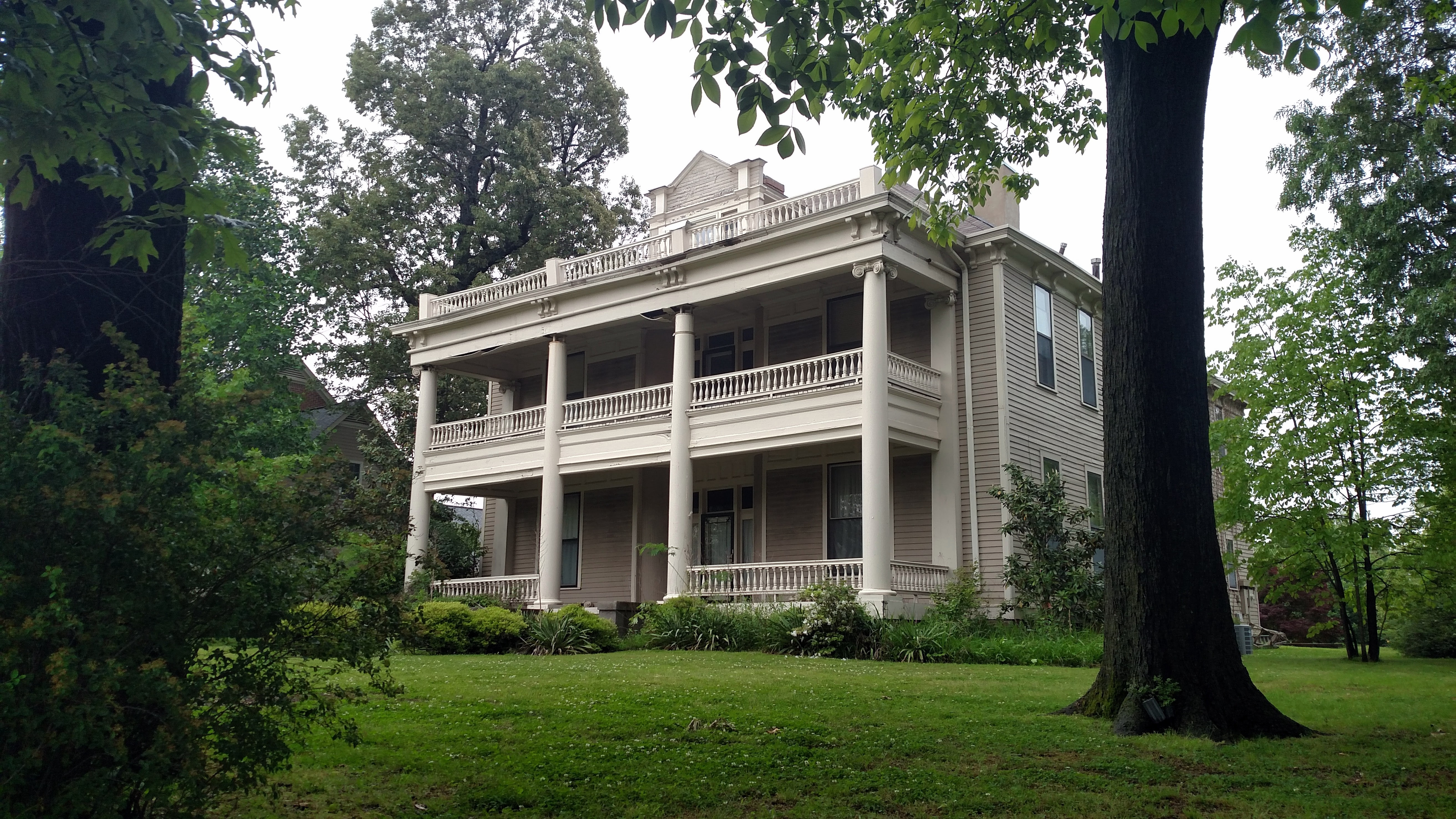
Frierson House, Jonesboro, where Gordon and his brother, sister-in-law and grandaunt lived

James Gordon Frierson Jr. was born on November 18, 1872, at his grandmother's house in Forrest City, Arkansas. He was the son of James Frierson, a Confederate soldier and member of the Arkansas House of Representatives and judge, and Emma Gwynne Davis; he had a twin sister, Camille.

Around 1878, the family moved to Marion, Arkansas; in 1883, they moved to Jonesboro, the largest city in the region, where they built the Frierson House. James was raised Presbyterian and passed his faith to his son.

While studying at university, he worked as the executive clerk to Governor William Meade Fishback from 1893 to 1894. In 1896, he graduated from the University of Arkansas at Little Rock, receiving his Bachelor of Laws degree.

== Law and politics ==
Around the time of receiving his Bachelor of Laws from the University of Arkansas at Little Rock, presumably afterward, in 1896, Frierson was admitted to the bar in the Circuit and Supreme courts of Arkansas. Moving back to Jonesboro after completing his education, he joined the call to arms to serve in the Spanish–American War.

In 1903 he was elected police judge of Jonesboro, and was reelected two years later. In 1905, he began working as the secretary to U.S. Senator James P. Clarke in Washington, D.C. He continued until he went to work at the Department of Civil Administration in Panama from July 1906 to September 1907. After his brief stint there, he moved to Memphis, Tennessee, practicing law from an office in the Tennessee Trust Building. In 1911, he returned to Jonesboro.

In 1917, Frierson, a Democrat, was elected mayor of Jonesboro. He was also the chief attorney for the Missouri Pacific Railroad during this time. He was reelected in 1919. During his mayoralty, Jonesboro saw the lynching of Wade Thomas, a Black man who killed the White police officer Aylmer Ragland on December 25, 1920. The next day, the town learned of the events, and citizens became deeply upset. Frierson and Jonesboro chief of police Gus Craig, in addition to two judges, stayed at the jail with Thomas. Craig and Frierson, "determined to protect Thomas," barricaded themselves in with him, both armed with shotguns; a crowd of about 500 broke through, took Thomas and hanged him.

He served four years, his second term ending in 1921, at which point he was succeeded by Herbert J. Bosler.

Beginning in 1934, he served as the chief deputy U.S. district attorney for the Eastern District of Arkansas; he had been recommended to rule by Senator Hattie Caraway. He worked from Little Rock. He retired on May 1, 1947, at age 74.

== Military service ==
Soon after the Spanish–American War began in April 1898, Frierson enlisted in the army. He became a colonel in May before a promotion to sergeant of the Company C of the Second Arkansas Volunteer Infantry. He was discharged in September, and moved to Memphis, Tennessee, to continue his career in law. The end of the war was declared in December.

== Personal life and death ==
In 1902, 30-year-old Frierson married 17-year-old Sadie Glover Hudson. He later married Pearl Eugenia Clardy, his first cousin, on March 14, 1912, at College Hill, near Oxford, Mississippi, his father's hometown. Clardy was the daughter of Martin L. Clardy, member of the U.S. House of Representatives from 1879 to 1889. Pearl died on Christmas Day 1934 from coronary occlusion.

On August 23, 1941, at age 64, Frierson married Clara Belle McKinney, 20 years his junior, in Pulaski County, Arkansas.

Raised in the church, Frierson was a lifelong Presbyterian. During his time in Jonesboro, he belonged to First Presbyterian Church. He was a member of the Ancient Order of United Workmen, the Benevolent and Protective Order of Elks, the fraternity Kappa Sigma and the Knights of Pythias.

Frierson died on October 16, 1951, at the VA Hospital in Little Rock from hypertensive heart disease, a complication of diabetes. He was buried in Oaklawn Cemetery in Jonesboro on October 18. His nephew-in-law, Governor Francis Cherry, among other relatives, served as a pallbearer.

== Bibliography ==
- Leister, Mrs. Presley E. Biographical and Historical Memoirs of Northeast Arkansas. Goodspeed Publishing Co. 1889.
- Who's Who in Tennessee. Paul & Douglass Co. 1911.
- Herndon, Dallas T. Centennial History of Arkansas. 1922.
- Bryan, John H. Where Neville Came From. 2018.
