= Jody Dickinson =

American politician

Member of the Arkansas House of Representatives from the 47th district
- In office January 14, 2013 – January 12, 2015
- Preceded by: Stephen Meeks
- Succeeded by: Michael John Gray

Member of the Arkansas House of Representatives from the 58th district
- In office January 2009 – January 14, 2013
- Preceded by: Tommy Dickinson
- Succeeded by: Harold Copenhaver

Personal details
- Party: Democratic
- Spouse: Tommy Dickinson
- Education: University of Arkansas at Monticello

Jody Dickinson is an American politician and a Democratic former member of the Arkansas House of Representatives representing District 47 from 2013 to 2015. Dickinson served consecutively from January 2009 until January 2013 in the District 58 seat, where she succeeded her husband, Representative Tommy Dickinson. Dickinson is registered to vote as a Republican.

== Education ==
Dickinson earned her bachelor's degree from the University of Arkansas at Monticello.

== Elections ==
- 2012 Redistricted to District 47, with Representative Stephen Meeks redistricted to District 67, Dickinson was challenged in the May 22, 2012 Democratic primary, which she won with 1,614 votes (57.1%), and was unopposed for the November 6, 2012 general election.
- 2008 Initially in District 58, when Tommy Dickinson left the Legislature and left the seat open, Dickinson placed first in the four-way May 20, 2008 Democratic Primary with 1,026 votes, won the June 10 runoff election with 1,432 votes (52.1%), and was unopposed for the November 4, 2008 General election.
- 2010 Dickinson was unopposed for the May 18, 2010 Democratic primary and the November 2, 2010 general election.
