= Joe Jeffers =

American evangelist, revivalist, and advocate of British Israelism

Joe Jeffers was an American evangelist, revivalist, and an advocate of British Israelism. He was at the center of the Church Wars in Jonesboro, Arkansas in the early 1930s. He later founded the Kingdom Temple and the Kingdom Temple Bible Institute in Los Angeles.

== Background ==
Jeffers was originally from Roanoke, Alabama. He was the sixth of fifteen children born to a Baptist family. He was recommended by a Baptist board of deacons as a ministerial student to Howard College (now Samford University) in Birmingham, Alabama. He later received a degree from Baylor University and was ordained at Southwestern Baptist Theological Seminary in Fort Worth, Texas.

== Jonesboro church wars ==
In 1930, Jeffers was at the center of a church controversy in Jonesboro, Arkansas that resulted in the National Guard placing the town under martial law. Beginning on June 29, 1930, Jeffers preached at a tent revival organized by Jonesboro Bible College and First Baptist Church in Jonesboro. Throughout the revival, Jeffers drew progressively larger crowds each night and the crusade was extended through the month of July. When the pastor of First Baptist Church resigned in August, the leadership of the church quickly offered the pastorate to Jeffers. This decision led to conflict within the congregation when some members opposed the decision and forced a vote, resulting in a reversed decision from leadership. The pastorate was instead given to Dow Heard. An angered Jeffers left town for a short time, but returned with the announcement that he was starting a standing revival meeting ministry in Jonesboro, pitching his tent less than a quarter mile from First Baptist.

Jeffers preached not only that the second coming would occur in 1932, but also that pastor Dow Heard and Mayor Herbert Bosler were involved in immorality. This led to a brawl between supporters of Heard and of Jeffers involving shovels, pitchforks, and firearms. After order was restored, a Jeffers supporter was arrested for starting the brawl. In the morning, Jeffers led a crowd of 500 supporters to the courthouse steps to pray that justice would come to Jonesboro and that God would purify the town from corrupt politicians and spiritual leaders. When asked to stand down by the mayor, Jeffers refused and exclaimed, "May God strike the mayor dead" as fighting again broke out. 75 ROTC soldiers from Jonesboro and Blytheville along with another 150 troops from the governor placed the town under martial law. After order was restored, and troops were withdrawn, the revival tent was burned on October 25, 1930. Jeffers responded by building Jonesboro Baptist Church.

== Los Angeles and the Kingdom of Yahweh ==
Jeffers broke with the Baptist denomination in 1935. He moved to Los Angeles in the late 1930s where he began revival meetings at the Embassy Auditorium. Soon after, he established the Kingdom Temple at 8th and Flower streets. Around this time, Jeffers also became active with William Dudley Pelley's Silver Legion.

In 1939, Jeffers and his second wife, Zella, were arrested on a morals charge, although they were eventually acquitted. Zella divorced him in 1943, at which time his first wife, Jessie Mayfield Eubanks, sued him for unpaid alimony and child support for his two children. In 1944, he was arrested for stealing a car belonging to one of his ex-wives, for which he served 15 months in prison. During this time, his third wife, Helene, stayed by him.

In 1946, now out of prison, Jeffers and Helene leased what was rumored to be the former Houdini estate at Laurel Canyon Boulevard and Willow Glen Road, although Houdini actually lived across the street. This property was leased from Charles Wilson, the then current owner of the property. Jeffers named the house the Temple of Yahweh and used it as a retreat for his followers. Eventually, a lawsuit was brought by neighbors who were disturbed by the group's predawn rituals.

== British Israelism ==
Jeffers was an advocate of British Israelism.

Jeffers was possibly the first to incorporate British Israelism with Saturday sabbath keeping. He used the transliterations of Yahweh and Yahshua in place of God and Jesus. Of using Yahweh as the name of God, Jeffers said, "God is not a name, it is a title." Religious scholar J. Gordon Melton points to this as a starting point where some Christian Identity groups have adopted both sabbatarianism and sacred name emphases used in Adventism.

During this time, Jeffers was associated with Gerald L. K. Smith and others in Smith's circle. Jeffers toured the South to preach that Roosevelt was the Antichrist and that New Deal programs were a certain sign of the coming end times.

== Bibliography ==
- Jeffers, Joe (1960). Was the Son of God a Jew?. Kingdom Book Store.
