= Brandt Smith =

American politician

Member of the Arkansas House of Representatives from the 58th district
- In office 2015–2023
- Preceded by: Harold Copenhaver
- Succeeded by: Jack Ladyman (redistricting)

Personal details
- Born: Curtis Brandt Smith; April 19, 1959 (age 67) Albuquerque, New Mexico, U.S.
- Party: Republican
- Spouse: Gailia Marie Smith (m. 1981)
- Children: 4
- Education: National Louis University (BA); Mid-America Baptist Theological Seminary (MA); Capella University (PhD)

Curtis Brandt Smith Jr. (born 18 April 1959) is an American politician and academic who served as a member of the Arkansas House of Representatives from the 58th district. In 2022, he was a candidate for U.S. congress in Arkansas's 1st congressional district.

== Early life and education ==
Smith was born in Albuquerque, New Mexico. The son of a pastor, his family moved frequently before settling in Jonesboro, Arkansas. He received a Bachelor of Arts degree from the National Louis University in 1990, a Master of Arts in religious education from Mid-America Baptist Theological Seminary in 1997, and a Ph.D. in management leadership from Capella University in 2011.

== Career ==
From 1992 to 2011, Smith worked as a missionary for International Mission Board. From 2006 to 2008, Smith also worked for Millennium Relief and Development Services, a non-profit organization. Smith has also been an adjunct professor at American Military University and Liberty University. Smith was elected to the Arkansas House of Representatives in November 2014 and assumed office in January 2015. In the 2021–2022 legislative session, Smith has served as vice chair of the House Judiciary Committee.

Smith was defeated by Crawford by a wide margin in the district's Republican Primary.
