= Carolyn Suzanne Sapp =

American model

- Born: April 5, 1967 (age 59); Kona, Hawaii
- Education: Hawaii Pacific University
- Title: Miss Hawaii 1991; Miss America 1992
- Predecessor: Marjorie Vincent
- Successor: Leanza Cornett
- Spouse: Alex Daniels (m. 2006)
- Children: 3

Carolyn Sapp Daniels (born Carolyn Suzanne Sapp on April 5, 1967) is an actress, singer, stuntwoman, and motivational speaker best known as the first representative from Hawaii to win Miss America in 1992.

== Early life ==
Sapp was born in Kona to Susan and Fred Sapp, a dance teacher and Lutheran minister, respectively. Her parents divorced amicably when she was an infant. Sapp was raised by her step-grandparents and attended Columbia River Bible Church and Academy in Kettle Falls, Washington from kindergarten to 12th grade.

== Pageantry ==
=== Miss Hawaii ===
After graduating high school, Sapp financed her college education at Hawaii Pacific University by winning several pageants including Miss Kona Coffee, Miss Waikiki, Miss Honolulu, and Miss Hawaii Pacific University. Sapp competed in Miss Hawaii four times before winning in 1991, enabling her to represent her state at the Miss America 1992 Pageant.

=== Miss America 1992 ===
During the preliminary competition, Sapp won the preliminary swimsuit round and was crowned the winner of the pageant on the final night of competition becoming the first Miss America titleholder outside of the contiguous United States.

A day after her coronation, it was revealed that Sapp had been in an abusive relationship with former New York Jets player Nuu Faaola whom she had dated before her Miss Hawaii tenure, and later stated that this leaked information was against her wishes as it was a personal matter. Although she had initially chosen education as her Miss America platform, Sapp also became a spokesperson for domestic violence victims, and founded the foundations Safe Places for Abused Women and Children, and Give Back a Smile.

== Activism ==
After her reign, Sapp starred as herself in the autobiographical television movie, Miss America: Behind the Crown, which depicted the physically abusive relationship between her and Faaola. In interviews about the movie, she stated, "When I learned that abuse hotlines were receiving up to 1,000 calls a day, I decided I should make the movie. If Miss America can have this happen to her and get out of it, it will help other people. Women can use my pain to help gain strength".

Sapp acted as spokesperson for, "Wal-Mart Versus Women" which promoted public awareness of the retail giant's nationwide pattern of discrimination against female employees. and was interviewed in Andrew Munger's 2007 documentary Wal*Mart Nation.

Sapp was inducted into Omicron Delta Kappa, the National Leadership Honor Society, in 2019 as an honoris causa initiate by Concordia University Irvine.

== Personal life ==
Sapp married stuntman, Alex Daniels, on January 1, 2006. Together, the couple have three children, Kai O’Cain, Keira Makanalani, and Kale’a Charlie-Rose.

Awards and achievements
Preceded by Marjorie Vincent	Miss America; 1992	Succeeded by Leanza Cornett
Preceded by Cheryl Toma	Miss Hawaii; 1991	Succeeded by Lani Stone
Preceded by Mairead O'Connor	National Sweetheart; 1990	Succeeded by Leanza Cornett
