= Charley Thornton =

American college athletics administrator (1936–2004)

Charles J. "Charley" Thornton (6 June 1936 – 16 February 2004) was an American college athletics administrator.

== Biography ==
Thornton was born on June 6, 1936, in Fort Smith, Arkansas. He graduated from Jonesboro High School in Jonesboro, Arkansas in 1954. Thornton graduated from Arkansas State College in 1958 earning the award as the top male student. After college Thornton became a sports editor at The Jonesboro Sun and then at the Arkansas Gazette.

During his career Thornton served as alumni and public relations director at Arkansas State, sports information director at Tulane University, executive assistant to Walter Byers who was the National Collegiate Athletic Association (NCAA) executive director, associate athletic director at Texas A&M University, and chief fundraiser at the University of Alabama. He was named athletic director at the University of Miami in 1979, but had to back out after his wife became seriously ill.

Thornton held the position of assistant athletic director at the University of Alabama for 18 years and was athletic director at Arkansas State University for three years. Thornton also served as the chief executive director for the Memphis Showboats of the United States Football League (USFL). Thornton was also part of the operations staff of the NCAA basketball tournament for many years. Thornton is perhaps best remembered as co-host of The Bear Bryant Show at Alabama. He also served as athletic director at Arkansas State University from 1990 to 1993.

Thornton is a member of the Hall of Fame of the College Football Sports Information Directors of America and a recipient of the Arch Ward Award.

Thornton died on February 16, 2004, in Tuscaloosa, Alabama.
