= Leanza Cornett =

American beauty pageant contestant (1971–2020)

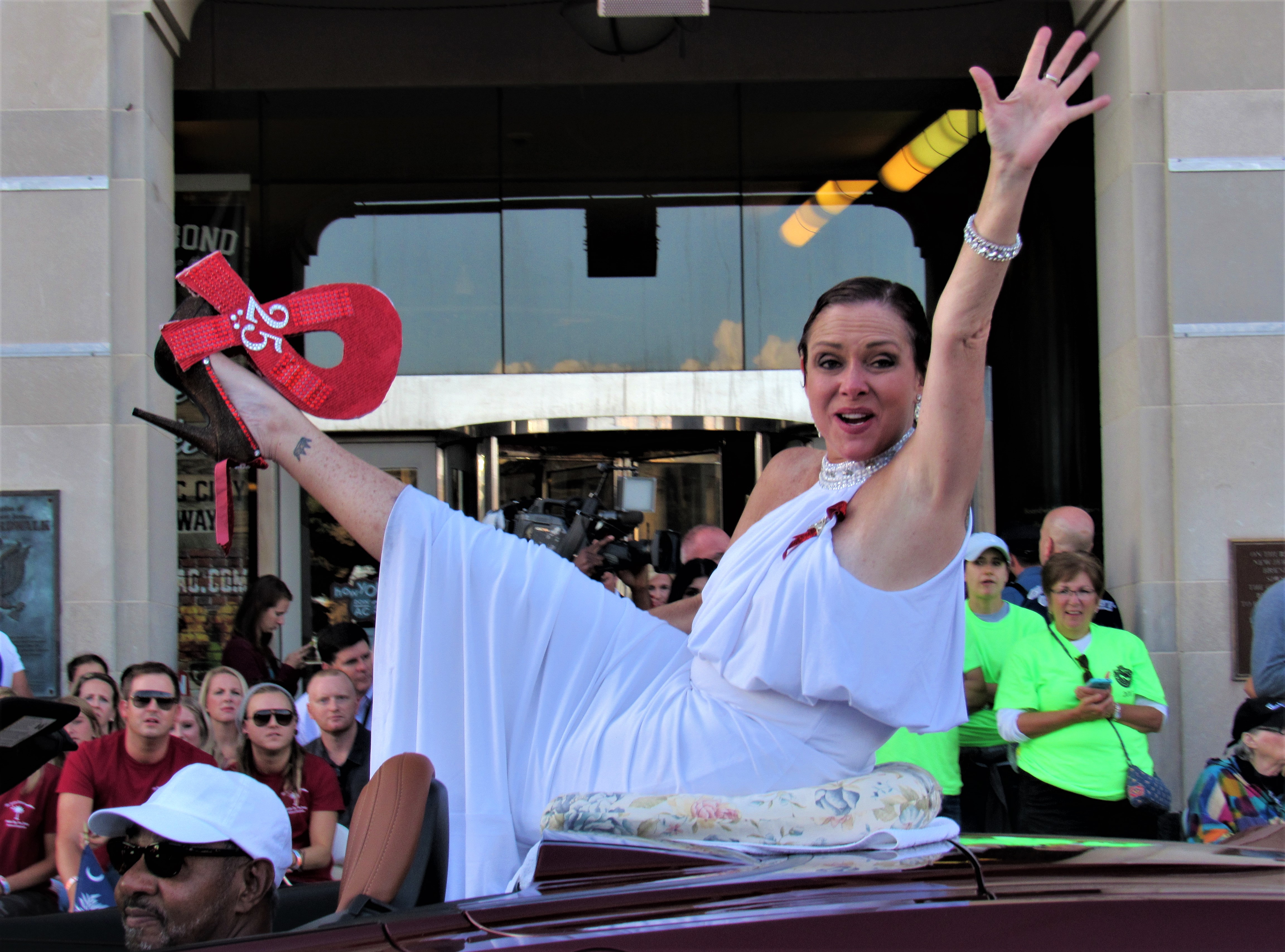
- Cornett at the 2017 Show Us Your Shoes parade in Atlantic City.
- Born: Eva Leanza Cornett; June 10, 1971; Big Stone Gap, Virginia, U.S.
- Died: October 28, 2020 (aged 49); Jacksonville, Florida, U.S.
- Education: Rollins College
- Occupations: Actress, singer
- Title: Miss Florida 1992; Miss America 1993
- Predecessor: Carolyn Sapp
- Successor: Kimberly Aiken
- Spouse: Mark Steines (m. 1995; div. 2013)
- Children: 2

Eva Leanza Cornett (June 10, 1971 – October 28, 2020) was an American television personality and beauty pageant titleholder. She was crowned Miss Florida 1992 and Miss America 1993 the same year.

== Early life ==
Cornett was born in Big Stone Gap, Virginia, and was a 1989 graduate of Terry Parker High School. She was inducted into the school's Hall of Fame in 2006.

== Pageantry ==
Cornett was previously National Sweetheart 1991. As Miss America 1993, she became the first Miss America to adopt AIDS awareness as her platform for her year of service, and was among the first titleholders who refused to wear her crown for public appearances.

== Career ==
Cornett was the first actress to play a live-action version of Ariel, the title character from The Little Mermaid, at the "Voyage of The Little Mermaid" show at Disney's Hollywood Studios at Walt Disney World Resort in 1991. She was also a member of the contemporary Christian music group Area Code, which released their single album, One Big World, before Cornett's big break.

She also served as a host for several television shows, including Entertainment Tonight (1994–1995), New Attitudes (1998), and Who Wants to Marry a Multi-Millionaire? (2000). Cornett made television guest appearances in television series such as Melrose Place, The Tick, CSI, and Saved by the Bell, and Fear Factor. In addition, she served as a reporter for Animal Planet's coverage of the Eukanuba AKC National Dog Show programs, and hosted the "On The Block" show on DIY Network.

Her stage credits included Barefoot in the Park, Godspell, The Best Little Whorehouse in Texas, Bye Bye Birdie, and Voyage of the Little Mermaid.

== Personal life ==
Cornett married broadcast journalist Mark Steines on July 22, 1995. Weeks after their wedding, Cornett was let go from her Entertainment Tonight position and immediately replaced by Steines himself. Cornett and Steines had two sons, Kai Harper (born on February 19, 2002), and Avery James (born on November 4, 2003). The couple later divorced after 17 years of marriage. She died on October 28, 2020, after being hospitalized for a head injury incurred in a fall at her home in Jacksonville, Florida.

Awards and achievements
Preceded by Carolyn Sapp	Miss America; 1993	Succeeded by Kimberly Aiken
Preceded by Mary Ann Olson	Miss Florida; 1992	Succeeded by Melinda Miller
Preceded by Carolyn Sapp	National Sweetheart; 1991	Succeeded by Elizabeth Simmons
