= Frederick C. Turner Jr. =

First Black student of Arkansas State University

Frederick C. Turner Jr. was one of the first Black students who integrated Arkansas State University, graduating in 1960. Commissioned as an infantry officer in the US Army, he served three tours in Vietnam. In 1969, he returned to ASU as Assistant Professor of Military Science to become the first Black faculty member. He later served on the staff at Supreme Headquarters Allied Powers Europe (SHAPE) and then as a member of the faculty of the Command and General Staff College at Leavenworth, Kansas. Colonel Turner retired from military service in 1982 at the rank of colonel.

== Military service ==
Turner earned an infantry officer commission in 1960 through ROTC while a student at Arkansas State. He was awarded two bronze stars during three combat tours in Vietnam. After Vietnam, he went to Belgium, where he served on the staff at Supreme Headquarters Allied Powers Europe. He later served as a member of the faculty and staff of the Command and General Staff College in Leavenworth, Kansas. Colonel Turner retired from military service and moved to Austin, Texas in 1982.

== Integration of Arkansas State ==
In 1955 Turner, Walter Strong, and Larry Williams, all graduates of Booker T. Washington High School in Jonesboro, registered to attend Arkansas State College. To avoid the media and potential opposition from White Supremacists, they met in president Carl Reng's office to register quietly. The strategy worked and the school was quietly integrated. In 1960 he became one of the two first graduates of the university. In 1969 he became the first African-American faculty member when he returned to become an assistant professor of Military Science. In 2021 ASU dedicated the Turner Military Science Building to Turner. Alone among the Arkansas Universities, the Black students were allowed to eat in the main cafeteria with White students. Turner reported that he was not targeted by the discrimination so many students faced at other universities.

In 1982, a Black alumni association was created and named the Strong-Turner Alumni Association in honor of Turner and Walter Strong, the first two Black graduates of ASU.

== Personal ==
Turner's daughter, Debbye Turner Bell was Miss America in 1990.
