= Marjorie Vincent =

American journalist (born 1964)

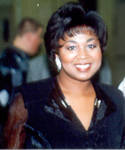
- Education: DePaul University; Duke University; Florida Coastal School of Law
- Occupation: Broadcast journalism
- Title: Miss Illinois 1990; Miss America 1991
- Predecessor: Debbye Turner
- Successor: Carolyn Sapp
- Spouse: Wesley Tripp (m. 2006)
- Children: 1

Marjorie Judith Vincent is an American journalist and former beauty contestant who was crowned Miss America 1991.

== Early life and education ==
Vincent's parents, Lucien and Florence Vincent of Cap-Haïtien, Haiti, migrated to the United States in the early 1960s; Marjorie was the first of their children to be born in the United States. She grew up in Oak Park, Illinois, attending Catholic school and taking ballet and piano lessons. Vincent entered DePaul University as a music major, switching to business in her junior year and graduating in 1988. Winnings from beauty pageants helped to pay her tuition.

== Pageantry ==
After two unsuccessful pageant tries, at Miss North Carolina and Miss Illinois, she won Miss Illinois, allowing her to advance to Miss America. At the Miss America pageant, she performed the Fantaisie-Impromptu (Op. posth. 66) by Chopin, won the crown, and became Miss America 1991 on 7 September 1990, succeeding Debbye Turner. Her win marked the first occasion in which African Americans won the Miss America title back-to-back. Vincent was the last Miss America to be serenaded by Bert Parks.

== Career ==
Vincent, who already had two years in law school at Duke University before becoming Miss America, changed her goal from international law to television journalism, becoming a news anchor at WGBC in Meridian, Mississippi, in October 1993. She later worked at WHOI in Peoria, Illinois, and the Ohio News Network in Columbus, Ohio.

Vincent completed her juris doctor degree at Florida Coastal School of Law in Jacksonville, Florida. She was admitted to the Florida Bar in 2011, and worked for the Office of the Attorney General in Daytona Beach, Florida. She currently works as an assistant district attorney in Alabama.

== Personal life ==
Vincent has a child, Cameron, who was born in 1994. She married Wesley Tripp in November 2006.

Awards and achievements
Preceded by Debbye Turner	Miss America; 1991	Succeeded by Carolyn Sapp
Preceded by Jeri Zimmerman	Miss Illinois; 1990	Succeeded by Jaclyn Greer
