= Frierson House =

Historic house in Arkansas, United States

- U.S. National Register of Historic Places
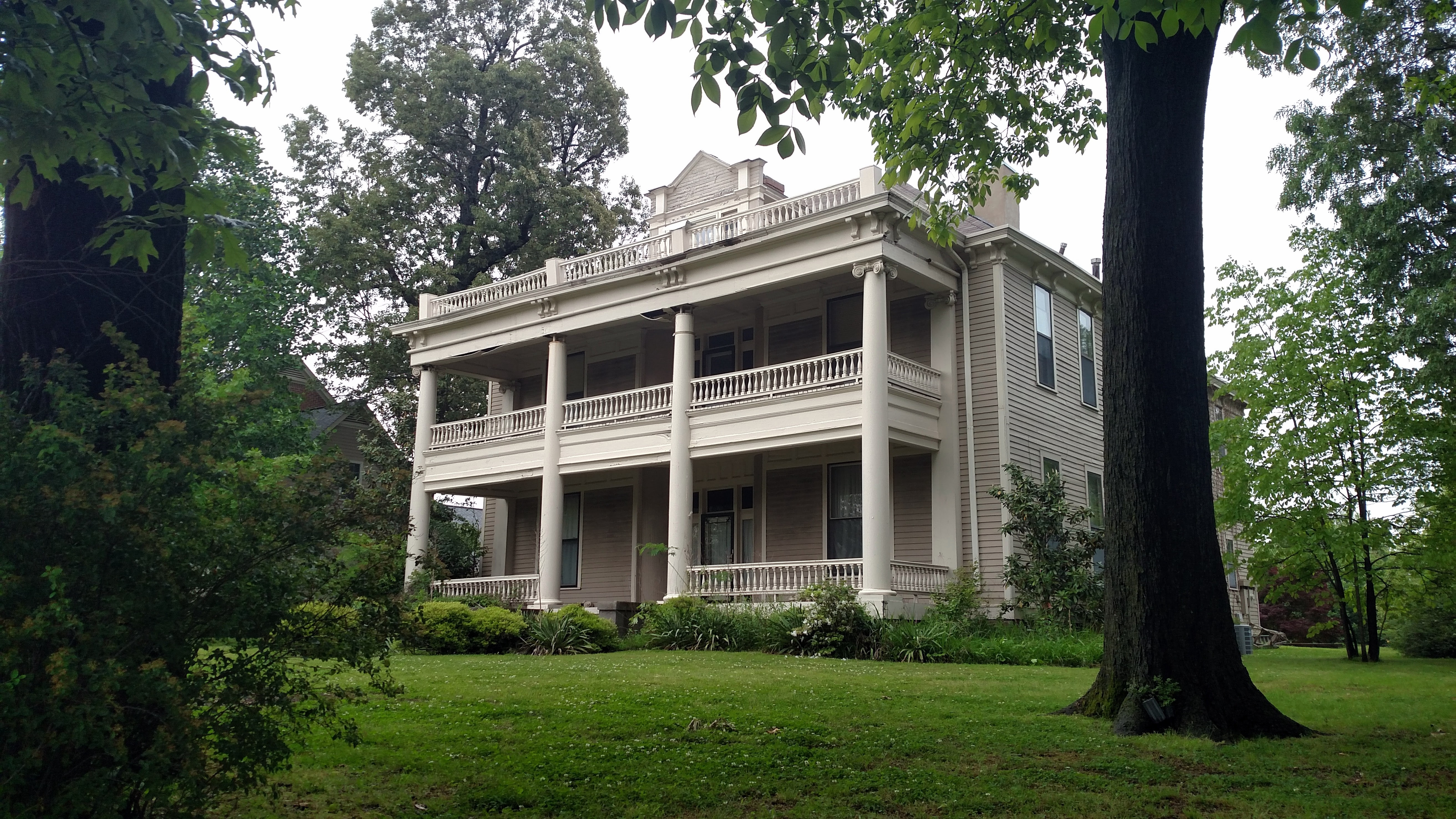

- Location within Arkansas Location within the United States
- Location: 1112 S. Main Street; Jonesboro, Arkansas
- Coordinates: 35°49′56″N 90°42′17″W
- Area: less than one acre
- NRHP reference No.: 73000381
- Added to NRHP: April 24, 1973

The Frierson House is a historic house at 1112 South Main Street in Jonesboro, Arkansas. It is a two-story wood-frame structure, with a hip roof pierced by gabled dormers. The main facade is covered by a two-story porch with Ionic columns, with a single-story porch on the side with Doric columns. The main entrance is flanked by sidelight windows and topped by a multilight transom, and is set in a recessed paneled entry framed by pilasters. Its construction date is uncertain, but is placed between 1870 and 1910 based on architectural evidence. It is a well-preserved example of a post-Civil War "town house".

The house was listed on the National Register of Historic Places in 1973.

== See also ==
- National Register of Historic Places listings in Craighead County, Arkansas
