= The Bear Bryant Show =

- Genre: Sports
- Presented by: Bear Bryant; John Forney; Bill Austin; Charley Thornton; Steadman Shealy
- No. of seasons: 25
- No. of episodes: 250+

Production
- Production location: Birmingham, Alabama

Original release
- Network: WVTM-TV
- Release: 1958 – 1982

The Bear Bryant Show is a weekly coaches' show that served as a weekly recap of the Alabama Crimson Tide football team's previous day's game. The show ran during the tenure of head coach Paul "Bear" Bryant from the 1958 through the 1982 seasons. Co-hosted by John Forney (1961–1965), Bill Austin (1966), Charley Thornton (1967–1981) and Steadman Shealy (1982), The Bear Bryant Show was a cultural phenomenon within the state of Alabama that contributed to the rise in popularity and awareness of the university's football program during the 1960s and 1970s. The show ran for an hour during its entire run.

== History ==
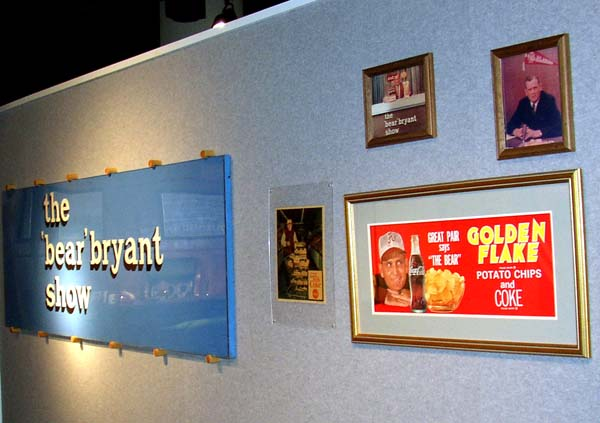
Memorabilia on display at the Bryant Museum during its "Sundays at Four" exhibit.

As part of Bryant's contract with the University, he retained all of the rights to Alabama football game films. As such, he became one of the first collegiate football head coaches to have his own television program with the start of The Bear Bryant Show in 1958. Bryant was paid $3,000 per show and insisted on it being an hour long in order to cover the game in its entirety and for its perceived recruiting benefits. In 1966, the show became one of the first television shows produced in the state of Alabama to be broadcast in color.

During the 25-year run of the program, several persons served as its co-host alongside Bryant. From the 1961 through 1965 seasons, the show was co-hosted by former Alabama broadcaster John Forney. Bill Austin, sports director of WCFT-TV in Tuscaloosa, co-hosted the 1966 season, Charley Thornton was later brought on as co-host and served alongside coach Bryant through the 1981 season. At the conclusion of that season, Thornton left Alabama to become an executive athletics director at Texas A&M University. In September 1982, former Crimson Tide quarterback Steadman Shealy was selected to serve as the co-host for the show. The announcement was made by the producer of the program, Sloan-Major Advertising. The show ended at the conclusion of the 1982 season with the retirement of Bryant as head coach of the Crimson Tide. During its run, over 250 episodes were produced and for several years the show was one of the highest-rated syndicated television shows in the country.

Although over 250 episodes were produced, only 77 episodes survive on tape. So few recordings of the show remain as a result of both the show being aired live, and many of the videotapes used to record the show in the 1970s being reused week-to-week. Many of the tapes that date back to the 1970s were recorded at the request of the father of former Alabama halfback Mike Stock, so he could watch highlights of his son with the Crimson Tide. In 1992, Golden Flake and Coke donated the 77 surviving episodes to the Paul W. Bryant Museum, and in 2001 an exhibition that featured the show called "Sundays at Four" opened at the Bryant Museum. Efforts to re-release the show on DVD have been discussed at various times, but have yet to yield fruit.

== Sponsors ==
The title sponsors of the show were the Birmingham Coca-Cola Bottling Company and Golden Flake Snack Foods. Their slogan was "a great pair, says the Bear," and each episode opened with Bryant and his co-host opening a bag of Golden Flake potato chips and bottles of Coca-Cola.

== Legacy ==
Culturally, the show reflected many of the values of the state not only in the way Bryant spoke about the game, but also in how he spoke about God, family and country. The ability of Bryant to connect with the fan base through the show helped to both "create and sustain the legend of Bear Bryant" as observed by Keith Dunnavant. During the 1960s and 1970s, National Collegiate Athletic Association (NCAA) rules prohibited teams from appearing in more than two televised games on ABC per season. As such, The Bear Bryant Show became the primary way that fans of the Crimson Tide from across the state were able to see the games. For years, the show aired on Sundays at 4:00 p.m., and its popularity regularly caused many of the stations that carried it to preempt live coverage of National Football League games during the same timeslot. In addition to providing the fans a way to see highlights from the weekly games, the show was also watched by Crimson Tide players to see what coach Bryant had to say about their individual performances.
