= Martin L. Clardy =

American politician (1844–1914)

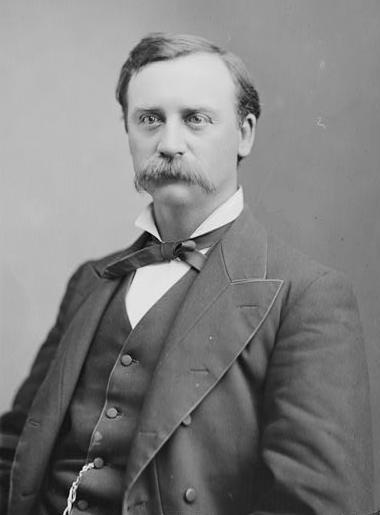
- Portrait of Clardy, Brady-Handy collection

Member of the U.S. House of Representatives from Missouri
- In office March 4, 1879 – March 3, 1889
- Preceded by: Anthony F. Ittner
- Succeeded by: William M. Kinsey
- Constituency: 1st district (1879–1883); 10th district (1883–1889)

Personal details
- Born: Martin Linn Clardy; April 26, 1844 Farmington, Missouri, USA
- Died: July 5, 1914 (aged 70) St. Louis, Missouri, USA
- Resting place: Bellefontaine Cemetery
- Party: Democratic
- Profession: Politician, Lawyer, Railroad Executive

Military service
- Allegiance: Confederate States
- Branch/service: Confederate States Army
- Rank: Major
- Unit: Clardy's Cavalry Battalion
- Battles/wars: American Civil War

Martin Linn Clardy (April 26, 1844 – July 5, 1914) was a nineteenth-century politician, lawyer and railroad executive from Missouri. Between 1879 and 1889, he served five consecutive terms in the U.S. House of Representatives.

== Biography ==
Born near Farmington, Missouri, Clardy attended Saint Louis University and the University of Mississippi and graduated from the University of Virginia.

=== Confederate States Army ===
During the Civil War, he served in the Confederate Army until the close of the war where he rose to the rank of major.

=== Early legal career ===
Afterwards, he studied law and was admitted to the bar, commencing practice in Farmington, Missouri.

=== Congress ===
Clardy was elected a Democrat to the United States House of Representatives in 1878, serving from 1879 to 1889, being unsuccessful for reelection in 1888. There, he served as chairman of the Committee on Mines and Mining from 1885 to 1887 and of the Committee on Commerce from 1887 to 1889 and was a delegate to the Democratic National Convention in 1884.

=== Later career ===
Afterward, Clardy resumed practicing law in Farmington, Missouri, moved to St. Louis, Missouri in 1894 and was appointed general attorney of the Missouri Pacific Railway and the St. Louis, Iron Mountain and Southern Railway the same year. He was elected vice president and general solicitor of the companies in 1909 which he served as until his death.

== Family, death and burial ==
Clardy had a daughter, Pearl Eugenia, who married attorney Gordon Frierson, her cousin through her mother, in 1912. He is also potentially related to Robert Walter Morgan Clardy.

Clarify died St. Louis on July 5, 1914. Clardy was interred in Bellefontaine Cemetery in St. Louis.

U.S. House of Representatives
Preceded by Anthony F. Ittner	Member of the U.S. House of Representatives from Missouri's 1st congressional district March 4, 1879 – March 4, 1883	Succeeded by William H. Hatch
Preceded by Joseph H. Burrows	Member of the U.S. House of Representatives from Missouri's 10th congressional district March 4, 1883 – March 4, 1889 (obsolete district)	Succeeded by William M. Kinsey
