= James Frierson =

American politician

James Gordon Frierson (1835–1884) was a state representative in Arkansas in 1871 and was re-elected for a second term. He also served at the 1874 Arkansas Constitutional Convention. He established a high school. He was elected a judge. He married and had 3 children.

He grew up in Mississippi and served in the Confederate Army during the American Civil War. He was the father of James Gordon Frierson Jr.
