= Kimberly Clarice Aiken =

American speaker

Kimberly Aiken
- Born: Kimberly Clarice Aiken; October 11, 1974 (age 51); Columbia, South Carolina, U.S.
- Education: New York University
- Occupations: Image consultant and motivational speaker
- Title: Miss Columbia 1993; Miss South Carolina 1993; Miss America 1994
- Predecessor: Leanza Cornett
- Successor: Heather Whitestone
- Spouse: Haven Cockerham (m. 1998)
- Children: 2

Kimberly Clarice Aiken Cockerham (born October 11, 1974) is an American image consultant, motivational speaker and was Miss America 1994.

== Pageantry ==
=== Miss South Carolina 1993 ===
She won Miss Columbia and Miss South Carolina 1993 en route to her 1994 Miss America crown. She was the first African American woman to be crowned Miss South Carolina.

=== Miss America 1994 ===
Although she did not win any preliminary awards, she was still selected as a top 10 finalist and excelled during the live pageant with a stirring vocal rendition of "Summertime" for her talent, and impressive showings in the swimsuit, evening gown, and interview competitions. Aiken was 18 years old when she won the coveted title of Miss America, and was only the fifth woman of African descent to be crowned. Aiken's pageant coach was CB Mathis of CB's Limited in Lancaster, South Carolina. Aiken used the plight of the homeless as her platform.

Aiken has made numerous television appearances and was once recognized by People Magazine as one of the "Fifty Most Beautiful People in the World".

== Education and career ==
She was initiated as a member of Delta Sigma Theta sorority at Epsilon Tau chapter. After graduating from New York University, Aiken pursued a career in public accounting with Ernst & Young LLP, one of the Big Four accounting firms. She then became an image consultant and motivational speaker, using her varied experiences and sharing stories of overcoming obstacles, such as brain surgery. She is also a regular columnist for Pageantry Magazine.

== Personal life ==
She is the daughter of Valerie and Charles Aiken of Columbia, South Carolina. She is founder for the HERO Foundation. She married Haven Cockerham in 1998 and has two children.

Awards and achievements
Preceded by Leanza Cornett	Miss America; 1994	Succeeded by Heather Whitestone
Preceded by Carrie Lee Davis	Miss South Carolina; 1993	Succeeded by Tonya Helms
