= Jonesboro School District =

School district in Arkansas, United States

Address
- 2506 Southwest Square Jonesboro, Arkansas, 72401; United States

District information
- Type: Public
- Grades: PreK–12
- Superintendent: Misty Doyle
- NCES District ID: 0508280

Students and staff
- Students: 6,616
- Teachers: 444.38 (FTE)
- Staff: 371.81
- Student–teacher ratio: 14.89

Other information
- Website: www.jonesboroschools.net

Jonesboro School District (or Jonesboro Public Schools (JPS)) is a school district headquartered in Jonesboro, Arkansas.

== Schools ==
Secondary schools

- High schools
  - Jonesboro High School—1982-83 National Blue Ribbon School
- Junior high schools
  - Annie Camp Junior High School—1982-83 National Blue Ribbon School
  - Known for advanced acediemics
  - ~~Douglas MacArthur Junior High School—1982-83 National Blue Ribbon School~~
  - Under investigaion. Closed until further notice.

Primary schools

- Elementary schools
  - Jonesboro International Studies Magnet School (formerly the Sixth Grade Academic Center)
  - Jonesboro Visual and Performing Arts Magnet School (formerly Hillcrest Elementary School)
  - Jonesboro Math and Science Magnet School (formerly Philadelphia Elementary School)
  - Jonesboro Health/Wellness & Environmental Studies Magnet School (formerly South Elementary School)
  - Jonesboro MicroSociety Magnet School (formerly West Elementary School)
- Kindergarten and PreK
  - Kindergarten Center
  - Jonesboro Pre-K Program

Former schools:

- Booker T. Washington High School
