= Lynching of Wade Thomas =

African American who was lynched in the U.S.

- Part of Red Summer
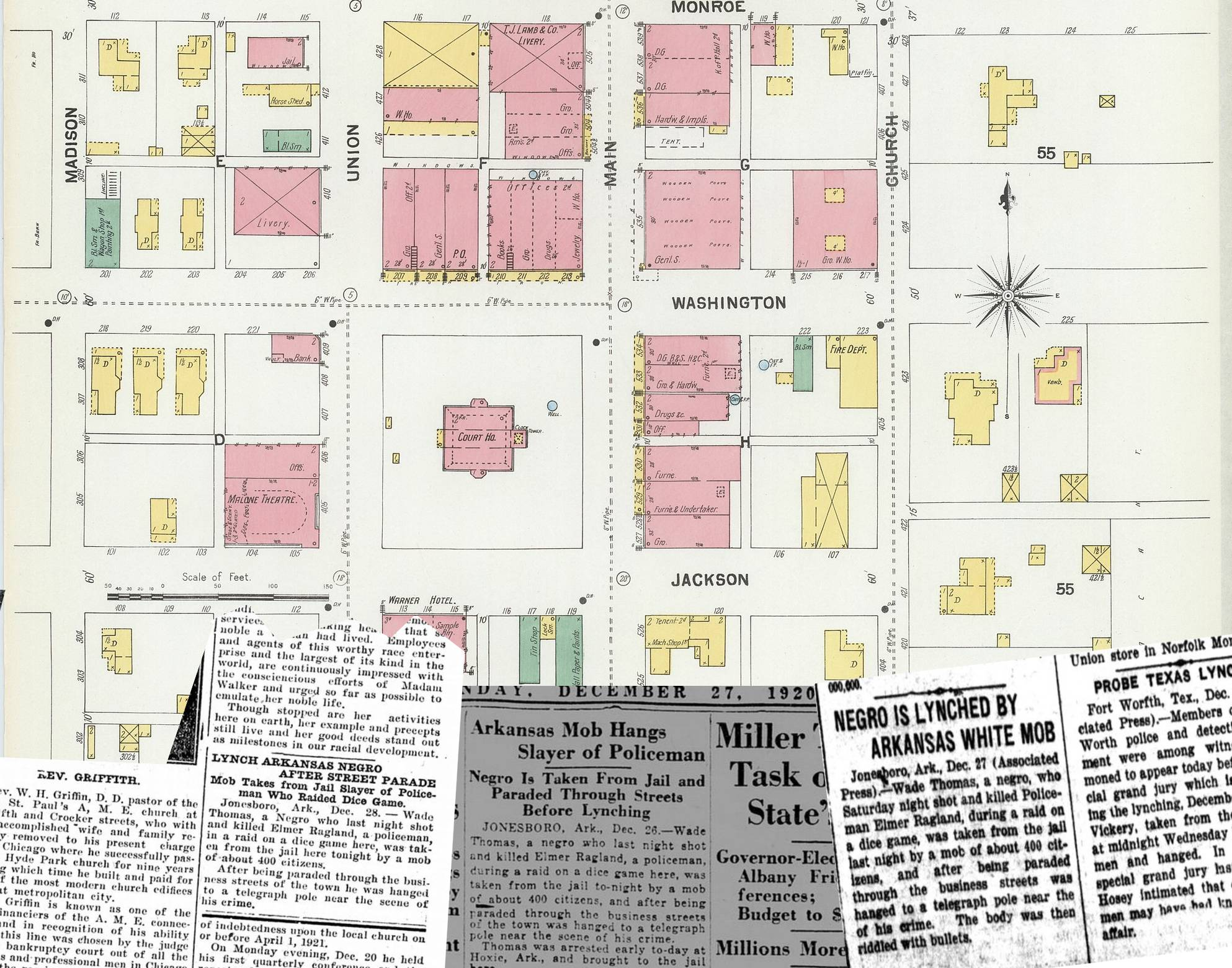
- Newspaper coverage of the Lynching of Wade Thomas in Jonesboro, Craighead County, Arkansas
- Date: December 26, 1920
- Location: City of Jonesboro's public square; 35.838149°N 90.70495°W
- Participants: White mob in Jonesboro, Arkansas
- Deaths: 1

On December 26, 1920, an African-American man named Wade Thomas was lynched in Jonesboro, Arkansas, by a white mob. The mob seized Thomas from the Jonesboro jail after he was charged with shooting a local police patrolman, Aylmer Ragland.

== Background ==
The state of Arkansas had been on edge after the deadly Elaine massacre, in which perhaps as many as 237 Black people were killed between September 30 and October 1, 1919. It was "by far the deadliest racial confrontation in Arkansas history and possibly the bloodiest racial conflict in the history of the United States." On December 25, 1920, police raided a dice game. During the raid gun fire broke out and Patrolman Aylmer Ragland was killed. Thomas was later arrested at Hoxie, Arkansas and brought to Jonesboro.

== Lynching ==
Members of the white community quietly assembled in Jonesboro until there was a mob of about 400 people. The police initially attempted to protect Thomas; Jonesboro Police Chief Gus Craig and Mayor Gordon Frierson had barricaded the jail. When the mob broke through the two surrendered Wade Thomas without a struggle because, as Mayor Frierson later recalled, "When the mob opened the door, the first half-a-dozen men standing there were leading citizens — businessmen, leaders of their churches and the community." Other Black prisoners were left alone; only Thomas was seized paraded around the town and then hanged from a telegraph pole near where Ragland was shot. His body was then riddled with bullets.

== Aftermath ==
These race riots were one of several incidents of civil unrest that began in the so-called American Red Summer of 1919. Terrorist attacks on black communities and white oppression in over three dozen cities and counties. In most cases, white mobs attacked African-American neighborhoods. In some cases, black community groups resisted the attacks, as in Chicago and Washington D.C.

Most deaths occurred in rural areas during events like the Elaine massacre in Arkansas, where an estimated 100 to 240 black people and 5 white people were killed. Also in 1919 were the Chicago Race Riot and Washington D.C. race riot which killed 38 and 39 people respectively. Both had many more non-fatal injuries and extensive property damage reaching into the millions of dollars.

== See also ==
- African American veterans lynched after WWI

== Bibliography ==
Notes

References

- Lancaster, Guy (February 1, 2019). "The unbearable whiteness of being - What's lost when we consider the history of racial violence from a white perspective". Arkansas Times.
- McWhirter, Cameron (2011). Red Summer: The Summer of 1919 and the Awakening of Black America. Henry Holt and Company. ISBN 9781429972932. - Total pages: 368
- "Arkansas Mob Hangs Slayer of Policeman". New-York Tribune. New York City. 1920. pp. 1–18. ISSN 1941-0646. OCLC 9405688.
- The New York Times (October 5, 1919). "For Action on Race Riot Peril". The New York Times. New York, NY. ISSN 1553-8095. OCLC 1645522.
- Stockley, Grif (September 30, 2019). "Elaine Massacre of 1919". Encyclopedia of Arkansas History & Culture.
