= List of mayors of Jonesboro, Arkansas =

The following is a list of mayors of the city of Jonesboro, Arkansas, United States.

== Mayors ==
Mayors of Jonesboro, Arkansas (Note: Aden Lynch, the first mayor, and Emmet Rodgers, who served before his death around 1900, are missing from this list, as may others.)List of mayors of Jonesboro, Arkansas from 1883 – till date.
Name	Term	Election	Party affiliation	Refs.
W. N. Balfour	1883 – 1885		Unknown	
James R. Taylor	1885 – 1886		Democratic	
W. A. Maywood	1886 – 1892			
N. J. Thompson	1892			
Edward W. Hillis	1892 – 1895			
J. T. Stoddard	1895 – 1896			
A. E. Hastings	1896 – 1899			
Harry W. Applegate	1899 – 1903			
John B. Nichols	1903 – 1905	1903		
E. F. Young	1905 – 1907			
Charles B. Gregg	1907 – 1911			
Tom Burress	1911 – 1915			
G. W. Turner	1915 – 1917			
Gordon Frierson	1917 – 1921	1917 1919		
Herbert Bosler	1921 – 1927			
Eli Whitney Collins	1927 – 1929			
Herbert Bosler	1929 – 1947			
Roy Penix	1947 – 1949		Democratic	
Herbert Bosler	1949 – 1953			
Herbert Sanderson	1953 – 1957			
Ben Miller	1958 – 1959			
Herbert Sanderson	1959 – 1966			
Neil Stallings	1967 – 1986	1968 1972 1976 1980 1982		
Hubert Brodell	1987 – 2004	1986 1990 1996 2000		
Doug Formon	2005 – 2009	2004		
Harold Perrin	2009 – January 1, 2021	2008 2012 2016		
Harold Copenhaver	January 1, 2021 – Incumbent	2020 2024	Democratic	

== See also ==
- History of Jonesboro
- List of mayors of places in Arkansas
