= Debbye Turner =

American TV anchor, veterinarian, talk show host and beauty queen

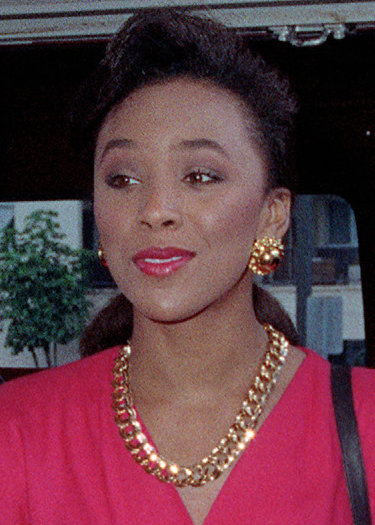
- Turner in 1990
- Born: September 19, 1965 (age 60); Honolulu, Hawaii, United States
- Education: Arkansas State University; University of Missouri
- Occupations: Veterinarian, talk show host, pastor
- Title: Miss Missouri 1989; Miss America 1990
- Predecessor: Gretchen Carlson
- Successor: Marjorie Vincent
- Spouse: Gerald Bell (m. 2008)
- Children: 1
- Website: www.debbyeturner.com

Debrah Lynn 'Debbye' Turner Bell (born September 19, 1965 in Honolulu, Hawaii) is an American television anchor, veterinarian, talk show host, former beauty queen and winner of the 1990 Miss America pageant.

== Early life and education ==
Turner was born in Honolulu, Hawaii and raised in Jonesboro, Arkansas. Turner earned a Bachelor of Science in agriculture from Arkansas State University, and attended the University of Missouri. She is a member of Alpha Kappa Alpha sorority. Turner also spent a couple of years honing her public service skills working for Safeway Stores.

In 1991, she received her Doctor of Veterinary Medicine degree from the University of Missouri College of Veterinary Medicine. She became a spokesperson for Purina and pursued a career in veterinary medicine before going into television.

== Pageantry ==
Turner was the first runner-up at the Miss Arkansas Pageant, a state preliminary competition for the Miss America program in 1988.

In the summer of 1989, she won the Miss Missouri title and went on to win the 1990 Miss America crown. Turner is a singer, pianist, and skilled percussionist, evidenced by her marimba rendition of '"Flight of the Bumblebee"' in the talent portion of the 1990 Miss America contest. Turner was the third African-American national titleholder and the first—and as of 2019, the only—Miss Missouri to be crowned Miss America.

== Career ==
Turner's first hosting job came at the St. Louis NBC affiliate KSDK, on a show called Show Me St. Louis in 1995.

Six years later, Turner joined CBS News as a feature correspondent then became their "resident veterinarian" and a fill-in anchor. Turner was also a fill-in anchor on the CBS Morning News. Turner left CBS in 2012. She has appeared on Animal Planet's Cats 101 and Dogs 101 series. She was the host of Arise America, on Arise News. She is currently the Leadership and discipleship leader at Kentwood Community Church, located in Grand Rapids Michigan.

== Personal life ==
Turner is the daughter of Frederick C. Turner, Jr. and Gussie Turner. Turner married Gerald Bell in 2008. The couple has a daughter.

Turner's older sister, Suzette, is married to megachurch pastor, Kirbyjon Caldwell.

Awards and achievements
Preceded by Gretchen Carlson	Miss America; 1990	Succeeded by Marjorie Vincent
Preceded by Heather Smith	Miss Missouri; 1989	Succeeded by Pat Meusburger
Preceded by Melissa Aggeles	National Sweetheart; 1988	Succeeded by Mairead O'Connor
