= Elizabeth Jacoway =

American author

Elizabeth Jacoway (born June 16, 1944) is a historian and author in the United States who has written about the history of Arkansas. Her grandmother Peggy Jacoway wrote a book about the First Ladies of Arkansas published in 1941.

She grew up in Little Rock, Arkansas. She won the Booker Worthen Literary Prize.

She wrote a book about desegregation in Little Rock.

She appears in the film Daisy Bates: First Lady of Little Rock, a film about Daisy Bates. Historian Brooks Blevins was one of her students.

== Books ==
- Yankee missionaries in the South: The Penn School experiment (1980)
- No Straight Path; Becoming Women Historians (2019), editor
- Turn Away Thy Son: Little Rock, the Crisis that Shocked the Nation (2007)
- Understanding the Little Rock Crisis: An Exercise in Remembrance and Reconciliation, with C. Fred Williams
- Adaptable South: Essays in Honor of George Brown Tindall, co-editor
- Arkansas Women: Their Lives and Times (Southern Women: Their Lives and Times, entry on Daisy Lee Bates
