= Booker T. Washington High School (Jonesboro, Arkansas) =

Former Black High school in Arkansas

Coordinates: 35.8367°N 90.6948°W

Booker T Washington High School (BTW), originally known as Jonesboro Industrial High School (IHS) was named in honor of Booker T. Washington, and was the first high school for African-Americans in Northeast Arkansas. It provided education for African-American children over a wide swath of Northeastern Arkansas, as sundown towns such as Paragould, Arkansas and other surrounding cities and counties contracted with Jonesboro to educate their Black children.

== History ==
The Colored School Improvement Association successfully lobbied the city Council to donate bricks from a collapsed city-owned auditorium, and raised money for a site for a school to be built. The original lot at the intersection of Bridge and Hope streets was purchased for $2,600. While the bricks were transported to the site and cleaned, several attempts to build the high school were thwarted. After D.W. Hughes signed on as principal of the Cherry Street School that served students through grade 8, he garnered support for building the high school at a new lot at Logan and Patrick Street. Using the bricks from the demolished auditorium, Hughes designed a new building, and IHS finally opened in 1924.

In 1933, the Jonesboro School Board divested the school in the middle of the school year, forcing students to pay tuition. Around half of the students dropped out. In 1935 the school was renamed after Black author and educator Booker T. Washington. After World War II, the school initiated sports program and took Eskimoes as their nickname. In 1951 the school was relocated to a site at Houghton St and Matthews Avenue. In 1954 the old building was torn down.

In order to offset the cost of education, the school board contracted with surrounding school boards to educate Black students at BTW. These included Bay, Lake City, Paragould, Biggers, Pocahantas, Walnut Ridge, Black Rock, Imboden, Weiner, Trumann, and various others.

In 1954, the U.S. Supreme Court in Brown v. Board of Education of Topeka, Kansas declared laws maintaining separate public schools for Black and White children to be unconstitutional. Lawyer Wiley A. Branton challenged the arrangement Jonesboro had with other school districts, threatening to file suit against the Jonesboro School District and all contracting districts unless they provided education for Black children nearer their homes. Jonesboro cancelled all the contracts at the end of the 1957-1958 school year. At this time, the school board adopted a Freedom of Choice plan that allowed children to choose to attend schools regardless of their race. As a result of the changes, BTW's enrollment dropped dramatically. The school board closed the school in 1966. The building was demolished in 2001. The site is now occupied by the E. Boone Watson Community Center and African American Cultural Center, which preserves black culture in Jonesboro.

== Notable people ==
Frederick C. Turner, Jr., First student, faculty member at Arkansas State University. Commander of U.S. Army Forces at Supreme Headquarters Allied Powers Europe (SHAPE).

== See also ==
- List of things named after Booker T. Washington
