= Harold Copenhaver =

American politician (born 1961)

Member of the Arkansas House of Representatives from the 58th district
- In office January 14, 2013 – January 2015
- Preceded by: Jody Dickinson
- Succeeded by: Brandt Smith

Mayor of Jonesboro, Arkansas
- Incumbent
- Assumed office January 1, 2021
- Preceded by: Harold Perrin

Personal details
- Born: July 17, 1961 (age 65)
- Spouse: Kathleen Copenhaver
- Children: 3
- Education: Arkansas State University
- Profession: Politician

Harold 'Cope' Copenhaver (born July 17, 1961) is an American politician and a former Democratic member of Arkansas House of Representatives, representing District 58 from 2013 to 2015. After being unseated by Republican challenger Brandt Smith in the 2014 GOP landslide in Arkansas, he worked as a Senior Business Development Officer for Centennial Bank in Jonesboro. In August 2016, Copenhaver announced his candidacy for Mayor of Jonesboro, challenging two-term incumbent Harold Perrin. He finished second to the incumbent but failed to secure enough votes to force a runoff. In November 2020, Copenhaver was elected mayor of Jonesboro with Perrin's endorsement. He was reelected in the 2024 election.

Copenhaver also established the Mayor’s Youth Advancement Council, designed to engage high school students in civic leadership, community service, and city government. The council has grown from 40 members at its inception to nearly 100 participants by 2025.

== Awards ==
In September 2024, Copenhaver was named Mayor of the Year by the Arkansas Association of Chiefs of Police—the first Jonesboro mayor to receive the award. The award recognized his leadership and investments in public safety, including significant pay increases for first responders, expansion of police and fire personnel, and implementation of advanced technology such as the real-time crime center.

- 2024 – Mayor of the Year, awarded to Mayor Copenhaver by the Arkansas Association of Chiefs of Police.

== Personal life ==
He and his wife Kathleen were named Red Wolf Family of the Year in 2009 by Arkansas State University for their commitment to community service and university involvement. They have three children.

== Education ==
Copenhaver attended Arkansas State University.

== Elections ==
In 2012, Copenhaver ran unopposed in the May 22 Democratic primary and won the November 6 general election with 5,682 votes (53.0%) against Representative Jon Hubbard.

Copenhaver was elected in the 2020 Jonesboro mayoral election and was reelected in the 2024 election.

== Electoral history ==
=== 2012 ===
Arkansas House of Representatives 58th District general election, 2012
| Party | Candidate | Votes | % |
|---|---|---|---|
| Democratic | Harold Copenhaver | 5,682 | 53% |
| Republican | Jon Hubbard (incumbent) | 5,037 | 47% |
| Democratic gain from Republican | | | |

=== 2014 ===
Arkansas House of Representatives 58th District general election, 2014
| Party | Candidate | Votes | % |
|---|---|---|---|
| Republican | Brandt Smith | 4,396 | 52.6% |
| Democratic | Harold Copenhaver | 3,950 | 47.4% |
| Republican gain from Democratic | | | |

=== 2016 ===
2016 Jonesboro mayoral election
| Party | Candidate | Votes | % |
|---|---|---|---|
| Nonpartisan | Harold Perrin (incumbent) | 11,465 | 48.98% |
| Nonpartisan | Harold Copenhaver | 5,673 | 24.23% |
| Nonpartisan | John Street | 3,135 | 13.39% |
| Nonpartisan | Nathan Coleman | 1,830 | 7.81% |
| Nonpartisan | Amanda Dunavant | 835 | 3.58% |
| Nonpartisan | Thomas Elwood | 465 | 1.98% |

=== 2020 ===
2020 Jonesboro mayoral election
| Party | Candidate | Votes | % |
|---|---|---|---|
| Nonpartisan | Harold Copenhaver | 12,730 | 50.38% |
| Nonpartisan | Andy Shatley | 10,917 | 43.21% |
| Nonpartisan | Thomas Elwood | 1,619 | 5.41% |

=== 2024 ===
2024 Jonesboro mayoral general election
| Party | Candidate | Votes | % |
|---|---|---|---|
| Nonpartisan | Harold Copenhaver | 10,982 | 45.44% |
| Nonpartisan | LJ Bryant | 8,381 | 34.41% |
| Nonpartisan | Jeremy Terrell | 3,784 | 15.79% |
| Nonpartisan | Thomas Elwood | 909 | 3.79% |

2024 Jonesboro mayoral election runoff
| Party | Candidate | Votes | % |
|---|---|---|---|
| Nonpartisan | Harold Copenhaver | 5,264 | 60.44% |
| Nonpartisan | LJ Bryant | 3,446 | 39.56% |

== See also ==
- List of mayors of Jonesboro, Arkansas
