= Jonesboro, Arkansas =

City in Northeast Arkansas

- City
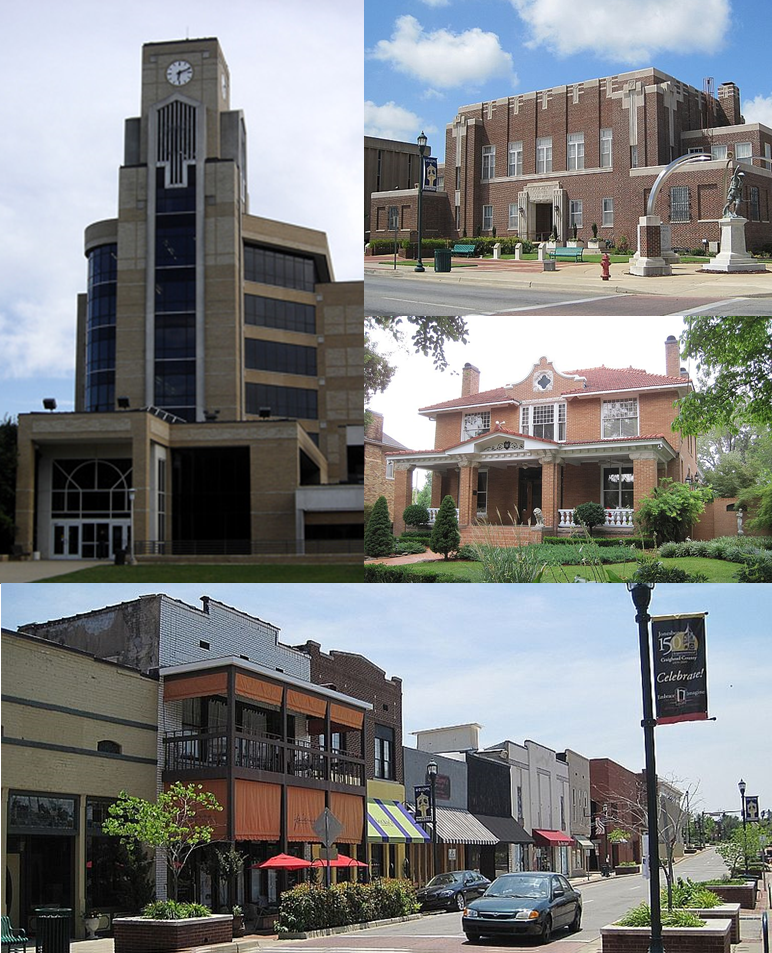
- Clockwise from top: Craighead County Courthouse, a house in the West Washington Avenue Historic District, downtown Jonesboro, and the Dean B. Ellis Library at Arkansas State University

- Flag Seal
- Motto(s): People, Pride, Progress
- Interactive map of Jonesboro, Arkansas
- Location within Arkansas
- Coordinates: 35.8198°N 90.6790°W
- Country: United States
- State: Arkansas
- County: Craighead
- Founded: February 19, 1859
- Incorporated: February 15, 1883
- Named for: State Senator; William A. Jones

Government
  - Type: Mayor–Council
  - Mayor: Harold Copenhaver (D)
  - Chief administrative officer: Brian Richardson
  - Chief operating officer: Tony Thomas
  - Office Manager: Tracy McGaha
  - Administrative Assistant: Tonya Hottel

Area
  - City: 80.724 sq mi (209.074 km^{2})
  - Land: 80.172 sq mi (207.645 km^{2})
  - Water: 0.552 sq mi (1.429 km^{2}) 0.68%
- Elevation: 276 ft (84 m)

Population (2020)
  - City: 78,576
  - Estimate (2025): 83,296
  - Rank: US: 441st AR: 5th
  - Density: 980.09/sq mi (378.42/km^{2})
  - Urban: 73,781 (US: 383rd)
  - Metro: 139,440 (US: 304th)
  - Combined: 186,851 (US: 147th)
- Time zone: UTC–6 (Central (CST))
  - Summer (DST): UTC–5 (CDT)
- ZIP Codes: 72401, 72402, 72403, 72404, 72405
- Area code: 870
- FIPS code: 05-35710
- GNIS feature ID: 2404811
- Highways: AR 1, AR 18, US 49, US 63, US 78, I-555
- Website: jonesboroar.gov

Jonesboro (/ˈdʒoʊnzbʌrə/) is a city in and it is one of two county seats of Craighead County, Arkansas, United States. The population was 78,579 as of the 2020 census, and was estimated at 83,296 in 2025, making it the fifth-most-populous city in Arkansas. Located on Crowley's Ridge in the northeastern part of the state. Jonesboro is the home of Arkansas State University and is the cultural and economic center of Northeast Arkansas.

In 2025, the Jonesboro metropolitan area had a population of 139,440, and the greater Jonesboro–Paragould combined statistical area had a population of 186,851.

== History ==
The Jonesboro area was first inhabited for thousands of years by indigenous peoples. At the time of the European encounter, historic tribes included the Osage, Caddo, and Quapaw. The name for the state of Arkansas comes from the Quapaw language. The French and Spanish traders and trappers had relations with those groups.

After the United States acquired this territory in the Louisiana Purchase of 1803, American settlers eventually made their way to an area near Jonesboro. They began exploring, hunting, trapping, and trading with local Indian tribes. The permanent settlement of Jonesboro was established shortly after 1859, when Craighead County was established.

In 1859, land was taken from nearby Greene, Mississippi, and Poinsett Counties and was used to form Craighead County. Jonesboro was designated as the original county seat. As the population increased to the west of the county, Lake City was named as the second seat. Jonesboro had 150 residents in 1859. It was named after State Senator William A. Jones in recognition of his support for the formation of Craighead County. Originally spelled Jonesborough, the city name was later shortened to its present-day spelling.

In 1881, a young woman was brutally murdered in an apparent robbery. Her father had left their farm for a short while and returned to find her in a pool of her own blood. Four black men were arrested in conjunction with the crime, and after their trial, the Jonesboro Lynching of 1881 took place at midnight on March 12. The Decatur Daily Republican reported that the four men, called Green Harris (sometimes referred to as Hawes), Giles Peck, John Woods (sometimes referred to as Jud Woods), and Burt Hoskins (sometimes referred to as Haskins)—had been arrested and tried before magistrates Jackson and Akers at New Haven Church, 8 miles north of Jonesboro. The hearing, which found that the men were guilty, was attended by several hundred people. According to this and several other reports, the accused made a complete confession. The magistrates bound them over to the grand jury, and they were ordered taken to the jail in Jonesboro. The hour being late, however, it was decided to hold them overnight in the church under a strong guard. The large crowd gradually dispersed, "muttering threats of vengeance." Around midnight, between 200 and 300 masked men surrounded the church, overpowered the guards, and broke in the doors and windows. They seized the accused, dragged them to a tree about 200 yards away, and hanged them. Once again, the crowd dispersed, "leaving the bodies of their victims dangling in the air and presenting a horrible spectacle in the moonlight." According to the Republican, "The crime and punishment form one of the blackest pages in the annals of the state.

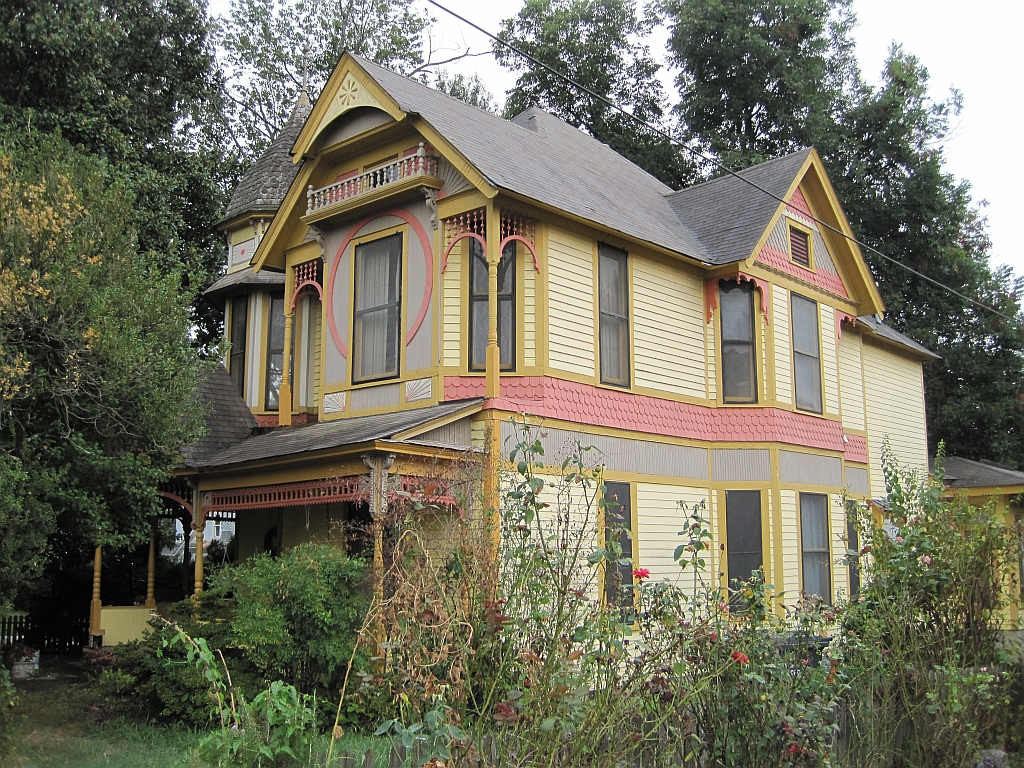
The Bell House is one of 12 Jonesboro sites listed on the National Register of Historic Places.

During the late 19th century, the city tried to develop its court system and downtown infrastructure. Shortly after the city was named county seat, the highest point in Jonesboro was identified and a courthouse was planned for construction. This was delayed for several years, for the locals did not want to ruin their deer hunting. The first courthouse was finally completed but was destroyed by a fire in 1869. A store across from this site was rented and used as a courthouse. It was destroyed in an 1876 fire. Another building was constructed on the same site, but it fell to a fire in 1878, a major one that destroyed most of downtown Jonesboro. Soon afterward, another courthouse was constructed; it was replaced by the present courthouse in 1934.

The St. Louis Southwestern Railway, known as the Cotton Belt Railroad was constructed through Jonesboro, with its tracks passing just north of the center of the city. During the first train's journey, it became stuck and supplies had to be carried into town. It connected St. Louis to points in Arkansas and Texas. Other major railways began to construct tracks to and from Jonesboro, including the St. Louis–San Francisco Railway and Missouri Pacific Railroad. Some of the rail companies still own and use the tracks that run through Jonesboro.

The city set up the Jonesboro School District in 1899. In 1900, St. Bernard's Regional Medical Center was established by the Olivetan Benedictine Sisters. The Grand Leader Department Store, the first in the city, was opened in 1900. Woodland College and two schools within the Jonesboro School District were opened in 1904. Arkansas State College (now Arkansas State University) was established in 1909, a year in which the first horseless carriages were driven in the city. A recording on a Sanborn Fire Insurance Map dates back to March 1897 of a Presbyterian church existing at the corner of Church St. and Monroe, and a Christian church located at the corner of Union and Huntington Ave. Other early churches of the city were started in the 1910s. First Baptist Church was founded in 1911, and First Methodist Church in 1916.

Wade Thomas was lynched on December 26, 1920, in downtown Jonesboro. A large white mob seized Thomas after he allegedly shot local Patrolman Elmer Ragland during a Christmas Day raid on a local dice game. He was paraded through the town and then hanged and his body riddled with bullets.

On September 10, 1931, Governor Harvey Parnell authorized the Arkansas National Guard to be deployed in Jonesboro to quell the Church War, a clash between the followers of Joe Jeffers and Dow H. Heard, the pastor of the First Baptist Church of Jonesboro. Jeffers' supporters also attacked the mayor and police chief, resulting in front-page coverage of the incident in The New York Times.

On May 15–16, 1968, an F4 tornado struck Jonesboro, destroying 164 homes. At least 34 people died and more than 350 people were injured as a result of the tornado, which struck the town without warning at 10:00 pm.

On May 27, 1973, shortly after midnight, an F4 tornado struck Jonesboro, killing three and injuring 289. Damage was estimated at $60 million.

On March 24, 1998, a school shooting occurred at Westside Middle School. Two young boys (aged 11 and 13 years) fired upon students at Westside Middle School while hidden in woodlands near the school. They killed four students and one teacher and injured 10 persons.

In the 2007–2008 school year, the Jonesboro Public School District elementary schools were reclassified as magnet schools.

=== 2020 tornado ===
A "large, destructive" EF3 tornado struck Jonesboro on March 28, 2020, causing severe damage to The Mall at Turtle Creek and at least 20 minor injuries, and two severe injuries.

== Geography ==
Jonesboro is located atop Crowley's Ridge in northeastern Arkansas.

According to the United States Census Bureau, the city has an area of 80.724 square miles (209.07 km^{2}), of which 80.172 square miles (207.64 km^{2}) is land and 0.552 square miles (1.43 km^{2}) (0.68%) is water.

=== Climate ===
Jonesboro has a humid subtropical climate (Köppen climate classification Cfa).

Climate data for Jonesboro 2 NE, AR (1991–2020 normals, extremes 1893–present)
Month	Jan	Feb	Mar	Apr	May	Jun	Jul	Aug	Sep	Oct	Nov	Dec	Year
Record high °F (°C)	82 (28)	83 (28)	95 (35)	96 (36)	101 (38)	110 (43)	116 (47)	111 (44)	110 (43)	98 (37)	88 (31)	79 (26)	116 (47)
Mean maximum °F (°C)	66.7 (19.3)	71.1 (21.7)	78.4 (25.8)	84.7 (29.3)	90.1 (32.3)	95.6 (35.3)	97.7 (36.5)	97.8 (36.6)	94.0 (34.4)	87.5 (30.8)	77.4 (25.2)	68.4 (20.2)	99.5 (37.5)
Mean daily maximum °F (°C)	45.6 (7.6)	50.5 (10.3)	60.0 (15.6)	70.7 (21.5)	79.2 (26.2)	87.2 (30.7)	89.7 (32.1)	89.0 (31.7)	83.0 (28.3)	72.4 (22.4)	58.8 (14.9)	48.6 (9.2)	69.6 (20.9)
Daily mean °F (°C)	36.1 (2.3)	40.4 (4.7)	49.0 (9.4)	59.2 (15.1)	68.2 (20.1)	76.6 (24.8)	79.7 (26.5)	78.5 (25.8)	71.5 (21.9)	60.3 (15.7)	48.0 (8.9)	39.3 (4.1)	58.9 (14.9)
Mean daily minimum °F (°C)	26.7 (−2.9)	30.2 (−1.0)	38.0 (3.3)	47.7 (8.7)	57.2 (14.0)	66.1 (18.9)	69.6 (20.9)	68.0 (20.0)	60.0 (15.6)	48.1 (8.9)	37.2 (2.9)	30.1 (−1.1)	48.2 (9.0)
Mean minimum °F (°C)	10.9 (−11.7)	15.7 (−9.1)	22.0 (−5.6)	33.2 (0.7)	44.1 (6.7)	56.0 (13.3)	61.8 (16.6)	59.1 (15.1)	46.9 (8.3)	33.7 (0.9)	23.1 (−4.9)	16.1 (−8.8)	8.4 (−13.1)
Record low °F (°C)	−18 (−28)	−13 (−25)	1 (−17)	26 (−3)	32 (0)	41 (5)	50 (10)	45 (7)	33 (1)	21 (−6)	9 (−13)	−7 (−22)	−18 (−28)
Average precipitation inches (mm)	3.90 (99)	4.11 (104)	5.23 (133)	5.36 (136)	5.73 (146)	3.35 (85)	3.61 (92)	3.69 (94)	3.50 (89)	3.97 (101)	4.89 (124)	4.68 (119)	52.02 (1,321)
Average snowfall inches (cm)	1.0 (2.5)	1.2 (3.0)	1.2 (3.0)	0.0 (0.0)	0.0 (0.0)	0.0 (0.0)	0.0 (0.0)	0.0 (0.0)	0.0 (0.0)	0.0 (0.0)	0.1 (0.25)	0.4 (1.0)	3.9 (9.9)
Average precipitation days (≥ 0.01 in)	9.1	8.6	10.2	9.4	10.1	7.3	7.8	7.2	6.6	8.3	9.2	9.6	103.4
Average snowy days (≥ 0.1 in)	0.7	0.8	0.3	0.0	0.0	0.0	0.0	0.0	0.0	0.0	0.1	0.3	2.2
Source 1: National Oceanic and Atmospheric Administration
Source 2: National Centers for Environmental Information

== Demographics ==
Historical population
Census	Pop.	Note	%±
1870	155		—
1890	2,065		—
1900	4,508		118.3%
1910	7,123		58.0%
1920	9,384		31.7%
1930	10,326		10.0%
1940	11,729		13.6%
1950	16,310		39.1%
1960	21,418		31.3%
1970	27,050		26.3%
1980	31,530		16.6%
1990	46,534		47.6%
2000	55,515		19.3%
2010	67,263		21.2%
2020	78,576		16.8%
2025 (est.)	83,296		6.0%
U.S. Decennial Census; 2020 Census

According to realtor website Zillow, the average price of a home as of July 31, 2026, in Jonesboro was $228,083.

As of the 2024 American Community Survey, there were 33,732 estimated households in Jonesboro with an average of 2.34 persons per household. The city has a median household income of $51,672. Approximately 23.1% of the city's population lives at or below the poverty line. Jonesboro has an estimated 56.6% employment rate, with 35.6% of the population holding a bachelor's degree or higher and 90.5% holding a high school diploma. There were 36,969 housing units at an average density of 461.12 per square mile (178.04/km^{2}).

The median age in the city was 33.7 years.

Jonesboro, Arkansas – racial and ethnic composition Note: the US Census treats Hispanic/Latino as an ethnic category. This table excludes Latinos from the racial categories and assigns them to a separate category. Hispanics/Latinos may be of any race.
Race / ethnicity (NH = non-Hispanic)	Pop. 1980	Pop. 1990	Pop. 2000	Pop. 2010	Pop. 2020
White alone (NH)	28,516 (90.44%)	42,076 (90.42%)	46,764 (84.24%)	49,062 (72.94%)	49,502 (63.00%)
Black or African American alone (NH)	2,643 (8.38%)	3,687 (7.92%)	6,209 (11.18%)	12,319 (18.31%)	17,756 (22.60%)
Native American or Alaska Native alone (NH)	99 (0.31%)	145 (0.31%)	168 (0.30%)	190 (0.28%)	186 (0.24%)
Asian alone (NH)	148 (0.47%)	376 (0.81%)	448 (0.81%)	1,011 (1.50%)	1,627 (2.07%)
Pacific Islander alone (NH)	—	—	13 (0.02%)	23 (0.03%)	49 (0.06%)
Other race alone (NH)	0 (0.00%)	4 (0.01%)	57 (0.10%)	64 (0.10%)	228 (0.29%)
Mixed race or multiracial (NH)	—	—	559 (1.01%)	1,091 (1.62%)	3,512 (4.47%)
Hispanic or Latino (any race)	124 (0.39%)	247 (0.53%)	1,297 (2.34%)	3,503 (5.21%)	5,716 (7.27%)
Total	31,530 (100.00%)	46,534 (100.00%)	55,515 (100.00%)	67,263 (100.00%)	78,576 (100.00%)

=== 2020 census ===
As of the 2020 census, there were 78,576 people, 30,620 households, and 18,964 families residing in the city. The population density was 980.02 inhabitants per square mile (378.39/km^{2}). There were 33,271 housing units at an average density of 414.96 per square mile (160.22/km^{2}). The racial makeup of the city was 64.55% White, 22.77% African American, 0.34% Native American, 2.08% Asian, 0.07% Pacific Islander, 3.78% from some other races and 6.42% from two or more races. Hispanic or Latino people of any race were 7.27% of the population.

=== 2010 census ===
As of the 2010 census, there were 67,263 people, 26,111 households, and 16,637 families residing in the city. The population density was 842.17 inhabitants per square mile (325.16/km^{2}). There were 28,321 housing units at an average density of 354.59 per square mile (136.91/km^{2}). The racial makeup of the city was 74.71% White, 18.41% African American, 0.36% Native American, 1.51% Asian, 0.04% Pacific Islander, 2.96% from some other races and 2.01% from two or more races. Hispanic or Latino people of any race were 5.21% of the population.

=== 2000 census ===
As of the 2000 census, there were 55,515 people, 22,219 households, and 14,353 families residing in the city. The population density was 697.12 inhabitants per square mile (269.16/km^{2}). There were 24,263 housing units at an average density of 304.68 per square mile (117.64/km^{2}). The racial makeup of the city was 85.37% White, 11.27% African American, 0.32% Native American, 0.83% Asian, 0.03% Pacific Islander, 1.05% from some other races and 1.13% from two or more races. Hispanic or Latino people of any race were 2.34% of the population.

There were 22,219 households out of which 30.1% had children under the age of 18 living with them, 48.9% were married couples living together, 12.2% had a female householder with no husband present, and 35.4% were non-families. 27.5% of all households were made up of individuals and 9.0% had someone living alone who was 65 years of age or older. The average household size was 2.38 and the average family size was 2.93.

In the city the population was spread out with 22.9% under the age of 18, 16.6% from 18 to 24, 28.1% from 25 to 44, 20.5% from 45 to 64, and 11.8% who were 65 years of age or older. The median age was 32 years. For every 100 females there were 92.1 males. For every 100 females age 18 and over, there were 88.8 males.

The median income for a household in the city was $32,196, and the median income for a family was $42,082. Males had a median income of $31,668 versus $21,633 for females. The per capita income for the city was $17,884. 17.4% of the population and 12.9% of families were below the poverty line. Out of the total people living in poverty, 22.4% were under the age of 18 and 12.3% were 65 or older.

== Awards ==
Jonesboro has received multiple state and national recognitions for excellence in infrastructure, planning, recreation, and public-safety initiatives. In 2024, the city was given the Airport of the Year award by the Arkansas Division of Aeronautics for improvements at the Jonesboro Municipal Airport. That same year, Mayor Harold Copenhaver was recognized as Mayor of the Year by the Arkansas Association of Chiefs of Police for his leadership in public safety and support of crime-reduction technology.

In 2024, Jonesboro's Health Accelerator Plan earned the Plan of the Year (population 30,000+) award from the Arkansas Chapter of the American Planning Association. The city also received the Trail of the Year (Natural Surface) award for Craighead Forest Park and the Tourism Program of the Year for the African American Cultural Center at the E. Boone Watson Community Center from the Arkansas Recreation and Parks Association.

Other recognitions include the 2024 Trendsetter City of the Year – Diversity and Inclusion Award from the Arkansas Municipal League for programs such as Project SEARCH, Project CARE, and the Social Determinants of Health Study, as well as prior Trendsetter honors for Infrastructure and Water (2023), Education and Workforce Development (2022), and Technology and Security (2022).

== Economy ==
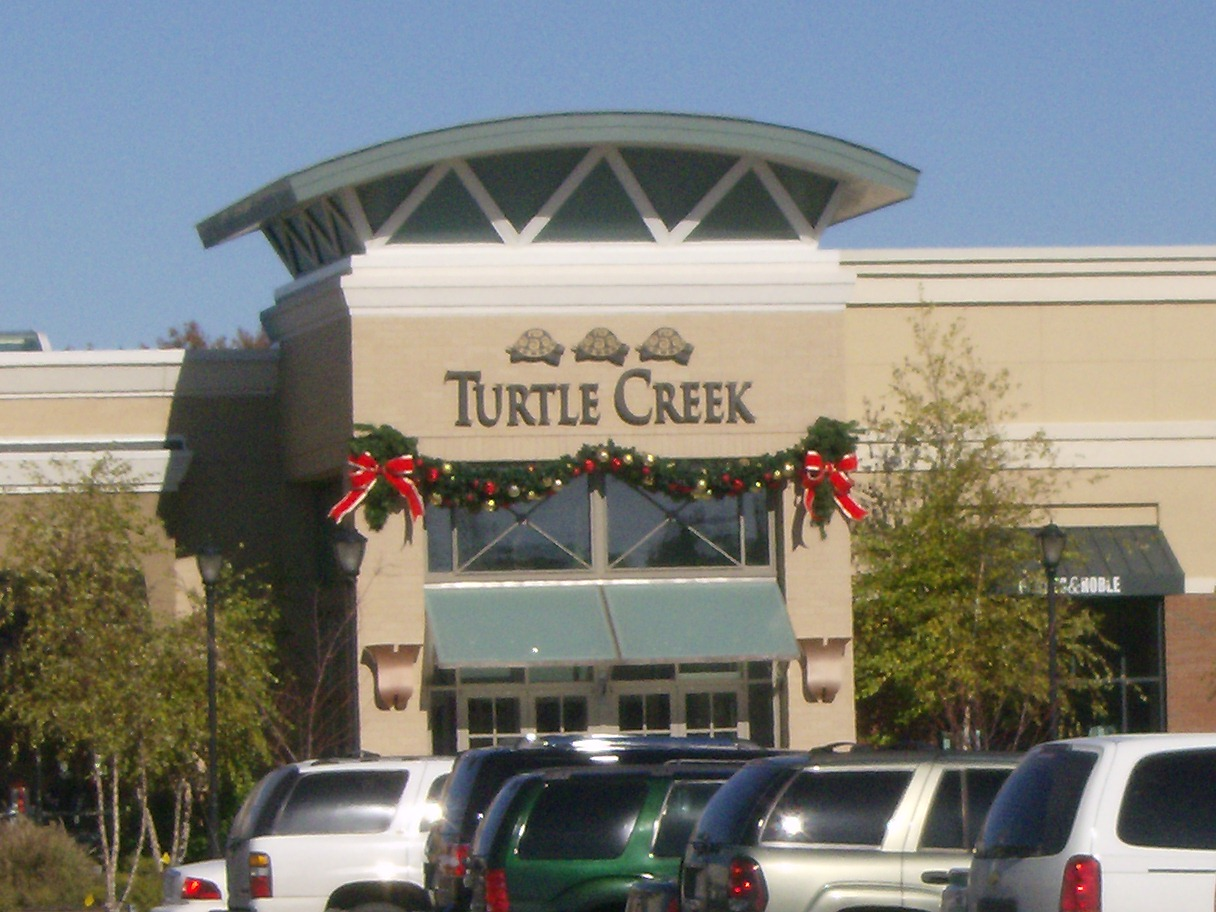
The Mall at Turtle Creek entrance

The Mall at Turtle Creek, opened in 2006, was the largest mall in northeast Arkansas and was the only enclosed mall constructed in the country that year. The mall closed in 2020 due to tornado damage; currently, the only stores in operation at Turtle Creek are Dillard's, JCPenney, and Target.

Before the Mall at Turtle Creek opened, Indian Mall, named for the former mascot of Arkansas State University, was the primary shopping destination in northeast Arkansas. The Indian Mall was demolished in 2012.

In 2025, the former Turtle Creek mall site was sold for about US$4.85 million, and redevelopment plans are underway to transform parts of it into an open-air, mixed-use center.

== Arts and culture ==
=== Points of interest ===
Craighead Forest Park is a city-owned park located on Crowley's Ridge, featuring a 60-acre fishing lake, camping facilities, hiking/biking trails, nature areas, picnic sites, and recreational fields.

Crowley's Ridge Parkway runs through Jonesboro. It was designated one of Arkansas' Scenic Byways in 1997, and it was designated Arkansas' first National Scenic Byway in 1998.

In 2004, the Arkansas Game and Fish Commission opened the 160-acre Forrest L. Wood Crowley's Ridge Nature Center in south Jonesboro, adjacent to Craighead Forest Park. The center includes exhibits on the origins and history of the ridge, wildlife, educational models and displays, land and water features, hiking trails, an observation tower, and an auditorium.

Located on the ASU campus, the Arkansas State University Museum is accredited by the American Association of Museums and features 21,000 square feet of historic, archaeological, and natural-history exhibits. The museum focuses on the history and cultural heritage of Northeast Arkansas and the Mississippi River Delta region. The [museum interprets the history and culture of the Crowley's Ridge Region and the Lower Mississippi River Valley. Accredited by the American Association of Museums, it is one of only four accredited museums in the state. The museum is located in the west wing of the library and museum complex on the ASU campus, and admission is free.

The Fowler Center, also located on the ASU campus, features a concert hall, drama stage, experimental theatre, teaching gallery, and grand lobby. It hosts the annual Fowler Center performance series, visiting musicians, and ASU Theatre Department productions.

The Bradbury Art Museum presents exhibitions of contemporary art in a variety of media, showcasing regional, national, and international artists. It also features biannual student exhibitions from the ASU Department of Art. The museum is located within the Fowler Center and is free and open to the public.

The Forum Theatre, located in historic downtown Jonesboro, is home to the Foundation of Arts, a regional nonprofit organization that offers community theatre, art, dance, drama, and music programs. The forum hosts several productions each year, with auditions open to the public.

The Delta Symphony Orchestra, the only professional symphony orchestra in Northeast Arkansas, has served the region for more than four decades. It presents a variety of concerts and educational programs and is known for its commitment to artistic excellence and community engagement.

The First National Bank Arena (formerly the Convocation Center) was completed in 1987 and can host events ranging from concerts and conventions to sporting events and trade shows. The arena seats up to 11,500 for concerts and 10,529 for basketball games and includes banquet space, meeting rooms, and a lecture hall.

The Craighead County Jonesboro Public Library is a full-service facility located in downtown Jonesboro. It offers print and digital collections, a children's library, and community programs throughout the year.

The Jonesboro Parks and Recreation Department manages more than 26 parks and four cemeteries covering over 900 acres. Facilities include athletic fields, water features, community centers, trails, and numerous recreational programs and events.

Historic Downtown Jonesboro is home to galleries, boutiques, restaurants, and performance venues such as the Forum Theatre. The area serves as the center for arts and entertainment in the city.

Visit Jonesboro serves as the city's tourism and visitor information hub, promoting events, attractions, dining, and lodging across the area.

== Education ==
=== Higher education ===
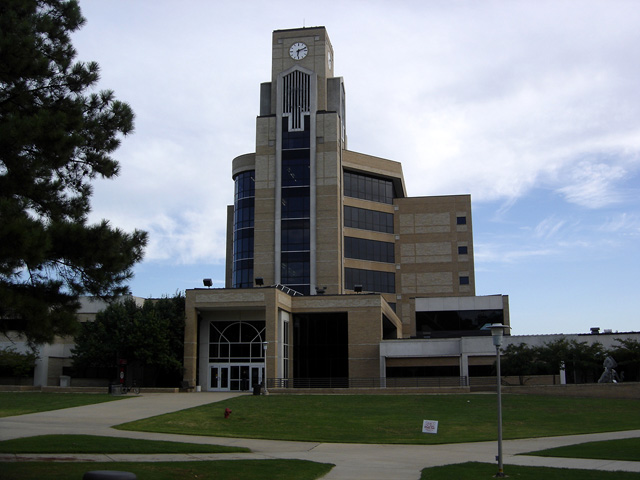
The Dean B. Ellis Library at Arkansas State University's main campus

Arkansas State University (ASU) is located in Jonesboro. New York Institute of Technology College of Osteopathic Medicine maintains a second location on ASU's campus in Wilson Hall.

The Northeast Arkansas Career and Tech Center is also located in Jonesboro.

=== Elementary and secondary education ===
Six public school districts operate within the city limits of Jonesboro:

- Jonesboro School District - Operates Jonesboro High School
- Valley View School District
- Nettleton School District - operates Nettleton High School
- Westside Consolidated School District
- Bay School District
- Brookland School District

Prior to school integration in the United States, a separate set of schools was maintained for white and black children. Booker T. Washington High School provided education for black children from surrounding areas under contract at until the schools were finally integrated. Jonesboro was a leader in educating African-American Children.

== Media ==
Television
Call sign	Channel	Network(s)
KAIT	8.1	ABC
KAIT	8.2	NBC
KAIT	8.3	CW+
KTEJ	19.1	PBS
KTEJ	19.2	Create
KTEJ	19.3	PBS Kids
KTEJ	19.4	World
KJNB-LD/KJNE-LD	39.1/42.1	FOX
KJNB-LD/KJNE-LD	39.2/42.2	CBS
KJNB-LD/KJNE-LD	39.3/42.3	MeTV/MyNetworkTV
KVTJ	48.1	Religious

FM radio
Call sign	Frequency	Format	Branding
KASU	91.9	Public Radio	91.9 KASU
K224DW (KDXY-HD3)	92.7	Soft AC	EZ 92.7 FM
K237FI (KNEA)	95.3	Sports	95.3 The Ticket
K253BQ (KJBX-HD2)	98.5	Classic Country	98.5 The Outlaw
KEGI	100.5	Classic Rock	100.5 The Eagle Rocks
K267AS (KBTM)	101.3	News/Talk	News Talk 101.3 KBTM
KIYS	101.7	Top 40 (CHR)	101.7 KISS-FM
KLEK-LP	102.5	Community	102.5 KLEK
KFLO-LP	102.9	Adult Hits	KFLO 102.9FM
KDXY	104.9	Country	104.9 The Fox
KJBX	106.3	Hot AC	Mix 106.3
K298AV (KDXY-HD2)	107.5	Rhythmic Top 40 (CHR)	107.5 The Party Station
KFIN	107.9	Country	The BIG 107.9 KFIN

AM radio
Call sign	Frequency	Format	Branding
KNEA	970	Sports	95.3 The Ticket
KBTM	1230	News/Talk	News Talk 101.3 KBTM

== Infrastructure ==
=== Transportation ===
==== Air service ====
The region is served by the Jonesboro Municipal Airport, which is served by Southern Airways Express through the federally subsidized Essential Air Service program.

==== Public transport ====
The city is served by Jonesboro Economical Transit (GOJO). As of 2026, GOJO operates four fixed routes, as well as paratransit service for disabled persons. Intercity bus service to the city is provided by Greyhound Lines.

==== List of highways ====
- Interstate 555
- US 49
- US 63
- US 78
- Highway 1
- Highway 1B
- Highway 18
- Highway 18S
- Highway 91
- Highway 141
- Highway 226
- Highway 351
- Highway 463
- Highway 877

== Notable people ==
- Blake Anderson, football coach
- Gordon Anderson, sculptor
- David Auburn, playwright and screenwriter, best known for Proof
- Earl Bell, pole vaulter and Olympian
- Wes Bentley, actor, born in Jonesboro
- Gene Bradley, former quarterback for the New Jersey Generals
- Al Bramlet, former labor union leader
- Rodger Bumpass, voice of Squidward on SpongeBob SquarePants
- Hattie Wyatt Caraway, first woman elected to the U.S. Senate
- Paul Caraway, son of Hattie Caraway; high commissioner of U.S. Civil Administration of the Ryukyu Islands
- Matt Cavenaugh, Broadway actor
- Francis Cherry, former Arkansas governor (1953–1955)
- Austin Cook, professional golfer
- Harold Copenhaver, current mayor of Jonesboro
- Rick Crawford, U.S. congressman
- Ferd Dreher, football player
- Michelle Gray, state representative since 2013
- John Grisham, novelist
- Jeff Hartwig, pole vaulter
- Julia Butterfly Hill, environmental activist
- Larry Lacewell, former director of scouting for Dallas Cowboys
- Evan Lindquist, first Artist Laureate of Arkansas
- Kyle Dean Massey, Broadway actor
- Dustin McDaniel, former Arkansas attorney general
- Malik Monk, basketball player
- Ben Murphy, actor, known for role in Alias Smith and Jones
- Jon Olsen, Olympic gold medalist swimmer
- Billy Lee Riley, rockabilly musician
- David Ring, Christian evangelist and motivational speaker
- Jeremy Sivits, former U.S. Army soldier discharged after connections to Abu Ghraib torture and prisoner abuse
- Brandt Smith, member of the Arkansas House of Representatives
- W. Stephen Smith, voice teacher, author, and Northwestern University professor
- John W. Snyder, U.S. secretary of the treasury under President Harry S. Truman
- Dan A. Sullivan, member of Arkansas House of Representatives since 2015
- Charley Thornton, college sports administrator
- Dwight Tosh, member of Arkansas House of Representatives since 2015
- Bobby Lee Trammell, rockabilly musician
- Debbye Turner, Miss America 1990
- Frederick C. Turner, Jr., one of the first Black students and first Black faculty member at ASU; U.S. Army officer
- Zach Williams, Christian rock artist

== See also ==
- List of cities and towns in Arkansas
- List of municipalities in Arkansas
- National Register of Historic Places listings in Craighead County, Arkansas
