= Arkansas Highway 239 =

State highway in Arkansas, United States

Highway 239
- AR 239 in red, AR 239S in blue

Route information
- Maintained by ArDOT
- Existed: July 1957–present

Section 1
- Length: 1.47 mi (2.37 km)
- South end: AR 325
- North end: CR 718 (Port Road) in Osceola

Section 2
- Length: 10.30 mi (16.58 km)
- South end: AR 148
- North end: AR 181

Location
- Country: United States
- State: Arkansas
- Counties: Mississippi

Highway system
- Arkansas Highway System; Interstate; US; State; Business; Spurs; Suffixed; Scenic; Heritage
← AR 238	→ AR 240

Highway 239 (AR 239, Hwy. 239) is the name of three state highways in Mississippi County.

== Route description ==
=== Osceola ===
Section 0 of Highway 239 is a 1.47-mile (2.37 km) state highway near Osceola. AR 239 begins at an intersection with AR 325 south of Osceola and heads east first crossing railroad tracks at-grade then a three-way intersection. AR 239 turns north at this intersection into Osceola. Just inside the city limits, state maintenance ends and the road continues as Chestnut Street.

=== Blytheville ===
Sections 1 and 2 of Highway 239 are two state highways totaling 10.30 miles (16.58 km)- one that runs from Clear Lake to AR 18 in Blytheville and another segment from AR 18 west of Blytheville to AR 181 north of Dell. Starting from AR 148, it heads due north towards Blytheville. The highway enters the city limits as it crosses over I-55. Its name becomes South Ruddle Road as it passes the AR 312 / East Sawyer Street intersection. It intersects the western terminus of AR 239S and a railroad before ending at AR 18 / East Main Street. The overlap with AR 18/AR 151 west through downtown Blytheville is not signed. Continuing west, Highway 151 breaks from the overlap to the north, with AR 239 splitting west at the Blytheville city limits. The route heads west for about 1.3 miles (2.1 km) before making a sharp left turn towards the south then gradually curves back to the west. It ends at AR 181 at Half Moon.

== Major intersections ==
Mile markers reset at some concurrencies. The entire route is in Mississippi County.

Location	mi	km	Destinations	Notes
	0.00	0.00	AR 325 – Osceola	Southern terminus
Osceola	1.47	2.37	CR 718 (Port Road)	Northern terminus
Gap in route
	0.00	0.00	AR 148 east	Southern terminus, AR 148 western terminus
Blytheville			AR 312 east (Promised Land Road)	AR 312 western terminus
Blytheville			AR 239S east (Locust Street/Industrial Drive)	AR 239S western terminus
Blytheville	4.35	7.00	US 78 / AR 18 (Main Street) / AR 151 – Armorel, Jonesboro, Gosnell	
Gap in route
	0.00	0.00	US 78 / AR 18 to I-55 – Manila	Eastern terminus
	5.95	9.58	AR 181 – Calumet, Dell	Western terminus
1.000 mi = 1.609 km; 1.000 km = 0.621 mi: Concurrency terminus

== Spur route ==
Highway 239S
- Location: Blytheville
- Length: 1.73 mi (2.78 km)

Highway 239 Spur (AR 239S) is a spur route in Blytheville. It is 1.73 miles (2.78 km) in length and known locally as either Locust Street or Industrial Drive.
