= Arkansas Highway 18 =

State highway in Arkansas, United States

Highway 18

Route information
- Maintained by ArDOT
- Existed: 1926–present

Section 1
- Length: 0.93 mi (1,500 m)
- West end: AR 69 near Jacksonport
- East end: AR 17 in Diaz

Section 2
- Length: 92.83 mi (149.40 km)
- West end: AR 17 in Diaz
- Major intersections: I-57 / US 67 in Newport; US 78 / AR 226 in Cash; I-555 / US 49 / US 63 / US 78 in Jonesboro; US 49 in Jonesboro; US 78 / AR 18S in Jonesboro; US 61 in Blytheville; I-55 / US 78 in Blytheville
- East end: Mississippi River

Location
- Country: United States
- State: Arkansas
- Counties: Jackson, Poinsett, Craighead, Mississippi

Highway system
- Arkansas Highway System; Interstate; US; State; Business; Spurs; Suffixed; Scenic; Heritage
← AR 17	→ AR 19

Arkansas Highway 18 (AR 18) is a designation for two state highways in northeast Arkansas. One segment of 0.93 miles (1.50 km) runs from Highway 69 east of Jacksonport east to Highway 17 in Diaz. A second segment of 92.83 miles (149.40 km) runs from Highway 17 in Diaz east to the Mississippi River.

== Route description ==
=== Jacksonport to Diaz ===
Highway 18 begins at Highway 69 east of Jacksonport and heads north for 0.93 miles (1.50 km) until it reaches the intersection of Highway 17 in Diaz, where it terminates.

=== Diaz to Mississippi River ===
The route begins at Highway 17 in Diaz and runs east, before meeting I-57/US 67 in Newport. Highway 18 continues east to Highway 37 in Grubbs before turning north at Uno to US 78/Highway 226 in Cash. The route joins Highway 91 and becomes King's Highway.

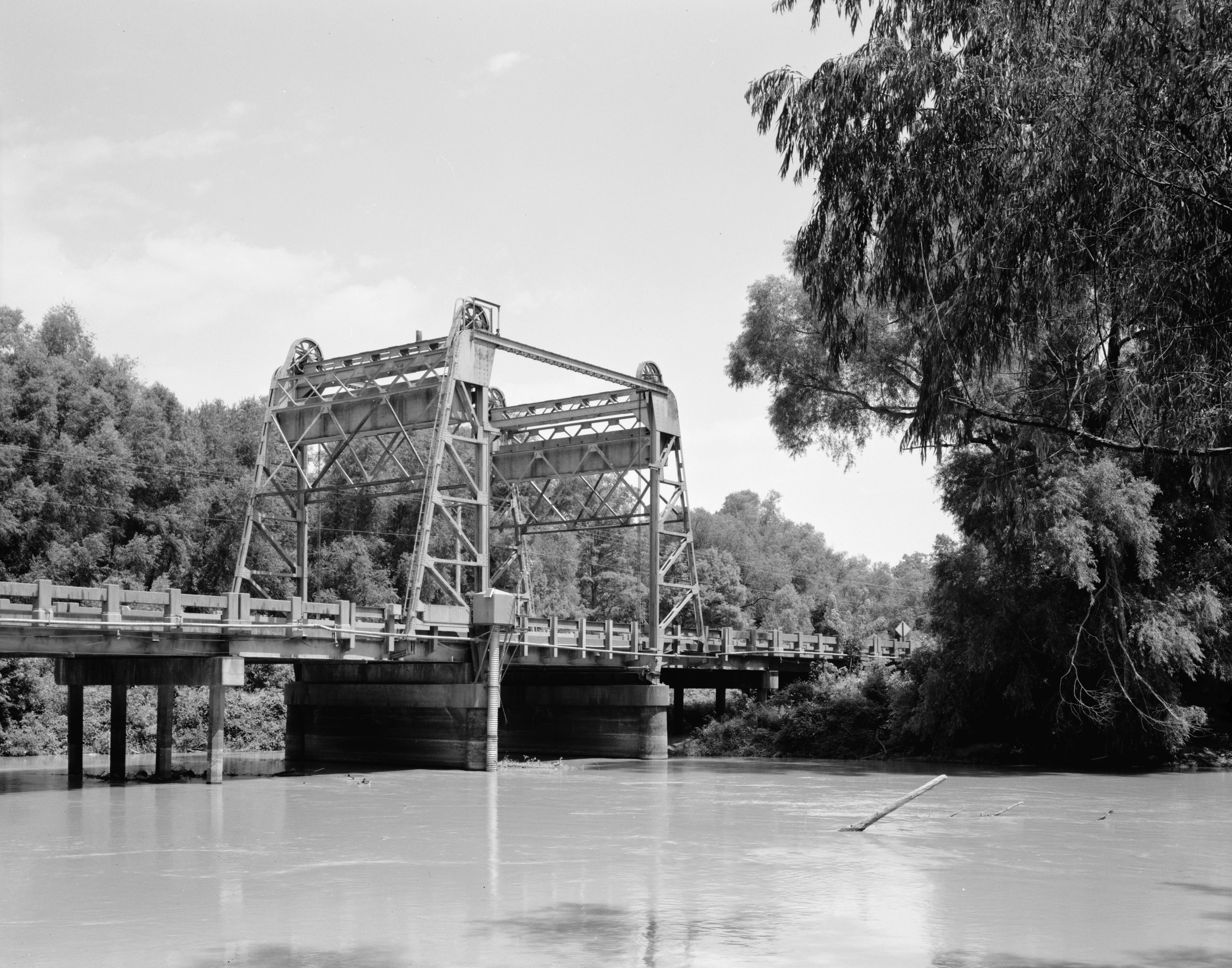
Highway 18 bridge over the St. Francis River in Lake City, July 1988

Highway 18/Highway 91 run together with US 63 into Jonesboro. Highway 18 breaks and runs as Highland Drive, meeting US 49/Highway 1. Then later, it meets US 78 again, but this time is where it begins concurrency with. After Jonesboro, US 78/Highway 18 meets Highway 158 and Highway 135 in Lake City. The four routes continue east to Black Oak, when US 78/Highway 18 turns north. US 78/Highway 18 meets Highway 139 in Monette before continuing east. Highway 18B is created in Manila, and US 78/Highway 18 meets Highway 77.

Both routes briefly meets Highway 181 near Dell before turning northeast to Blytheville. US 78/Highway 18 meet Highway 151 and US 61 in downtown Blytheville. The route continues east to cross over I-55 (exit 67) in a frontage road interchange where US 78 departs from the highway to enter I-55. Highway 18 and Highway 312 meet briefly south of the Blytheville Municipal Airport. The route continues east to terminate at the Mississippi River.

== Major intersections ==
Mile markers reset at some concurrencies.

County	Location	mi	km	Exit	Destinations	Notes
Jackson		0.000	0.000		AR 69 – Newport, Newark	Western terminus
Jackson	Diaz	0.931	1.498		AR 17 – Diaz, Newport	Eastern terminus
Jackson	Diaz	Gap in route				
Jackson	Diaz	0.00	0.00		AR 17 north	Western terminus; southern terminus of AR 17
Jackson	Newport–Diaz line				AR 367 – Hoxie, Walnut Ridge, Newport	Former US 67
Jackson	Newport–Diaz line				I-57 / US 67 – Jonesboro, Bald Knob, Little Rock	Exit 85 on I-57
Jackson	Newport–Diaz line				AR 267 south (Commerce Boulevard)	Northern terminus of AR 267
Jackson	Newport				AR 980 – Airport, Arkansas State University-Newport	
Jackson					AR 18S west – Newport Airport, Arkansas State University-Newport	Eastern terminus of AR 18S
Jackson					AR 384 west – Stegall	Eastern terminus of AR 384
Jackson	Grubbs				AR 37 north – Tuckerman	Western end of AR 37 concurrency
Jackson					AR 37 south to AR 14	Eastern end of AR 37 concurrency
Poinsett	Uno				AR 214 east to US 49 – Bayou DeView WMA	Western terminus of AR 214
Craighead	Cash				US 78 / AR 226 to US 67 – Jonesboro	
Craighead	Three Way	30.58	49.21		AR 91 north – Walnut Ridge, Jonesboro	Western end of AR 91 concurrency
Craighead	Herman				AR 349 south – Gibson	Northern terminus of AR 349
Craighead	Jonesboro			Western end of freeway section		
Craighead	Jonesboro			49	I-555 north / US 63 north / AR 91 south (Dan Avenue) – Walnut Ridge, Hoxie, Hardy	Eastern end of AR 91 concurrency; western end of I-555/US 63 concurrency
Craighead	Jonesboro			47	Washington Avenue	
Craighead	Jonesboro			46	AR 226 west (Wood Springs Road) / Strawfloor Road	Eastern terminus of AR 226
Craighead	Jonesboro	0.00	0.00	45	I-555 south / US 49 / US 63 south / US 78 (Southwest Drive) – Memphis, Waldenburg, Brinkley, Craighead Forest Park	Eastern end of I-555/US 63 concurrency
Craighead	Jonesboro	0.00	0.00	Eastern end of freeway section		
Craighead	Jonesboro				AR 1B south to I-555	Northern terminus of AR 1B
Craighead	Jonesboro				US 49 (Red Wolf Boulevard)	
Craighead	Jonesboro				AR 351 south (Industrial Drive)	Northern terminus of AR 351
Craighead	Jonesboro				US 78 west / AR 18S west	Western end of US 78 concurrency; eastern terminus of AR 18S
Craighead	Lake City				AR 158 west – Lunsford	Eastern terminus of AR 158
Craighead	Lake City				AR 135 north – Paragould	Southern terminus of AR 135
Craighead	Black Oak				AR 135 south – Caraway, Lepanto	Northern terminus of AR 135
Craighead	Monette				AR 139 north (Edmonds Street)	Southern terminus of AR 139
Craighead	Monette				AR 139 south – Caraway	Northern terminus of AR 139
Mississippi	Leachville				AR 119 north to AR 77 – Leachville	Southern terminus of AR 119
Mississippi	Manila				AR 18B east (West Lake Street) – Manila Business District	Western terminus of AR 18B; former AR 77
Mississippi	Manila	35.10	56.49		AR 77 north – Leachville	Southern terminus of AR 7
Mississippi	Manila				AR 77 south – Athelstan	Northern terminus of AR 77
Mississippi					AR 181 south – Victoria	Northern terminus of AR 181
Mississippi	Dell				AR 181 north – Dell Business District	Southern terminus of AR 181
Mississippi					AR 312 east	Western terminus of AR 312
Mississippi					AR 239 north – Half Moon	Southern terminus of AR 239
Mississippi	Blytheville				AR 151 north – Gosnell	Southern terminus of AR 151
Mississippi	Blytheville	53.16	85.55		US 61 (Division Street) to I-55 – Blytheville Business District	
Mississippi	Blytheville				AR 239 south (Ruddle Street)	Northern terminus of AR 239
Mississippi	Blytheville	55.73	89.69		I-55 / US 78 east – St. Louis, Memphis	Eastern end of US 78 concurrency; exit 67 on I-55
Mississippi	Blytheville				AR 151 south (South Promise Land Road)	Northern terminus of AR 151
Mississippi	Blytheville				AR 980 – Airport	
Mississippi					AR 312 east – Number Nine	Western terminus of AR 312
Mississippi					AR 137S north – Armorel	Southern terminus of AR 137S
Mississippi	Barfield	62.25	100.18		Mississippi River	Eastern terminus
1.000 mi = 1.609 km; 1.000 km = 0.621 mi: Concurrency terminus

== History ==
Highway 18 was created during the 1926 Arkansas state highway numbering from Diaz to Barfield similar to the present-day alignment. The designation was shifted onto Nettleton Cut-Off Road in Jonesboro on March 9, 1955. The highway was rerouted between Leachville and Manilla on July 10, 1957, with Highway 18 taking over the former alignment of Highway 18S. It was extended to the Mississippi River on April 24, 1963, as part of a major expansion of the state highway system.

== See also ==
- List of state highways in Arkansas
