= U.S. Route 78 in Arkansas =

Segment of U.S. Highway in Arkansas

U.S. Highway 78

Route information
- Maintained by ArDOT
- Length: 140.75 mi (226.52 km)
- Existed: 2023–present

Major junctions
- West end: I-57 / US 67 / AR 226 near Swifton
- US 49 / US 63 in from near Cash to Jonesboro; I-555 through Jonesboro; I-55 / US 61 / AR 18 in Blytheville; I-555 / US 61 / AR 77 in Turrell; US 64 in Marion; I-40 / US 79 through West Memphis; US 70 in West Memphis
- East end: I-55 / US 61 / US 64 / US 70 / US 78 / US 79 at the Tennessee state line in West Memphis

Location
- Country: United States
- State: Arkansas
- Counties: Craighead, Mississippi, Crittenden

Highway system
- United States Numbered Highway System; List; Special; Divided; Arkansas Highway System; Interstate; US; State; Business; Spurs; Suffixed; Scenic; Heritage
← AR 77	→ AR 78

U.S. Highway 78 (US 78) is an east–west highway in northeast Arkansas. The road largely runs concurrently with Interstate 55 (I-55) within the state.

== Route description ==
=== From Interstate 57 to Blytheville ===
US 78 begins at interchange with I-57/US 67 at exit 102 near Swifton where the roadway continues as AR 226 west toward Swifton. US 78/AR 226 then intersects Arkansas Highway 18 (AR 18) just south of the Cash Central Business District. The two highways then have an intersection with AR 349 southwest of Gilkerson before beginning to run concurrently with US 49 and US 63 east-northeast of Gibson. AR 226 then leaves US 49/US 63/US 78 in Jonesboro. Still in the city limits of Jonesboro, US 49/US 78 then meets I-555/AR 18; this is the point where US 63 splits from US 49/US 78, while US 49/US 78 begins to run concurrently with I-555. I-555/US 49/US 78 then intersects AR 1B (Harrisburg Road). I-555/US 78 then has an interchange in Jonesboro; it serves AR 1 (Stadium Boulevard/Red Wolf Boulevard) and Caraway Road. After meeting AR 463 and Nettleton Avenue, US 78 then splits from I-555 at exit 39. About 1.21 miles (1.95 km) down the road, US 78 meets AR 18 again, this time the two highways run concurrently to Blytheville.

US 78/AR 18 intersects AR 158 and AR 135 in Lake City. US 78/AR 18 then passes through the communities of Black Oak, Monette, Leachville, Manila, Wilson Junction, Dell, and finally Blytheville. In Blytheville, US 78/AR 18 intersects AR 151, US 61, AR 239, and I-55. At I-55, US 78 ends its concurrency with AR 18; US 78 travels concurrently with I-55 south to Memphis, Tennessee, while AR 18 continues straight towards Armorel.

=== From Blytheville to the Tennessee state line ===
US 78 travels concurrently with Interstate 55 (I-55) south, bypassing Osceola. In Turrell, the highways intersect I-555, US 61, and AR 77. US 61 joins the concurrency with I-55/US 78 and heads south to Marion and West Memphis, running parallel to AR 77. In Marion, US 64 joins the concurrency heading south.

In West Memphis, I-55/US 78/US 61/US 64 meets I-40/ and US 79, having arrived from Little Rock and Stuttgart in the west. The two Interstate Highways and four US Highways turn east-southeast and share a concurrency for 3.1 miles (5.0 km). Still within West Memphis, I-40 leaves and heads east to enter Memphis, Tennessee, via the Hernando de Soto Bridge. I-55/US 78/US 61/US 64/US 79 continues east-southeast, and US 70 meets and joins the concurrency as they leave the city.

I-55, US 78, and the other concurrent highways (US 61, US 64, US 79, and US 70) all cross the Mississippi River on the Memphis & Arkansas Bridge, entering Memphis.

== History ==
Prior to November 2023, US 78 formerly ended at US 64/US 70/US 79 (Second Street) in Memphis, Tennessee. On October 25, 2023, the Arkansas Highway Commission voted unanimously to extend the US 78 designation into northeast Arkansas. According to the Arkansas Department of Transportation (ARDOT), the US 78 designation would be extended along several other routes from its former western terminus in Memphis across the Memphis & Arkansas Bridge to its newer current western terminus near Swifton, Arkansas, at US 67 (before I-57 was designated at that time). The route would be cosigned along portions of US 64, US 70, US 79, I-55, US 61, I-40, AR 18, AR 18S, I-555, US 49, US 63, and AR 226. This extension of the US 78 route designation was seen as a way to boost economic growth in the region by assigning a single route number for travelers to follow. The extension was approved by the American Association of State Highway and Transportation Officials (AASHTO) in November 2023.

== Major intersections ==
County	Location	mi	km	Exit	Destinations	Notes
Craighead		0.00	0.00		I-57 / US 67 / AR 226 west – Swifton, St. Louis, Little Rock	Western terminus of US 78; western end of AR 226 concurrency; roadway continues as AR 226 westbound; AR 226 west is the former US 67 north; exit 102 on I-57/US 67
Craighead	Cash	5.0	8.0		AR 18 to AR 91 – Grubbs	
Craighead		11.0	17.7		AR 349 north to AR 91	
Craighead		12.4	20.0		US 49 south / US 63 – Waldenburg	Western end of US 49/US 63 concurrency
Craighead	Jonesboro	13.7	22.0		AR 226 east (Woodsprings Road)	Eastern end of AR 226 concurrency
Craighead	Jonesboro	18.5	29.8	45	I-555 north / US 63 north / AR 18 – Jonesboro	Eastern end of US 63 concurrency; western end of I-555 concurrency
Craighead	Jonesboro	19.5	31.4	44	AR 1B (Harrisburg Road)	
Craighead	Jonesboro	21.1	34.0	42	US 49 north / AR 1 (Stadium Boulevard / Red Wolf Boulevard) / Caraway Road – Jonesboro, Paragould	Eastern end of US 49 concurrency
Craighead	Jonesboro	22.9	36.9	40	AR 463 south (Nettleton Avenue)	Northern terminus of AR 463; Former US 63B.
Craighead	Jonesboro	23.7	38.1	39	I-555 south / AR 18S begins (Dr. Martin Luther King Drive) – Memphis	Eastern end of I-555 concurrency; southern terminus of AR 18S; western end of SR 18S concurrency
Craighead	Jonesboro	25.5	41.0		AR 18 west (Highland Avenue) / AR 18S ends (Dr. Martin Luther King Drive) – Memphis	Northern terminus of AR 18S; eastern end of AR 18S concurrency; western end of AR 18 concurrency
Craighead	Lake City	33.4	53.8		AR 158 west – Lunsford	Eastern terminus of AR 158
Craighead	Lake City	34.4	55.4		AR 135 north – Paragould	Southern terminus of AR 135
Craighead	Black Oak	39.3	63.2		AR 135 south – Caraway, Lepanto	Northern terminus of AR 135
Craighead	Monette	44.3	71.3		AR 139 north (Edmonds Street)	Southern terminus of AR 139
Craighead	Monette	46.1	74.2		AR 139 south – Caraway	Northern terminus of AR 139
Mississippi	Leachville	49.3	79.3		AR 119 north to AR 77 – Leachville	Southern terminus of AR 119
Mississippi	Manila	53.5	86.1		AR 18B east (West Lake Street) – Manila Business District	Western terminus of AR 18B; former AR 77
Mississippi	Manila	53.8	86.6		AR 77 north – Leachville	Western end of AR 77 concurrency
Mississippi	Manila	55.0	88.5		AR 77 south – Athelstan	Eastern end of AR 77 concurrency
Mississippi		61.2	98.5		AR 181 south – Victoria	Western end of AR 181 concurrency
Mississippi	Dell	63.5	102.2		AR 181 north – Dell Business District	Eastern end of AR 181 concurrency
Mississippi		65.3	105.1		AR 312 east	Western terminus of AR 312
Mississippi		70.9	114.1		AR 239 north – Half Moon	Southern terminus of AR 239
Mississippi	Blytheville	71.6	115.2		AR 151 north – Gosnell	Southern terminus of AR 151
Mississippi	Blytheville	72.2	116.2		US 61 (Division Street) to I-55 – Blytheville Business District	
Mississippi	Blytheville	73.8	118.8		AR 239 south (Ruddle Street)	Northern terminus of AR 239
Mississippi	Blytheville	75.0	120.7	67	I-55 north / AR 18 east – Armorel, St. Louis	Eastern end of SR 18 concurrency; western end of I-55 concurrency
see I-55 (mile 0.000–67.079)
Mississippi River		140.75	226.52		I-55 south / US 61 south / US 64 east / US 70 east / US 78 east / US 79 north / SR 1 east – Memphis, Jackson, MS	Continuation into Tennessee; western terminus of SR 1
1.000 mi = 1.609 km; 1.000 km = 0.621 mi: Concurrency terminus

== See also ==
U.S. Route 78
Previous state: Terminus	Arkansas	Next state: Tennessee
