= Arkansas Highway 135 =

State highway in Arkansas, United States

Highway 135

Route information
- Maintained by ArDOT
- Length: 69.67 mi (112.12 km)
- Existed: 1929–present

Major junctions
- South end: I-555 in Tyronza
- US 412 in Paragould; US 49 / AR 1 in Paragould
- North end: US 62 east of Corning

Location
- Country: United States
- State: Arkansas
- Counties: Poinsett, Craighead, Greene, Clay

Highway system
- Arkansas Highway System; Interstate; US; State; Business; Spurs; Suffixed; Scenic; Heritage
← AR 134	→ AR 136

Highway 135 (AR 135, Ark. 135, Hwy. 135) is a north–south state highway in northeast Arkansas. The route of 69.67 miles (112.12 km) runs from Interstate 555 (I-555) near Tyronza north through Paragould to US 62.

== Route description ==
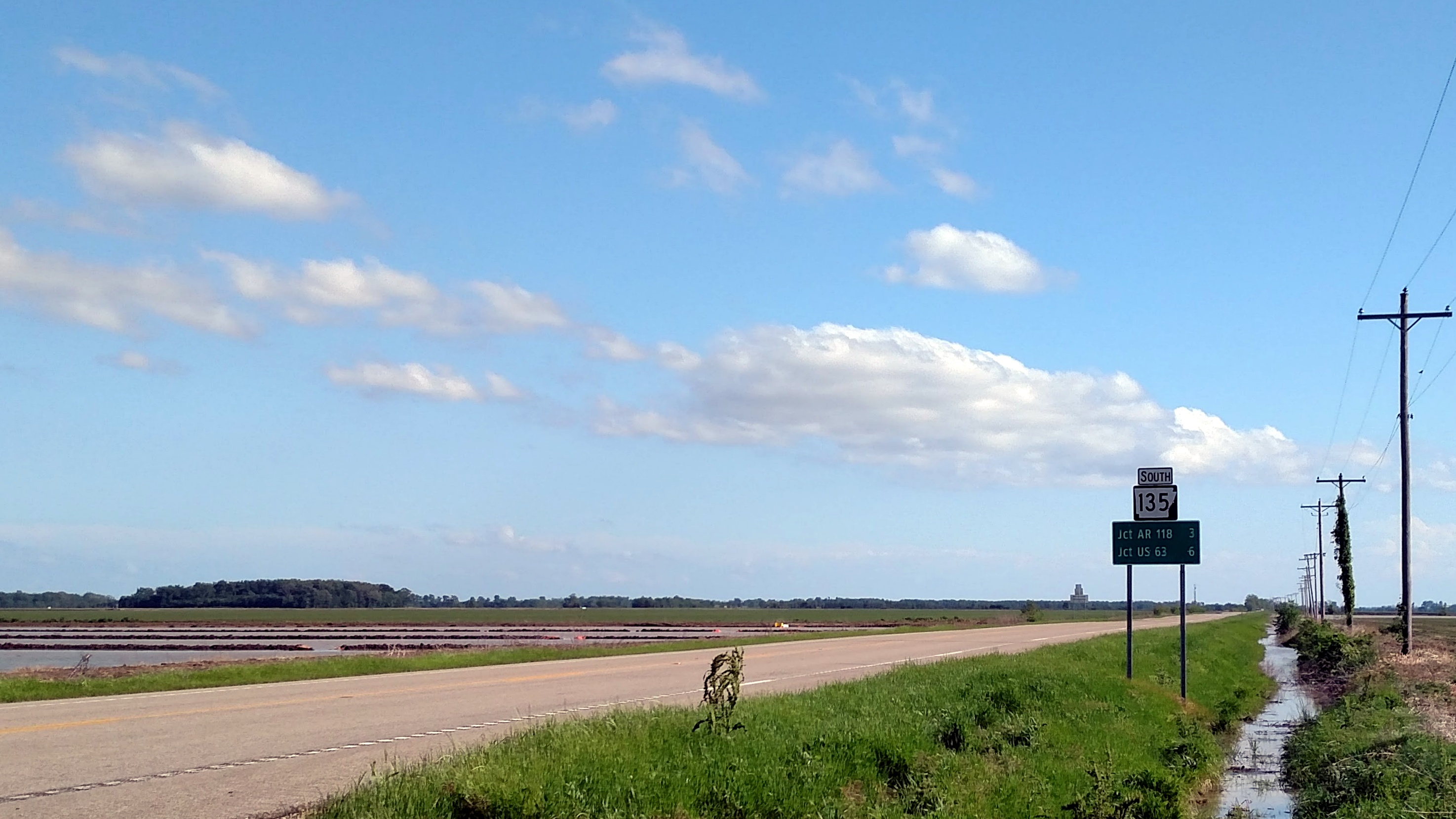
Highway 135 south of Lepanto

AR 135 begins at Interstate 555 south of Tyronza and runs north to intersect AR 118 before meeting AR 14/AR 140 in Lepanto. The route continues north to Caraway, where it meets concurs with AR 158. The concurrency ends in Black Oak, when AR 135 begins to arrow west with AR 18. The route leaves AR 18 in Lake City, after which it angles north to Paragould. In Paragould, AR 135 meets US 412 and US 49/AR 1 before exiting town headed north. The route meets AR 34 north of Oak Grove Heights, which it follows until Lafe. The route leaves AR 34 and shoots northwest to Hooker, where it meets AR 141. After Hooker, the route straightens north, meeting AR 90 for a brief concurrency before terminating at US 62 east of Corning.

== History ==
The section of Highway 135 north of Paragould was formerly Arkansas Highway 1W. Highway 1 was split into two directional routings in 1941, and when AR 1E became AR 1 in 1955, the former AR 1W from Paragould to Corning was designated Highway 135. The section south of Highway 18 was formerly Arkansas Highway 143, which became part of Arkansas Highway 135 in 1955. Arkansas Highway 143 has since been reassigned to another route.

== Major intersections ==
Mileage resets at some concurrencies.

County	Location	mi	km	Destinations	Notes
Poinsett	Tyronza	0.00– 0.15	0.00– 0.24	I-555 to I-55 – Jonesboro, West Memphis, St Louis	Southern terminus; I-555 exit 7
Poinsett		2.50	4.02	AR 118 – Tyronza, Joiner	
Poinsett	Spear Lake	5.00	8.05	AR 308 west – Marked Tree	Eastern terminus of AR 308
Poinsett	Lepanto	9.80	15.77	AR 140 to AR 14 east – Osceola, Marked Tree	
Poinsett		13.50	21.73	AR 136 east to AR 140	Western terminus of AR 136
Craighead	Caraway	21.23	34.17	AR 158 east – Caraway	Southern end of concurrency with AR 158
Craighead	Black Oak	27.63	44.47	AR 148 east to AR 139	Western terminus of AR 148
Craighead	Black Oak	28.25	45.46	US 78 east / AR 18 east – Monette	Southern end of concurrency with AR 18
Craighead	Lake City	0.00	0.00	US 78 east / AR 18 east / AR 158 west – Jonesboro	Northern end of concurrency with US 78/AR 18/AR 158
Craighead	Dixie	7.10	11.43	AR 230 west to US 49B	
Greene	Paragould	16.64	26.78	US 412 east – Cardwell, MO	Southern end of councurrency with US 412
Greene	Paragould			US 412 west – Jonesboro	Northern end of councurrency with US 412; southern end of concurrency with US 412B
Greene	Paragould			AR 69 south (South 2nd Avenue)	Northern terminus of AR 69
Greene	Paragould			US 49B south / US 412B west	Northern end of concurrency with US 412B; southern end of concurrency with US 49B
Greene	Paragould	0.00	0.00	US 49B north	Northern end of concurrency with US 49B
Greene	Paragould	0.50	0.80	US 49 / AR 1 – Jonesboro, Rector	
Greene	Oak Grove Heights	5.70	9.17	AR 34 west – Delaplaine, Beech Grove	Southern end of concurrency with AR 34
Greene	Lafe	9.90	15.93	AR 34 east – Marmaduke	Northern end of concurrency with AR 34
Greene	Hooker	12.00	19.31	AR 141 – Beech Grove, Knob	
Clay		18.78	30.22	AR 90 west – Knobel	Southern end of concurrnecy with AR 90
Clay		19.78	31.83	AR 90 east – Boydsville	Northern end of concurrnecy with AR 90
Clay		24.62	39.62	US 62 – Corning, Piggott	Northern terminus
1.000 mi = 1.609 km; 1.000 km = 0.621 mi: Concurrency terminus

== See also ==
- List of state highways in Arkansas
