= Arkansas Highway 148 =

Highway in Arkansas

Highway 148

Route information
- Maintained by ArDOT

Section 1
- Length: 4.61 mi (7.42 km)
- West end: AR 151 near Blytheville
- East end: Mississippi River levee near Blytheville

Section 2
- Length: 8.81 mi (14.18 km)
- West end: AR 181 near Dell
- Major intersections: I-55 in Burdette
- East end: US 61 in Burdette

Section 3
- Length: 3.53 mi (5.68 km)
- West end: AR 135 in Black Oak
- East end: AR 139

Location
- Country: United States
- State: Arkansas

Highway system
- Arkansas Highway System; Interstate; US; State; Business; Spurs; Suffixed; Scenic; Heritage
← AR 147	→ AR 149

Highway 148 (AR 148, Ark. 148, and Hwy. 148) is a designation for three east–west state highways in the Upper Arkansas Delta. One route of 4.61 miles (7.42 km) begins at Highway 239 and runs east to a Mississippi River levee. A second route of 8.81 miles (14.18 km) begins at Highway 181 and runs east to US Highway 61 (US 61) in Burdette. A third route of 3.53 miles (5.68 km) begins at Highway 135 in Black Oak and runs east to Highway 139. All routes are maintained by the Arkansas State Highway and Transportation Department (AHTD).

== Route description ==
=== Highway 239 to Mississippi River ===
AR 148 begins at the southern terminus of AR 239, heads east past the southern terminus of AR 151 and ends at a Mississippi River levee.

=== Highway 181 to Burdette ===
It begins heading east from an intersection with AR 181 through very rural farmlands until it enters Burdette town limits as it interchanges with I-55's Exit 57. After winding through some curves in downtown Burdette, it ends at an unsignalized intersection with US 61.

=== Black Oak to Highway 139 ===
The highway begins at Highway 135 (Main St) in Black Oak south of downtown. Highway 148 runs due east as a section line road to Highway 139 in eastern Craighead County near the Mississippi County line.

== Major junctions ==
County	Location	mi	km	Destinations	Notes
Mississippi		0.00	0.00	AR 239 north	
Mississippi		3.52	5.66	AR 151 north	
Mississippi		4.61	7.42	Mississippi River levee	End of state maintenance
Mississippi	Gap in route				
Mississippi		0.00	0.00	AR 181	
Mississippi	Burdette	5.81	9.35	I-55 – Blytheville, Memphis	Exit 57 (I-55)
Mississippi	Burdette	8.81	14.18	US 61 – Blytheville, Osceola	
Craighead	Black Oak	0.00	0.00	AR 135	
Craighead		3.53	5.68	AR 139	
1.000 mi = 1.609 km; 1.000 km = 0.621 mi

== See also ==
- List of state highways in Arkansas
