= List of places in Arkansas: U =

Arkansas State Seal

This list of current cities, towns, unincorporated communities, and other recognized places in the U.S. state of Arkansas whose name begins with the letter U. It also includes information on the number and names of counties in which the place lies, and its lower and upper zip code bounds, if applicable.

== Cities and Towns ==
Name of place	Number of counties	Principal county	Lower zip code	Upper zip code
Ulm	1	Prairie County	72170	
Umpire	1	Howard County	71971	
Unco	1	Calhoun County		
Union	1	Fulton County	72576	
Union	1	Logan County		
Union	1	Sevier County	71832	
Union	1	Union County	71765	
Union	1	Woodruff County		
Unionhill	1	Independence County	72020	
Union Hill	1	Independence County		
Union Hill	1	Scott County	72866	
Union Ridge	1	Sebastian County	72927	
Uniontown	1	Crawford County	72955	
Union Valley	1	Lonoke County		
Unity	1	Greene County		
University	1	Washington County	72701	
Uno	1	Poinsett County	72479	
Urbana	1	Union County	71768	
Urbanette	1	Carroll County	72616	
Ursula	1	Sebastian County	72933	

== Townships ==
Name of place	Number of counties	Principal county	Lower zip code	Upper zip code
Umpire Township	1	Howard County		
Union Township	1	Ashley County		
Union Township	1	Baxter County		
Union Township	1	Conway County		
Union Township	1	Crawford County		
Union Township	1	Faulkner County		
Union Township	1	Fulton County		
Union Township	1	Garland County		
Union Township	1	Greene County		
Union Township	1	Independence County		
Union Township	1	Izard County		
Union Township	1	Jackson County		
Union Township	1	Lee County		
Union Township	1	Marion County		
Union Township	1	Nevada County		
Union Township	1	Newton County		
Union Township	1	Ouachita County		
Union Township	1	Perry County		
Union Township	1	Prairie County		
Union Township	1	Randolph County		
Union Township	1	Saline County		
Union Township	1	Stone County		
Union Township	1	Van Buren County		
Union Township	1	White County		
Uniontown Township	1	Crawford County		
Union Valley Township	1	Perry County		
Upper Township	1	Crawford County		
Upper Township	1	Sebastian County		
Upper North Township	1	Sharp County		
Upper Surrounded Hill Township	1	Prairie County		
