= Auxiliary routes of Arkansas Highway 18 =

State highway in Arkansas, United States

Three auxiliary routes of Arkansas Highway 18 exist in Northeast Arkansas, with one former alignment.

== Newport spur ==
Highway 18S
- Location: Newport Municipal Airport
- Length: 1.00 mi (1.61 km)

Arkansas Highway 18 Spur is a spur route that runs to Newport Municipal Airport. The route is 1.00 mile (1.61 km) in length, and two-lane, undivided.

Major intersections

The entire route is in Jackson County.

Location	mi	km	Destinations	Notes
Newport	1.00	1.61	AR 980 (Victory Boulevard) – Airport	Western terminus
	0.0	0.0	AR 18	Eastern terminus
1.000 mi = 1.609 km; 1.000 km = 0.621 mi

== Jonesboro spur ==
Highway 18S
- Location: Jonesboro
- Length: 1.21 mi (1.95 km)

Arkansas Highway 18 Spur is a spur route in Jonesboro known as Dr. Martin Luther King Jr. Drive. The route is 1.12 miles (1.80 km) in length, connecting Highway 18 to I-555. Dr. Martin Luther King Jr. Drive is two-lane undivided. Its entire length is concurrent with U.S. Route 78 (US 78).

Major intersections

The entire route is in Jonesboro, Craighead County.

mi	km	Destinations	Notes
0.0	0.0	I-555 / US 78 west – Memphis	Western terminus; western end of US 78 concurrency; I-555 exit 39
1.21	1.95	US 78 east / AR 18 – Blytheville	Eastern terminus; eastern end of US 78 concurrency
1.000 mi = 1.609 km; 1.000 km = 0.621 mi: Concurrency terminus

== Manila business route ==
Highway 18S
- Location: Manila
- Length: 0.349 mi (562 m)
- Existed: March 7, 1962–present

Arkansas Highway 18 Business is a business route in the small town of Manila. It connects US 78 and Highway 18 to Highway 77 (Beauchamp Street).

History

The Arkansas State Highway Commission created Highway 18B on March 7, 1962 from a former alignment of Highway 77 through downtown Manila. It was redesignated along another former alignment of Highway 77 on June 23, 1965, now running along West Lake Street.

Major intersections

The entire route is in Manila, Mississippi County.

mi	km	Destinations	Notes
0.000	0.000	US 78 / AR 18	Western terminus
0.349	0.562	AR 77 (Beauchamp Street)	Eastern terminus
1.000 mi = 1.609 km; 1.000 km = 0.621 mi

== Mississippi County spur route ==
Highway 18S
- Location: Mississippi County, Arkansas
- Length: 5 mi (8.0 km)
- Existed: 1948–1957

Arkansas Highway 18 Spur is a former spur route between Leachville and Manila in Mississippi County, Arkansas.

Major intersections

The entire route was in Mississippi County.

Location	mi	km	Destinations	Notes
Manila	5	8.0	AR 18	Southern terminus
Leachville	0	0.0	AR 18	Northern terminus
1.000 mi = 1.609 km; 1.000 km = 0.621 mi
