= Arkansas Highway 139 =

Highway in Arkansas

Highway 139

Route information
- Maintained by ArDOT

Section 1
- Length: 17.65 mi (28.40 km)
- South end: AR 158 in Caraway
- Major intersections: US 78 / AR 18 in Monette
- North end: Route F at Missouri state line in Childress

Section 2
- Length: 34.86 mi (56.10 km)
- South end: US 412 near Paragould
- Major intersections: US 62 from Piggott to Pollard
- North end: Route 51 at the Missouri state line in Fagus, MO

Location
- Country: United States
- State: Arkansas
- Counties: Craighead, Greene, Clay

Highway system
- Arkansas Highway System; Interstate; US; State; Business; Spurs; Suffixed; Scenic; Heritage
← AR 138	→ AR 140

Highway 139 (AR 139, Ark. 139, and Hwy. 139) is a designation for two north–south state highways in the Upper Arkansas Delta. One route of 17.65 miles (28.40 km) begins at Highway 158 in Caraway and runs north to Missouri Supplemental Route F at the Missouri state line. A second route of 34.86 miles (56.10 km) runs from US Highway 412 (US 412) to Missouri Route 51 at the Missouri state line. Both routes are maintained by the Arkansas State Highway and Transportation Department (AHTD).

== Route description ==
=== Caraway to Missouri ===
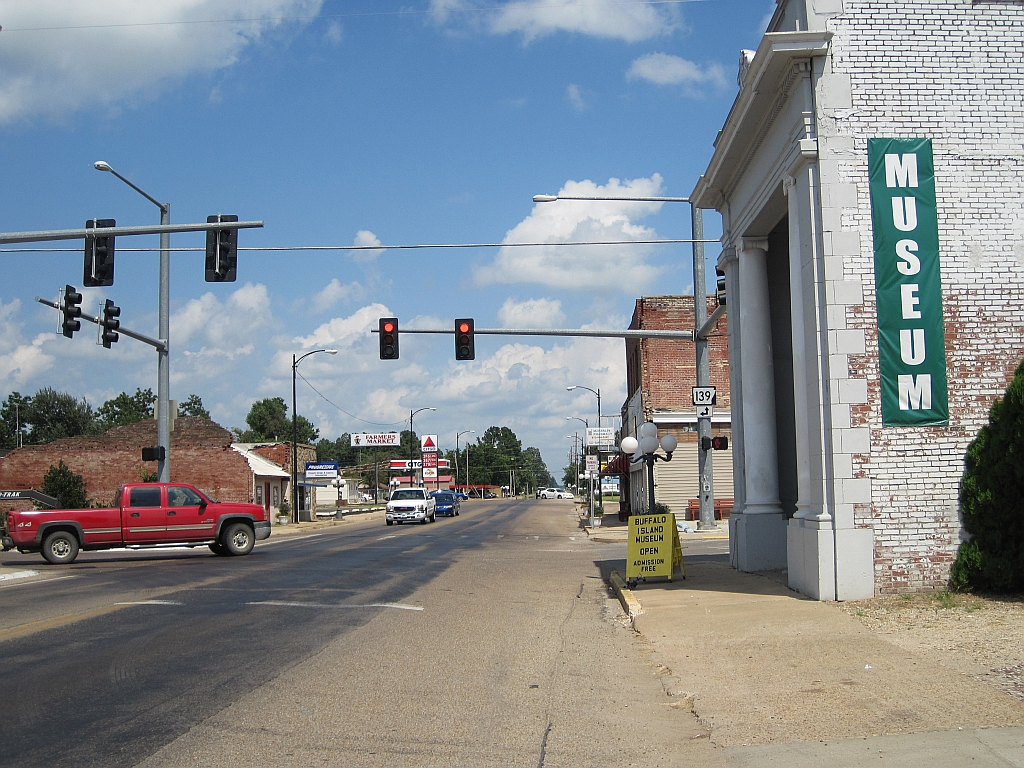
Highway 139 turns north onto Drew Avenue in Monette

AR 139 begins in Caraway at AR 158. The route runs north to AR 18 in Monette. AR 139 continues north to the Missouri state line to terminate at MO-SSR-F.

=== Brighton to Missouri ===
Arkansas Highway 139 is a state highway of 44.7 miles (71.9 km) in Greene and Clay Counties. The route lies close to the St. Francis River in low, flat ground dedicated largely to cotton growing where it isn't swampy.

AR 139 begins at US 412 near Brighton. The route then runs north through rural Greene County until meeting and concurring with AR 90 for a brief period east. AR 139 continues north to meet US 62/AR 1 east of Piggott. AR 139 runs with AR 1 through Piggott and with US 62 to Pollard.

After Pollard, AR 139 runs straight north to the Missouri state line, terminating at Route 51 south of Fagus, Missouri.

== Major intersections ==
County	Location	mi	km	Destinations	Notes
Craighead	Caraway	0.00	0.00	AR 158 (State St) – Black Oak, Lepanto	Southern terminus
Craighead		5.93	9.54	AR 148 west – Black Oak	
Craighead	Monette	10.37	16.69	US 78 east / AR 18 east – Manila	Southern terminus of AR 18/US 78 concurrency
Craighead	Monette			US 78 west / AR 18 west / AR 18B begins – Black Oak, Jonesboro	Northern terminus of AR 18/US 78 concurrency
Craighead	Monette			AR 18B west (Drew Ave)	Northern terminus of AR 18B concurrency
Craighead	Monette			US 78 / AR 18	
Craighead		7.28	11.72	Route F – Cardwell	Northern terminus; Missouri border
Gap in route
Greene		0.00	0.00	US 412 – Cardwell MO, Paragould	Southern terminus
Greene	Fritz	11.93	19.20	AR 34 west – Marmaduke	
Clay		13.92	22.40	AR 119 north – Rector	
Clay		21.87	35.20	AR 90 west to US 49 – Rector, Paragould	Southern terminus of AR 90 concurrency
Clay		0.00	0.00	AR 90 east – Kennett MO	Northern terminus of AR 90 concurrency
Clay		8.46	13.62	US 62 east / AR 1 north – St. Francis, Holcomb MO	Southern terminus of US 62 concurrency
Clay	Pollard	0.00	0.00	US 62 west – McDougal, Corning	Northern terminus of US 62 concurrency
Clay		4.53	7.29	Route 51 – Qulin	Northern terminus; Missouri border
1.000 mi = 1.609 km; 1.000 km = 0.621 mi: Concurrency terminus
