= Arkansas Highway 181 =

State highway in Arkansas, United States

Highway 181

Route information
- Maintained by ArDOT

Section 1
- Length: 2.44 mi (3.93 km)
- South end: US 61 in Bassett
- North end: I-55 near Bassett

Section 2
- Length: 31.19 mi (50.20 km)
- South end: AR 14 in Marie
- North end: Route NN at the Missouri state line near Gosnell

Location
- Country: United States
- State: Arkansas
- Counties: Mississippi

Highway system
- Arkansas Highway System; Interstate; US; State; Business; Spurs; Suffixed; Scenic; Heritage
← AR 180	→ AR 182

Highway 181 (AR 181, Ark. 181, and Hwy. 181) is a designation for five segments of state highways in Mississippi County. A western route of 2.24 miles (3.60 km) runs from U.S. Route 61 (US 61) in Bassett to Interstate 55 (I-55). A second route, consisting of four segments connected by other state highways, of a total length of 31.19 miles (50.20 km) begins at Highway 14 in Marie and runs north to Missouri SSR-NN.

== Route description ==
=== Bassett to I-55 ===
Highway 181 begins at US 61 in Bassett and runs west to Interstate 55. This highway segment does not have any junctions with other state highways.

=== Marie to Missouri ===
Highway 181 runs north from Highway 14 in Marie to cross Interstate 55. The route meets Highway 140 north of Keiser and Highway 158 near Victoria. A brief concurrency begins with Highway 18 near Dell. The highway passes the Widner-Magers Farm Historic District and continues north then east at Woodland Corner. Highway 181 next turns southeast with Highway 151 into Gosnell. The route then turns north to terminate at MO-SSR-NN at the Missouri state line.

== Major intersections ==
Mile markers reset at concurrencies. The entire route is in Mississippi County.

Location	mi	km	Destinations	Notes
Bassett	0.00	0.00	US 61 – Joiner, Wilson, Osceola	Southern terminus
	2.44	3.93	I-55 – Blytheville, Memphis	Northern terminus
Highway 181 begins at Marie
Marie	0.00	0.00	AR 14 – Wilson, Lepanto	Southern terminus
	2.16	3.48	I-55 – Blytheville, Memphis	
Pace	6.08	9.78	AR 140 west – Lepanto	
AR 140 concurrency east, 1.5 miles (2.4 km)
	0.00	0.00	AR 140 east – Osceola	
	4.02	6.47	AR 158 – Luxora	
	8.05	12.96	AR 148 east to I-55 – Burdette	AR 148 eastern terminus
Wilson Junction	10.23	16.46	US 78 west / AR 18 west – Manila, Jonesboro	
US 78 / AR 18 concurrency east, 2.0 miles (3.2 km)
Dell	0.00	0.00	US 78 east / AR 18 east – Blytheville	
Half Moon	4.15	6.68	AR 239 north – Blytheville	AR 239 southern terminus
Calumet	12.03	19.36	AR 151 north – Kennett MO	
AR 151 concurrency south, 2.0 miles (3.2 km)
Gosnell	0.00	0.00	AR 151 south (Air Base Highway)	
	2.09	3.36	AR 150 east – Yarbro	AR 150 western terminus
	2.85	4.59	Route NN	Northern terminus
1.000 mi = 1.609 km; 1.000 km = 0.621 mi: Concurrency terminus
