= Interstate 55 in Arkansas =

Section of highway in Arkansas, US

Interstate 55
- I-55 highlighted in red

Route information
- Maintained by ArDOT
- Length: 72.22 mi (116.23 km)
- Existed: 1957–present
- NHS: Entire route

Major junctions
- South end: I-55 / US 61 / US 64 / US 70 / US 78 / US 79 / SR 1 at the Tennessee state line in West Memphis
- US 70 in West Memphis; I-40 / US 79 in West Memphis; US 64 in Marion; I-555 / US 61 / AR 77 in Turrell; US 61 in Blytheville; US 78 / AR 18 in Blytheville
- North end: I-55 at the Missouri state line in Blytheville

Location
- Country: United States
- State: Arkansas
- Counties: Crittenden, Mississippi

Highway system
- Interstate Highway System; Main; Auxiliary; Suffixed; Business; Future; Arkansas Highway System; Interstate; US; State; Business; Spurs; Suffixed; Scenic; Heritage
| ← AR 54 | → AR 56 |

Interstate 55 (I-55) is a north–south Interstate Highway that has a 72.22-mile (116.23 km) section in the US state of Arkansas connecting sections in Tennessee and Missouri. The route enters Arkansas on the Memphis & Arkansas Bridge over the Mississippi River from Memphis, Tennessee. It travels northward through northeast Arkansas, connecting the cities of West Memphis and Blytheville. I-55 continues into Missouri heading to St. Louis, Missouri. The highway overlaps I-40 in West Memphis and has a junction with I-555, a spur route to Jonesboro, in Turrell. For the majority of its routing through Arkansas, I-55 generally follows U.S. Highway 61 (US 61) and has a 67.08-mile (107.95 km) long concurrency with US 78 from the Tennessee state line in Memphis to Blytheville for most of its length.

== Route description ==
=== Mississippi River to Turrell ===
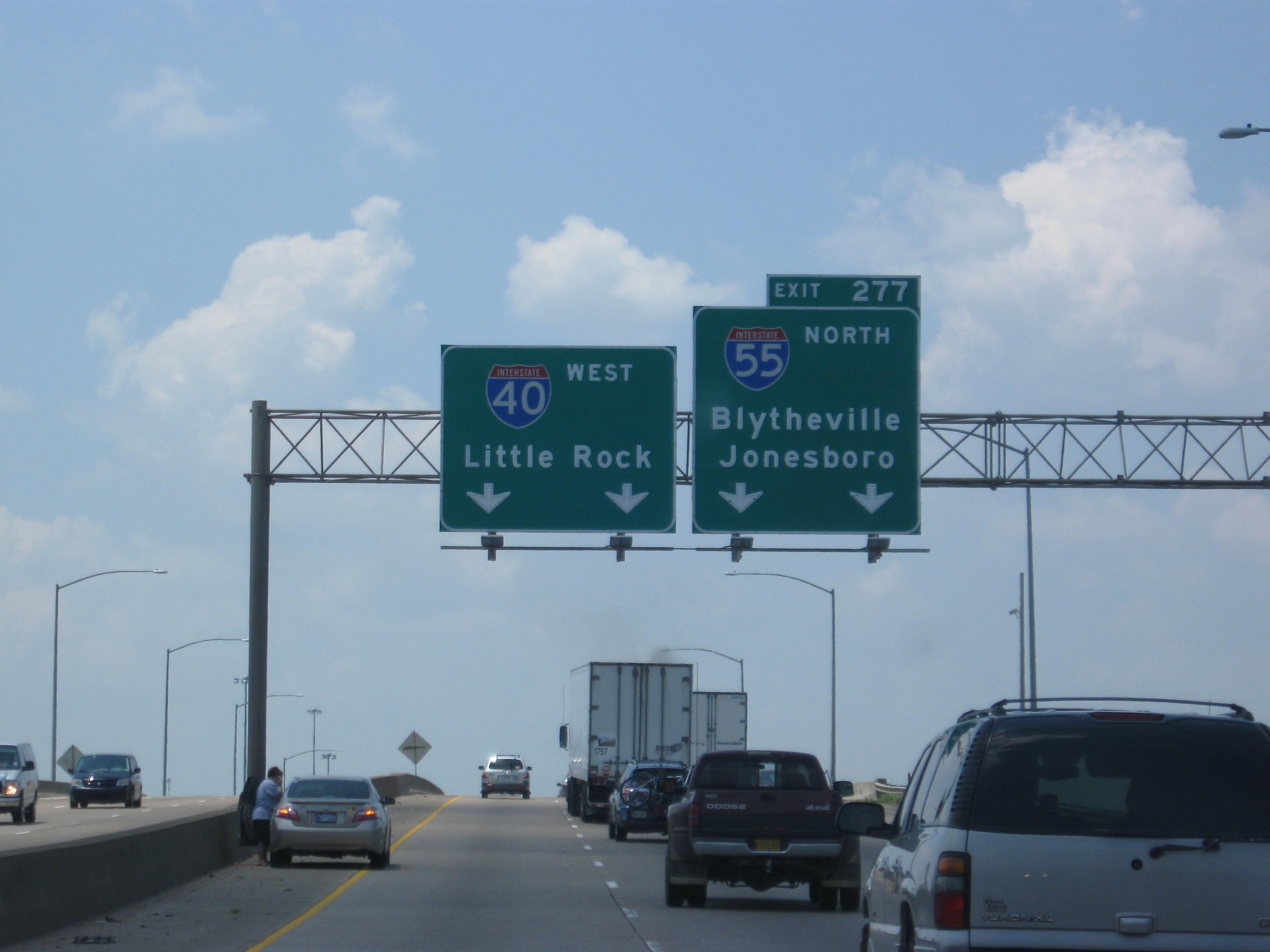
I-55 splits from I-40 in West Memphis.

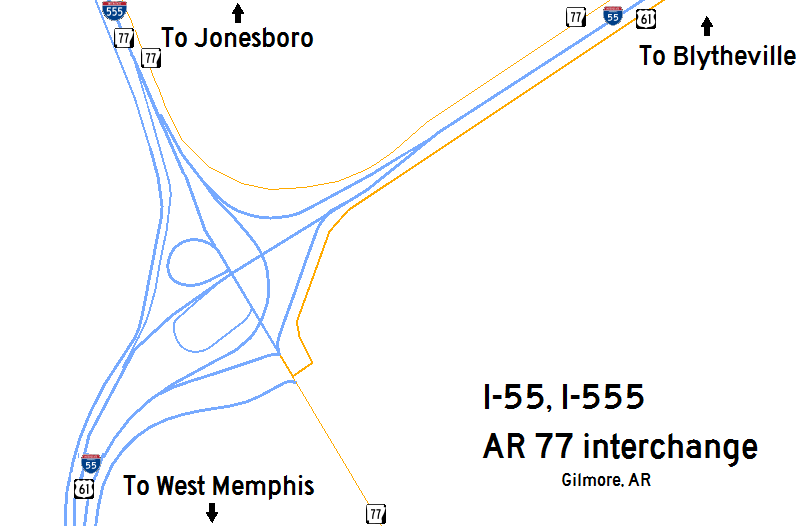
Diagram of Lake David Interchange

I-55 enters Arkansas from Memphis, Tennessee, on the Memphis & Arkansas Bridge over the Mississippi River, sharing the bridge with US 61/US 64/US 70/US 78/US 79. Shortly after entering the state, the highway enters West Memphis, where US 70 exits the route and becomes Broadway Avenue. I-55/US 61/US 64/US 78/US 79 form a concurrency with I-40 at exit 5, an overlap that lasts 3.1 miles (5.0 km). The highways split at I-40 exit 277, with I-40/US 79 continuing west to Little Rock and I-55/US 61/US 64/US 78 running north into Marion. US 64 exits I-55/US 61/US 78 in Marion, continuing west as Old Military Road toward Wynne. I-55 continues to run through farmlands of the Arkansas Delta, paralleling Highway 77 (AR 77) until Turrell.

=== Turrell to Missouri state line ===
In Turrell, I-55/US 61/US 78 meets the southern terminus of I-555, a spur route of I-55 connecting Jonesboro to the Interstate Highway System. I-555 run north to Jonesboro, while AR 77 and US 61 become frontage roads for I-55/US 78. Slightly east of this junction, these frontage roads depart I-55/US 78, with AR 77 running near Birdsong and US 61 serving Wilson. I-55/US 78 runs northeast to enter Mississippi County, having junctions with AR 118 to Joiner, AR 181 to Bassett, AR 14 near Marie, and AR 181 near Keiser. In Osceola, the route has a junction with AR 140 near Osceola Municipal Airport. I-55/US 78 continues northeast, intersecting minor state highways in rural Mississippi County before a junction with US 61 in south Blytheville. US 78 departs from I-55 where it intersects AR 18 in Blytheville before exiting town headed due north. The route has a junction with AR 150 just before crossing the Missouri state line.

== Exit list ==
| County | Location | mi | km | Exit | Destinations | Notes |
|---|---|---|---|---|---|---|
| Mississippi River | | 0.00 | 0.00 | | I-55 south / US 61 south / US 64 east / US 70 east / US 78 east / US 79 north / SR 1 east – Memphis, Jackson MS | Continuation into Tennessee |
| Mississippi River | | 0.72 | 1.16 | Memphis & Arkansas Bridge | | |
| Crittenden | West Memphis | 1.066 | 1.716 | 1 | Bridgeport Road | |
| Crittenden | West Memphis | 2.831 | 4.556 | 3A | AR 131 (Mound City Road) | Northbound exit only |
| Crittenden | West Memphis | 3.100 | 4.989 | 3B | US 70 west (Broadway Boulevard) – West Memphis | Northbound exit and southbound entrance; northern end of US 70 concurrency |
| Crittenden | West Memphis | 3.603 | 5.798 | 4 | Dr. Martin Luther King Jr. Drive (AR 38) to Southland Drive | Southland Drive not signed southbound |
| Crittenden | West Memphis | 4.766 | 7.670 | 279B | I-40 east – Memphis, Nashville | Southbound exit and northbound entrance; southern end of I-40 concurrency |
| Crittenden | West Memphis | 4.779 | 7.691 | 279A (SB); 5 (NB) | Ingram Boulevard | |
| Crittenden | West Memphis | 5.246 | 8.443 | 278 | AR 77 (Missouri Street) / AR 191 north (7th Street) | AR 77/Missouri Street not signed southbound |
| Crittenden | West Memphis | 7.088– 7.513 | 11.407– 12.091 | 277 (NB); 8 (SB) | I-40 west / US 79 south – Little Rock, Forrest City | Northern end of I-40/US 79 concurrency |
| Crittenden | West Memphis | 7.088– 7.513 | 11.407– 12.091 | 7 | AR 77 (Missouri Street) | Southbound exit and northbound entrance |
| Crittenden | Marion | 9.819 | 15.802 | 10 | US 64 west (Military Road) – Marion, Sunset, Wynne | Northern end of US 64 concurrency |
| Crittenden | | 13.549 | 21.805 | 14 | CR 4 – Jericho | |
| Crittenden | | 16.829 | 27.084 | 17 | AR 50 – Clarkedale | |
| Crittenden | | 21.219 | 34.149 | 21 | AR 42 – Turrell | |
| Crittenden | Turrell | 23.189 | 37.319 | 23 | I-555 north / US 61 north / AR 77 – Marked Tree, Jonesboro, Turrell | Northern end of US 61 concurrency; signed as exits 23B (AR 77 south) and 23A (I-555/AR 77 north) southbound; US 61 not signed southbound; southern terminus and exits 1B-A on I-555 |
| Mississippi | | 33.249 | 53.509 | 34 | AR 118 / AR 297 south – Joiner, Tyronza | |
| Mississippi | | 35.279 | 56.776 | 36 | AR 181 – Bassett, Wilson | |
| Mississippi | | 41.099 | 66.142 | 41 | AR 14 – Lepanto, Marie | |
| Mississippi | | 43.619 | 70.198 | 44 | AR 181 – Keiser, Wilson | |
| Mississippi | | 48.039 | 77.311 | 48 | AR 140 – Osceola, Etowah | |
| Mississippi | | 52.619 | 84.682 | 53 | AR 158 – Victoria, Luxora | |
| Mississippi | | 57.179 | 92.021 | 57 | AR 148 – Burdette, Wilson Junction | |
| Mississippi | Blytheville | 63.049 | 101.468 | 63 | US 61 to AR 312 west – Blytheville, Dell | |
| Mississippi | Blytheville | 67.079 | 107.953 | 67 | US 78 west / AR 18 – Blytheville, Armorel | Northern end of US 78 concurrency |
| Mississippi | | 71.059 | 114.358 | 71 | AR 150 – Yarbro, Gosnell | No northbound entrance; access to Arkansas International Airport |
| Mississippi | | | | 72 | State Line Road | Northbound exit and entrance |
| Mississippi | | 71.969 | 115.823 | | I-55 north – St. Louis | Continuation into Missouri |
1.000 mi = 1.609 km; 1.000 km = 0.621 mi: Concurrency terminus; Incomplete access

Interstate 55
| Previous state: Tennessee | Arkansas | Next state: Missouri |
