= Widner–Magers Farm Historic District =

Historic district in Arkansas, United States

- U.S. National Register of Historic Places
- U.S. Historic district
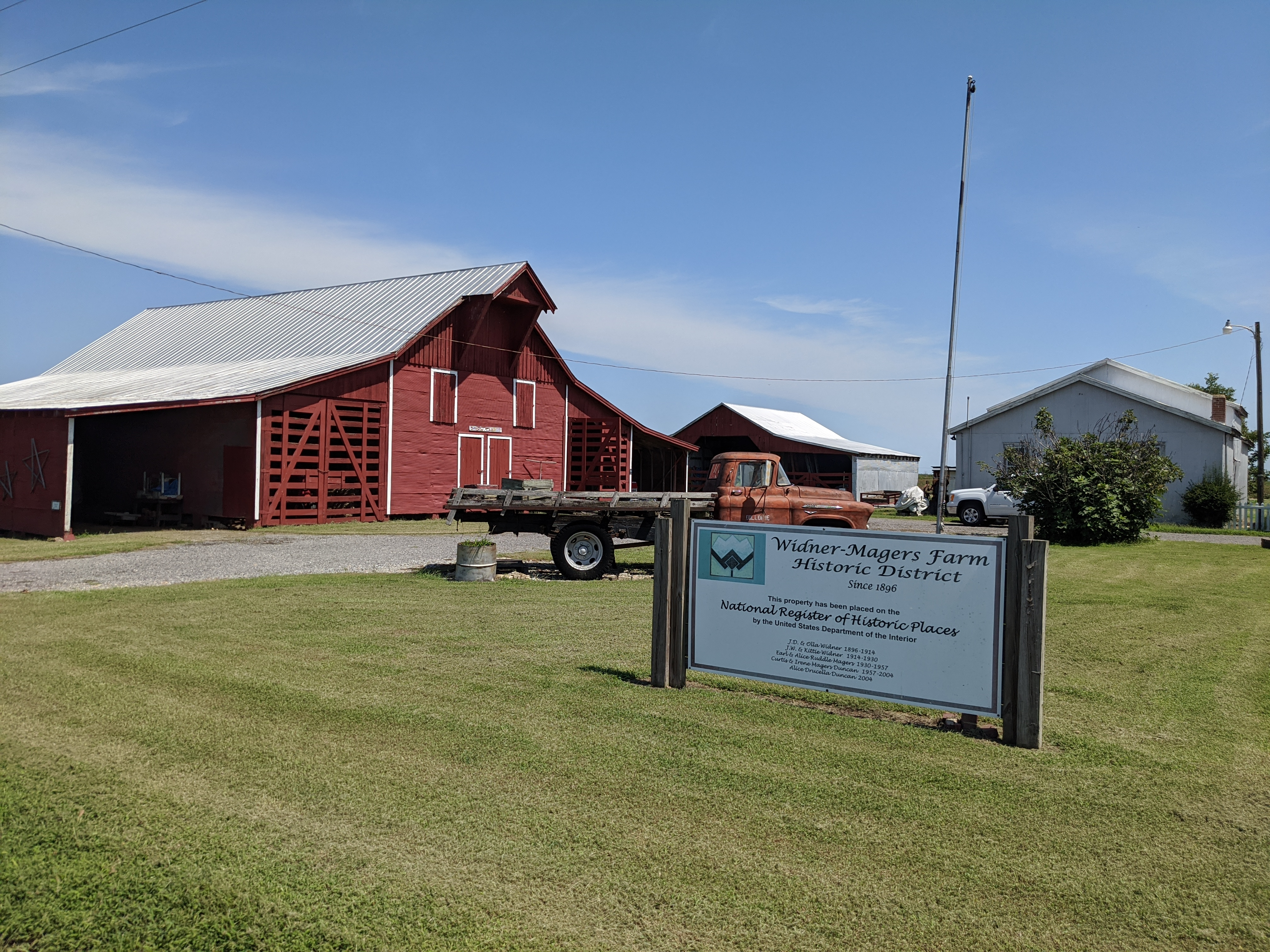

- Location within Arkansas Location within the United States
- Location: 3398 AR N St. 181, Dell, Arkansas
- Coordinates: 35°52′41″N 90°2′38″W
- Area: 1.3 acres (0.53 ha)
- Built: 1912
- Architectural style: Plain-Traditional
- MPS: Cotton and Rice Farm History and Architecture in the Arkansas Delta MPS
- NRHP reference No.: 06001325
- Added to NRHP: January 29, 2007

The Widner–Magers Farm is a historic farm property in rural Mississippi County, Arkansas. It is located at 3398 Arkansas North Highway 181, north of the town of Dell. The farmstead is set on a parcel of 1.3 acres (0.53 ha), surrounded by about 100 acres (40 ha) of land generally cultivated in cotton. The farmstead includes a number of historically significant agricultural outbuildings, built between the 1910s and 1930s, as well as a heavily altered 1930s farmhouse. The property is a fine local example of a subsistence-level cotton farming operation from the era of the Great Depression, and was listed on the National Register of Historic Places in 2007.

== See also ==
- National Register of Historic Places listings in Mississippi County, Arkansas
