= Cash, Arkansas =

- City
- Location of Cash in Craighead County, Arkansas.
- Coordinates: 35°48′04″N 90°55′54″W
- Country: United States
- State: Arkansas
- County: Craighead

Area
  - Total: 0.37 sq mi (0.95 km^{2})
  - Land: 0.37 sq mi (0.95 km^{2})
  - Water: 0 sq mi (0.00 km^{2})
- Elevation: 249 ft (76 m)

Population (2020)
  - Total: 280
  - Estimate (2025): 280
  - Density: 762.6/sq mi (294.43/km^{2})
- Time zone: UTC−6 (Central (CST))
  - Summer (DST): UTC−5 (CDT)
- ZIP Code: 72421
- Area code: 870
- FIPS code: 05-11920
- GNIS feature ID: 2406234

Cash is a city in western Craighead County, Arkansas, United States. The population was 280 at the 2020 census. Cash's population was of mostly white with 99.8% and partial Puerto Rican ethnicity. It is included in the Jonesboro, Arkansas Metropolitan Statistical Area.

The name "Cash" is a corruption of the Cache River.

== Geography ==
According to the United States Census Bureau, the town has a total area of 1.0 km^{2} (0.39 sq mi), all land.

=== List of highways ===
- US 78
- Highway 18
- Highway 226

== Demographics ==
Historical population
Census	Pop.	Note	%±
1940	186		—
1950	188		1.1%
1960	141		−25.0%
1970	265		87.9%
1980	285		7.5%
1990	214		−24.9%
2000	294		37.4%
2010	342		16.3%
2020	280		−18.1%
2025 (est.)	280	Steady	0.0%
U.S. Decennial Census; 2014 Estimate

As of the census of 2010, there were 342 people, 120 households, and 90 families residing in the town. The population density was 306.8 people/km^{2} (795 people/mi^{2}). There were 141 housing units at an average density of 147.1 units/km^{2} (381 units/mi^{2}). The racial makeup of the town was 98.98% White, 0.68% Black or African American and 0.34% Asian. 0.68% of the population were Hispanic or Latino of any race.

There were 120 households, out of which 29.2% had children under the age of 18 living with them, 53.3% were married couples living together, 15.0% had a female householder with no husband present, and 25.0% were non-families. 24.2% of all households were made up of individuals, and 12.5% had someone living alone who was 65 years of age or older. The average household size was 2.45 and the average family size was 2.87.

In the town, the population was spread out, with 25.5% under the age of 18, 9.2% from 18 to 24, 26.5% from 25 to 44, 21.4% from 45 to 64, and 17.3% who were 65 years of age or older. The median age was 34 years. For every 100 females, there were 93.4 males. For every 100 females age 18 and over, there were 90.4 males.

The median income for a household in the town was $22,500, and the median income for a family was $24,722. Males had a median income of $26,136 versus $17,188 for females. The per capita income for the town was $11,888. About 10.0% of families and 17.8% of the population were below the poverty line, including 31.1% of those under the age of 18 and 8.3% of those 65 or over.

== Notable people ==
- Carolina Cotton (A.K.A. the Yodeling Blonde Bombshell) best known for her unique style of Western Swing yodeling in the 1940s and 1950s.

== Education ==
Cash residents are served by the Westside Consolidated School District. The district opened in 1966 after the Cash School District merged into it. Its high school is Westside High School.
