= Arkansas Northeastern College =

Community college in Blytheville, Arkansas, U.S.

- Type: Public community college
- Established: 1975
- President: Christopher Heigle
- Students: 1,914
- Location: Blytheville, Arkansas, United States; 35.898676°N 89.918828°W
- Campus: Rural
- Website: www.anc.edu/

Arkansas Northeastern College is a public community college in Blytheville, Arkansas.

== History ==
Originally called Mississippi County Community College, Harry V. Smith was selected as its first president, serving from February 1975 to October 1, 1983. John P. Sullins succeeded him. In 2003, the college opened up a child care center. It works to provide free daycare for up to 54 of the children of students. In 2015, the college started a 13 million dollar project to combine three of the school's centers: Harry L. Crisp Center, the Burdette Center and the Aircraft & Metals Engineering Center.

== Campuses ==
The college's main campus is in Blytheville, Arkansas. It has additional locations in Leachville and Osceola.

== Academics ==
The college offers technical certificates, associate of science degrees, associate in applied science degrees, and certificates of proficiency. In fall 2013 there were 1,425 students; 619 were full-time and 806 were part-time.
