= Blytheville Municipal Airport =

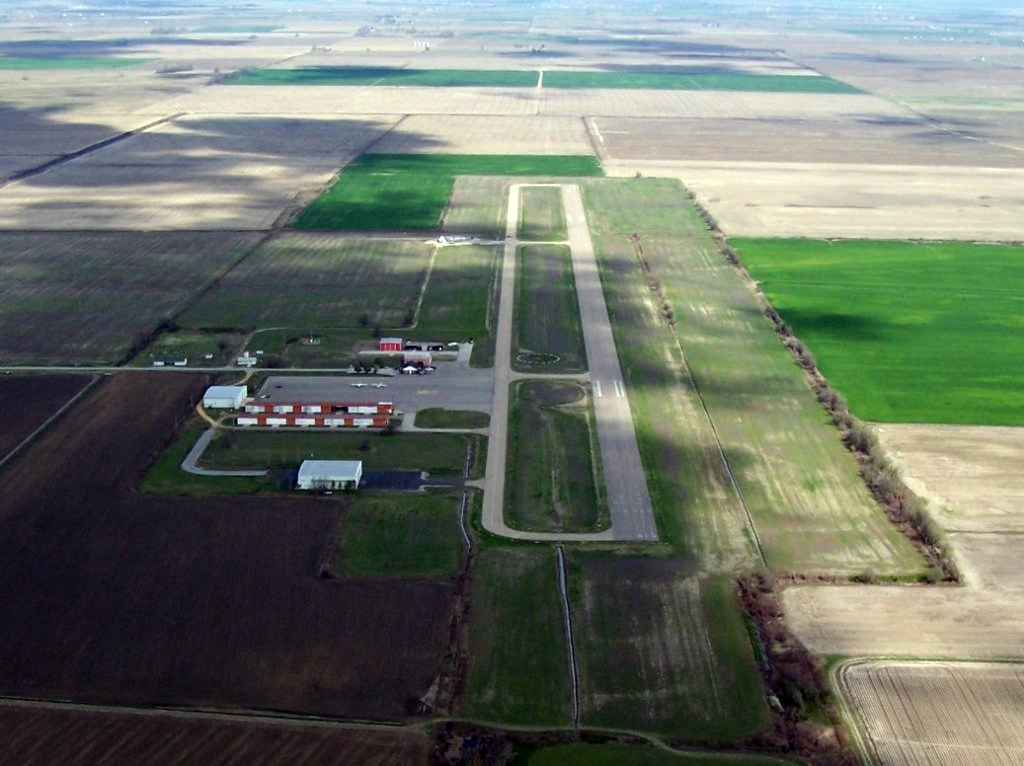
- IATA: HKA; ICAO: KHKA; FAA LID: HKA

Summary
- Airport type: Public
- Owner: City of Blytheville
- Operator: North Delta Aviation
- Serves: Blytheville, Arkansas
- Opened: October 1959
- Elevation AMSL: 256 ft (78 m)
- Coordinates: 35°56′26″N 089°49′51″W

Map
- Location of airport in Arkansas HKA (the United States)

Runways
Direction	Length		Surface
Direction	ft	m	Surface
18/36	5,000	1,524	Asphalt

Statistics (2009)
- Aircraft operations: 41,000
- Based aircraft: 17
- Source: Federal Aviation Administration

Blytheville Municipal Airport (also called Wallace Thomas Field) (IATA: HKA, ICAO: KHKA, FAA LID: HKA) is a public use airport located three nautical miles (4 mi, 6 km) east of the central business district of Blytheville, in Mississippi County, Arkansas, United States. It is owned by the City of Blytheville.

This airport is included in the FAA's National Plan of Integrated Airport Systems for 2011–2015, which categorized it as a general aviation facility.

== History ==
The Blytheville Municipal Airport was constructed in 1959 to replace the city's former municipal airport, which was sold to the US Air Force to be turned into Blytheville Air Force Base. Construction started in mid-April, 1959, with the runway being finished by October of 1959, and soon after hangars and offices were constructed on the site.

In May 2023, the facility was renamed Wallace Thomas Field, after a former airport board member.

== Facilities and aircraft ==
Blytheville Municipal Airport covers an area of 88 acres (36 ha) at an elevation of 256 feet (78 m) above mean sea level. It has one runway designated 18/36 with an asphalt surface measuring 5,000 by 75 feet (1,524 x 23 m).

For the 12-month period ending August 31, 2009, the airport had 41,000 aircraft operations, an average of 112 per day: 95% general aviation, 4% air taxi, and 1% military. At that time there were 17 aircraft based at this airport: 77% single-engine, 12% multi-engine, 6% helicopter, and 6% ultralight.

== See also ==
- List of airports in Arkansas
