= Edgar H. Lloyd =

United States Army officer during World War II

Edgar Harold Lloyd
- Born: February 28, 1922; Blytheville, Arkansas, US
- Died: November 16, 1944 (aged 22) near Pompey, France
- Burial place: Mississippi Country Courthouse Grounds, Blytheville, Arkansas
- Military career
- Allegiance: United States
- Branch: United States Army
- Service years: 1943 – 1944
- Rank: First Lieutenant
- Units: 319th Infantry Regiment, 80th Infantry Division
- Conflicts: World War II
- Awards: Medal of Honor

Edgar Harold Lloyd (February 28, 1922 – November 16, 1944) was a United States Army officer and a recipient of the United States military's highest decoration—the Medal of Honor—for his actions in World War II.

== Biography ==
A son of two farmers, Lloyd attended the University of Arkansas, Joined the Alpha Gamma Rho fraternity, and served as captain of his ROTC company. He joined the Army from his birthplace of Blytheville, Arkansas in April 1943, and attended Officer Candidate School at Fort Benning.

By September 14, 1944, was serving as a first lieutenant in Company E, 319th Infantry Regiment, 80th Infantry Division. On that day, near Pompey, France, he single-handedly destroyed five enemy machine gun positions. Lloyd was killed in action two months later and, on April 7, 1945, was posthumously awarded the Medal of Honor for his actions near Pompey.

Lloyd, aged 22 at his death, was buried at the Courthouse Lawn in his hometown of Blytheville, Arkansas.

== Medal of Honor citation ==
First Lieutenant Lloyd's official Medal of Honor citation reads:

For conspicuous gallantry and intrepidity at the risk of his life above and beyond the call of duty. On September 14, 1944, Company E, 319th Infantry, with which 1st Lt. Lloyd was serving as a rifle platoon leader, was assigned the mission of expelling an estimated enemy force of 200 men from a heavily fortified position near Pompey, France. As the attack progressed, 1st Lt. Lloyd's platoon advanced to within 50 yards of the enemy position where they were caught in a withering machinegun and rifle crossfire which inflicted heavy casualties and momentarily disorganized the platoon. With complete disregard for his own safety, 1st Lt. Lloyd leaped to his feet and led his men on a run into the raking fire, shouting encouragement to them. He jumped into the first enemy machinegun position, knocked out the gunner with his fist, dropped a grenade, and jumped out before it exploded. Still shouting encouragement he went from 1 machinegun nest to another, pinning the enemy down with submachine gun fire until he was within throwing distance, and then destroyed them with hand grenades. He personally destroyed 5 machineguns and many of the enemy, and by his daring leadership and conspicuous bravery inspired his men to overrun the enemy positions and accomplish the objective in the face of seemingly insurmountable odds. His audacious determination and courageous devotion to duty exemplify the highest traditions of the military forces of the United States.

== Awards and decorations ==

| Badge | Combat Infantryman Badge | | |
| 1st row | Medal of Honor | Bronze Star Medal | Purple Heart |
| 2nd row | American Campaign Medal | European–African–Middle Eastern Campaign Medal with 1 Campaign star | World War II Victory Medal |

== See also ==
- List of Medal of Honor recipients
