= Calumet, Arkansas =

- Unincorporated community
- Location within Arkansas Location within the United States
- Coordinates: 35°58′54″N 89°59′10″W
- Country: United States
- State: Arkansas
- County: Mississippi
- Elevation: 246 ft (75 m)
- Time zone: UTC-6 (Central (CST))
  - Summer (DST): UTC-5 (CDT)
- Area code: 870
- GNIS feature ID: 56948

Calumet is an unincorporated community in Mississippi County, Arkansas, United States. Calumet is located at the junction of Arkansas highways 151 and 181 on the northeast border of Gosnell.
