= Stegall, Arkansas =

- Unincorporated community
- Location within Arkansas Location within the United States
- Coordinates: 35°36′26″N 91°08′24″W
- Country: United States
- State: Arkansas
- County: Jackson
- Elevation: 1,890 ft (580 m)
- Time zone: UTC-6 (Central (CST))
  - Summer (DST): UTC-5 (CDT)
- Area code: 870
- GNIS feature ID: 55199

Stegall is an unincorporated community in Jackson County, Arkansas, United States.

== Geography ==
Stegall is located at 35°36′26″N 91°08′24″W (35.607302, -91.140125).

== History ==
Stegall Arkansas was officially created in 1905 [2] when Perry P. Stegall applied for a post office for the small community, 8 miles (13 km) east of the county seat Newport on Arkansas Highway 384.

in 1942 [2] the Stegall community school was annexed into Newport Arkansas 72112.
