= Arkansas Highway 151 =

State highway in Arkansas, United States

Highway 151

Route information
- Maintained by ArDOT

Section 1
- Length: 1.90 mi (3.06 km)
- East end: Loop 151 in Texarkana
- North end: I-49 in Texarkana

Section 2
- Length: 5.75 mi (9.25 km)
- South end: AR 148 near Blytheville
- North end: AR 18 in Blytheville

Section 3
- Length: 6.65 mi (10.70 km)
- South end: US 78 / AR 18 in Blytheville
- North end: Route TT at the Missouri state line in Gosnell

Location
- Country: United States
- State: Arkansas
- Counties: Mississippi

Highway system
- Arkansas Highway System; Interstate; US; State; Business; Spurs; Suffixed; Scenic; Heritage
← AR 150	→ AR 152

Arkansas Highway 151 (AR 151, Hwy. 151) is a designation for two north–south state highways in Mississippi County, Arkansas. An eastern route of 5.75 miles (9.25 km) runs from Highway 148 north to Highway 18. A second route of 6.65 miles (10.70 km) begins at U.S. Route 78 (US 78)/Highway 18 in Blytheville and runs north to Missouri supplemental route TT (SSR-TT) at the Missouri state line. A third route was dedicated in May 2013 and begins at State Line Avenue in Texarkana and continues east to Interstate 49 (I-49)/US 71.

== Route description ==
=== Highway 148 to Blytheville ===
The route begins at Highway 148 southeast of Blytheville and runs north near Promised Land to intersect the eastern end of Highway 312 at the Blytheville city limits. Highway 151 continues north into Blytheville over the BNSF railroad tracks to terminate at Highway 18.

=== Blytheville to Missouri ===
Highway 151 begins at US 78/Highway 18 (Main Street) in Blytheville and runs north to Gosnell and Arkansas International Airport. The route intersects and forms a concurrency with Highway 181 northwest for 2.04 miles (3.28 km), with Highway 151 splitting north to terminate at Missouri supplemental route TT at the Missouri state line.

=== Texarkana ===
This 1.4 miles (2.3 km) section is an extension of Loop 151 and was formerly signed Arkansas Highway 245. It serves to complete the three-quarter, freeway-grade beltway around Texarkana, which connects I-49 with I-369. The route was signed at the on-ramps from the Arkansas side of State Line Avenue with 151 shields and has no exits between its termini.

== Major intersections ==
Mile markers reset at concurrencies.

County	Location	mi	km	Exit	Destinations	Notes
Miller	Texarkana	0.00	0.00	—	Loop 151 east S. State Line Avenue	Western terminus of first segment; continues west as Loop 151
Miller	Texarkana	1.4– 1.9	2.3– 3.1	1	I-49 – Shreveport, Texarkana	Northern terminus of first segment; northbound exit and sounthbound entrance
Gap in route; second segment begins
Mississippi		0.00	0.00		AR 148	Southern terminus of second segment
Mississippi	Blytheville	4.77	7.68		AR 312 west	
Mississippi	Blytheville	5.75	9.25		AR 18 – Blytheville, Armorel	Northern terminus of second segment
Mississippi	Blytheville	Gap in route; third segment begins				
Mississippi	Blytheville	0.00	0.00		US 78 / AR 18 (Main Street) – Business District, Jonesboro	Southern terminus of third segment
Mississippi	Gosnell	3.30	5.31		AR 181 north	South end of AR 181 overlap
Mississippi	Gosnell	5.34	8.59		AR 181 south – Dell	North end of AR 181 overlap
Mississippi		6.65	10.70		Route TT north	Northern terminus of third segment; Continues north as Route TT
1.000 mi = 1.609 km; 1.000 km = 0.621 mi: Concurrency terminus; Incomplete access; Route transition

== See also ==
- List of state highways in Arkansas
