= Bassett, Arkansas =

- Town
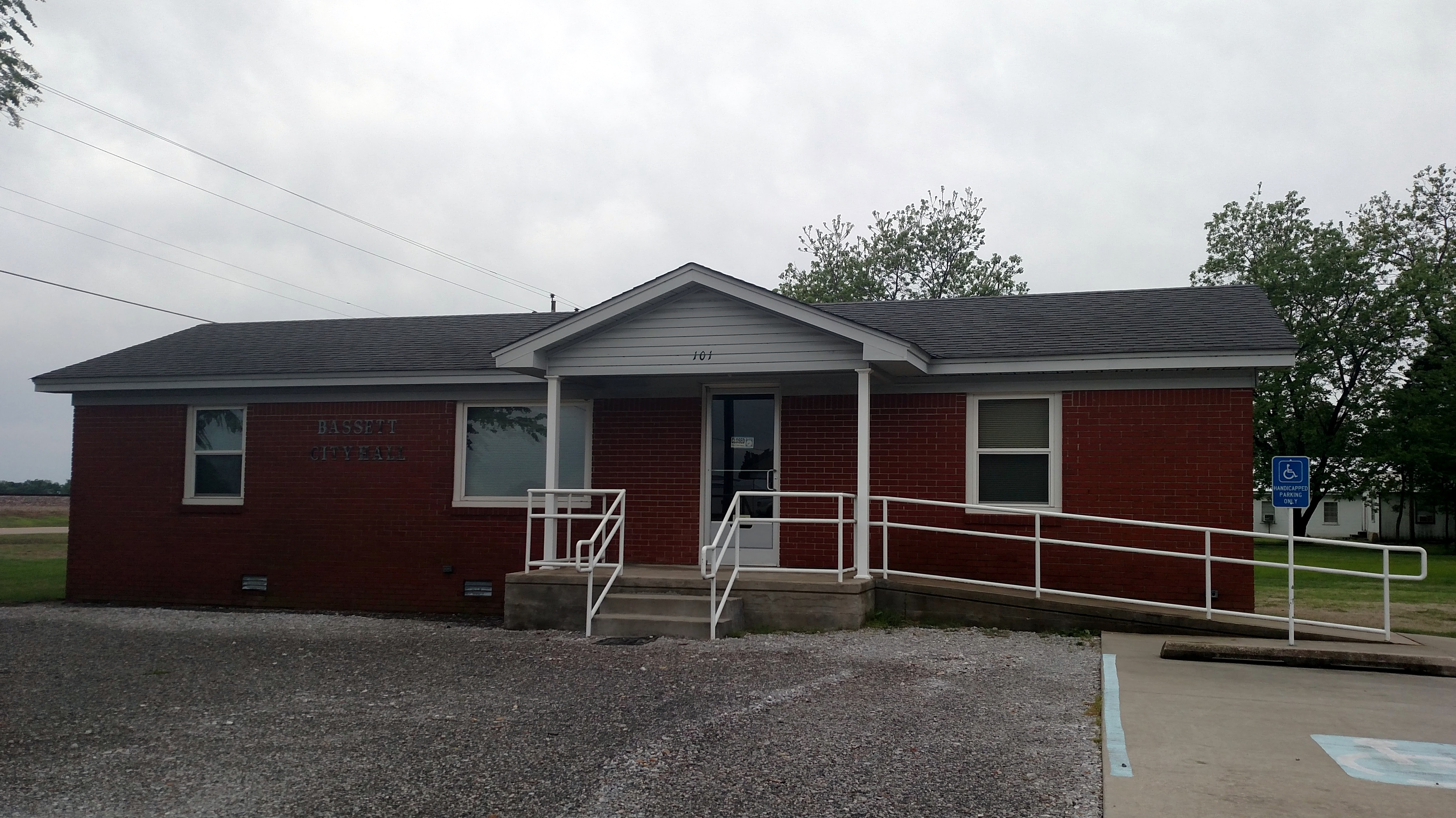
- Town Hall in Bassett

- Location in Mississippi County, Arkansas
- Coordinates: 35°32′10″N 90°7′34″W
- Country: United States
- State: Arkansas
- County: Mississippi
- First Settled: 1860's
- Incorporated: November 26, 1965

Area
  - Total: 0.24 sq mi (0.63 km^{2})
  - Land: 0.24 sq mi (0.63 km^{2})
  - Water: 0 sq mi (0.00 km^{2})
- Elevation: 236 ft (72 m)

Population (2020)
  - Total: 124
  - Estimate (2025): 115 ▼
  - Density: 506.2/sq mi (195.43/km^{2})
- Time zone: UTC-6 (Central (CST))
  - Summer (DST): UTC-5 (CDT)
- ZIP code: 72313
- Area code: 870
- FIPS code: 05-03940
- GNIS feature ID: 2405212

Bassett is a town in Mississippi County, Arkansas, United States. The population was 124 at the 2020 census, down from 173 in 2010.

== History ==
Prior to the late 1860s Bassett Cemetery was established in the area. The oldest grave marker in the cemetery is dated 1868. In 1903, the St. Louis & San Francisco Railway built a line through the town, but a depot was constructed in neighboring Joiner, Arkansas instead. The town received a post office the following year.

== Geography ==
Bassett is located in southern Mississippi County at 35°32′9″N 90°7′34″W (35.535942, -90.126052). U.S. Route 61 passes through the town, leading northeast 16 miles (26 km) to Osceola, the county seat, and southwest 14 miles (23 km) to Turrell. Arkansas Highway 181 runs west 2 miles (3 km) from the center of Bassett to Interstate 55 at Exit 36.

According to the United States Census Bureau, the town has a total area of 0.25 square miles (0.65 km^{2}), all land.

== Demographics ==
Historical population
Census	Pop.	Note	%±
1970	265		—
1980	243		−8.3%
1990	199		−18.1%
2000	168		−15.6%
2010	173		3.0%
2020	124		−28.3%
2025 (est.)	115	▼	−7.3%
U.S. Decennial Census

As of the 2010 United States census, there were 173 people living in the town. The racial makeup of the town was 90.2% White, 8.1% Black, and 1.7% were Hispanic or Latino of any race.

As of the census of 2000, there were 168 people, 71 households, and 49 families living in the town. The population density was 270.3 people/km^{2} (700 people/mi^{2}). There were 76 housing units at an average density of 122.3 units/km^{2} (317 units/mi^{2}). The racial makeup of the town was 94.81% White, and 5.19% from two or more races. 0.60% of the population were Hispanic or Latino of any race.

There were 71 households, out of which 32.4% had children under the age of 18 living with them, 45.1% were married couples living together, 14.1% had a female householder with no husband present, and 29.6% were non-families. 26.8% of all households were made up of individuals, and 15.5% had someone living alone who was 65 years of age or older. The average household size was 2.37 and the average family size was 2.80.

In the town, the population was spread out, with 23.2% under the age of 18, 5.4% from 18 to 24, 29.2% from 25 to 44, 25.0% from 45 to 64, and 17.3% who were 65 years of age or older. The median age was 40 years. For every 100 females, there were 88.8 males. For every 100 females age 18 and over, there were 89.7 males.

The median income for a household in the town was $31,607, and the median income for a family was $32,813. Males had a median income of $28,750 versus $21,250 for females. The per capita income for the town was $13,464. About 18.4% of families and 23.6% of the population were below the poverty line, including 36.1% of those under the age of eighteen and 9.5% of those 65 or over.
