= Black Oak, Arkansas =

- Town
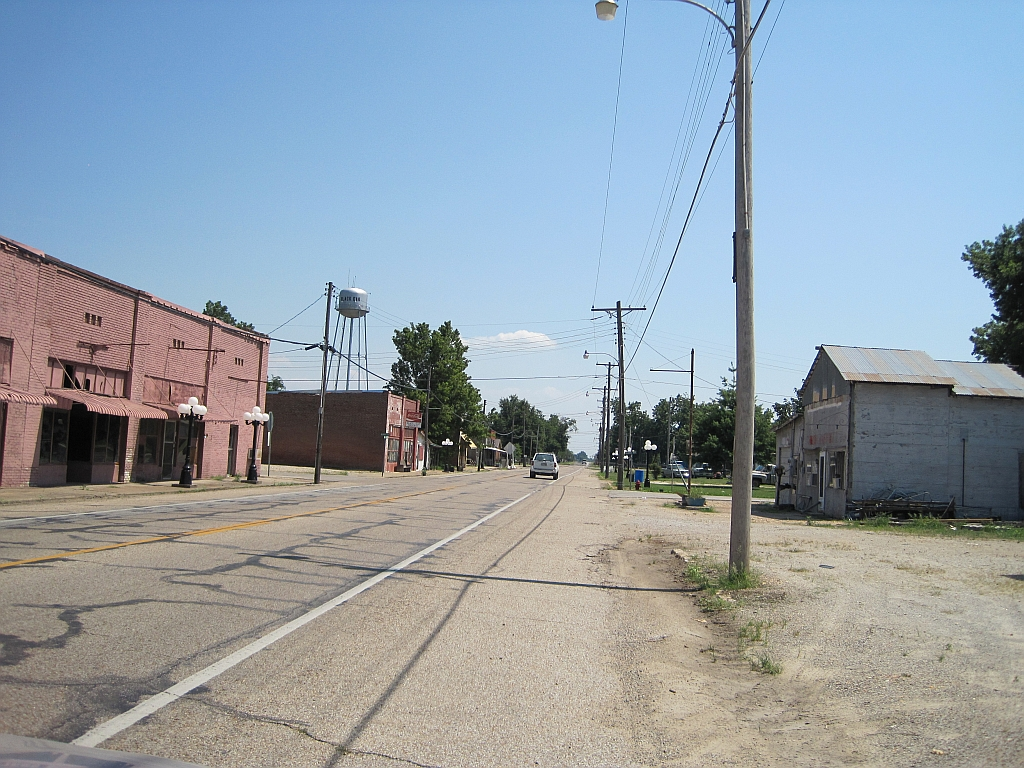
- Downtown Black Oak

- Location of Black Oak in Craighead County, Arkansas.
- Coordinates: 35°50′11″N 90°22′03″W
- Country: United States
- State: Arkansas
- County: Craighead

Area
  - Total: 0.42 sq mi (1.08 km^{2})
  - Land: 0.42 sq mi (1.08 km^{2})
  - Water: 0 sq mi (0.00 km^{2})
- Elevation: 233 ft (71 m)

Population (2020)
  - Total: 233
  - Estimate (2025): 261 ▲
  - Density: 557.1/sq mi (215.09/km^{2})
- Time zone: UTC-6 (Central (CST))
  - Summer (DST): UTC-5 (CDT)
- ZIP code: 72414
- Area code: 870
- FIPS code: 05-06610
- GNIS feature ID: 2405273

Black Oak is a town in Craighead County, Arkansas, United States. The population was 233 in the 2020 census. It is included in the Jonesboro, Arkansas Metropolitan Statistical Area.

== Geography ==
Black Oak is located in eastern Craighead County, 20 miles (32 km) east of Jonesboro, the county seat, and 4 miles (6 km) south of Monette. According to the United States Census Bureau, the town has a total area of 0.4 square miles (1.0 km^{2}), all land.

Ecologically, Black Oak is located within the St. Francis Lowlands ecoregion within the larger Mississippi Alluvial Plain. The St. Francis Lowlands are a flat region mostly covered with row crop agriculture today, though also containing sand blows and sunken lands remaining from the 1811–12 New Madrid earthquakes. Waterways have mostly been channelized, causing loss of aquatic and riparian wildlife habitat. The St. Francis Sunken Lands Wildlife Management Area, which preserves some of the bottomland hardwood forest typical of this ecoregion prior to development for row agriculture lies just west of Black Oak along the St. Francis River.

=== List of highways ===
- Highway 18
- Highway 135
- Highway 148

== Demographics ==
Historical population
Census	Pop.	Note	%±
1930	302		—
1940	329		8.9%
1950	261		−20.7%
1960	220		−15.7%
1970	272		23.6%
1980	309		13.6%
1990	277		−10.4%
2000	286		3.2%
2010	262		−8.4%
2020	233		−11.1%
2025 (est.)	261	▲	12.0%
U.S. Decennial Census; 2014 Estimate

As of the census of 2000, there were 286 people, 120 houses and 81 families residing in the town. The population density was 641.3 inhabitants per square mile (247.6/km^{2}). There were 132 housing units at an average density of 296.0 per square mile (114.3/km^{2}). The racial makeup of the town was 97.55% White, 0.35% Black or African American, 0.70% Native American, 0.70% Asian, 0.70% from other races. 0.70% of the population were Hispanic or Latino of any race.

There were 120 households, out of which 24.2% had children under the age of 18 living with them, 59.2% were married couples living together, 5.0% had a female householder with no husband present, and 31.7% were non-families. 28.3% of all households were made up of individuals, and 18.3% had someone living alone who were 65 years of age or older. The average household size was 2.38 and the average family size was 2.94.

In the town, the population was spread out, with 20.3% under the age of 18, 6.6% from 18 to 24, 25.9% from 25 to 44, 24.5% from 45 to 64, and 22.7% who were 65 years of age or older. The median age was 42 years. For every 100 females, there were 111.9 males. For every 100 females aged 18 and over, there were 98.3 males.

The median income for a household in the town was $22,353, and the median income for a family was $32,917. Males had a median income of $26,042 versus $20,833 for females. The per capita income for the town was $13,237. 17.5% of the population and 10.7% of families were below the poverty line. Out of the total population, 27.1% of those under the age of 18 and 16.7% of those 65 and older were living below the poverty line.

== Gallery ==
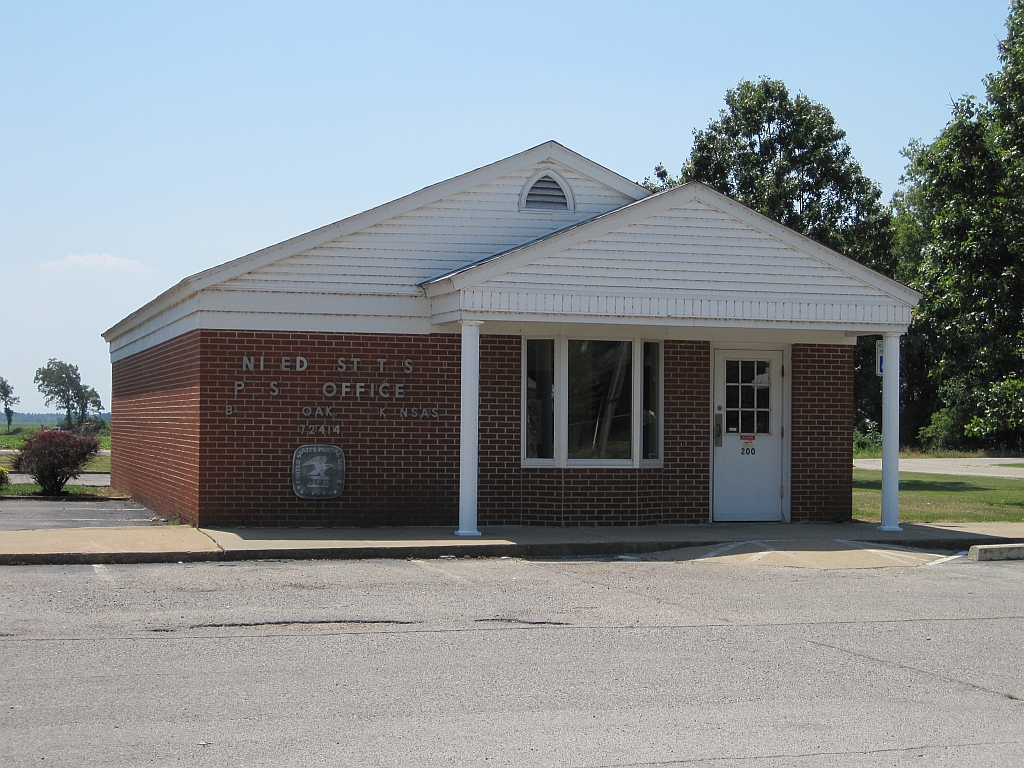
Black Oak post office

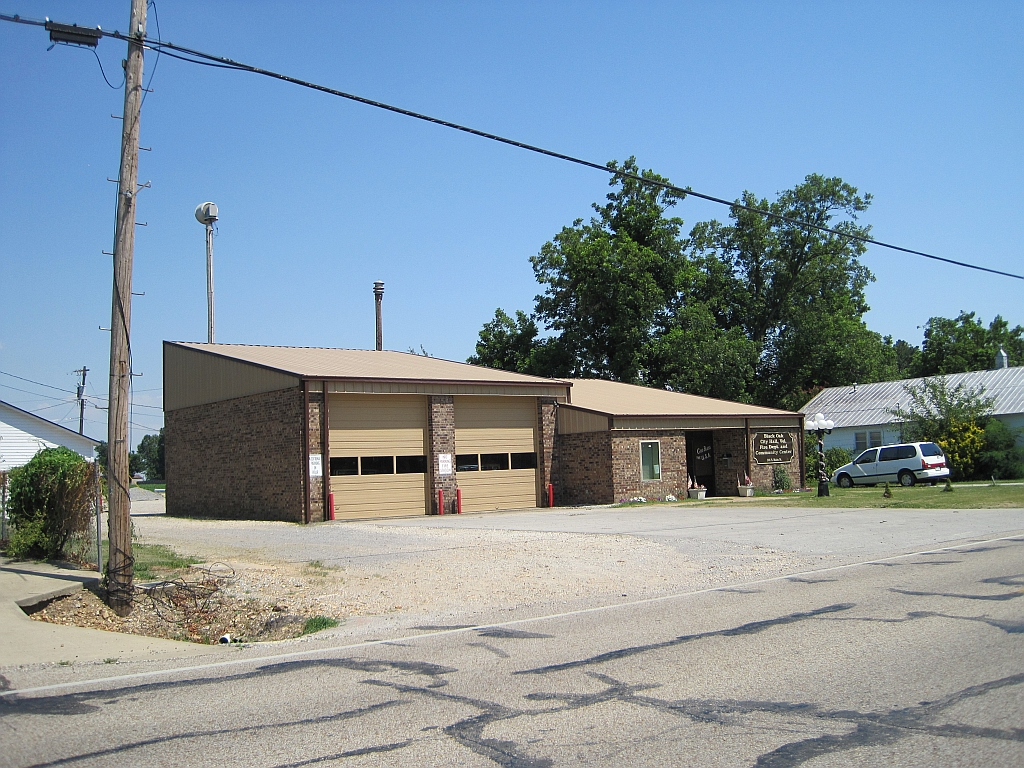
Building in Black Oak

== Notable people ==
Black Oak is the hometown of the founding members of the 1970s Southern rock band Black Oak Arkansas.

John Grisham attended first grade at the Black Oak Elementary School for one semester, and his novel A Painted House is set in Black Oak and the surrounding area.

== Other Arkansas communities named "Black Oak" ==
There are two other, smaller, communities in Arkansas named Black Oak, one of which is in Washington County, approximately 8 miles (13 km) southeast of Fayetteville. The other is in Poinsett County, about 5 miles (8 km) south of Marked Tree. The DeLorme atlas of Arkansas suggests these two hamlets are little more than crossroads.
