= Newport Municipal Airport (Arkansas) =

Airport in Jackson County

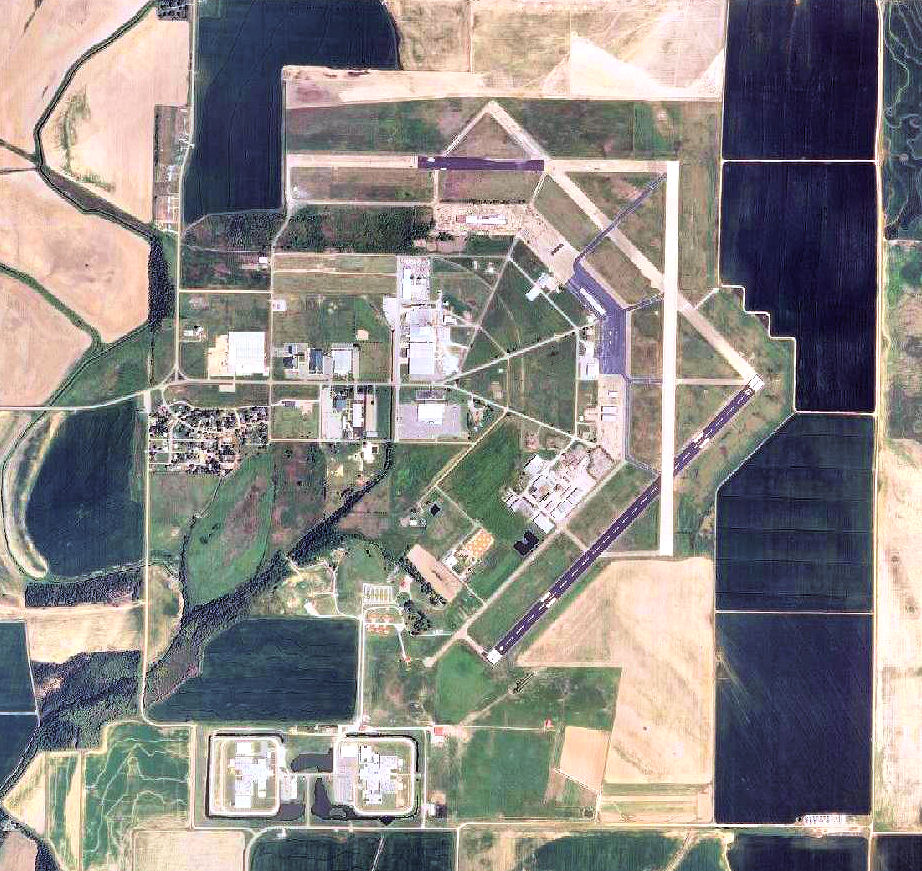
- USGS aerial image, 2006
- IATA: none; ICAO: none; FAA LID: M19

Summary
- Airport type: Public
- Owner: City of Newport
- Serves: Newport, Arkansas
- Elevation AMSL: 239 ft / 73 m
- Coordinates: 35°38′16″N 91°10′35″W

Map
- Location of airport in Arkansas M19 (the United States)

Runways
Direction	Length		Surface
Direction	ft	m	Surface
4/22	5,002	1,525	Concrete
18/36	5,002	1,525	Concrete

Statistics (2009)
- Aircraft operations: 10,000
- Based aircraft: 25
- Source: Federal Aviation Administration

Newport Municipal Airport (FAA LID: M19) is a city-owned public-use airport located five nautical miles (6 mi, 9 km) northeast of the central business district of Newport, a city in Jackson County, Arkansas, United States. It is included in the National Plan of Integrated Airport Systems for 2011–2015, which categorized it as a general aviation airport.

== History ==
Newport was chosen as a site for an Army Airfield during World War II through the encouragement of Congressman Wilbur D. Mills. The flat land already lent itself to airport usage as most trees had been cleared and the ground had been drained for farming. The project was announced in the middle of May 1942 and construction began almost immediately. 34 farm families were displaced from the main site, along with those living at the auxiliary sites. Construction was rapid given the emergency wartime conditions and within three months the post was to be in full operation. The airfield consisted of four concrete runways, 4907x150 (N/S), 5004x150 (NE/SW), 5000x150 (E/W), 5000x150 (NW/SE), plus associated taxiways, landing aids, and an extended length parking apron.

After the war, it reverted to civilian use.

=== Civil use ===
After the war's end, the Newport airfield was declared to be government surplus, and eventually, most of the main field was turned over to the City of Newport to be used as a civilian airport facility and industrial park. While many of the base's buildings were sold off, some were used by civilians who occupied much of the housing. The large hangar-type buildings were all gone by the early 1960s, and there are no longer any military buildings remaining at the airfield. All the auxiliary airfields were disposed of and none of the temporary structures built by the USAAF or USMC remain today. The few that survived the war were destroyed by a tornado in 1953.

Several of the runways are still in use, and a new airport terminal was constructed in 1983. A number of industries are located at what is now the Newport Industrial Park. The Jackson County Learning Center has been located at the base since 1959. Some homes from the original residential area are still occupied. Also holding a place of prominence at the former airbase is Arkansas State University-Newport.

== Facilities and aircraft ==
Newport Municipal Airport covers an area of 331 acres (134 ha) at an elevation of 239 feet (73 m) above mean sea level. It has two runways, 4/22 and 18/36, each with a concrete surface measuring 5,002 by 150 feet (1,525 x 46 m).

For the 12-month period ending July 31, 2009, the airport had 10,000 aircraft operations, an average of 27 per day: 93% general aviation, 6% air taxi, and 1% military. At that time there were 25 aircraft based at this airport: 92% single-engine, and 8% multi-engine.

== See also ==
- Arkansas World War II Army Airfields
- List of airports in Arkansas
