= Uno, Arkansas =

Unincorporated community in Arkansas, US

Coordinates: 35°38′55″N 91°01′39″W

Location of Uno within the state of Arkansas.

Uno is an unincorporated community in Poinsett County, Arkansas, United States.
