= Monette, Arkansas =

- City
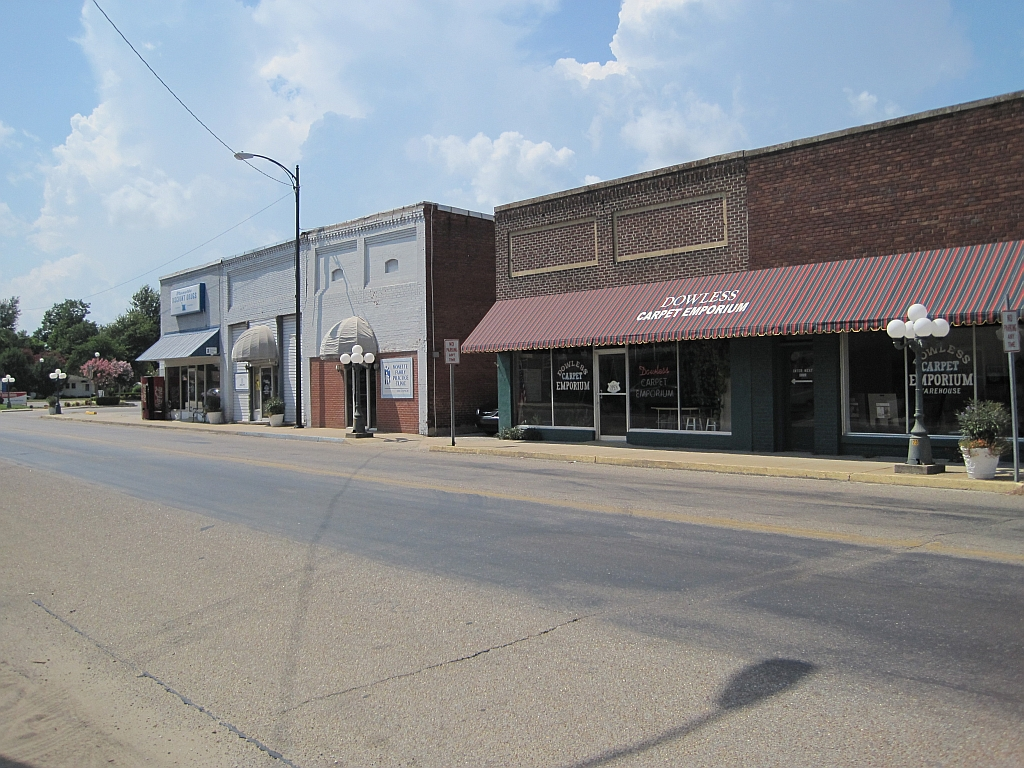
- Downtown Monette, July 2011

- Location of Monette in Craighead County, Arkansas.
- Coordinates: 35°53′05″N 90°19′35″W
- Country: United States
- State: Arkansas
- County: Craighead
- Settled: 1898
- Incorporated: July 3, 1900

Area
  - Total: 5.66 sq mi (14.67 km^{2})
  - Land: 5.66 sq mi (14.65 km^{2})
  - Water: 0.0077 sq mi (0.02 km^{2})
- Elevation: 236 ft (72 m)

Population (2020)
  - Total: 1,506
  - Estimate (2025): 1,679 ▲
  - Density: 266.2/sq mi (102.79/km^{2})
- Time zone: UTC-6 (Central (CST))
  - Summer (DST): UTC-5 (CDT)
- ZIP code: 72447
- Area code: 870
- FIPS code: 05-46400
- GNIS feature ID: 2404281
- Website: cityofmonette.org

Monette is a city in Craighead County, Arkansas, United States. The city is located in an area of Northeast Arkansas known as Buffalo Island. The population was 1,506 at the 2020 census.

== History ==
The city of Monette was initially settled in 1898, when the Jonesboro, Lake City and Eastern Railroad bypassed the town of Stottsville (about a mile away from the town's present location, founded by Adam Stots in the 1870's) in 1898. Settlers and businessmen in Stottsville decided to relocate to the new railroad. The first train arrived in Monette on August 19, 1898, and the town was incorporated two years later on July 3, 1900.

On December 10, 2021, a large and violent EF4 tornado part of a large tornado outbreak struck Monette. One person was killed at a nursing home on the north side of town. On April 2, 2025, during another tornado outbreak, a large EF3 tornado caused damage to infrastructure, buildings, and homes along the outskirts of town. It is believed that no one within Monette was seriously injured; however the tornado did injure 8 others in the neighboring towns of Bay and Lake City, Arkansas.

== Geography ==
Monette is located in eastern Craighead County. According to the United States Census Bureau, the city has a total area of 6.3 square miles (16.3 km^{2}), of which 0.012 square miles (0.03 km^{2}), or 0.19%, is water.

Ecologically, Monette is located within the St. Francis Lowlands ecoregion within the larger Mississippi Alluvial Plain. The St. Francis Lowlands are a flat region mostly covered with row crop agriculture today, though also containing sand blows and sunken lands remaining from the 1811–12 New Madrid earthquakes. Waterways have mostly been channelized, causing loss of aquatic and riparian wildlife habitat. The St. Francis Sunken Lands Wildlife Management Area, which preserves some of the bottomland hardwood forest typical of this ecoregion prior to development for row agriculture lies just west of Monette along the St. Francis River.

=== List of highways ===
- Highway 18
- Highway 139

== Demographics ==
Historical population
Census	Pop.	Note	%±
1910	559		—
1920	1,066		90.7%
1930	1,111		4.2%
1940	1,074		−3.3%
1950	1,114		3.7%
1960	981		−11.9%
1970	1,076		9.7%
1980	1,165		8.3%
1990	1,115		−4.3%
2000	1,179		5.7%
2010	1,501		27.3%
2020	1,506		0.3%
2025 (est.)	1,679	▲	11.5%
U.S. Decennial Census

Monette is included in the Jonesboro, Arkansas Metropolitan Statistical Area.

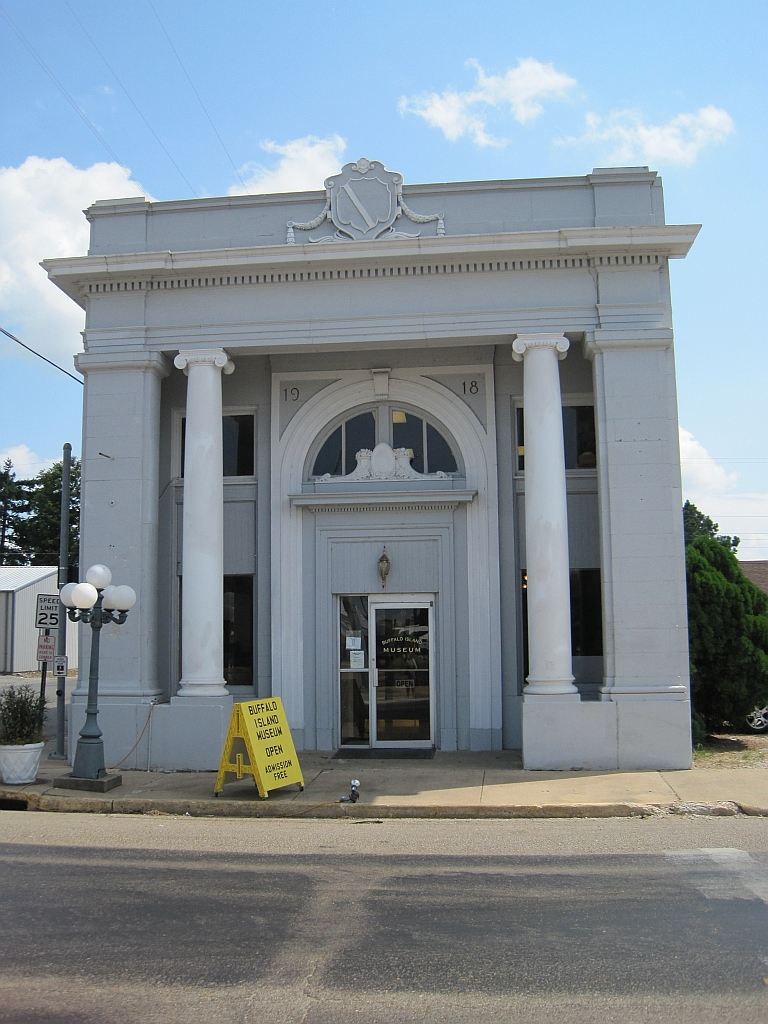
The First National Bank Building in Monette is listed on the National Register of Historic Places.

=== 2020 census ===
As of the 2020 census, Monette had a population of 1,506. The median age was 44.5 years. 21.4% of residents were under the age of 18 and 24.9% were 65 years of age or older. For every 100 females, there were 90.2 males, and for every 100 females age 18 and over there were 86.2 males.

0.0% of residents lived in urban areas, while 100.0% lived in rural areas.

There were 632 households in Monette, of which 29.0% had children under the age of 18 living in them. Of all households, 44.6% were married-couple households, 20.3% were households with a male householder and no spouse or partner present, and 28.2% were households with a female householder and no spouse or partner present. About 35.8% of all households were made up of individuals and 20.7% had someone living alone who was 65 years of age or older.

There were 707 housing units, of which 10.6% were vacant. The homeowner vacancy rate was 1.4% and the rental vacancy rate was 5.9%.

Monette racial composition
Race	Number	Percentage
White (non-Hispanic)	1,363	90.5%
Black or African American (non-Hispanic)	7	0.46%
Native American	1	0.07%
Other/Mixed	25	1.66%
Hispanic or Latino	110	7.3%

=== Demographic estimates ===
As of the census of 2009, the population density was 721.8 inhabitants per square mile (278.7/km^{2}), and the housing density was 348.3 per square mile (134.5/km^{2}).

Non-family households made up 39.6% of all households. The average household size was 2.12 and the average family size was 2.78.

In the city, 7.3% of the population was from 18 to 24, 23.6% was from 25 to 44, and 23.7% was from 45 to 64.

The median income for a household in the city was $27,500, and the median income for a family was $33,796. Males had a median income of $28,375 versus $20,109 for females. The per capita income for the city was $16,517. About 13.3% of families and 16.4% of the population were below the poverty line, including 20.8% of those under age 18 and 25.7% of those age 65 or over.

== Education ==
=== Public education ===
Monette is the headquarters for the Buffalo Island Central School District, which provides public education to more than 850 elementary and secondary school students in Craighead and Mississippi counties. Students graduate from the Monette-based Buffalo Island Central High School. The school's mascot and athletic emblem is the Mustangs.

The Buffalo Island Central School District was established on July 1, 1984. Until that point the Monette School District served the community; on that day it merged with the Leachville School District to form the current school district.

=== Public libraries ===
Kohn Memorial Library

Kohn Memorial Library is the city's public library and one of seven branch libraries of the Crowley Ridge Regional library system.

== Notable persons ==
- Jim "Dandy" Mangrum, lead singer and frontman of the Southern rock band Black Oak Arkansas
- Dave Wallace, Republican member of the Arkansas House of Representatives from Mississippi County; former Monette resident
