= Dell, Arkansas =

- Town
- Town of Dell
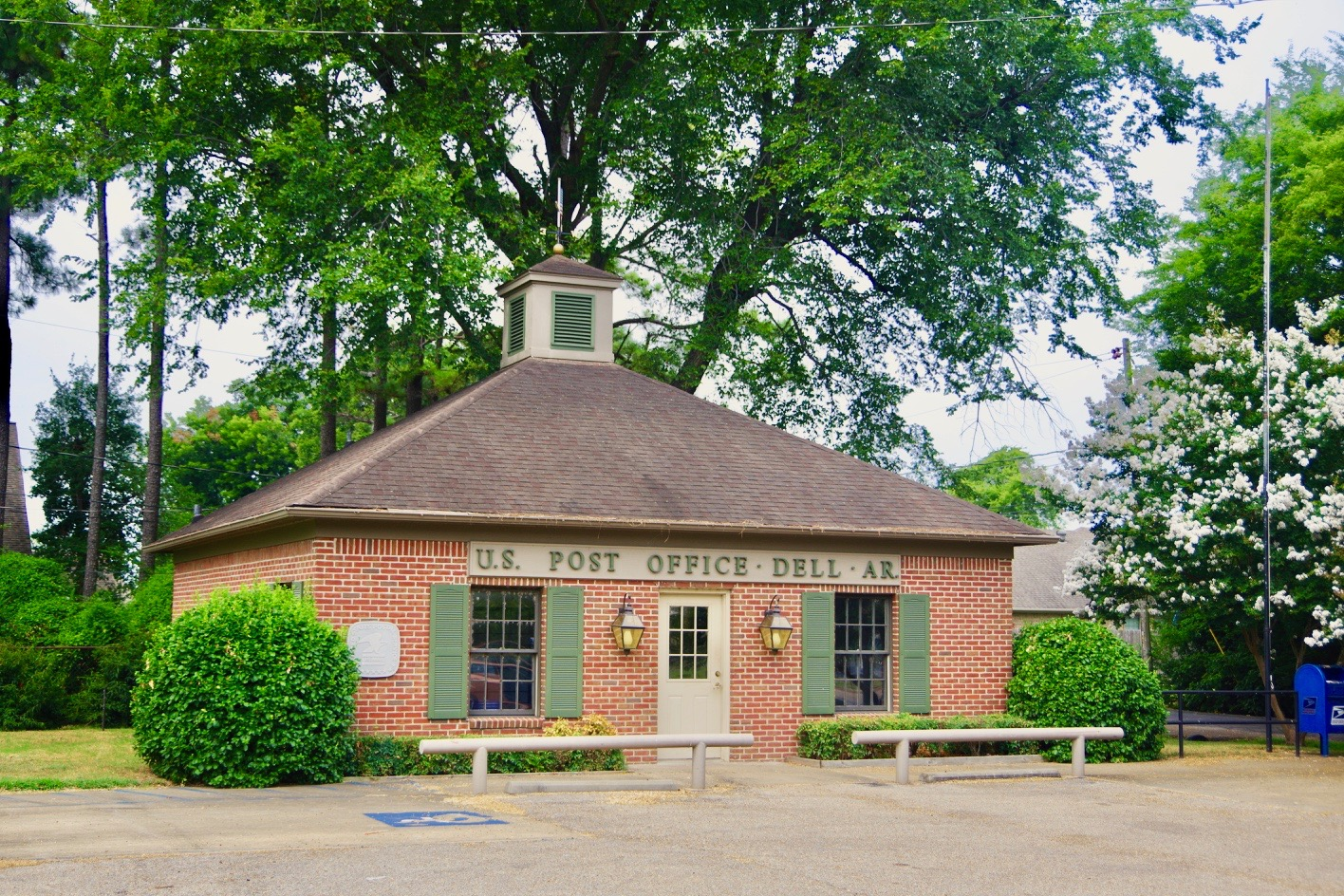
- Post office in Dell

- Location in Mississippi County, Arkansas
- Coordinates: 35°51′26″N 90°02′03″W
- Country: United States
- State: Arkansas
- County: Mississippi

Area
  - Total: 0.92 sq mi (2.38 km^{2})
  - Land: 0.92 sq mi (2.38 km^{2})
  - Water: 0 sq mi (0.00 km^{2})
- Elevation: 240 ft (73 m)

Population (2020)
  - Total: 194
  - Estimate (2025): 181 ▼
  - Density: 210.7/sq mi (81.37/km^{2})
- Time zone: UTC-6 (Central (CST))
  - Summer (DST): UTC-5 (CDT)
- ZIP code: 72426
- Area code: 870
- FIPS code: 05-18160
- GNIS feature ID: 2406372
- Website: townofdell.com

Dell is a town in Mississippi County, Arkansas, United States. The population was 194 at the 2020 census.

== History ==
Dell has its origins in a community that developed around a loading dock and post office operated by J.B. Richardson in the late 1890s. When the Jonesboro, Lake City and Eastern Railroad completed a rail line through the area, a town was laid out near the tracks. The town was initially known as "Rozell" after an early landowner, but due to naming conflicts with a nearby community known as "Rochelle", the name was changed to "Dell". The town incorporated in 1905.

== Geography ==
Dell is located in northern Mississippi County. The town lies along the Pemiscot Bayou 9 miles (14 km) southwest of Blytheville, the largest city in the county, and 10 miles (16 km) south of the Arkansas-Missouri state line. Arkansas Highway 18 passes through Dell, connecting the town with Blytheville to the northeast and Manila 8 miles (13 km) to the west. Arkansas Highway 181 intersects AR 14 in Dell, connecting the town with Gosnell 11 miles (18 km) to the northeast and Keiser 15 miles (24 km) to the south.

According to the United States Census Bureau, the town of Dell has a total area of 0.92 square miles (2.38 km^{2}), all land.

== Demographics ==
Historical population
Census	Pop.	Note	%±
1910	162		—
1920	233		43.8%
1930	267		14.6%
1940	323		21.0%
1950	384		18.9%
1960	383		−0.3%
1970	358		−6.5%
1980	310		−13.4%
1990	258		−16.8%
2000	251		−2.7%
2010	223		−11.2%
2020	194		−13.0%
2025 (est.)	181	▼	−6.7%
U.S. Decennial Census; 2014 Estimate

As of the 2010 United States census, there were 223 people living in the town. The racial makeup of the town was 99.6% White and 0.4% were Hispanic or Latino of any race.

As of the census of 2000, there were 251 people, 115 households, and 73 families living in the town. The population density was 108.9 people/km^{2} (282 people/mi^{2}). There were 121 housing units at an average density of 52.5 units/km^{2} (136 units/mi^{2}). The racial makeup of the town was 89.64% White, 1.20% Black or African American, 0.40% Asian, 7.97% from other races, and 0.80% from two or more races. 7.97% of the population were Hispanic or Latino of any race.

There were 115 households, out of which 18.3% had children under the age of 18 living with them, 48.7% were married couples living together, 12.2% had a female householder with no husband present, and 35.7% were non-families. 34.8% of all households were made up of individuals, and 19.1% had someone living alone who was 65 years of age or older. The average household size was 2.18 and the average family size was 2.78.

In the town, the population was spread out, with 19.5% under the age of 18, 10.8% from 18 to 24, 23.1% from 25 to 44, 23.1% from 45 to 64, and 23.5% who were 65 years of age or older. The median age was 43 years. For every 100 females, there were 90.2 males. For every 100 females age 18 and over, there were 88.8 males.

The median income for a household in the town was $26,607, and the median income for a family was $31,667. Males had a median income of $26,250 versus $21,250 for females. The per capita income for the town was $15,762. About 10.6% of families and 12.1% of the population were below the poverty line, including 13.3% of those under the age of eighteen and 12.0% of those 65 or over.

== Education ==
It is served by the Gosnell School District, including Gosnell Elementary School and Gosnell High School.

The community was served by the Dell School District until July 1, 1984, when it merged into the Gosnell School District.
