= Blytheville, Arkansas =

- City
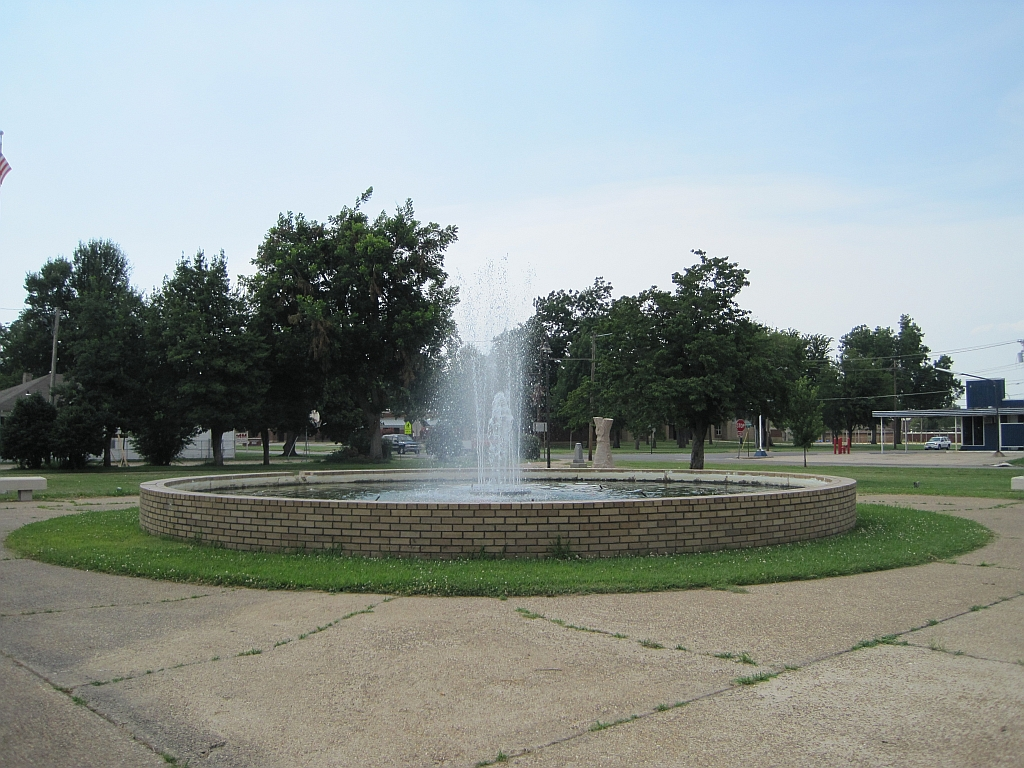
- Blytheville City Park

- Location in Mississippi County, Arkansas
- Coordinates: 35°55′51″N 89°54′18″W
- Country: United States
- State: Arkansas
- County: Mississippi
- First settled: 1880
- Established: January 4, 1892
- Named for: Reverend Henry T. Blythe (1816–1904)

Government
  - Mayor: Melisa Logan

Area
  - Total: 20.80 sq mi (53.87 km^{2})
  - Land: 20.74 sq mi (53.71 km^{2})
  - Water: 0.062 sq mi (0.16 km^{2})
- Elevation: 256 ft (78 m)

Population (2020)
  - Total: 13,406
  - Estimate (2025): 12,227 ▼
  - Density: 646/sq mi (249.6/km^{2})
- Time zone: UTC-6 (Central (CST))
  - Summer (DST): UTC-5 (CDT)
- ZIP codes: 72315, 72316, 72319
- Area code: 870
- FIPS code: 05-07330
- GNIS feature ID: 2403885
- Website: www.cityofblytheville.com

Blytheville (Note: Pronounced /ˈblaɪvəl/ BLY-vəl) is one of two county seats of and the largest city in Mississippi County, Arkansas, United States. It is approximately 60 miles (100 km) north of West Memphis. The population was 13,406 at the 2020 census, down from 15,620 in 2010.

== History ==
Blytheville was founded by Methodist clergyman Henry T. Blythe in 1879. It received a post office the same year, was incorporated in 1889, and became the county seat for the northern half of Mississippi County (Chickasawba District) in 1901. Blytheville received telephone service and electricity in 1903, and natural gas service in 1950.

Forestry was an early industry, spurred by the massive harvesting of lumber needed to rebuild Chicago following the Great Fire of 1871. The lumber industry brought sawmills and a rowdy crowd, and the area was known for its disreputable saloon culture during the 1880s and 1890s. The Paragould Southeastern Railway, which served the logging industry, arrived in town in 1907.

The cleared forests enabled cotton farming to take hold, encouraged by ongoing levee building and waterway management; the population grew significantly after 1900. On Blytheville's western edge lies one of the largest cotton gins in North America. Soybeans and rice have also become important crops.

The area northwest of the town was developed into an "advanced" pilot training school for the Army Air Forces in 1942. The school hosted the BT-13, AT-6, AT-9, and AT-10. The facility closed after the end of WW2 and briefly served as the city's municipal airport.

The area around Blytheville continues to be farmed, though family farms have given way to large factory operations.

The former Blytheville Army Airfield was reopened by the Air Force in 1956 as Blytheville Air Force Base, and from 1959 to 1991 hosted the 97th Wing as part of the Strategic Air Command's Ground Alert Program. The base was closed in December 1992 as part of the 1991 BRAC Commission. In the 1980s, Blytheville began to develop an industrial base, much of which centered on the steel industry. Nucor Steel opened a plant east of Blytheville, on the Mississippi River, in 1987.

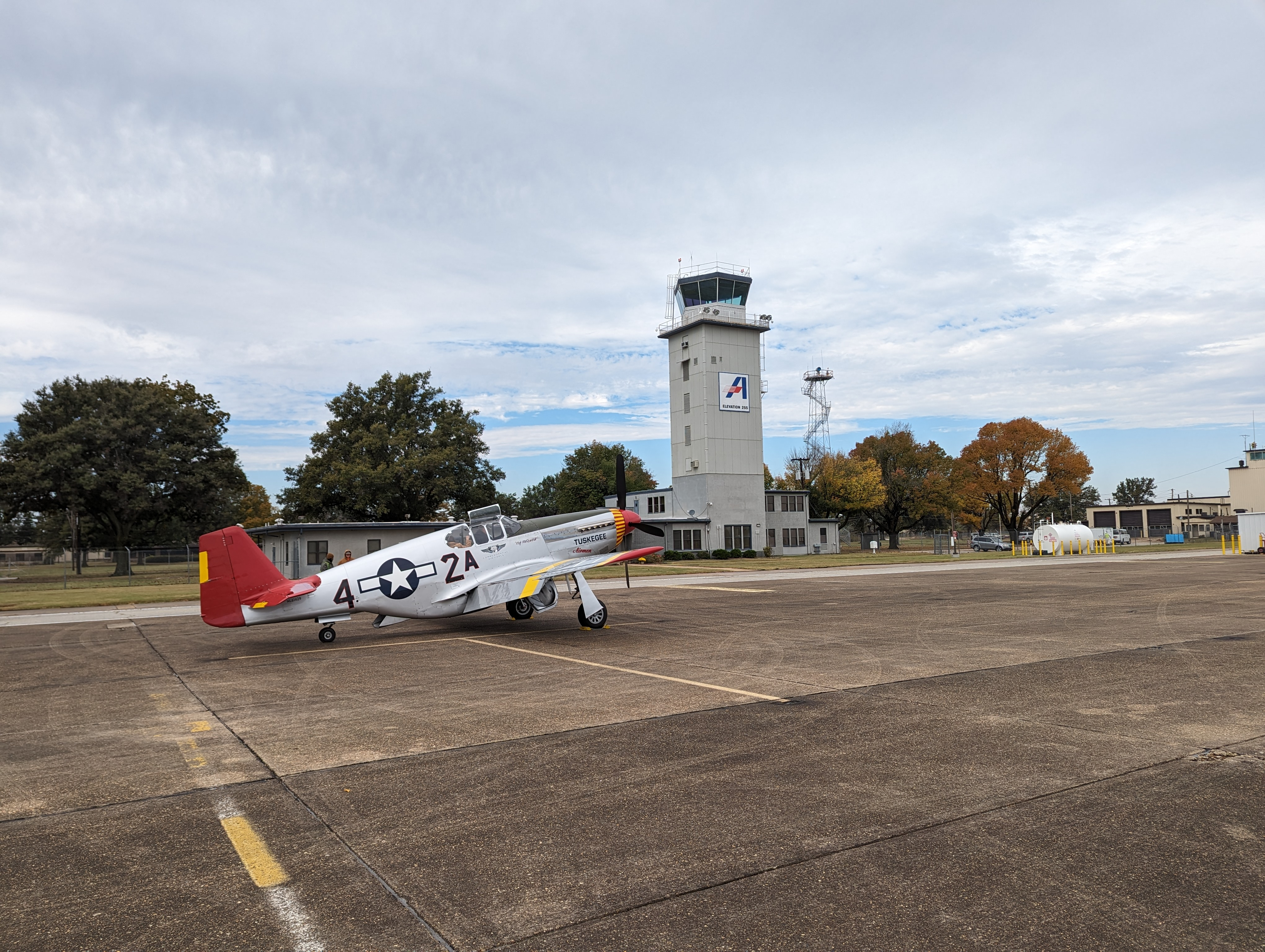
The control tower of the Arkansas Aeroplex (former Blytheville Air Force Base) in 2023.

James Sanders was elected as the mayor of Blytheville in 2011. He was the first African-American to serve in that position. After James Sanders’ retirement in 2023, local accountant and veteran Melissa Logan was elected as the city's first female black mayor.

== Geography ==
Blytheville is located in northeastern Arkansas and northeastern Mississippi County. It is the easternmost incorporated place in Arkansas. The Missouri state line is 5 miles (8 km) north, and the Mississippi River, forming the Tennessee border, is 8 miles (13 km) east.

According to the United States Census Bureau, the city has a total area of 20.8 square miles (54 km^{2}), of which 0.06 square miles (0.16 km^{2}), or 0.29%, are water.

=== Climate ===
The climate in this area is characterized by hot, humid summers and generally mild to cool winters. According to the Köppen Climate Classification system, Blytheville has a humid subtropical climate, abbreviated "Cfa" on climate maps.

Climate data for Blytheville, Arkansas, 1991–2020 normals, extremes 1926–2013
Month	Jan	Feb	Mar	Apr	May	Jun	Jul	Aug	Sep	Oct	Nov	Dec	Year
Record high °F (°C)	79 (26)	80 (27)	88 (31)	94 (34)	99 (37)	109 (43)	109 (43)	107 (42)	106 (41)	99 (37)	88 (31)	79 (26)	109 (43)
Mean maximum °F (°C)	66.7 (19.3)	71.4 (21.9)	78.4 (25.8)	85.7 (29.8)	90.9 (32.7)	97.1 (36.2)	98.3 (36.8)	98.0 (36.7)	93.7 (34.3)	86.2 (30.1)	77.8 (25.4)	67.4 (19.7)	99.9 (37.7)
Mean daily maximum °F (°C)	45.3 (7.4)	50.5 (10.3)	59.6 (15.3)	70.6 (21.4)	79.7 (26.5)	88.0 (31.1)	90.1 (32.3)	89.0 (31.7)	83.4 (28.6)	72.5 (22.5)	59.1 (15.1)	48.9 (9.4)	69.7 (21.0)
Daily mean °F (°C)	37.5 (3.1)	42.0 (5.6)	50.6 (10.3)	61.0 (16.1)	70.5 (21.4)	78.8 (26.0)	81.3 (27.4)	79.9 (26.6)	73.4 (23.0)	62.2 (16.8)	50.2 (10.1)	41.2 (5.1)	60.7 (16.0)
Mean daily minimum °F (°C)	29.8 (−1.2)	33.5 (0.8)	41.6 (5.3)	51.4 (10.8)	61.3 (16.3)	69.7 (20.9)	72.5 (22.5)	70.8 (21.6)	63.5 (17.5)	51.9 (11.1)	41.4 (5.2)	33.5 (0.8)	51.7 (11.0)
Mean minimum °F (°C)	12.4 (−10.9)	16.6 (−8.6)	25.5 (−3.6)	35.5 (1.9)	48.1 (8.9)	58.7 (14.8)	64.0 (17.8)	61.1 (16.2)	48.1 (8.9)	37.3 (2.9)	27.0 (−2.8)	16.3 (−8.7)	7.4 (−13.7)
Record low °F (°C)	−14 (−26)	−3 (−19)	5 (−15)	25 (−4)	34 (1)	46 (8)	51 (11)	49 (9)	35 (2)	25 (−4)	7 (−14)	−7 (−22)	−14 (−26)
Average precipitation inches (mm)	3.85 (98)	4.13 (105)	4.81 (122)	5.40 (137)	5.90 (150)	3.76 (96)	4.00 (102)	3.55 (90)	2.76 (70)	4.07 (103)	4.28 (109)	5.07 (129)	51.58 (1,311)
Average snowfall inches (cm)	0.8 (2.0)	1.7 (4.3)	0.2 (0.51)	0.0 (0.0)	0.0 (0.0)	0.0 (0.0)	0.0 (0.0)	0.0 (0.0)	0.0 (0.0)	0.0 (0.0)	0.0 (0.0)	0.2 (0.51)	2.9 (7.32)
Average precipitation days (≥ 0.01 in)	10.1	8.0	10.4	9.8	10.1	8.1	7.7	5.6	5.8	7.6	10.4	10.3	103.9
Average snowy days (≥ 0.1 in)	0.7	0.9	0.1	0.0	0.0	0.0	0.0	0.0	0.0	0.0	0.0	0.2	1.9
Source 1: NOAA
Source 2: National Weather Service (mean maxima/minima 1981–2010)

== Demographics ==
Historical population
Census	Pop.	Note	%±
1900	302		—
1910	3,849		1,174.5%
1920	6,447		67.5%
1930	10,098		56.6%
1940	10,652		5.5%
1950	16,234		52.4%
1960	20,797		28.1%
1970	24,752		19.0%
1980	23,844		−3.7%
1990	22,906		−3.9%
2000	18,272		−20.2%
2010	15,620		−14.5%
2020	13,406		−14.2%
2025 (est.)	12,227	▼	−8.8%
U.S. Decennial Census

=== 2020 census ===
As of the 2020 census, Blytheville had a population of 13,406. The median age was 36.0 years. 26.7% of residents were under the age of 18 and 15.4% of residents were 65 years of age or older. For every 100 females there were 92.3 males, and for every 100 females age 18 and over there were 87.6 males age 18 and over.

94.9% of residents lived in urban areas, while 5.1% lived in rural areas.

There were 5,462 households in Blytheville, of which 31.3% had children under the age of 18 living in them. Of all households, 29.9% were married-couple households, 23.6% were households with a male householder and no spouse or partner present, and 39.3% were households with a female householder and no spouse or partner present. About 33.6% of all households were made up of individuals and 11.9% had someone living alone who was 65 years of age or older.

As of the 2020 census, there were 3,644 families residing in the city.

There were 6,896 housing units, of which 20.8% were vacant. The homeowner vacancy rate was 4.4% and the rental vacancy rate was 16.1%.

Racial composition as of the 2020 census
Race	Number	Percent
White	4,264	31.8%
Black or African American	8,083	60.3%
American Indian and Alaska Native	39	0.3%
Asian	113	0.8%
Native Hawaiian and Other Pacific Islander	5	0.0%
Some other race	352	2.6%
Two or more races	550	4.1%
Hispanic or Latino (of any race)	542	4.0%

=== 2010 census ===
As of the 2010 United States census, there were 15,620 people living in the city. The racial makeup of the city was 55.9% Black, 38.8% White, 0.2% Native American, 0.8% Asian, 0.1% from some other race and 1.2% from two or more races. 3.0% were Hispanic or Latino of any race.

=== 2000 census ===
As of the census of 2000, there were 18,272 people, 7,001 households, and 4,746 families living in the city. The population density was 887.5 inhabitants per square mile (342.7/km^{2}). There were 8,533 housing units at an average density of 414.5 per square mile (160.0/km^{2}). The racial makeup of the city was 45.15% White, 52.15% Black or African American, 0.19% Native American, 0.60% Asian, 0.07% Pacific Islander, 0.48% from other races, and 1.38% from two or more races. Hispanic or Latino of any race were 1.31% of the population.

There were 7,001 households, out of which 33.3% had children under the age of 18 living with them, 42.3% were married couples living together, 20.9% had a female householder with no husband present, and 32.2% were non-families. 28.1% of all households were made up of individuals, and 11.9% had someone living alone who was 65 years of age or older. The average household size was 2.57 and the average family size was 3.16.

In the city, the population was well distributed, with 29.9% under the age of 18, 10.4% from 18 to 24, 26.0% from 25 to 44, 19.6% from 45 to 64, and 14.1% who were 65 years of age or older. The median age was 33 years. For every 100 females, there were 86.5 males. For every 100 females age 18 and over, there were 81.3 males.

The median income for a household in the city was $26,683, and the median income for a family was $32,816. Males had a median income of $30,889 versus $20,710 for females. The per capita income for the city was $14,426. About 23.3% of families and 28.6% of the population were below the poverty line, including 42.2% of those under age 18 and 17.4% of those age 65 or over.

=== Crime ===
The 2015 City-data.com crime index for Blytheville, Arkansas was 946.2. The U.S. average was 284.1.

== Economy ==
Nucor Steel is the largest employer for both Blytheville and Mississippi County, with four locations (Nucor Yamato Steel, Nucor Steel Arkansas, Nucor Castrip, and Nucor Skyline). Nucor Steel Arkansas announced plans for a new cold mill in 2019.

Aviation Repair Technologies (ART) is headquartered at Arkansas International Airport in Blytheville and employs approximately 120 employees. In February 2015, ART laid off between 50 and 75 employees.

Tenaris, a manufacturer and supplier of seamless and welded steel pipe products, operates 4 ERW (electric resistance welded) pipe manufacturing, threading and coating facilities. In January 2015, Tenaris laid off about 300 employees. In January 2016, Tenaris laid off 100 more employees.

== Recreation ==
- Blytheville City Parks
  - Cyprus Park
  - Nelson Park
  - Walker Park
    - Blytheville City Pool
  - Williams Park
- Blytheville Youth Sportsplex
- Thunder Bayou Golf Course

== Cultural institutions ==
- Adams-Vines Recital Hall (Arkansas Northeastern College)
- Arts Council of Mississippi County
- Blytheville Book Company
- Delta Gateway Museum
- Lights of the Delta
- Main Street Blytheville
- Mississippi County Library System
- National Cold War Center - In 2020, the National Cold War Center was formed by local citizens to create a museum that interpreted the multi-decade conflict known as the Cold War. They are projecting the museum to be open in 2027, and are working to restore the former Blytheville Air Force Base's SAC Ready Alert Facility to serve as the museum's primary exhibit.
- Ritz Civic Center

== Education ==
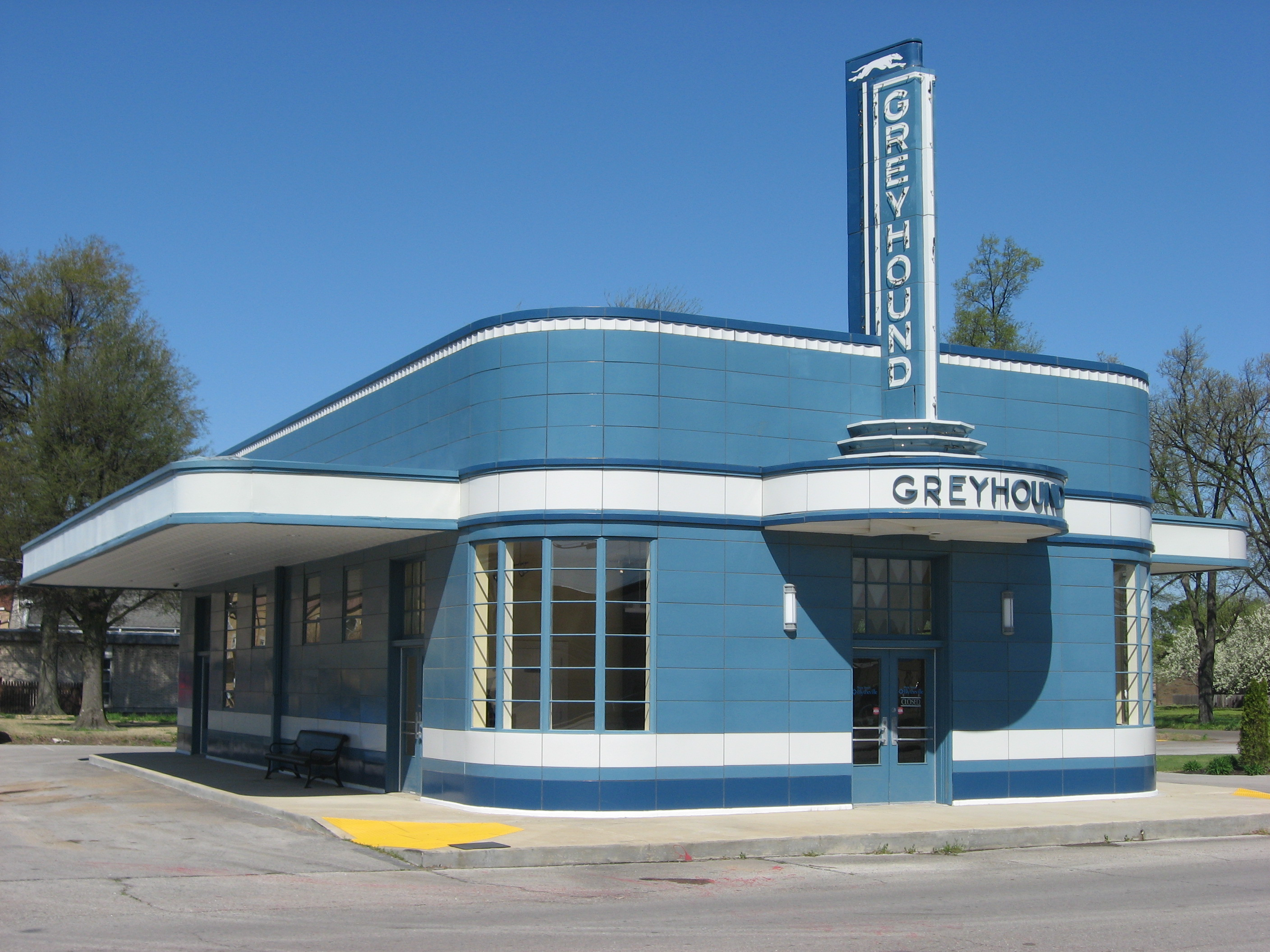
The Greyhound Bus Station is one of eight sites in Blytheville listed on the National Register of Historic Places

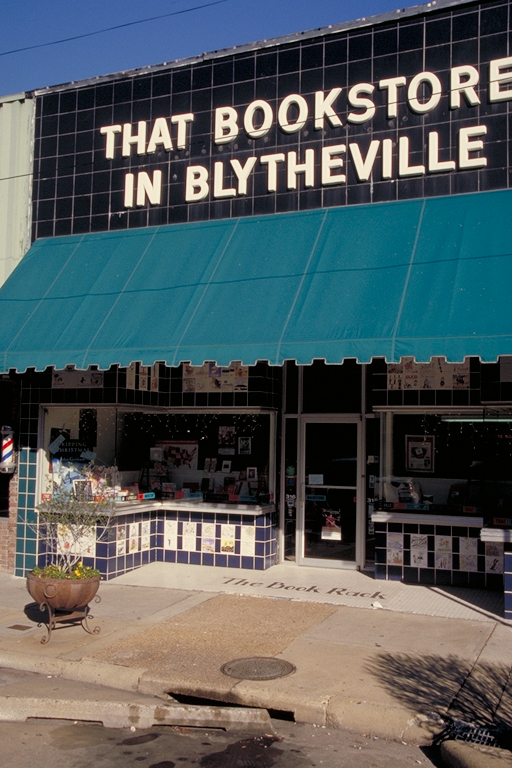
That Bookstore in Blytheville

Blytheville Public Schools serves the majority of the city. The schools include:

- Blytheville Primary School (K-2)
- Blytheville Elementary School (3–5)
- Blytheville Middle School (6–8)
- Blytheville High School (9–12)

Other portions of the city limits are zoned to Armorel Public Schools and Gosnell Public Schools. The former operates Armorel High School and the latter operates Gosnell High School. In addition KIPP Delta operates the KIPP Delta Blytheville Charter School.

A Catholic school, Immaculate Conception School, operated in Blytheville until its 2007 closure.

Blytheville is home to Arkansas Northeastern College (formerly Mississippi County Community College until its merger with Cotton Boll Technical Institute). It offers a two-year program, and is the United States' first community college with a solar photovoltaic prototype facility.

== Infrastructure ==
Highways include: Interstate 55, U.S. Route 61, U.S. Route 78, Highway 18, Highway 137, Highway 151, Highway 239, and Highway 239 Spur.

The Heartland Division of the Burlington Northern Santa Fe Railroad runs through downtown Blytheville.

== Notable people ==
- Julie Adams, film and television actress; grew up in Blytheville
- Fred Akers, football coach for the University of Texas Longhorns and Purdue Boilermakers; Blytheville native
- Lawrence Babits, archaeologist
- M. C. Burton Jr., professional basketball player and medical doctor
- Marvin Childers, state representative from Mississippi County from 2001 to 2006
- Dee Clark, R&B singer known for his 1961 hit "Raindrops"; native of Blytheville
- Kimberly Derrick, short track speed skater and Olympic bronze medal winner
- Al Feldstein, Mad magazine editor; wrote a science fiction story set in Blytheville
- Bob Fisher, president of Belmont University from 2000 to 2021
- George Hamilton, actor and grandson of Blytheville physician C.C. Stevens; spent his boyhood in Blytheville
- Eric Hill, professional football player
- Nannerl O. Keohane, former president of Duke University; born in Blytheville
- Edgar H. Lloyd, World War II Medal of Honor recipient
- Bill Michael, head football coach at University of Texas at El Paso from 1977 to 1981
- Jermey Parnell, football player
- Cecil A. Partee, Chicago treasurer and the first African-American to serve as president of the Illinois State Senate and Cook County's State Attorney
- Nick Symmonds, Olympic track and field runner; born in Blytheville
- Jeff Taylor, professional basketball player
- Whiquitta Tobar, former college basketball player and lawyer
- Trent Tomlinson, country music artist
- Michael Utley, award-winning composer and singer; graduate of Blytheville High School
- Junior Walker, R&B singer and saxophonist
- Kathy Webb, member of Arkansas House of Representatives
- Ruth Whitaker, Arkansas state senator
- Barry Williamson, chairman of Texas Railroad Commission
- Jon Woods, Arkansas state senator and musician; spent part of his childhood in Blytheville
