= National Register of Historic Places listings in Pemiscot County, Missouri =

Location of Pemiscot County in Missouri

This is a list of the National Register of Historic Places listings in Pemiscot County, Missouri.

This is intended to be a complete list of the properties and districts on the National Register of Historic Places in Pemiscot County, Missouri, United States. Latitude and longitude coordinates are provided for many National Register properties and districts; these locations may be seen together in a map.

There are 8 properties and districts listed on the National Register in the county.

This National Park Service list is complete through NPS recent listings posted March 14, 2025.

== Current listings ==
	Name on the Register	Image	Date listed	Location	City or town	Description
1	Campbell Archeological Site	Campbell Archeological Site	July 24, 1974 (#74001086)	Eastern side of New Franklin Ditch, across from Cooter; 36°02′42″N 89°47′51″W	Cooter	
2	Caruthersville Water Tower	Caruthersville Water Tower	September 9, 1982 (#82003156)	W. 3rd St. 36°11′40″N 89°39′29″W	Caruthersville	
3	Delmo Community Center		January 15, 2009 (#08001323)	1 Delmo St. 36°19′55″N 89°49′30″W	Homestown	
4	Delta Center Mound		July 24, 1974 (#74001087)	Address Restricted	Portageville	
5	Denton Mound and Village Archeological Site		July 29, 1969 (#69000120)	Address Restricted	Denton	
6	Murphy Mound Archeological Site	Murphy Mound Archeological Site	May 21, 1969 (#69000119)	3 miles (4.8 km) southwest of Caruthersville; 36°09′10″N 89°41′40″W	Caruthersville	
7	J.M. Wallace Archeological Site		December 2, 1970 (#70000343)	Address Restricted	Wardell	
8	United States Highway 61 Arch	United States Highway 61 Arch	October 28, 2001 (#01001177)	U.S. Route 61; 35°59′58″N 89°53′54″W	Holland	Extends into Mississippi County, Arkansas

== See also ==
- List of National Historic Landmarks in Missouri
- National Register of Historic Places listings in Missouri
