= Vicksburg =

Vicksburg most commonly refers to:

- Vicksburg, Mississippi, a city in western Mississippi, United States
- Vicksburg campaign, an American Civil War campaign
- Siege of Vicksburg, an American Civil War battle

Vicksburg is also the name of some places in the United States:

- Vicksburg, Arizona
- Vicksburg, Colorado, a ghost mining community listed on the National Register of Historic Places
- Vicksburg, Florida, a ghost town
- Vicksburg, Indiana
- Vicksburg, Michigan
- Vicksburg, Minnesota
- Vicksburg, Missouri
- Vicksburg, Blair County, Pennsylvania
- Vicksburg, Union County, Pennsylvania
- Vicksburg National Military Park

== Vessels ==
- USS Vicksburg, several warships
