= Arkansas Highway 137 =

Highway in Arkansas

Highway 137

Route information
- Maintained by ArDOT
- Length: 8.82 mi (14.19 km)
- Existed: 1930–present

Major junctions
- West end: AR 312 in Armorel
- East end: Route K / Route NN at the Missouri state line near Tyler, MO

Location
- Country: United States
- State: Arkansas
- Counties: Mississippi

Highway system
- Arkansas Highway System; Interstate; US; State; Business; Spurs; Suffixed; Scenic; Heritage
← AR 136	→ AR 138

Highway 137 (AR 137, Ark. 137, and Hwy. 137) is a north–south state highway in Mississippi County, Arkansas. The route runs 8.82 miles (14.19 km) from Highway 312 north to the Missouri state line.

== Route description ==
Highway 137 begins east of Blytheville and runs east from Highway 312. The route serves as the northern terminus for its spur route before turning due north at Hickman. After serving as the eastern terminus for Highway 150, the route continues north along the Mississippi River until terminating at MO-SSR-K/NN at the Missouri state line. The road is a two-lane, undivided, rural route for its entire length.

== History ==
The route became a state highway in 1930, running from Highway 18 north to the Mississippi River. Highway 137 was a gravel/stone route of 7.1 miles (11.4 km) in length. Highway 150 was added to the system around 1940, and the two routes both ended at Huffman. Highway 137 was first paved in 1951, and extended north to Missouri in 1958. The highway was rerouted west to Highway 312 upon the creation of Highway 137S in 1996.

== Major intersections ==
The entire route is in Mississippi County.

Location	mi	km	Destinations	Notes
	0.0	0.0	AR 312 – Blytheville	
	1.52	2.45	AR 137S south – Armorel	AR 137S southern terminus
Huffman	5.52	8.88	AR 150 west – Number Nine	AR 150 eastern terminus
	8.82	14.19	Route K / Route NN – Tyler, Cooter	Continuation beyond Missouri state line
1.000 mi = 1.609 km; 1.000 km = 0.621 mi

== Armorel spur ==
Highway 137S
- Location: Armorel
- Length: 2.43 mi (3.91 km)
- Existed: January 31, 1996–November 5, 2014

Arkansas Highway 137 Spur is a former spur route serving Armorel. The route was 2.43 miles (3.91 km) in length and connects Highway 137 and Highway 18 within Armorel.

=== Major intersections ===
The entire route was in Mississippi County.

Location	mi	km	Destinations	Notes
	0.00	0.00	AR 137	Northern terminus
Armorel	2.43	3.91	AR 18	Southern terminus
1.000 mi = 1.609 km; 1.000 km = 0.621 mi

== See also ==
- List of state highways in Arkansas
