= Arkansas Highway 312 =

Highway in Arkansas

Highway 312

Route information
- Maintained by ArDOT
- Existed: April 24, 1963–present

Section 1
- Length: 4.94 mi (7.95 km)
- West end: AR 18 at Dearman
- East end: US 61 / Great River Road

Section 2
- Length: 2.09 mi (3.36 km)
- West end: AR 239
- East end: AR 151

Section 3
- Length: 4.48 mi (7.21 km)
- West end: AR 18
- East end: AR 150 at Number Nine

Location
- Country: United States
- State: Arkansas
- Counties: Mississippi

Highway system
- Arkansas Highway System; Interstate; US; State; Business; Spurs; Suffixed; Scenic; Heritage
← AR 311	→ AR 313

Highway 312 (AR 312, Ark. 312, and Hwy. 312) is a designation for three east–west state highways in northern Mississippi County, Arkansas. Two highways are rural, two-lane highways connecting agricultural areas around Blytheville. A third route runs in Blytheville as a city street. The highways were established during a ten-year period, beginning in 1963, and have remained unchanged since establishment. All routes are maintained by the Arkansas Department of Transportation (ArDOT).

== Route description ==
All three routes are low-traffic two-lane roads in northern Mississippi County. The county is located in the Arkansas Delta, a flat alluvial plain known for fertile soils near the Mississippi River.

=== Dearman to US 61 ===
Highway 312 begins at Highway 18 at Dearman between Dell and Blytheville. The highway runs south before turning due east, passing farmhouses and agricultural fields before passing over Interstate 55 (I-55), without an intersection. East of the bridge, Highway 312 terminates at an intersection with US 61 and the Great River Road. As of 2016, the route had an annual average daily traffic (AADT) of 1,700 vehicles per day (VPD).

=== Blytheville ===
Highway 312 begins at Highway 239 (Ruddle Road) in Blytheville as Promise Land Road, named for the nearby unincorporated community of Promised Land. The highway runs due east as a section line road, passing over I-55 without an intersection before straddling the southern city limits. Highway 312 continues east to intersect Highway 151, where it terminates. As of 2016, the route had an AADT of 420 VPD.

=== Armorel to Number Nine ===
Highway 312 begins at Highway 18 east of Blytheville near Armorel. Though the highways is almost entirely north–south, it is signed east–west in keeping with Arkansas's numbering convention for even-numbered highways. The highway runs north to serve as the southern terminus of Highway 137, before terminating at an intersection with Highway 150 near Number Nine. As of 2016, the route had an AADT of 4,800 VPD near the southern terminus, and 1,200 VPD near the northern terminus.

== History ==
Highway 312 was created by the Arkansas State Highway Commission (ASHC) between Dearman and US 61 on April 24, 1963. The Blytheville segment was created June 23, 1965. A third segment was created pursuant to Act 9 of 1973 by the Arkansas General Assembly. The act directed county judges and legislators to designate up to 12 miles (19 km) of county roads as state highways in each county.

== Major intersections ==
The entire route is in Mississippi County.

Location	mi	km	Destinations	Notes
Dearman	0.00	0.00	US 78 / AR 18 – Manila, Blytheville	Western terminus
	4.94	7.95	US 61 / Great River Road – Blytheville, Osceola	Eastern terminus
Gap in route
Blytheville	0.00	0.00	AR 239 (Ruddle Road)	Western terminus
Blytheville	2.09	3.36	AR 151 (Promised Land Road)	Eastern terminus
Gap in route
	0.00	0.00	AR 18 to I-55 / US 78 – Barfield, Blytheville	Western terminus
	1.68	2.70	AR 137 north – Hickman	AR 137 southern terminus
Number Nine	4.48	7.21	AR 150 – Yarbro, Huffman	Eastern terminus
1.000 mi = 1.609 km; 1.000 km = 0.621 mi

== See also ==
- List of state highways in Arkansas
