= Pemiscot =

Pemiscot may refer to the following places in the United States:

- Pemiscot County, Missouri
- Pemiscot Township, Pemiscot County, Missouri
