= Churchill, Renville County, Minnesota =

Churchill
- former unincorporated community
- Location within Minnesota Location within the United States
- Coordinates: 44°49′06″N 94°40′15″W
- Country: United States
- State: Minnesota
- County: Renville
- Elevation: 1,086 ft (331 m)
- Time zone: UTC-6 (Central (CST))
  - Summer (DST): UTC-5 (CDT)
- Area code: 320
- GNIS feature ID: 641221

Churchill was an unincorporated community in Renville County, Minnesota, United States.

Formerly a rail settlement and the site of an early 20th century Methodist church, a creamery, the Brookfield Township Hall, and a school, the village was hit by a major storm in 1904, which destroyed several buildings.

== Geography ==
Churchill was in Sections 26, 27, 34, and 35 of Brookfield Township. The community was located north of Hector, Minnesota on the Chicago, Milwaukee, and St. Paul Railway (CMStP).

== History ==
=== Early years ===
The area has been called both Churchill and Church Hill in historic sources.

In April 1876, a Methodist Episcopal Sunday school was organized in this area, originally under the name Brookfield, the name of the township. The congregation met in local homes and schools for many years. In September 1901, the church building was dedicated. Circa 1916, the pastor for the church in nearby Hector also served as the pastor for this congregation. The name first appears as Churchill United Methodist Church in 1922. The church was built in the Gothic Revival style.

=== 20th century ===
By the early 20th century, Churchill was considered a "settlement". It was later regarded as a village: one of over a dozen small hamlets in Renville County.

Neil J. McCall, an early settler from Cornwall in Canada, helped organize the Churchill United Methodist Church; he was also involved in building the Churchill creamery. Thomas Simmons, another settler from Canada, was the secretary for the creamery. In addition to the church and creamery, Church Hill had a school.

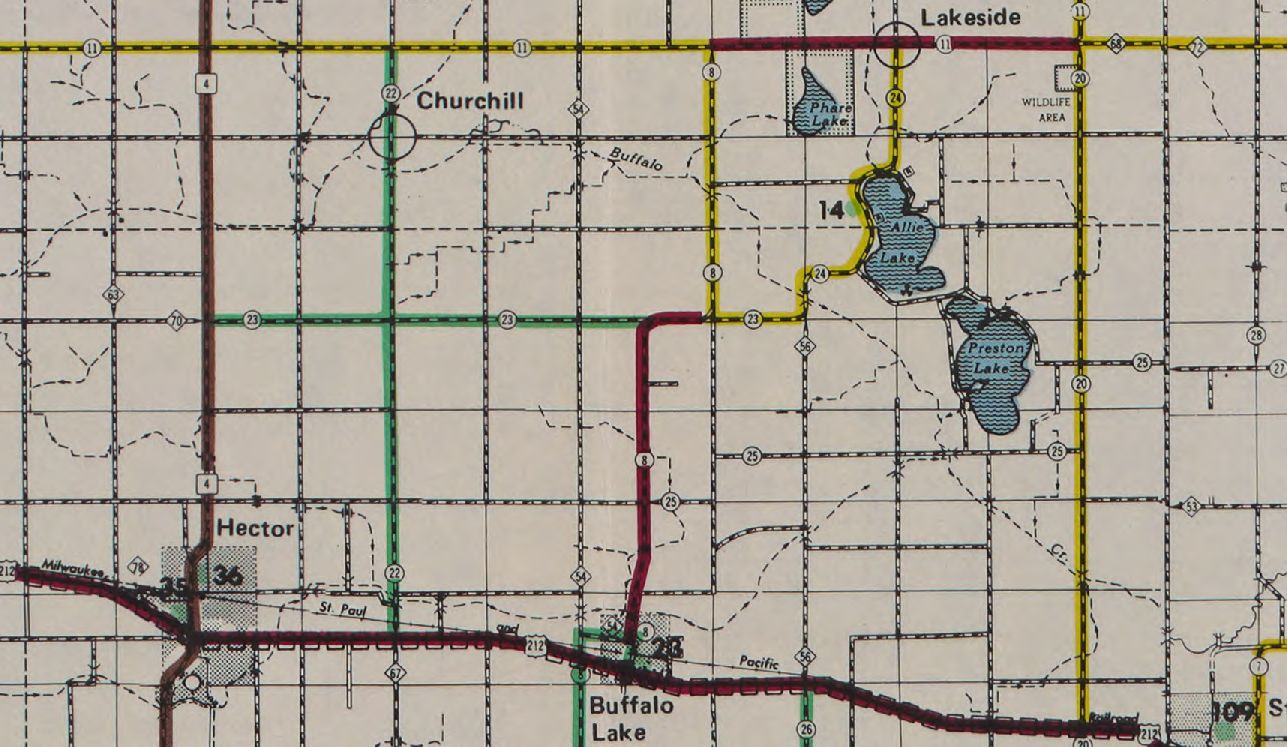
Community of Churchill, near Hector, Buffalo Lake, and Lakeside in Renville County, in 1981

On August 23, 1904, a heavy storm hit Church Hill and surrounding areas. The sheds of the Methodist Church in Church Hill were destroyed. Nearby homes, granaries, and barns were also destroyed, as well as livestock, grain, and farming equipment. The storm was severe enough to make state news. The Minneapolis Journal wrote, "At Church Hill, the wind blew the Methodist Church sheds to pieces. Just north, John Silker's barn was blown to bits, and east, M. Southers' large barn was blown from its large foundation and twisted." At some area farms, not a single building was left. After damaging the Church Hill area, the storm moved on to Boon Lake Township, where it caused further damage.

In 1960, the Brookfield Township Hall, located in Churchill, burned to the ground. The town hall, which had previously served as the schoolhouse, was destroyed, but a road grader inside the structure was spared when several farmers pulled it out using a tractor.

Churchill United Methodist Church held its closing service December 30, 1979. The congregation merged with the nearby Hector United Methodist Church. That year, the church was purchased by the Renville County Historical Society for $1.

=== 21st century ===
In 2008, the Churchill Methodist Church was featured in Churches of Minnesota, a book published by the Minnesota Historical Society. That same year, the Renville Historical Society announced plans to relinquish their duties as caretakers of the church building, which had fallen into disrepair. The plan was to raze the building. The Methodist Church was "the last standing structure from what once was the village of Churchill." The Churchill Methodist Church remains standing.

In 2016, Churchill was mentioned in the Renville County Messenger, in a list of former villages of Renville County; other villages included Beaver Falls, Bechyn, and Florita, among others. The article stated that these small Renville County villages could not compete with the larger towns after the introduction of free mail delivery.

The Minnesota Department of Transportation estimated in 2023 that Churchill has a population of 20. In 2025, the Twin Cities Pioneer Press in the Minneapolis-St Paul metro area announced that the Renville Historical Society was still looking for a buyer for the church, which is the last remaining original building in the ghost town of Churchill.

The Churchill Cemetery is located at 44°49′10.5″N 94°40′51.4″W, just west of Churchill.

== See also ==
- Vicksburg, Minnesota
