= Fourteen Bend, Missouri =

Extinct hamlet in Missouri, U.S.

Coordinates: 36.2803449°N 89.5889669°W

Fourteen Bend is an extinct town in Pemiscot County, in the U.S. state of Missouri.

Fourteen Bend was so named on account of the community's location near the fourteenth major meander on the Mississippi River going downstream from Cairo, Illinois.
