= Gobler, Missouri =

Unincorporated community in Missouri, U.S.

Coordinates: 36°09′22″N 89°57′33″W

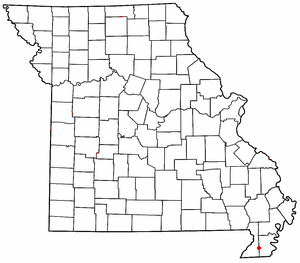

Gobler (/ˈɡɒblər/ GOB-lər) is an unincorporated community on the border between Dunklin and Pemiscot counties in the U.S. state of Missouri. It is located nineteen miles west-southwest of Caruthersville and seven miles southeast of Kennett. The community is on Missouri Route NN and the old St. Louis Southwestern Railway line which is now Dunklin County Road 710.

It still has a post office open two hours a day, six days a week. Until a devastating fire in 1956, Gobler was the home of the Gobler Mercantile Company, a large general store established in 1937 that served the surrounding farming population.

The community is in the Delta C-7 consolidated school district, headquartered six miles northeast at Deering. Until 1963, Gobler was the site of the predecessor consolidated District C-6's segregated elementary school for African American students.

== Demographics ==
Historical population
Census	Pop.	Note	%±
1950	116		—
1960	78		−32.8%
1970	73		−6.4%
Missouri Census Data Center
