= Mid-City =

Mid-City, Mid City or Midcity may refer to:

== Albums ==
- Midcity (album) by Clipping

== Places ==
=== Australia ===
- MidCity, a shopping centre in Sydney

=== United States ===
- Mid-City, Los Angeles, California
- Mid-City New Orleans, Louisiana
- Mid-Cities, Dallas-Fort Worth, Texas
- Mid City, Missouri, an unincorporated community
- Midcity, Texas, an unincorporated community
- MidCity District, a retail development center in Huntsville, Alabama
- Mid-City Industrial, Minneapolis, Minnesota

== See also ==
- Mid-Wilshire, Los Angeles, California
