= Concord Township, Pemiscot County, Missouri =

Inactive township in the US state of Missouri

Coordinates: 36.2822780°N 89.6728874°W

Concord Township is an inactive township in Pemiscot County, in the U.S. state of Missouri.

Concord Township takes its name from the community of Concord, Pemiscot County, Missouri.
