= Armorel High School =

Public high school in Blytheville, Arkansas

Location
- 4555 North State Highway 137; Blytheville, Arkansas 72315; United States; 35°55′02″N 89°47′58″W

Information
- School type: Public (government funded)
- Status: Open
- School district: Armorel School District
- NCES District ID: 0502550
- Authority: Arkansas Department of Education (ADE)
- Superintendent: Tiffany Morgan
- CEEB code: 040055
- NCES School ID: 050255000027
- Teaching staff: 33.39 (FTE)
- Grades: 7–12
- Enrollment: 204 (2025-2026)
- Student to teacher ratio: 5.90
- Education system: ADE Smart Core curriculum
- Campus type: Rural
- Colors: Black and Texas orange
- Athletics conference: 1A 3 East (2012–14)
- Mascot: Tiger
- Team name: Armorel Tigers
- Feeder schools: Armorel Elementary School
- Affiliation: Arkansas Activities Association
- Website: www.armorel.k12.ar.us/page/high-school

Armorel High School is a comprehensive public high school serving students in grades seven through twelve in the rural community of Armorel, Arkansas, United States. It is the one of seven public high schools located in Mississippi County, Arkansas and the only high school administered by Armorel School District. A portion of Blytheville is zoned to Armorel High.

== Demographics ==
As of 2026, Armorel High School has a student population of 204 that is 2.5% Asian, 7.8% Hispanic, 8.8% black, and 80.9% white. The school's graduation rate is 90%.

== Academics ==
This Title I school is accredited by the Arkansas Department of Education (ADE) with accreditation under advisement with AdvancED since 2004.

The assumed course of study follows the Smart Core curriculum developed the Arkansas Department of Education (ADE), which requires students to complete at least 22 credit units before graduation. Students engage in regular (core) and career focus courses and exams and may select Advanced Placement (AP) coursework and exams that may lead to college credit.

== Athletics ==
The Armorel Tigers participate in various interscholastic activities in the 1A Classification (the state's smallest classification) within the 1A 3 East Conference administered by the Arkansas Activities Association. Armorel's athletic activities include basketball (boys/girls), cheer, golf (boys/girls), baseball, softball, and track and field (boys/girls). Additionally, in 2018-2019 Armorel will field its first-ever AAA varsity swimming team.

== Notable alumni ==
- Perry Adkisson, former Chancellor of the Texas A&M University System
