= Arkansas Highway 150 =

State highway in Arkansas, United States

Highway 150
- AR 150 highlighted in red, AR 150S highlighted in blue

Route information
- Maintained by ArDOT
- Length: 14.19 mi (22.84 km)

Major junctions
- West end: AR 181 near Gosnell
- US 61; I-55
- East end: AR 137 at Huffman

Location
- Country: United States
- State: Arkansas
- Counties: Mississippi

Highway system
- Arkansas Highway System; Interstate; US; State; Business; Spurs; Suffixed; Scenic; Heritage
← AR 149	→ AR 151

Highway 150 (AR 150, Ark. 150, and Hwy. 150) is a 14.19-mile-long (22.84 km) east–west state highway in Mississippi County, Arkansas. The route runs from Highway 181 north of Gosnell east across US Route 61 (US 61) and Interstate 55 (I-55) to Highway 137 at Huffman.

== Route description ==
Highway 150 begins at Highway 181 north of Gosnell and the Arkansas International Airport. The highway has a spur route that serves as a shortcut to travelers looking for US 61 southbound and later intersects and begins a concurrency near Yarbro. After the concurrency ends, Highway 150 intersects Interstate 55 at exit 71. East of this junction the route meets Highway 321 before terminating at Highway 137 at Huffman.

== Major intersections ==
Mile markers reset at concurrencies. The entire route is in Mississippi County.

Location	mi	km	Destinations	Notes
	0.00	0.00	AR 181	Western terminus
Yarbro	3.27	5.26	AR 150S south	
	3.73	6.00	US 61 south – Blytheville	
US 61 concurrency north, 0.1 miles (0.16 km)
	0.00	0.00	US 61 north – Hayti MO	
	1.52	2.45	I-55 – Blytheville, St. Louis, MO	I-55 exit 71
	4.91	7.90	AR 312 west	
Huffman	10.46	16.83	AR 137 – Tyler MO, Cooter MO	
1.000 mi = 1.609 km; 1.000 km = 0.621 mi

=== Yarbro spur ===
Highway 150S
- Location: Yarbro
- Length: 0.45 mi (720 m)

Highway 150 Spur (AR 150S, Ark. 150S, and Hwy. 150S) is a north–south state highway spur route at Yarbro. The route of 0.45 miles (0.72 km) serves to connect travelers on Highway 150 to US 61 heading south.

Major intersections

The entire route is in Mississippi County.

Location	mi	km	Destinations	Notes
Yarbro	0.00	0.00	AR 150	Northern terminus
	0.45	0.72	US 61	Southern terminus
1.000 mi = 1.609 km; 1.000 km = 0.621 mi
