= Senator Banks =

Senator Banks may refer to:

- Jim Banks (born 1979), U.S. Senator from Indiana
- A. Bleecker Banks (1835–1910), New York State Senate
- J. B. Banks (died 2003), Missouri State Senate
- Nathaniel P. Banks (1816–1894), Massachusetts State Senate
- Tommy Banks (musician), (1936–2018), Canadian Senator from Alberta
