= Marvin Childers =

American politician

Marvin Lynn Childers

State Representative for Mississippi County, Arkansas
- In office January 1, 2001 – December 31, 2006

Personal details
- Born: 1961 (age 64–65) Reared in Cooter; Pemiscot County; Bootheel of Missouri, USA
- Party: Republican
- Spouse: Charisse L. Childers
- Education: University of Mississippi; University of Mississippi School of Law
- Occupation: Attorney; Lobbyist

Marvin Lynn Childers (born 1961) is an attorney from Little Rock, Arkansas, who is the president and chief lobbyist of the interest group, the Poultry Federation, which serves producers in Arkansas, Missouri, and Oklahoma. A Republican, Childers served in the Arkansas House of Representatives from 2001 to 2006 from Blytheville in Mississippi County in the eastern Arkansas.

Childers was reared on a family farm in rural Cooter in Pemiscot County in the Bootheel of Missouri, where his family grew more than two thousand acres of such crops as cotton, wheat, soybeans, and milo. He received a Bachelor of Arts in Accounting from the University of Mississippi at Oxford and his Juris Doctor degree from the University of Mississippi School of Law. Childers is a member of the Little Rock firm Friday, Eldredge & Clark; while in Blytheville, he engaged in the practice of law with Burrow, Harlan and Childers. He is a member of the Arkansas, Missouri, and Pulaski County bar associations.

In 2013, Childers was named "Industry Leader of the Year" by poultry and egg executives

In late May 2013, Childers said that he is considering seeking the Republican nomination in 2014 for Attorney General of Arkansas. Current Attorney General Dustin McDaniel, a Democrat, is term-limited. Already in the GOP race are David Sterling, a conservative attorney from North Little Rock, and Leslie Rutledge, originally from Batesville in Independence County, who was legal counsel to Republican former Governor Mike Huckabee.

Childers resides in Little Rock with his wife, Charisse L. Childers (born 1966), who holds a Ph.D. in public policy from the University of Arkansas at Fayetteville and is the executive director of Accelerate Arkansas.
