= Netherlands, Missouri =

Unincorporated community in Pemiscot County, in the U.S. state of Missouri

Coordinates: 36°17′57″N 89°45′04″W

Netherlands is an unincorporated community located within the Township of Concord, in Pemiscot County, in the U.S. state of Missouri.

== History ==
A post office called Netherlands was in operation from 1915 until 1957. The community was named after Wood Netherlands, a land agent who was interested in buying fields in the rural area the CDP is in.
