= Yarbro, Arkansas =

- Unincorporated community
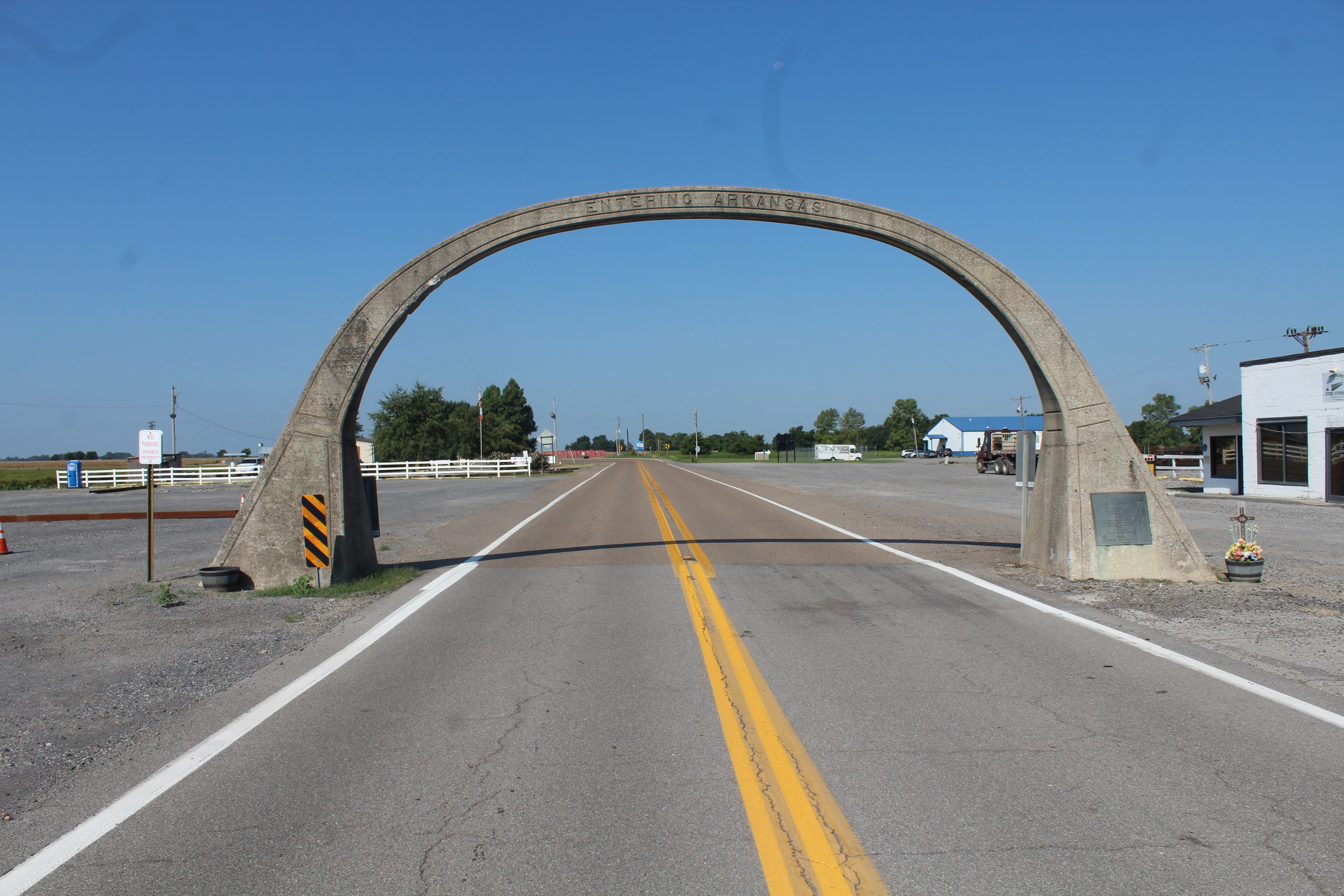
- United States Highway 61 Arch near Yarbro

- Location within Arkansas
- Coordinates: 35°58′45″N 89°54′37″W
- Country: United States
- State: Arkansas
- County: Mississippi
- Elevation: 253 ft (77 m)
- Time zone: UTC-6 (Central (CST))
  - Summer (DST): UTC-5 (CDT)
- Area code: 870
- GNIS feature ID: 56583

Yarbro is an unincorporated community in Mississippi County, Arkansas, United States.

== Description ==
Yarbro is around 1 mile (1.6 km) south of the Missouri border and about 3 miles (4.8 km) north of Blytheville.

U.S. Route 61 and Arkansas Highway 150 intersect in Yarbro. A Route 61 overpass across St. Louis–San Francisco Railway track was built by the Bureau of Public Roads in 1939, and was listed on the National Register of Historic Places in 2022. The nearby United States Highway 61 Arch is also listed on the Register.

The town was first settled in 1885 and was known as "Steal Easy" due to the large cattle population of the town and its proximity to the state border. When a post office opened in the community on March 22, 1900, the town was officially named Yarbro, after a local settler family. By 1912, the town was home to three general merchandise and grocery stores, a post office, a barbershop, a restaurant, a pool hall, a train station, a blacksmith shop, a boarding house, a stave mill, a Methodist church, a school, two gins, and a bank. The post office closed in 1926. Home to a two-room schoolhouse, Yarbro became part of the Blytheville School District in 1942.
