= Gibson, Pemiscot County, Missouri =

Unincorporated community in Missouri, U.S.

Coordinates: 36°07′04″N 89°50′42″W

Gibson is an unincorporated community in Pemiscot County, in the U.S. state of Missouri.

The community once contained a schoolhouse called Gibson School, which is now defunct. The community and schoolhouse took their names from the nearby Gibson Bayou creek, which in turn was named after Newberry Gibson, an original owner of the site.
