= Pemiscot Township, Pemiscot County, Missouri =

Inactive township in the US state of Missouri

Coordinates: 36.0550°N 89.7378°W

Pemiscot Township is an inactive township in Pemiscot County, in the U.S. state of Missouri.

Pemiscot Township took its name from Pemiscot Bayou, a former creek within its borders.
