= Kinfolks Ridge, Missouri =

Unincorporated community in Missouri, U.S.

Coordinates: 36°07′27″N 89°38′42″W

Kinfolks Ridge is an unincorporated community in Pemiscot County, in the U.S. state of Missouri.

Kinfolks Ridge was so named for the fact a large share of the early settlers in this community were related.
