= Shade, Missouri =

Unincorporated community in Missouri, U.S.

Coordinates: 36°10′32″N 89°46′00″W

Shade is an unincorporated community in Pemiscot County, in the U.S. state of Missouri.

The community has the name of E. W. Shade, a local businessman.
