= Stubtown, Missouri =

Unincorporated community in Missouri

Coordinates: 36°10′34″N 89°41′57″W

Stubtown is an unincorporated community in Pemiscot County, in the U.S. state of Missouri.

== History ==
A variant name was "Game". A post office called Game was established in 1898, and remained in operation until 1911. The present name honors the local Stubbs family.
