= Acorn Corner, Missouri =

Unincorporated community in Missouri, U.S.

Coordinates: 36°05′18″N 89°46′14″W

Acorn Corner is an unincorporated community in Pemiscot County, in the U.S. state of Missouri.

== History ==
The community once contained Acorn Corner School, now defunct. The schoolhouse was named for a grove of acorn-bearing oak trees near the original town site.
