= New Survey, Missouri =

Unincorporated community in Missouri

New Survey
- Unincorporated community
- Location within the state of Missouri
- Coordinates: 36°06′12″N 89°54′50″W
- Country: United States
- State: Missouri
- County: Pemiscot
- Time zone: UTC-6 (Central (CST))
  - Summer (DST): UTC-5 (CDT)
- GNIS feature ID: 723319

New Survey is an unincorporated community in Pemiscot County, in the U.S. state of Missouri.

New Survey was laid out in the 1910s in accordance with a new county survey, hence the name.
