= Cunningham, Pemiscot County, Missouri =

Unincorporated community in Missouri, U.S.

Coordinates: 36°11′49″N 89°42′01″W

Cunningham is an unincorporated community in Pemiscot County, in the U.S. state of Missouri.

Cunningham was founded in 1902 when the railroad was extended to that point. The community has the name of Frank Cunningham, a railroad man.
