= Gayoso, Missouri =

Unincorporated community in Missouri, U.S.

Coordinates: 36°15′22″N 89°42′18″W

Gayoso is an unincorporated community in Pemiscot County, in the U.S. state of Missouri.

== History ==
A post office called Gayoso was established in 1854, and remained in operation until 1900. The community was named after Don Miguel Gayoso de Lamos, a Spanish colonial politician.
