= Covington, Missouri =

Unincorporated community in Missouri

Coordinates: 36°06′26″N 89°52′40″W

Covington is an unincorporated community in Virginia township in Pemiscot County, in the U.S. state of Missouri.

== History ==
A post office called Covington was established in 1877, and remained in operation until 1912. The community was named after the original owner of the site.
