= Delmo Community Center =

- U.S. National Register of Historic Places
- Location within Missouri Location within the United States
- Location: 1 Delmo St., Homestown, Missouri
- Coordinates: 36°19′54″N 89°49′30″W
- Area: 2.8 acres (1.1 ha)
- Built: 1940
- Architect: District 111-Farm Security Admin.
- Architectural style: Side gable utility building
- NRHP reference No.: 08001323
- Added to NRHP: January 15, 2009

Delmo Community Center, also known as South Wardell Utility Building, is a historic community centre located at Homestown, Pemiscot County, Missouri. It was designed and constructed by the Farm Security Administration in 1940 as a utility building for the entire community. It is a long one-story, rectangular, frame building on a concrete foundation. It measures approximately 56 feet by 26 feet and is sheathed in clapboard siding.

It was listed on the National Register of Historic Places in 2009.
