= Hayward, Missouri =

- Census-designated place
- Location of Hayward, Missouri
- Coordinates: 36°23′46″N 89°40′00″W
- Country: United States
- State: Missouri
- County: Pemiscot

Area
  - Total: 0.25 sq mi (0.66 km^{2})
  - Land: 0.25 sq mi (0.66 km^{2})
  - Water: 0 sq mi (0.00 km^{2})
- Elevation: 282 ft (86 m)

Population (2020)
  - Total: 93
  - Density: 367.6/sq mi (141.95/km^{2})
- Time zone: UTC-6 (Central (CST))
  - Summer (DST): UTC-5 (CDT)
- FIPS code: 29-31186
- GNIS feature ID: 2587079

Hayward is a census-designated place and former village in Pemiscot County, Missouri, United States. The population was 93 at the 2020 census.

== History ==
An early variant name was "Fisher", after John J. Fisher, an early settler. A post office called Fisher was established in 1880. The present name is after one Mr. Hayward, another early citizen. A post office called Hayward has been in operation since 1895.

The village disincorporated in 2000. Hayward is now an unincorporated community classified by the Census Bureau as a census-designated place.

== Geography ==
According to the United States Census Bureau, the CDP has a total area of 0.25 square miles (0.65 km^{2}), all land.

== Demographics ==
Historical population
Census	Pop.	Note	%±
2010	131		—
2020	93		−29.0%
U.S. Decennial Census

=== 2010 census ===
As of the census of 2010, there were 131 people, 49 households, and 39 families living in the CDP. The population density was 524.0 inhabitants per square mile (202.3/km^{2}). There were 56 housing units at an average density of 224.0 per square mile (86.5/km^{2}). The racial makeup of the CDP was 99.24% White and 0.76% from two or more races.

There were 49 households, of which 36.7% had children under the age of 18 living with them, 59.2% were married couples living together, 12.2% had a female householder with no husband present, 8.2% had a male householder with no wife present, and 20.4% were non-families. 18.4% of all households were made up of individuals, and 6.1% had someone living alone who was 65 years of age or older. The average household size was 2.67 and the average family size was 2.92.

The median age in the CDP was 38.5 years. 24.4% of residents were under the age of 18; 9.2% were between the ages of 18 and 24; 21.4% were from 25 to 44; 33.6% were from 45 to 64; and 11.5% were 65 years of age or older. The gender makeup of the CDP was 46.6% male and 53.4% female.

=== 2000 census ===
As of the census of 2000, there were 123 people, 45 households, and 31 families living in the town. The population density was 521.2 inhabitants per square mile (201.2/km^{2}). There were 48 housing units at an average density of 203.4 per square mile (78.5/km^{2}). The racial makeup of the town was 100.00% White.

There were 45 households, out of which 26.7% had children under the age of 18 living with them, 68.9% were married couples living together, 2.2% had a female householder with no husband present, and 28.9% were non-families. 24.4% of all households were made up of individuals, and 15.6% had someone living alone who was 65 years of age or older. The average household size was 2.73 and the average family size was 3.16.

In the town the population was spread out, with 24.4% under the age of 18, 10.6% from 18 to 24, 31.7% from 25 to 44, 19.5% from 45 to 64, and 13.8% who were 65 years of age or older. The median age was 37 years. For every 100 females there were 75.7 males. For every 100 females age 18 and over, there were 78.8 males.

The median income for a household in the town was $34,375, and the median income for a family was $43,750. Males had a median income of $29,583 versus $17,031 for females. The per capita income for the town was $12,720. There were no families and 1.6% of the population living below the poverty line, including no under eighteens and 13.3% of those over 64.

== Education ==
It is in the North Pemiscot County R-I School District.

Three Rivers College's service area includes Pemiscot County.
