= Oak Ridge, Pemiscot County, Missouri =

Unincorporated community in Missouri, U.S.

Coordinates: 36°01′48″N 89°50′30″W

Oak Ridge (formerly called Douglas) is an unincorporated community in Pemiscot County, in the U.S. state of Missouri.

== History ==
Oak Ridge was laid out in 1895. Oak Ridge was descriptively on account of the topography of the area. The name of the post office was afterward changed to Douglas in order to avoid repetition with the similarly named town of Oak Ridge, Cape Girardeau, Missouri. A post office called Douglas was established in 1904, and remained in operation until 1922. The name Douglas has since faded from use.
