= Ingram Ridge, Missouri =

Unincorporated community in Missouri, U.S.

Coordinates: 36°17′30″N 89°47′27″W

Ingram Ridge is an unincorporated community in Pemiscot County, in the U.S. state of Missouri.

== History ==
Ingram Ridge derives its name from G. A. Ingram, the original owner of the town site. The small community once had a church, and a cemetery. Its elevation above sea level is 266 feet (81 m). It is located in the eastern part of the Pascola township.
