= Holland, Missouri =

- Town
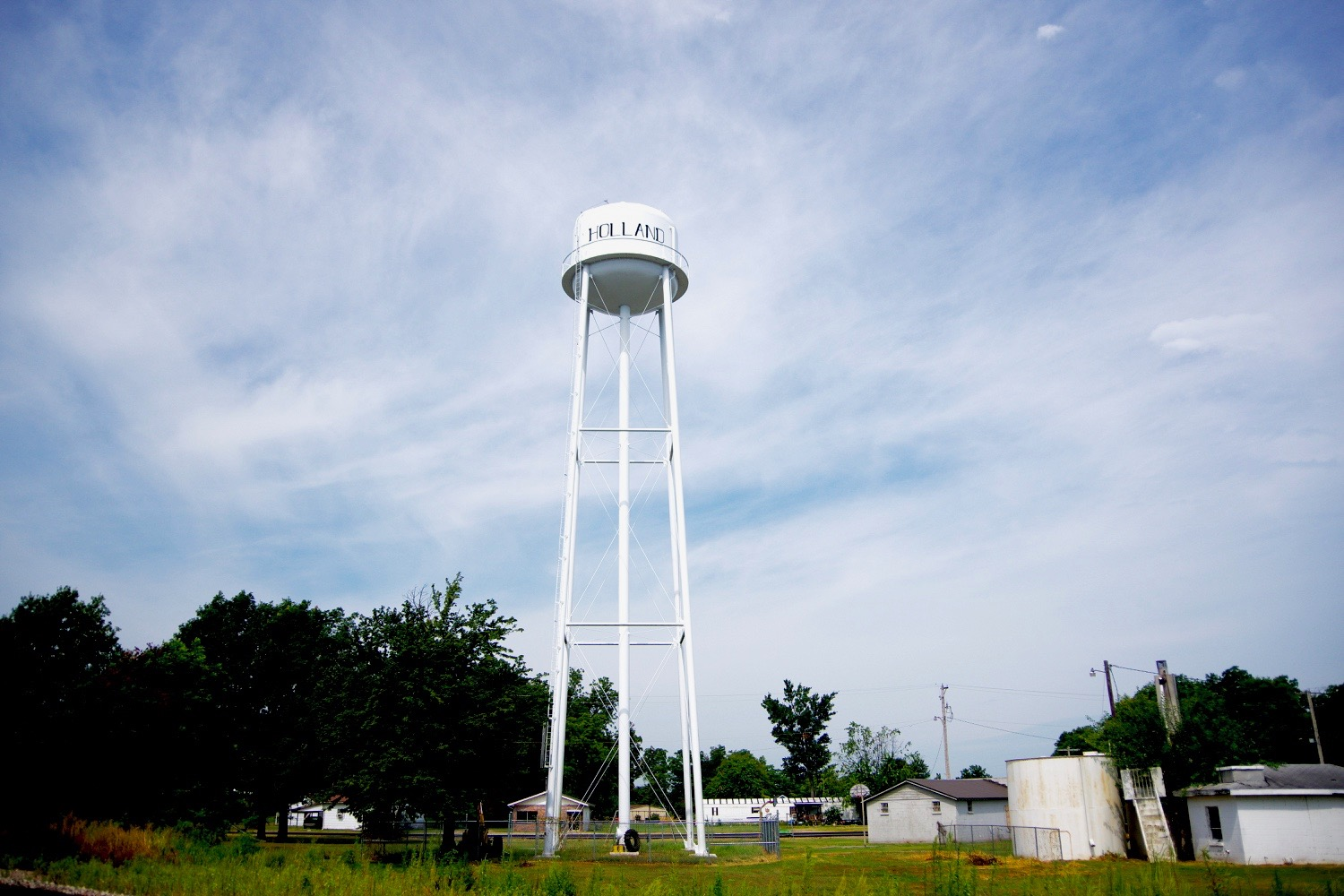
- Water tower in Holland

- Location of Holland, Missouri
- Coordinates: 36°03′25″N 89°52′14″W
- Country: United States
- State: Missouri
- County: Pemiscot

Area
  - Total: 0.17 sq mi (0.43 km^{2})
  - Land: 0.17 sq mi (0.43 km^{2})
  - Water: 0 sq mi (0.00 km^{2})
- Elevation: 256 ft (78 m)

Population (2020)
  - Total: 194
  - Density: 1,163/sq mi (449.1/km^{2})
- Time zone: UTC-6 (Central (CST))
  - Summer (DST): UTC-5 (CDT)
- ZIP code: 63853
- Area code: 573
- FIPS code: 29-32590
- GNIS feature ID: 2396997

Holland is a town in Pemiscot County, Missouri, United States. The population was 194 at the 2020 census.

== History ==
The first permanent settlement at Holland was made in 1871. The area experienced growth with the arrival of the St. Louis–San Francisco Railway in 1901. The town site was platted in 1902, and most likely was named after J. W. Holland, an early settler. A post office called Holland has been in operation since 1900.

== Geography ==
Holland lies a few miles west of the Mississippi River, and just north of the Missouri-Arkansas state line. U.S. Route 61 runs along Holland's southern boundary, connecting the city with Steele to the northeast and Blytheville, Arkansas, to the south. State Route E connects Holland with Cooter to the southeast.

According to the United States Census Bureau, the city has a total area of 0.17 square miles (0.44 km^{2}), all land.

== Demographics ==
Historical population
Census	Pop.	Note	%±
1910	135		—
1920	530		292.6%
1930	289		−45.5%
1940	390		34.9%
1950	409		4.9%
1960	403		−1.5%
1970	329		−18.4%
1980	295		−10.3%
1990	237		−19.7%
2000	246		3.8%
2010	229		−6.9%
2020	194		−15.3%
U.S. Decennial Census

=== 2010 census ===
As of the census of 2010, there were 229 people, 98 households, and 62 families living in the city. The population density was 1,347.1 inhabitants per square mile (520.1/km^{2}). There were 112 housing units at an average density of 658.8 per square mile (254.4/km^{2}). The racial makeup of the city was 93.01% White, 0.44% Native American, 3.49% from other races, and 3.06% from two or more races. Hispanic or Latino of any race were 5.68% of the population.

There were 98 households, of which 27.6% had children under the age of 18 living with them, 42.9% were married couples living together, 14.3% had a female householder with no husband present, 6.1% had a male householder with no wife present, and 36.7% were non-families. 33.7% of all households were made up of individuals, and 13.3% had someone living alone who was 65 years of age or older. The average household size was 2.34 and the average family size was 2.89.

The median age in the city was 42.2 years. 22.7% of residents were under the age of 18; 4.8% were between the ages of 18 and 24; 25.4% were from 25 to 44; 30.2% were from 45 to 64; and 17% were 65 years of age or older. The gender makeup of the city was 55.0% male and 45.0% female.

=== 2000 census ===
As of the census of 2000, there were 246 people, 96 households, and 71 families living in the town. The population density was 1,424.3 inhabitants per square mile (549.9/km^{2}). There were 112 housing units at an average density of 648.5 per square mile (250.4/km^{2}). The racial makeup of the town was 93.90% White, 2.44% African American, 0.41% Native American, 3.25% from other races. Hispanic or Latino of any race were 3.66% of the population.

There were 96 households, out of which 31.3% had children under the age of 18 living with them, 54.2% were married couples living together, 10.4% had a female householder with no husband present, and 26.0% were non-families. 24.0% of all households were made up of individuals, and 12.5% had someone living alone who was 65 years of age or older. The average household size was 2.56 and the average family size was 2.90.

In the town the population was spread out, with 25.2% under the age of 18, 9.3% from 18 to 24, 26.8% from 25 to 44, 21.5% from 45 to 64, and 17.1% who were 65 years of age or older. The median age was 39 years. For every 100 females there were 106.7 males. For every 100 females age 18 and over, there were 104.4 males.

The median income for a household in the town was $35,278, and the median income for a family was $36,875. Males had a median income of $35,417 versus $20,000 for females. The per capita income for the town was $12,524. About 9.8% of families and 12.7% of the population were below the poverty line, including 7.3% of those under the age of eighteen and 21.7% of those 65 or over.

== Education ==
South Pemiscot Schools is the local school district.

Three Rivers College's service area includes Pemiscot County.

== Notable people ==
- Tom York, an American television personality who was born in Holland and worked in Alabama for over 30 years
