= McCarty, Missouri =

Unincorporated community in Missouri, U.S.

Coordinates: 36°07′04″N 89°41′56″W

McCarty is an unincorporated community in Pemiscot County, in the U.S. state of Missouri.

== History ==
McCarty has the name of Judge Sterling H. McCarty, who held a number of county offices. The community once had the McCarty School, but it is now defunct.
