= J. B. Banks =

American politician (1924–2003)

J. B. "Jet" Banks (March 13, 1924 – October 12, 2003) was an American Democratic politician who served in the Missouri Senate and in the Missouri legislature for three decades. Banks, the son of a sharecropper, rose to become state senate majority leader in 1996, making him the highest-ranking Black elected official in the state.

== Biography ==
Born on March 13, 1924, in or near Hermondale, Missouri.

He graduated from Lincoln University with a B.S. degree in mathematics, and later a received a Legum Doctor degree in English. He did graduate work at Saint Louis University and Washington University in St. Louis. Banks also had a Doctor of Humane Letters degree and a Doctor of Laws degree from Harris-Stowe State College (now Harris–Stowe State University) in 1989.

He worked in several different fields including as a real estate appraiser, a real estate broker, the president of construction and developing firms, an insurance underwriter, and an author.

J. Bernard Banks entered the Missouri House of Representatives in 1969. He was elected to the Missouri Senate in 1976. In the 1970s, Banks also led legislation to merge Harris-Stowe, a financially struggling historically black St. Louis College, into the state higher education system. Banks sometimes changed suits several times a day as a way to be flamboyant.

Banks resigned in December 1999 due to ill health, and three months after he pleaded guilty to filing false state income tax returns, a felony for which he was convicted and received five years probation, 300 hours of court-ordered community service, and a prohibition from holding any elected or appointed office while on probation. In 2003, he died at a Las Vegas hospital's emergency room of natural causes at the age of 79.

In 2011, Harris-Stowe named a park after Banks.
