= Armorel School District =

School district in Arkansas

Location
- Armorel, Arkansas United States

District information
- Grades: PK–12
- Accreditation: AdvancED
- Schools: 2
- NCES District ID: 0502550

Students and staff
- Students: 471
- Teachers: 40.19 (on FTE basis)
- Student–teacher ratio: 11.72

Other information
- Website: armorel.k12.ar.us

Armorel School District is a public school district based in Armorel, Arkansas, United States. The Amorel School District provides early childhood, elementary and secondary education for more than 450 prekindergarten through grade 12 students at its four facilities.

Armorel School District is accredited by the Arkansas Department of Education (ADE) with district accreditation under advisement with AdvancED.

A portion of Blytheville is zoned to this district.

== Schools ==
- Armorel High School—grades 7 through 12.
- Armorel Elementary School—prekindergarten through grade 6.
