= Micola, Missouri =

Unincorporated community in Missouri, U.S.

Coordinates: 36°07′54″N 89°47′09″W

Micola is an unincorporated community in Pemiscot County, in the U.S. state of Missouri.

== History ==
Micola was originally called Pokono, and under the latter had its start in 1901 when the railroad was extended to that point. A post office called Micola was established in 1902, and remained in operation until 1926. The present name is a fanciful amalgamation of Michie and Coleman, the surnames of the original owners of the town site.
