= Byron York =

American conservative (born 1955)

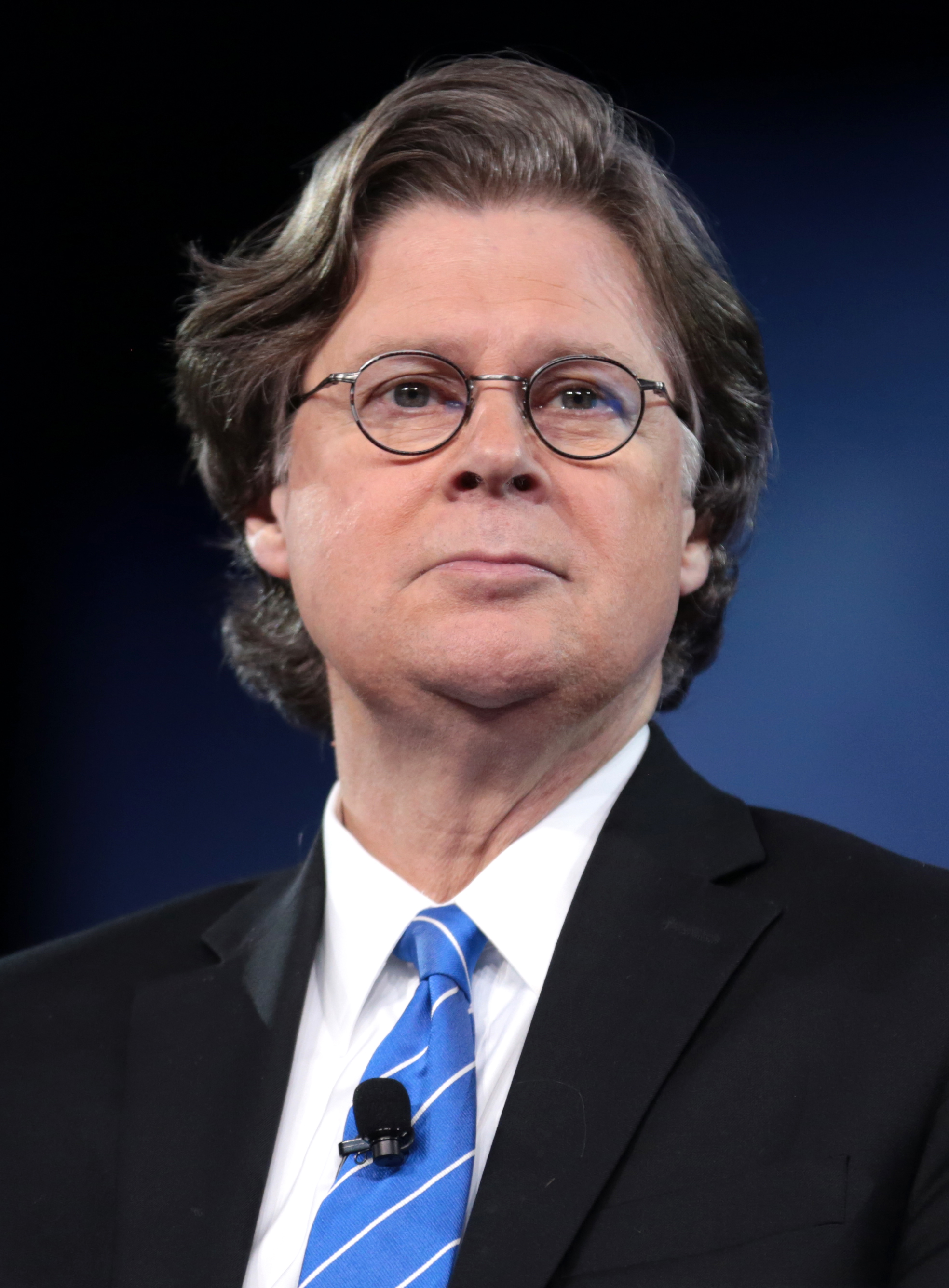
- York in 2017
- Born: December 5, 1955 (age 70); Birmingham, Alabama, U.S.
- Education: University of Alabama (BA); University of Chicago (MA)
- Spouse: 1
- Father: Tom York

Byron York (born December 5, 1955) is an American conservative correspondent, pundit, columnist, and author.

== Education ==
York holds a B.A. from the University of Alabama at Tuscaloosa and an M.A. from the University of Chicago.

== Career ==
York joined the Washington Examiner as chief political correspondent in 2009. He was previously a White House correspondent for National Review. He is also a syndicated columnist. Before working for National Review, York was a news producer at CNN Headline News and an investigative reporter for The American Spectator.

York has also written for The Atlantic, The Hill, The Wall Street Journal, The Weekly Standard, and the New York Post. He has appeared on such programs as Meet the Press, The NewsHour with Jim Lehrer, The O'Reilly Factor, Special Report, The Laura Ingraham Show, and Hardball with Chris Matthews.

=== Political positions ===
In 2001, York criticized President Bill Clinton's pardon of Susan McDougal, who had served three months in prison for contempt of court related to her involvement in the Whitewater scandal. In 2005, York posited a plot by the Democratic Party to "take down" President George W. Bush in his book The Vast Left Wing Conspiracy. In 2007, York called on President Bush to give a full pardon to Scooter Libby, who was sentenced to prison for obstruction of justice, perjury and making false statements in the Plame affair.

In 2010, York wrote an op-ed titled "Obama has himself to blame for Muslim problem", which argued that President Obama was to blame for the widespread misconception that he was Muslim. York wrote that Obama had written about his Muslim grandfather and noted that members of his extended family were Muslim. York said that the Obama campaign had "shouted down even a measured discussion of the topic", and "to the outside observer, Obama sometimes doesn’t appear to practice any faith at all. Put it all together, and is it any wonder the public is confused?"

According to the Toronto Star, York has "[led] the inquiries into the alleged deep-state conspiracy against Trump". According to Slate, York has "[spread] conspiracy theories about the FBI." York suggested that Special Counsel Robert Mueller's probe into Russian interference in the 2016 election could be compromised because of an alleged friendship to former FBI Director James Comey, whom President Trump fired. York supported Chuck Grassley and Lindsey Graham's recommendation of criminal charges against Christopher Steele, one of the people who sought to expose Russian interference in the 2016 election. They alleged that Steele had lied to federal authorities. However, federal authorities have not filed charges against him for lying. In July 2018, when Maria Butina, an accused Russian spy who had sought to involve herself in the National Rifle Association of America (NRA) and the Republican Party, was arrested, York downplayed the charges.

In February 2019, York argued that the attempt by the new Democratic majority in the House of Representatives to compel the release of President Trump's tax returns amounted to the "ultimate fishing expedition".

In 2020, during the George Floyd protests against racism and police brutality, York criticized a statement by former president George W. Bush which said it was "time for America to examine our tragic failures." York claimed it was "remarkable" that Bush "almost completely ignored riots, violence."

Shortly before the 2020 presidential election, York wrote a piece in the Washington Examiner analyzing a findings simulation that claimed Joe Biden wouldn't concede the election if he lost, and claiming that Biden would pressure Democratic governors to reject Trump's victory in their states and that House Democrats would refuse to acknowledge Trump's victory. He also asserted that Trump would concede if he lost. In the event, essentially that very scenario played out, but with the roles reversed. There is no record of York acknowledging the reversal.

On January 14, 2025 York published a column accusing Special Counsel Jack Smith of rushing the judicial process around his investigation of Donald Trump for crimes associated with the January 6th riot at the United States Capitol for the political purpose of interfering with the 2024 presidential election and concealing his intentions. The column failed to note an alternative explanation, that Smith’s actions were motivated by the sui generis nature of a criminal case in which, were Trump to be elected President before the case went to trial, the target of his investigation was the only individual indicted by a grand jury who would be empowered to unilaterally terminate prosecution, thus denying the criminal justice system of the opportunity to present evidence of criminality before a jury. Smith’s comments about his investigation, as recounted in York’s column, fit equally well with either interpretation.

== Family and personal life ==
He is the son of Tom York, a longtime television personality from Birmingham, Alabama, and Helen Hamilton (b. 1929). His nephew is the Washington Examiner's Life and Arts editor, Park MacDougald. He is married, and plays guitar and mandolin.

== Bibliography ==
- The Vast Left Wing Conspiracy: The Untold Story of How Democratic Operatives, Eccentric Billionaires, Liberal Activists, and Assorted Celebrities Tried to Bring Down a President—and Why They'll Try Even Harder Next Time (NY, Crown Forum, 2005) ISBN 1-4000-8238-2
