= Tom York (television personality) =

American television personality (1924–2021)

- Born: November 30, 1924; Holland, Missouri, U.S.
- Died: August 1, 2021 (aged 96)
- Education: Florence State Teachers College
- Children: Byron York
- Military career
- Branch: United States Navy
- Battles / wars: World War II

Tom York (November 30, 1924 – August 1, 2021) was an American television personality, who worked for WBRC in Birmingham, Alabama, from 1957 to 1989.

== Early life and education ==
York was born in Holland, Missouri. He served in the United States Navy as an aviation radioman and gunner during World War II. He graduated from Florence State Teachers College (now the University of North Alabama), then worked as a radio host in North Alabama before moving to Birmingham.

== Career ==
While he served in several capacities with the station, he is best remembered for The Tom York Morning Show, which was the station's primary morning show for 32 years. During the early 1960s, Fannie Flagg served as his co-host. The show was so popular that when WBRC's parent network, ABC, premiered its own morning show, Good Morning America, WBRC refused to carry it since it would have required moving York's show to another timeslot or canceling it altogether. WBRC began airing the second hour of GMA in the early 1980s and only began airing the entire show in 1989 after York retired.

After retiring from broadcast television, York was a weekly columnist for his hometown newspaper, The Hoover Gazette, from 2006 until shortly before the newspaper's demise in 2007.

York won a regional Emmy Award in 1995. He was the master of ceremonies for the induction ceremonies for the Alabama Sports Hall of Fame for more than a quarter century and was himself inducted into ASHOF in 1996. He wrote a book about the ASHOF in 2001.

He was the father of American author and conservative columnist Byron York.

== Death ==
York died on August 1, 2021, aged 96. In his last years he had been living in a retirement community outside of Birmingham. His wife of 73 years, Helen Hamilton York, died on October 13, 2021.
