= Yama, Missouri =

Unincorporated community in Missouri, U.S.

Coordinates: 36°15′36″N 89°56′35″W

Yama is an unincorporated community in Pemiscot County, in the U.S. state of Missouri.

Variant names were "Yamma" and "Yuma". It is unknown why the name "Yama" was applied to this community. The community once had a schoolhouse.
