= Deering, Missouri =

Unincorporated community in Missouri

- Census-Designated Place
- Interactive map of Deering, Missouri
- Coordinates: 36°11′28″N 89°53′04″W
- Country: United States
- State: Missouri
- County: Pemiscot

Area
  - Total: 0.30 sq mi (0.77 km^{2})
  - Land: 0.30 sq mi (0.77 km^{2})
  - Water: 0.0039 sq mi (0.01 km^{2})
- Elevation: 256 ft (78 m)

Population (2020)
  - Total: 61
  - Density: 206.5/sq mi (79.73/km^{2})
- FIPS code: 29-18838
- GNIS feature ID: 2804678

Deering is an unincorporated community in Pemiscot County, Missouri, United States. As of the 2020 census, Deering had a population of 61. It is located fifteen miles west of Caruthersville.

Deering began as a lumber town in the early 1900s. The post office has been in operation since 1903. The community was named for William Deering, founder of the Deering Harvester Company, which in 1902 merged into the newly formed International Harvester Company. The company owned the land on which the community was established, and the land was later acquired by the Wisconsin Lumber Company.

== Demographics ==
Historical population
Census	Pop.	Note	%±
2020	61		—
U.S. Decennial Census

Deering first appeared as a census designated place in the 2020 U.S. census.

== Education ==
It is in the Delta C-7 School District. The Delta district houses grades K–12.

Three Rivers College's service area includes Pemiscot County.
