= Tyler, Missouri =

Unincorporated community in Missouri, U.S.

Coordinates: 36°02′02″N 89°44′14″W

Tyler is an unincorporated community in Pemiscot County, located in the U.S. state of Missouri. The community is situated on County Road 570, approximately four miles east-southeast of Cooter. The Mississippi River is 1.5 miles to the east, while Cottonwood Point, situated on the bank of the Mississippi, is three miles to the northeast.

== History ==
A post office called Tyler was established in 1891 and remained in operation until 1954. The community was named after H. A. Tyler, a businessperson in the lumber industry.
