= Denton, Pemiscot County, Missouri =

- Census-Designated Place
- Interactive map of Denton, Pemiscot County, Missouri
- Coordinates: 36°05′26″N 89°53′29″W
- Country: United States
- State: Missouri
- County: Pemiscot

Area
  - Total: 0.38 sq mi (0.98 km^{2})
  - Land: 0.38 sq mi (0.98 km^{2})
  - Water: 0 sq mi (0.00 km^{2})
- Elevation: 259 ft (79 m)

Population (2020)
  - Total: 82
  - Density: 217.1/sq mi (83.81/km^{2})
- FIPS code: 29-19144
- GNIS feature ID: 2804679

Denton is an unincorporated community and census-designated place (CDP) in Pemiscot County, in the U.S. state of Missouri.

The community has the name of Neil V. Denton, the original owner of the site.

== Demographics ==
Historical population
Census	Pop.	Note	%±
2020	82		—
U.S. Decennial Census

Denton first appeared as a census designated place in the 2020 U.S. census.

== Education ==
South Pemiscot Schools is the local school district.

Three Rivers College's service area includes Pemiscot County.
