= Homestown, Missouri =

- City
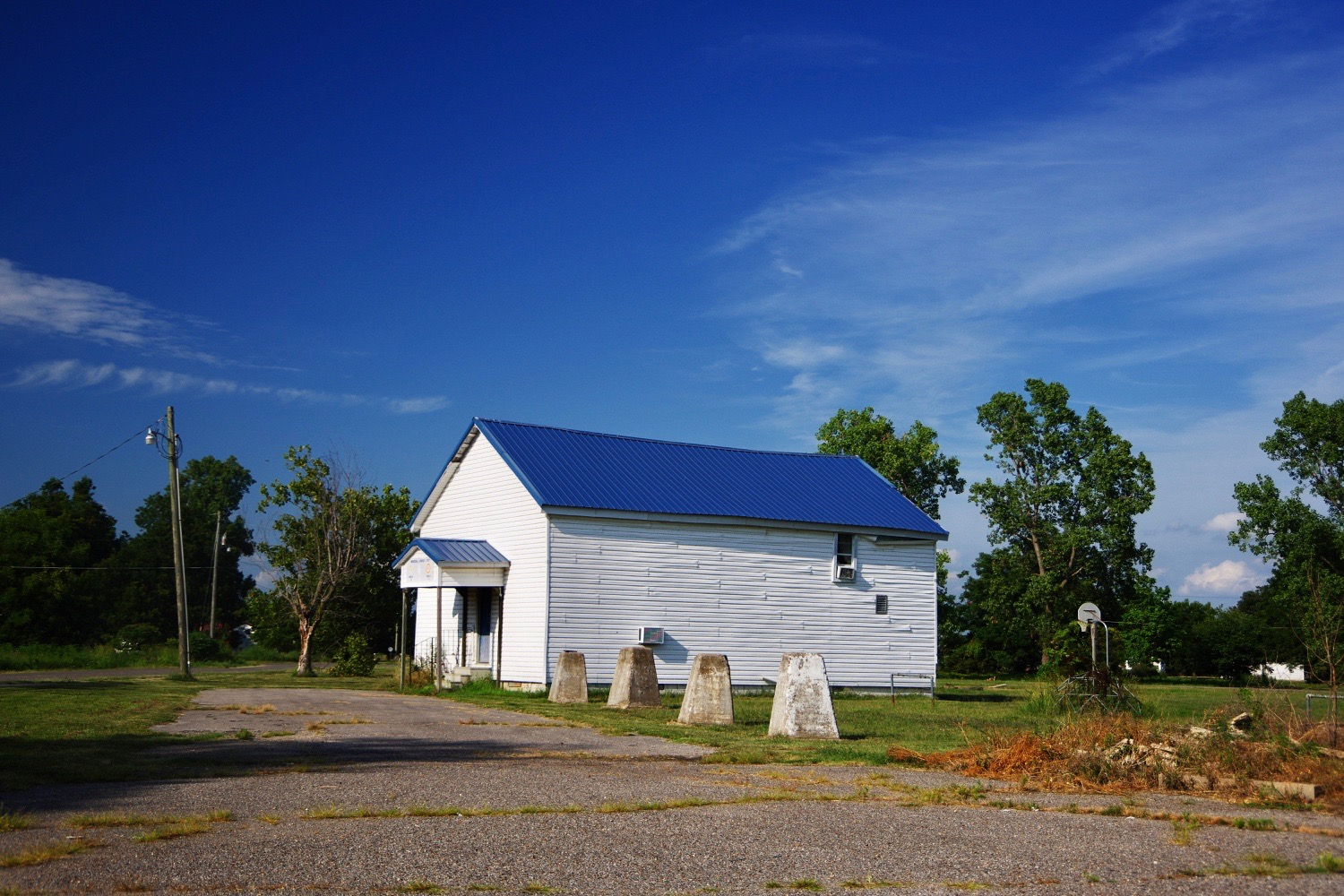
- Wardell Lodge #157 in Homestown

- Location of Homestown, Missouri
- Coordinates: 36°19′55″N 89°49′27″W
- Country: United States
- State: Missouri
- County: Pemiscot

Area
  - Total: 0.12 sq mi (0.32 km^{2})
  - Land: 0.12 sq mi (0.32 km^{2})
  - Water: 0 sq mi (0.00 km^{2})
- Elevation: 269 ft (82 m)

Population (2020)
  - Total: 73
  - Density: 591.3/sq mi (228.31/km^{2})
- Time zone: UTC-6 (Central (CST))
  - Summer (DST): UTC-5 (CDT)
- ZIP code: 63879
- Area code: 573
- FIPS code: 29-32824
- GNIS feature ID: 2394412

Homestown is a city in Pemiscot County, Missouri, United States. The population was 73 at the 2020 census.

== History ==
Homestown, originally known as South Wardell, was one of ten communities constructed by the Farm Security Administration for displaced sharecroppers and tenant farmers following the January 1939 roadside sharecropper demonstration in Southeast Missouri. It was the largest of the communities and was designated for use by African-Americans.

The Delmo Community Center was listed on the National Register of Historic Places in 2009.

== Geography ==
According to the United States Census Bureau, the city has a total area of 0.12 square miles (0.31 km^{2}), all land.

== Demographics ==
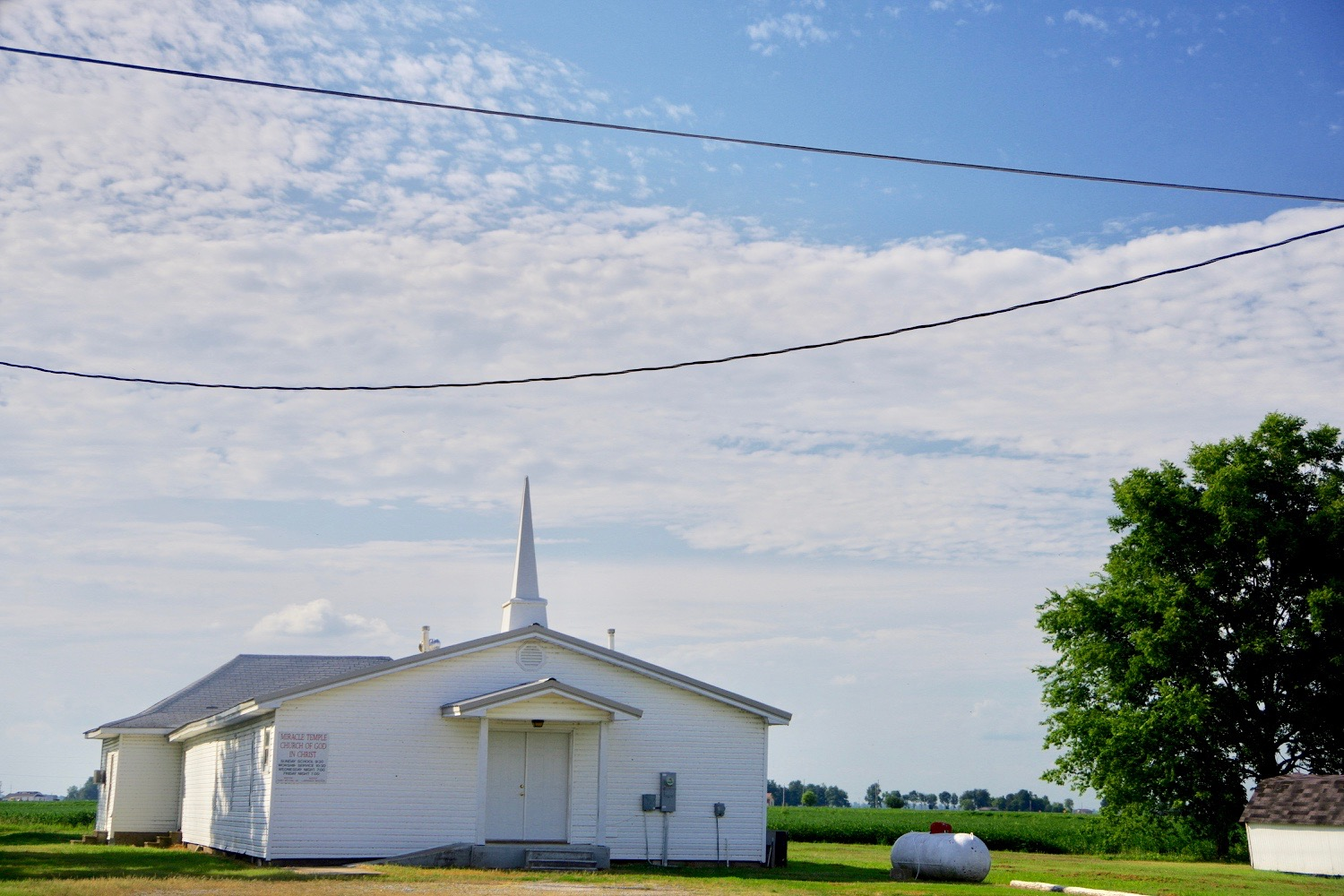
Miracle Temple Church of God in Christ in Homestown

Historical population
Census	Pop.	Note	%±
1960	274		—
1970	273		−0.4%
1980	306		12.1%
1990	230		−24.8%
2000	181		−21.3%
2010	151		−16.6%
2020	73		−51.7%
U.S. Decennial Census

=== 2020 census ===
Homestown city, Missouri – Racial and ethnic composition Note: the US Census treats Hispanic/Latino as an ethnic category. This table excludes Latinos from the racial categories and assigns them to a separate category. Hispanics/Latinos may be of any race.
Race / Ethnicity (NH = Non-Hispanic)	Pop 2000	Pop 2010	Pop 2020	% 2000	% 2010	% 2020
White alone (NH)	20	4	0	11.05%	2.65%	0.00%
Black or African American alone (NH)	161	144	59	88.95%	95.36%	80.82%
Native American or Alaska Native alone (NH)	0	1	0	0.00%	0.66%	0.00%
Asian alone (NH)	0	0	0	0.00%	0.00%	0.00%
Native Hawaiian or Pacific Islander alone (NH)	0	0	0	0.00%	0.00%	0.00%
Other race alone (NH)	0	0	0	0.00%	0.00%	0.00%
Mixed race or Multiracial (NH)	0	2	12	0.00%	1.32%	16.44%
Hispanic or Latino (any race)	0	0	2	0.00%	0.00%	2.74%
Total	181	151	73	100.00%	100.00%	100.00%

=== 2010 census ===
As of the census of 2010, there were 151 people, 53 households, and 38 families living in the city. The population density was 1,258.3 inhabitants per square mile (485.8/km^{2}). There were 66 housing units at an average density of 550.0 per square mile (212.4/km^{2}). The racial makeup of the city was 2.65% White, 95.36% Black or African American, 0.66% Native American, and 1.32% from two or more races.

There were 53 households, of which 32.1% had children under the age of 18 living with them, 28.3% were married couples living together, 28.3% had a female householder with no husband present, 15.1% had a male householder with no wife present, and 28.3% were non-families. 22.6% of all households were made up of individuals, and 7.5% had someone living alone who was 65 years of age or older. The average household size was 2.85 and the average family size was 3.32.

The median age in the city was 32.6 years. 29.8% of residents were under the age of 18; 10.6% were between the ages of 18 and 24; 24.5% were from 25 to 44; 27.1% were from 45 to 64; and 7.9% were 65 years of age or older. The gender makeup of the city was 53.0% male and 47.0% female.

=== 2000 census ===
As of the census of 2000, there were 181 people, 61 households, and 48 families living in the city. The population density was 1,452.6 inhabitants per square mile (560.9/km^{2}). There were 77 housing units at an average density of 618.0 per square mile (238.6/km^{2}). The racial makeup of the city was 11.05% White and 88.95% African American.

There were 61 households, out of which 36.1% had children under the age of 18 living with them, 39.3% were married couples living together, 36.1% had a female householder with no husband present, and 21.3% were non-families. 19.7% of all households were made up of individuals, and 13.1% had someone living alone who was 65 years of age or older. The average household size was 2.97 and the average family size was 3.31.

In the city, the population was spread out, with 35.9% under the age of 18, 13.8% from 18 to 24, 13.3% from 25 to 44, 25.4% from 45 to 64, and 11.6% who were 65 years of age or older. The median age was 25 years. For every 100 females there were 96.7 males. For every 100 females age 18 and over, there were 81.3 males.

The median income for a household in the city was $12,143, and the median income for a family was $11,607. Males had a median income of $19,250 versus $17,500 for females. The per capita income for the city was $6,780. About 53.1% of families and 52.8% of the population were below the poverty line, including 61.9% of those under the age of eighteen and 53.8% of those 65 or over.

== Education ==
It is in the North Pemiscot County R-I School District.

Three Rivers College's service area includes Pemiscot County.
