= Vicksburg, Missouri =

Unincorporated community in Missouri, U.S.

Coordinates: 36°09′14″N 89°52′12″W

Vicksburg is an unincorporated community in Pemiscot County, in the U.S. state of Missouri.

== History ==
A post office called Vicksburg was established in 1913, and remained in operation until 1917. The community was named after J. P. Vickery, a local schoolteacher.
