= South Pemiscot Schools =

School district in Missouri, U.S.

South Pemiscot County R-V School District, also known as South Pemiscot Schools, is a school district headquartered in Steele, Missouri.

It includes Steele, Denton, and Holland.

Schools:

- South Pemiscot High School
- Central Elementary School
- East Elementary School
