= Mid City, Missouri =

Unincorporated community in Missouri, U.S.

Coordinates: 36°14′01″N 89°53′48″W

Mid City is an unincorporated community in Pemiscot County, in the U.S. state of Missouri.

Mid City was so named on account of its midway location between Caruthersville and Kennett.
