= Number Nine, Arkansas =

- Unincorporated community
- Location within Arkansas Location within the United States
- Coordinates: 35°59′16″N 89°48′27″W
- Country: United States
- State: Arkansas
- County: Mississippi
- Elevation: 259 ft (79 m)
- Time zone: UTC-6 (Central (CST))
  - Summer (DST): UTC-5 (CDT)
- Area code: 870
- GNIS feature ID: 58281

Number Nine is an unincorporated community in Mississippi County, Arkansas, United States. Number Nine is located on Arkansas Highway 150, 7.5 miles (12.1 km) east-northeast of Blytheville.
