= Hermondale, Missouri =

Unincorporated community in Missouri, U.S.

Coordinates: 36°00′58″N 89°54′53″W

Hermondale is an unincorporated community in Pemiscot County, in the U.S. state of Missouri.

== History ==
A post office called Hermondale was established in 1919, and remained in operation until 1955. The community was named after Hermon G. Reynolds, the original owner of the town site.
