= Murphy Mound Archeological Site =

Prehistoric archaeological site in USA

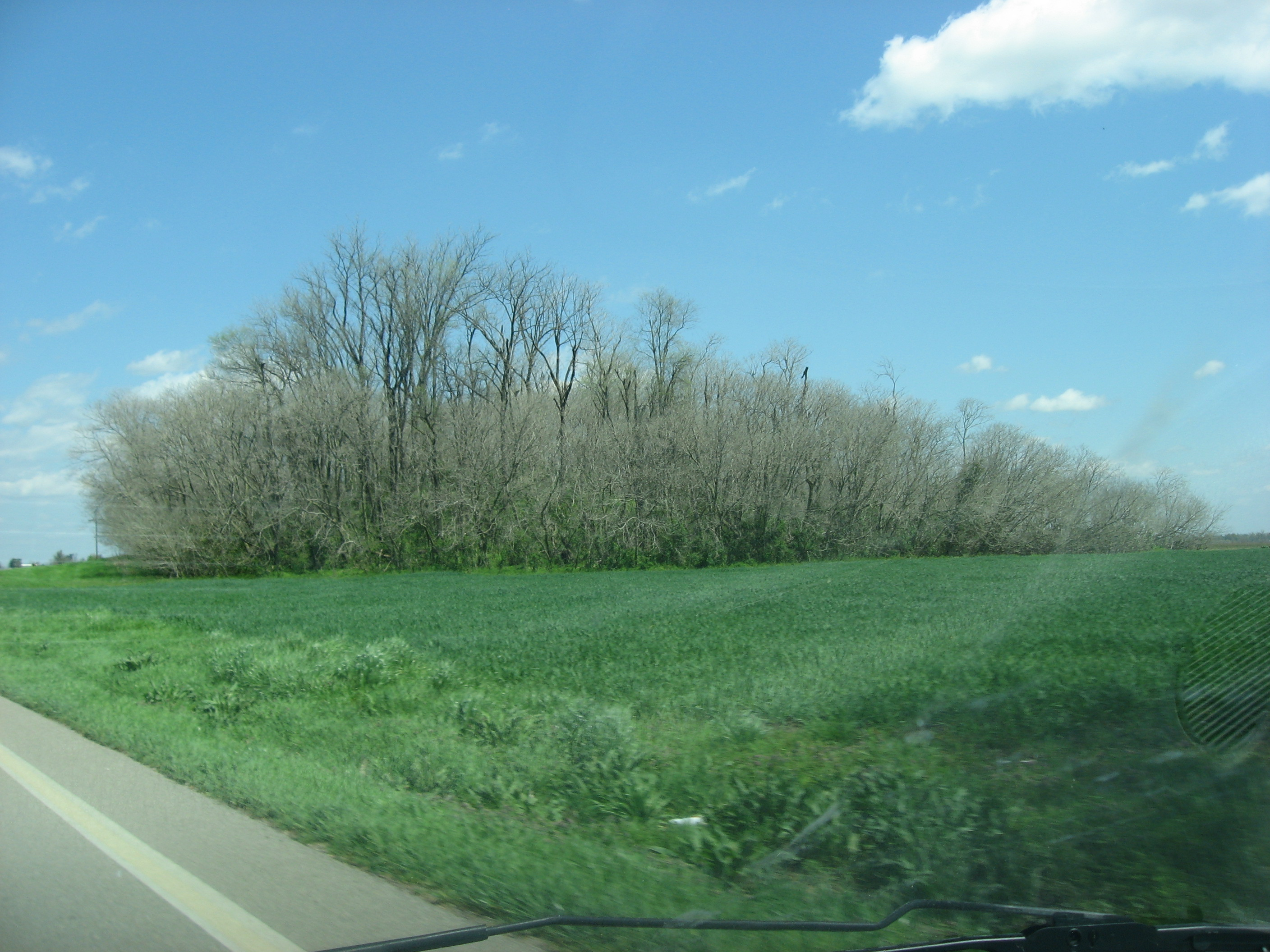
- View from the south

- Location within Missouri
- 36°9′10″N 89°41′40″W
- Periods: Late Mississippian period
- Cultures: Middle Mississippian culture
- Location: Caruthersville, Missouri, Pemiscot County, Missouri, USA
- Region: Pemiscot County, Missouri

History
- Built: 1350 CE
- Abandoned: 1541 CE

Site notes
- Architectural style: platform mound
- Murphy Mound Archeological Site
- U.S. National Register of Historic Places
- NRHP reference No.: 69000119
- Added to NRHP: May 21, 1969

The Murphy Mound Archeological Site (23 PM 43), is a prehistoric archaeological site in the Bootheel region of the U.S. state of Missouri. Located southwest of Caruthersville in Pemiscot County, Missouri the site was occupied by peoples of the Late Mississippian period, centuries before European colonization of the area.

Conclusive dates for the site's occupation have not been determined; one survey concluded that occupation began around 1200 CE and continued until at least 1400. A study of the site's pottery held that the location was inhabited from approximately 1350 until 1541. The platform mound, now overgrown with trees, may be the largest of any Mississippian culture site in Missouri. It is located on private land and is not open to the public. A selection of the pots is displayed at the University of Missouri Museum of Anthropology.

Excavation at the site's cemetery has revealed ninety-one skeletons. These were buried in numerous fashions, including bundle burials, bodies fully extended, and cremations. In 1969, Murphy was listed on the National Register of Historic Places; it was the first site in Pemiscot County to be listed on the NRHP.

== See also ==
- List of Mississippian sites
- Mississippi Valley: Culture, phase, and chronological periods table - List of archaeological periods
