= USS Vicksburg =

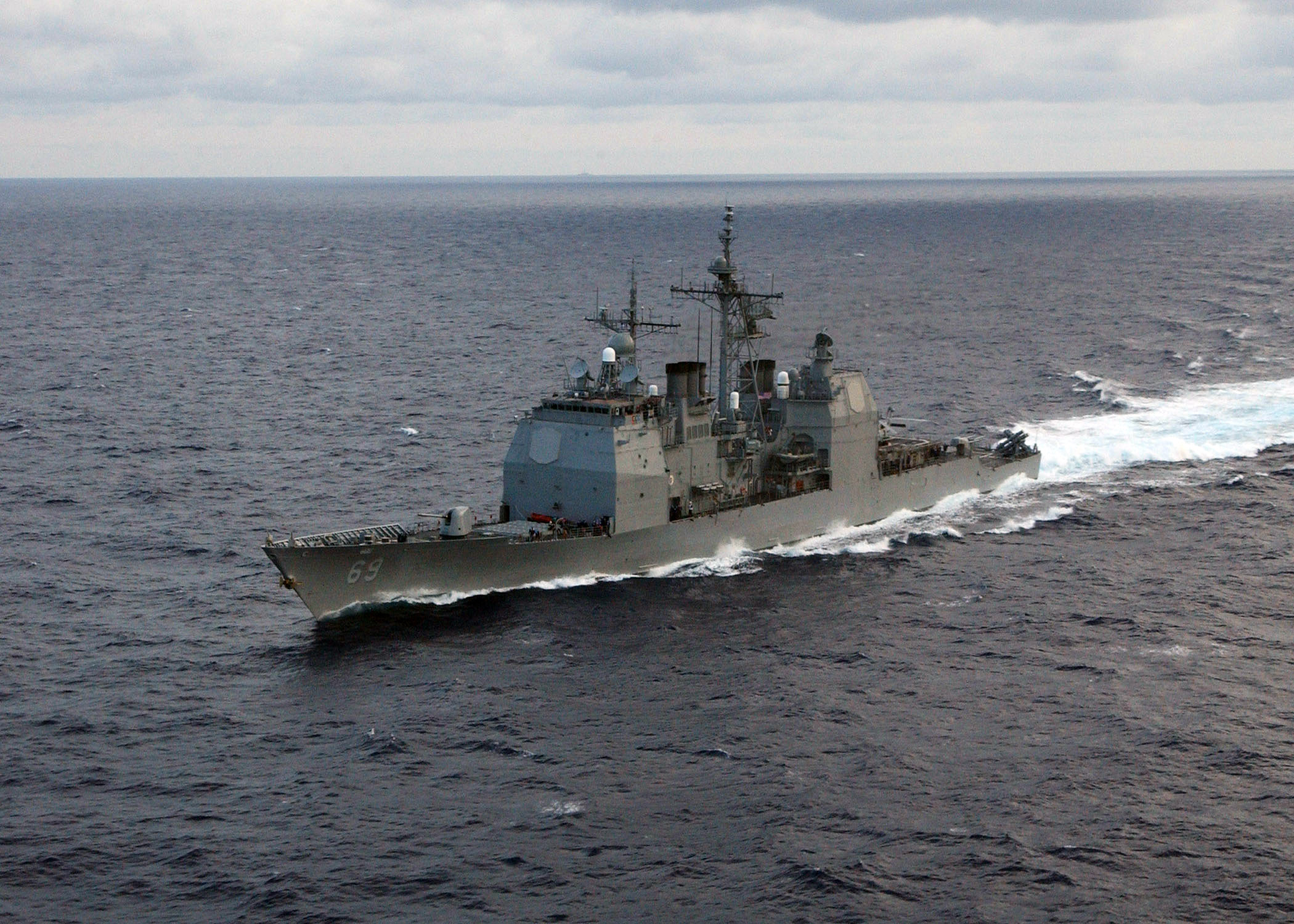
The guided missile cruiser USS Vicksburg (CG-69) cruises the Atlantic Ocean preparing for an early underway replenishment with the fast combat support ship USS Seattle on 11 June 2004

USS Vicksburg may refer to the following ships of the United States Navy:

- USS Vicksburg (1863) was a steamship, purchased and commissioned by the Navy in 1863, and sold in 1865
- USS Vicksburg (PG-11) was a gunboat, commissioned in 1897; transferred to the United States Coast Guard in 1922, and out of service in 1944
- USS Vicksburg (CL-81), was a Cleveland-class light cruiser, renamed Houston during construction; and served 1942–1947
- USS Vicksburg (CL-86), originally named Cheyenne, was a Cleveland-class light cruiser, commissioned in 1944 and struck in 1962
- USS Vicksburg (CG-69), originally named Port Royal is a Ticonderoga-class guided missile cruiser, commissioned in 1992 and decommissioned in 2024

== See also ==
- CSS Vicksburg, aka City of Vicksburg, a Confederate Navy gunboat
