= U.S. Highway 61 Arch =

Monument on the Arkansas-Missouri border in the United States

- United States Highway 61 Arch
- U.S. National Register of Historic Places
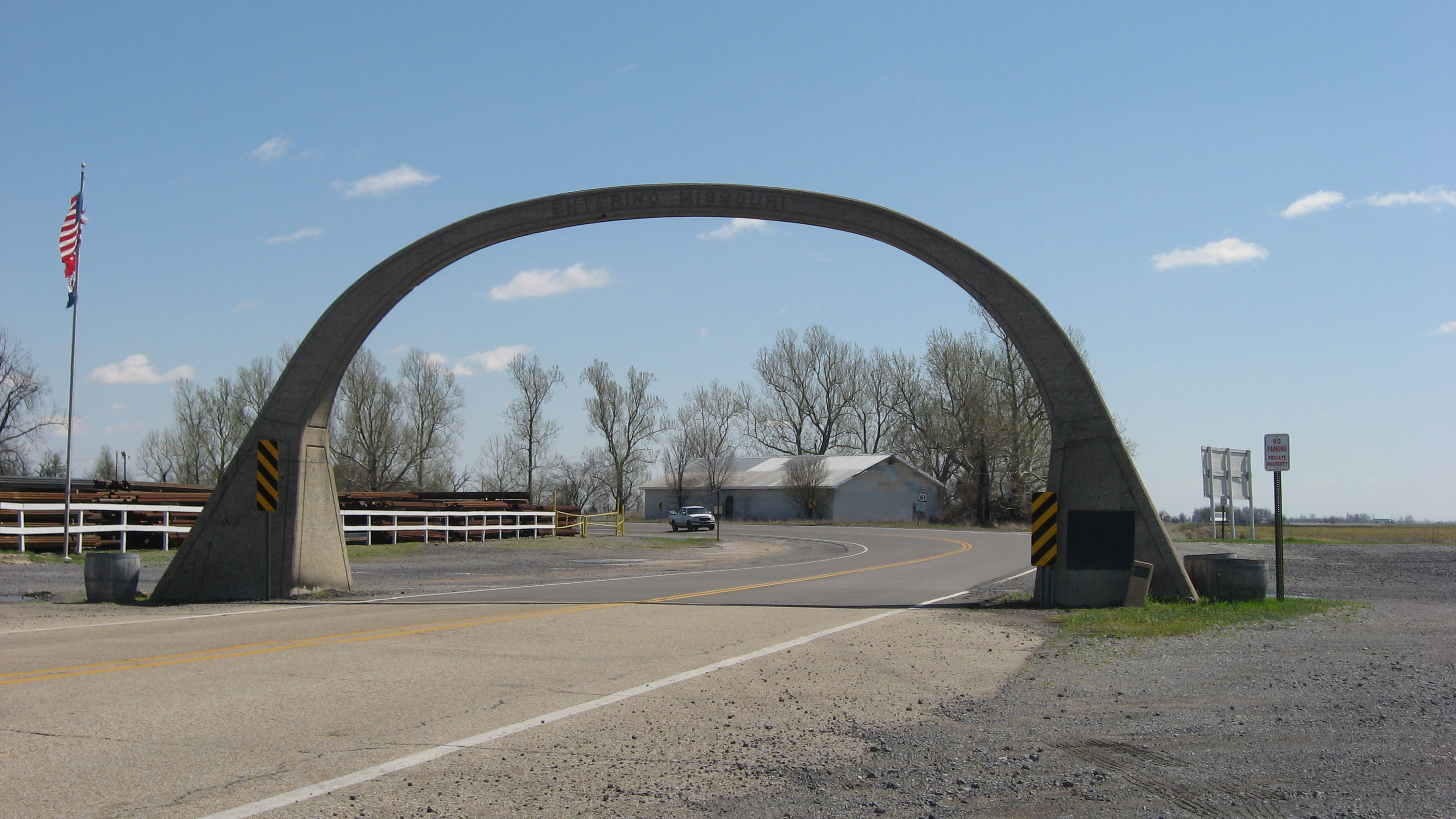

- Location within Missouri Location within Arkansas Location within the United States
- Nearest city: Blytheville, Arkansas
- Coordinates: 35°59′58″N 89°53′54″W
- Area: less than one acre
- Built: 1924
- Built by: H.H. Hall Construction Company
- Architectural style: Horseshoe Arch
- MPS: Arkansas Highway History and Architecture MPS
- NRHP reference No.: 01001177
- Added to NRHP: October 28, 2001

The United States Highway 61 Arch, commonly known as the U.S. Highway 61 Arch or the U.S. Route 61 Arch, is an arch which crosses U.S. Route 61 (US 61) at the Arkansas–Missouri state line, between Blytheville, Arkansas, and Steele, Missouri. The concrete horseshoe arch reads "Entering Arkansas" on one side and "Entering Missouri" on the other. The Mississippi County, Arkansas Road Improvement District built the arch in 1924 after paving the highway; it erected a similar arch over the highway at the Crittenden County line, but the other arch was removed in the 1950s. At the time, the highway was called the North–South Road, and it was already a major route between St. Louis, Missouri, and Memphis, Tennessee; the next year, it was designated as part of US 61. The arch is the only archway over a U.S. Highway in Arkansas.

The arch was added to the National Register of Historic Places on October 28, 2001.

== See also ==
- Dual State Monument: monument on the Arkansas-Louisiana border
- OKKAMO Tri-State Marker: monument on the Arkansas-Missouri-Oklahoma tripoint
- National Register of Historic Places listings in Mississippi County, Arkansas
- National Register of Historic Places listings in Pemiscot County, Missouri
