= Concord, Pemiscot County, Missouri =

Unincorporated community in the US state of Missouri

Coordinates: 36°17′36″N 89°42′03″W

Concord is an unincorporated community in Pemiscot County, in the U.S. state of Missouri.

== History ==
The community once contained a church and a school, which both are now defunct. The area derives its name from the Concord Baptist Church, founded in 1898.
