= Beaver Falls, Minnesota =

Unincorporated community in Minnesota, US

Beaver Falls
- Unincorporated community
- Location within Minnesota Location within the United States
- Coordinates: 44°34′59″N 95°02′50″W
- Country: United States
- State: Minnesota
- County: Renville
- Elevation: 922 ft (281 m)
- Time zone: UTC-6 (Central (CST))
  - Summer (DST): UTC-5 (CDT)
- Area code: 320
- GNIS feature ID: 639830

Beaver Falls is an unincorporated community in Renville County, in the U.S. state of Minnesota.

== History ==
Beaver Falls was platted in 1866, and named for nearby Beaver Creek. A post office was established at Beaver Falls in 1867, and remained in operation until 1904. Beaver Falls was the original county seat of Renville County.

Beaver Falls was listed as incorporated in the 1900 United States census.

Historical population
Census	Pop.	Note	%±
1880	185		—
1900	189		—
U.S. Decennial Census
