= Armorel, Arkansas =

- Census-designated place
- Location within Arkansas Location within the United States
- Coordinates: 35°55′20″N 89°48′03″W
- Country: United States
- State: Arkansas
- County: Mississippi
- Established: 1899

Area
  - Total: 1.48 sq mi (3.8 km^{2})
  - Land: 1.39 sq mi (3.6 km^{2})
  - Water: 0.09 sq mi (0.23 km^{2})
- Elevation: 259 ft (79 m)

Population (2020)
  - Total: 312
  - Density: 223.8/sq mi (86.4/km^{2})
- Time zone: UTC-6 (Central (CST))
  - Summer (DST): UTC-5 (CDT)
- ZIP code: 72310
- Area code: 870
- FIPS code: 05-02230
- GNIS feature ID: 2805619

Armorel is an unincorporated community and census-designated place (CDP) in Mississippi County, Arkansas, United States. As of the 2020 census, it had a population of 312. It is in a largely rural area with most of its land devoted to forests and farms. Most of the town lies between Arkansas highways 18 and 312. The town's name was formed from the abbreviations of Arkansas and Missouri, along with the first three initials of its founder, Wilson.

== History ==
The town was founded in 1899 by lumber magnate and president of Lee Wilson and Company, R.E.L. Wilson as one of his many company holdings. By 1900, he was operating one of his companies, the Beall Lumber Company, in the community. The lumber mill and nearly three million feet of cut lumber later burned to the ground on June 10, 1902.

By 1904, the community received a rail connection when the Chickasawba Railroad completed its line from Blytheville to Barfield Landing on the Mississippi River. This line was soon after consolidated into the Jonesboro, Lake City, and Eastern Railroad.

In 1924, the community of Armorel hosted a division of Marcus Garvey's Universal Negro Improvement Association.

== Education ==
Public education for early childhood, elementary and secondary education is available from the Armorel School District, that leads to graduation from Armorel High School.

== Demographics ==
Historical population
Census	Pop.	Note	%±
2020	312		—
U.S. Decennial Census; 2020

=== 2020 census ===
Armorel CDP, Arkansas Racial and ethnic composition Note: the US Census treats Hispanic/Latino as an ethnic category. This table excludes Latinos from the racial categories and assigns them to a separate category. Hispanics/Latinos may be of any race.
Race / Ethnicity (NH = Non-Hispanic)	Pop 2020	% 2020
White alone (NH)	272	87.18%
Black or African American alone (NH)	23	7.37%
Native American or Alaska Native alone (NH)	0	0.00%
Asian alone (NH)	4	1.28%
Pacific Islander alone (NH)	0	0.00%
Some Other Race alone (NH)	0	0.00%
Mixed Race or Multi-Racial (NH)	4	1.28%
Hispanic or Latino (any race)	9	2.88%
Total	312	100.00%

== Notable people ==
- Joey L. Carr, American politician and resident of Armorel
