= Vicksburg, Minnesota =

Ghost town in Renville County, Minnesota, US

Vicksburg is an abandoned townsite in section 30 of Flora Township in Renville County, Minnesota, United States. The nearest community is the small city of Delhi, south across the Minnesota River in Redwood County.

== History ==
Vicksburg was platted in 1867, and named in remembrance of the surrender of Vicksburg, Mississippi, during the American Civil War. Vicksburg had a post office from 1871 until 1901. During its peak, Vicksburg included a general store, creamery, sawmill, church, school, blacksmith shop, sorghum press, doctor's office and saloon. The town was abandoned by 1905 when the site was bypassed by the railroads. All that remains today is a cemetery, located north of the townsite, at 44°39′50″N 95°13′37″W.

== Recreation ==
Renville County operates a park named Vicksburg County Park (formerly County Park 2) near the old townsite, down the hill from the Vicksburg Cemetery. The park offers primitive campsites, restrooms, picnic areas, hiking trails, interpretive features and boating access to the Minnesota River.
