= Pemiscot County, Missouri =

County in Missouri, United States

- County
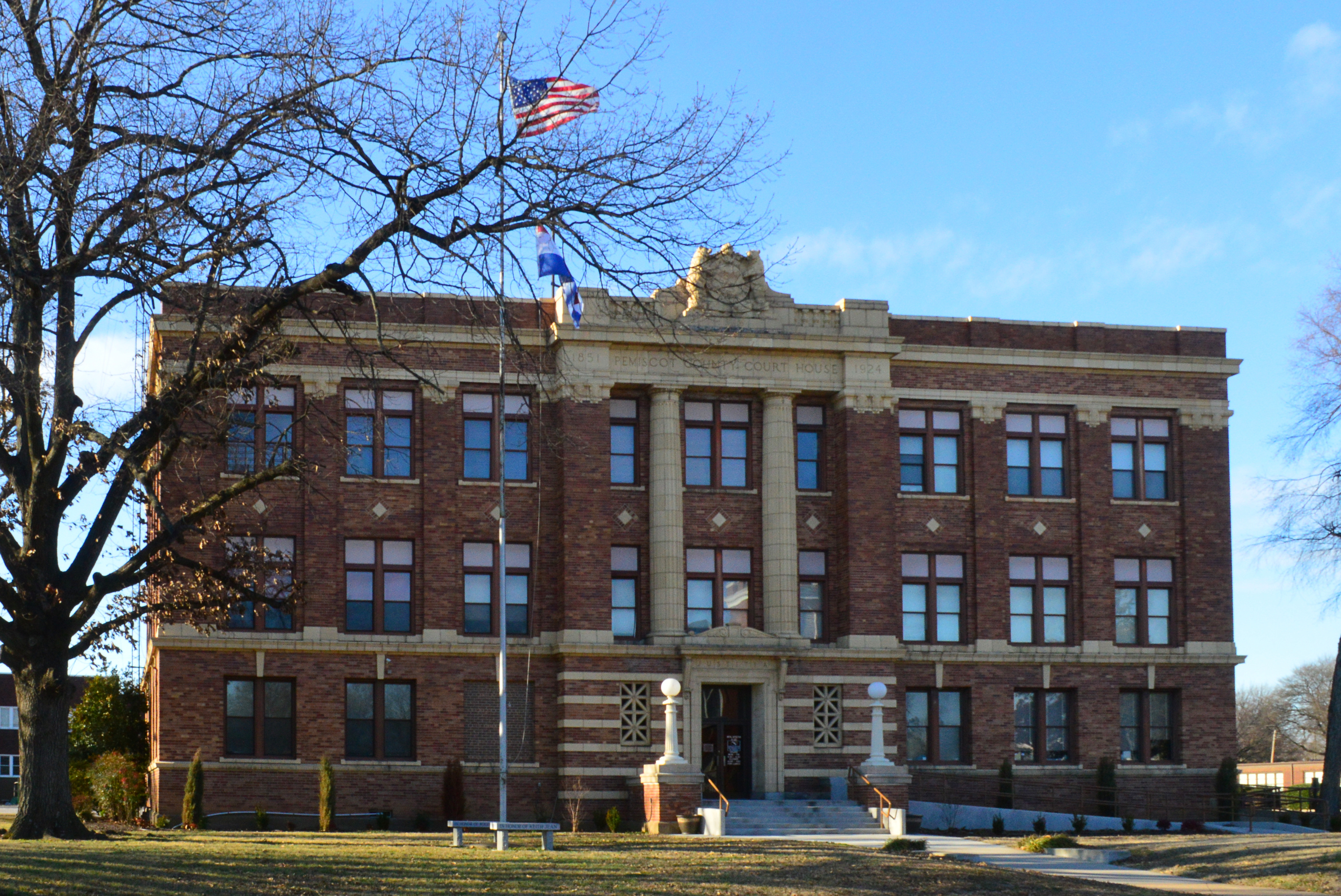
- Pemiscot County Courthouse in Caruthersville

- Location within the U.S. state of Missouri
- Coordinates: 36°13′N 89°47′W
- Country: United States
- State: Missouri
- Founded: February 19, 1851
- Named for: Fox word meaning "liquid mud"
- Seat: Caruthersville
- Largest city: Caruthersville

Area
  - Total: 513 sq mi (1,330 km^{2})
  - Land: 493 sq mi (1,280 km^{2})
  - Water: 21 sq mi (54 km^{2}) 4.1%

Population (2020)
  - Total: 15,661
  - Estimate (2025): 14,465 ▼
  - Density: 31.8/sq mi (12.3/km^{2})
- Time zone: UTC−6 (Central)
  - Summer (DST): UTC−5 (CDT)
- Congressional district: 8th
- Website: www.pemiscotcounty.org

Pemiscot County is a county located in the southeastern corner of the Bootheel of the U.S. state of Missouri, with the Mississippi River forming its eastern border. As of the 2020 census, the population was 15,661. The largest city and county seat is Caruthersville. The county was officially organized on February 19, 1851. It is named for the local bayou, taken from the word pem-eskaw, meaning "liquid mud", in the language of the native Meskwaki people. This has been an area of cotton plantations and later other commodity crops.

Murphy Mound Archeological Site has one of the largest platform mounds in Missouri. It is a major earthwork of the Late Mississippian culture, which had settlement sites throughout the Mississippi Valley and tributaries. The site is privately owned and is not open to the public. The site may have been occupied from as early as 1200 CE and continuing to about 1541.

== History ==
Bordering the river and its floodplain, the county was devoted to agricultural development and commodity crops. In the 19th and early 20th centuries, the major commodity crop was cotton, which was worked at the beginning mainly by enslaved African Americans.

After the Reconstruction era, four African Americans were lynched in the area, all during the early 1900s and in the county seat. This was a period of disfranchisement for Americans, and included heightened violence against them by racist mobs.

To escape such this mistreatment, many African Americans left the county in the Great Migration, moving to big cities to seek employment. Also, with the mechanization of agriculture requiring fewer laborers, the county's population has continually declined since its peak in 1940. In 1940, with 46,857 people Pemiscot County was one of the most-populous county areas in the state, behind only St. Louis city 816,048, Jackson County 477,828, St. Louis County 274,230, Buchanan County 94,067 Greene County 90,541, and Jasper County 78,705.

== Geography ==
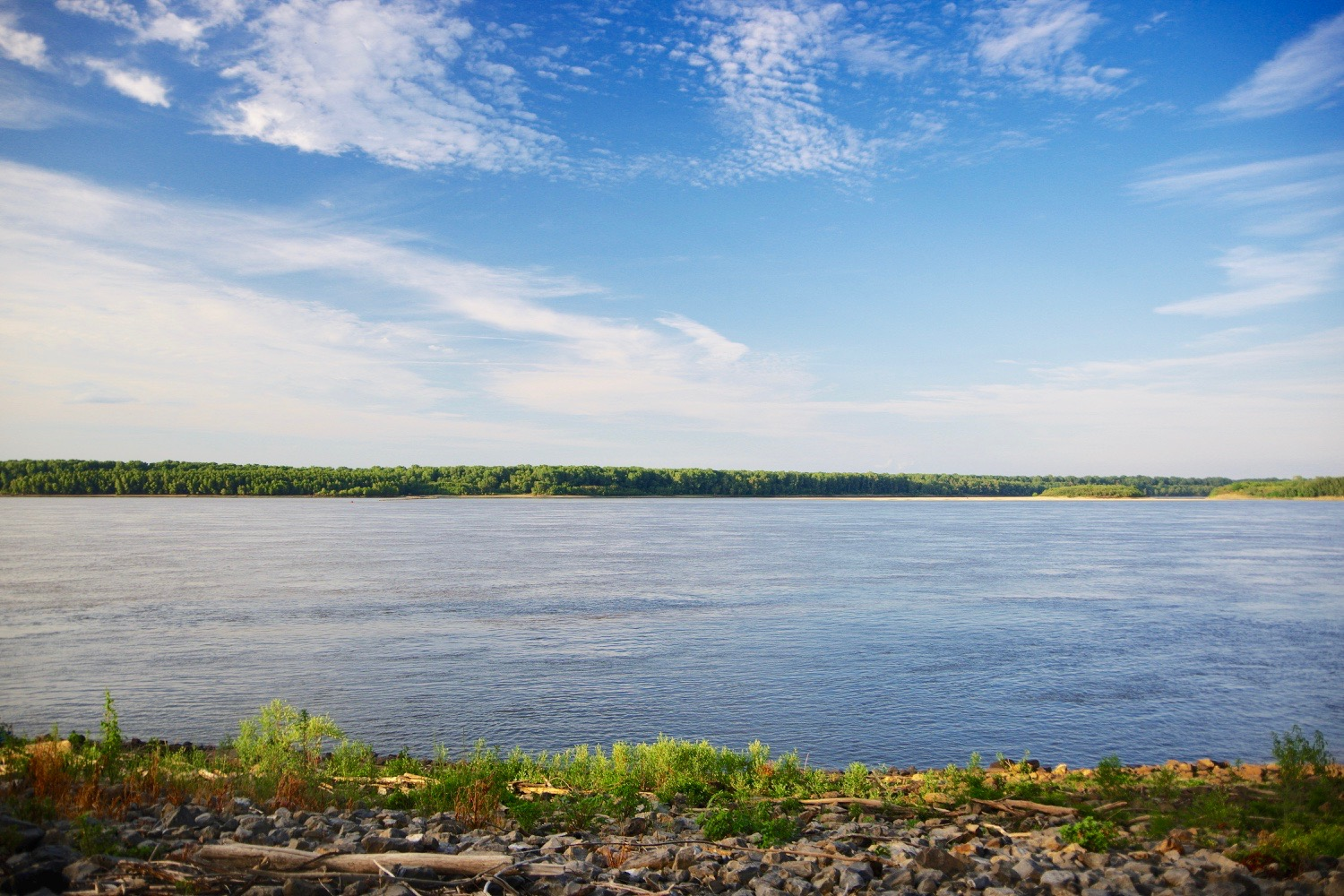
The Mississippi River, viewed from Caruthersville

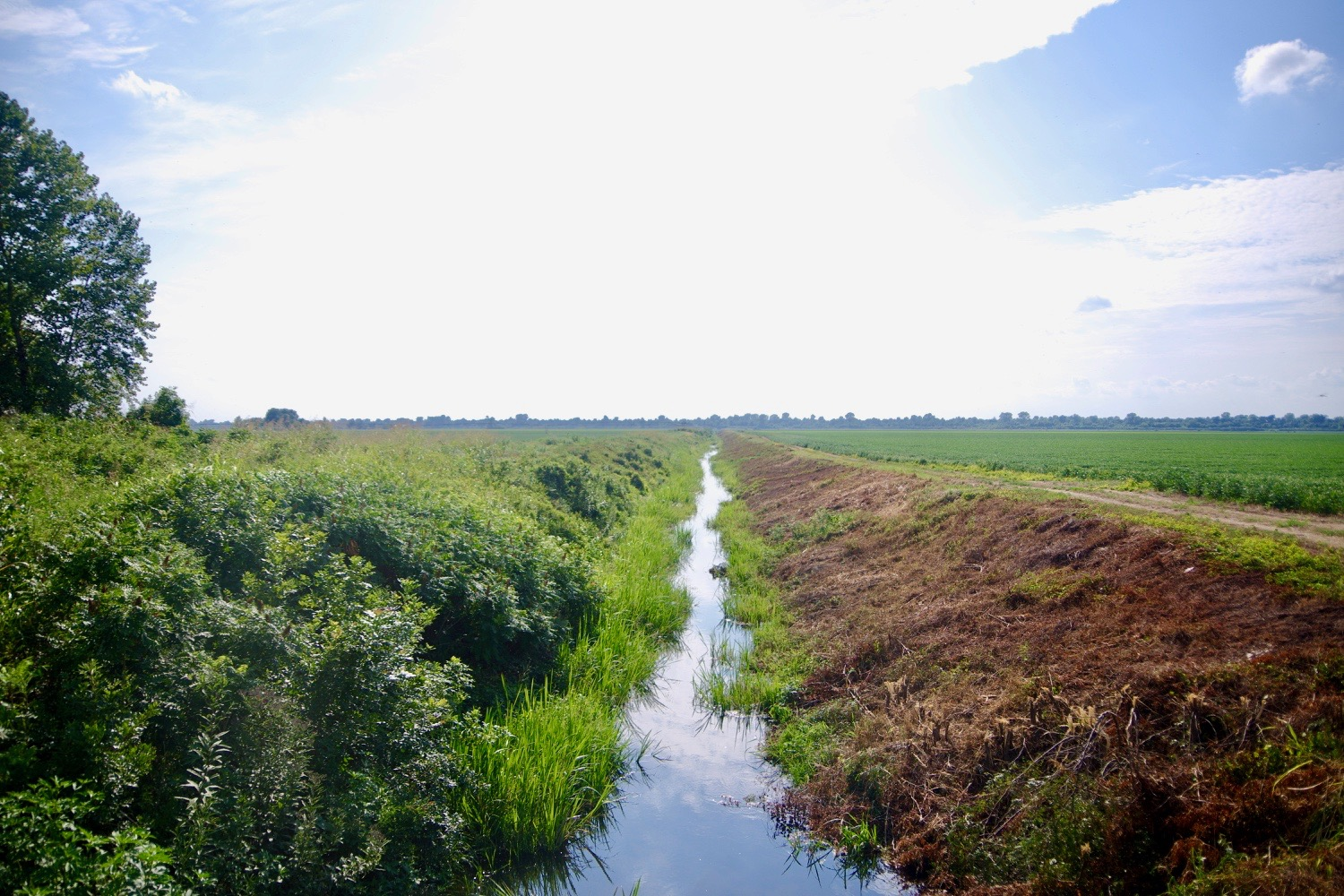
Ditch No. 70, a drainage ditch near Bragg City

According to the U.S. Census Bureau, the county has a total area of 513 square miles (1,330 km^{2}), of which 493 square miles (1,280 km^{2}) is land and 21 square miles (54 km^{2}) (4.1%) is water. Fishing is a popular activity among residents in the area.

Pemiscot County is the only Missouri county entirely within the Sun Belt, defined by the Kinder Institute as being south of 36°30'N latitude.

=== Adjacent counties ===
- New Madrid County (north)
- Lake County, Tennessee (northeast across the Mississippi River)
- Dyer County, Tennessee (southeast across the Mississippi River)
- Mississippi County, Arkansas (south)
- Dunklin County (west)

=== Major highways ===
- I-55
- I-155
- US 61
- US 412
- Route 84
- Route 153
- Route 164

== Demographics ==
Historical population
Census	Pop.	Note	%±
1860	2,962		—
1870	2,059		−30.5%
1880	4,299		108.8%
1890	5,975		39.0%
1900	12,115		102.8%
1910	19,559		61.4%
1920	26,634		36.2%
1930	37,284		40.0%
1940	46,857		25.7%
1950	45,624		−2.6%
1960	38,095		−16.5%
1970	26,373		−30.8%
1980	24,987		−5.3%
1990	21,921		−12.3%
2000	20,047		−8.5%
2010	18,296		−8.7%
2020	15,661		−14.4%
2025 (est.)	14,465	▼	−7.6%
U.S. Decennial Census; 1790-1960 1900-1990; 1990-2000 2010-2015

=== 2020 census ===
As of the 2020 census, the county had a population of 15,661. The median age was 39.0 years, 25.8% of residents were under the age of 18, and 17.8% of residents were 65 years of age or older. For every 100 females there were 92.0 males, and for every 100 females age 18 and over there were 88.9 males age 18 and over.

The racial makeup of the county was 65.6% White, 27.5% Black or African American, 0.2% American Indian and Alaska Native, 0.2% Asian, 0.0% Native Hawaiian and Pacific Islander, 1.4% from some other race, and 4.9% from two or more races, while Hispanic or Latino residents of any race comprised 2.6% of the population.

Pemiscot County, Missouri – Racial and ethnic composition Note: the US Census treats Hispanic/Latino as an ethnic category. This table excludes Latinos from the racial categories and assigns them to a separate category. Hispanics/Latinos may be of any race.
Race / Ethnicity (NH = Non-Hispanic)	Pop 1980	Pop 1990	Pop 2000	Pop 2010	Pop 2020	% 1980	% 1990	% 2000	% 2010	% 2020
White alone (NH)	18,240	16,175	14,244	12,741	10,176	73.00%	73.79%	71.05%	69.64%	64.98%
Black or African American alone (NH)	6,492	5,575	5,231	4,879	4,297	25.98%	25.43%	26.09%	26.67%	27.44%
Native American or Alaska Native alone (NH)	25	33	46	37	29	0.10%	0.15%	0.23%	0.20%	0.19%
Asian alone (NH)	16	45	54	41	35	0.06%	0.21%	0.27%	0.22%	0.22%
Native Hawaiian or Pacific Islander alone (NH)	x	x	3	0	4	x	x	0.01%	0.00%	0.03%
Other race alone (NH)	31	4	8	8	35	0.12%	0.02%	0.04%	0.04%	0.22%
Mixed race or Multiracial (NH)	x	x	146	249	670	x	x	0.73%	1.36%	4.28%
Hispanic or Latino (any race)	183	89	315	341	415	0.73%	0.41%	1.57%	1.86%	2.65%
Total	24,987	21,921	20,047	18,296	15,661	100.00%	100.00%	100.00%	100.00%	100.00%

34.0% of residents lived in urban areas, while 66.0% lived in rural areas.

There were 6,442 households in the county, of which 31.6% had children under the age of 18 living with them and 36.6% had a female householder with no spouse or partner present. About 33.2% of all households were made up of individuals and 14.8% had someone living alone who was 65 years of age or older.

There were 7,484 housing units, of which 13.9% were vacant. Among occupied housing units, 53.3% were owner-occupied and 46.7% were renter-occupied. The homeowner vacancy rate was 2.7% and the rental vacancy rate was 10.3%.

=== 2000 census ===
As of the census of 2000, there were 20,047 people, 7,855 households, and 5,317 families residing in the county. The population density was 41 people per square mile (16 people/km^{2}). There were 8,793 housing units at an average density of 18 units per square mile (6.9/km^{2}). The racial makeup of the county was 71.76% White, 26.23% Black or African American, 0.25% Native American, 0.27% Asian, 0.01% Pacific Islander, 0.62% from other races, and 0.85% from two or more races. Approximately 1.57% of the population were Hispanic or Latino of any race. Among the major first ancestries reported in Pemiscot County were 31.9% American, 7.8% Irish, 5.6% English, and 5.5% German ancestry.

There were 7,855 households, out of which 33.60% had children under the age of 18 living with them, 45.00% were married couples living together, 18.50% had a female householder with no husband present, and 32.30% were non-families. 28.80% of all households were made up of individuals, and 14.30% had someone living alone who was 65 years of age or older. The average household size was 2.52 and the average family size was 3.10.

In the county, the population was spread out, with 30.00% under the age of 18, 9.10% from 18 to 24, 25.00% from 25 to 44, 21.10% from 45 to 64, and 14.90% who were 65 years of age or older. The median age was 34 years. For every 100 females there were 88.50 males. For every 100 females age 18 and over, there were 83.30 males.

The median income for a household in the county was $26,992, and the median income for a family was $33,945. Males had a median income of $27,476 versus $17,358 for females. The per capita income for the county was $15,599. About 24.80% of families and 30.40% of the population were below the poverty line, including 43.20% of those under age 18 and 23.20% of those age 65 or over.

=== Religion ===
According to the Association of Religion Data Archives County Membership Report (2000), Pemiscot County is a part of the Bible Belt with evangelical Protestantism being the majority religion. The most predominant denominations among residents in Pemiscot County who adhere to a religion are Southern Baptists (69.98%), Methodists (7.56%), and Churches of Christ (4.76%).

== Education ==
Of adults 25 years of age and older in Pemiscot County, 58.2% possess a high school diploma or higher, while 8.4% hold a bachelor's degree or higher as their greatest educational attainment.

School districts including sections of the county, no matter how slight, even if the relevant schools and/or administration buildings in another county:

- Caruthersville 18 School District
- Cooter R-IV School District
- Delta C-7 School District
- Hayti R-II School District
- Kennett 39 School District
- North Pemiscot County R-I School District
- Pemiscot County R-III School District
- South Pemiscot County R-V School District

=== Public schools ===
- Caruthersville School District 18 - Caruthersville
  - Caruthersville Elementary School (PK-05)
  - Caruthersville Middle School (06-08)
  - Caruthersville High School (09-12)
- Cooter R-IV School District - Cooter
  - Cooter Elementary School (K-06)
  - Cooter High School (07-12)
- Delta C-7 School District - Deering
  - Delta Elementary School (K-06)
  - Delta High School (07-12)
- Hayti R-II School District - Hayti
  - Mathis Elementary School (PK-03)
  - Wallace Elementary School (04-06)
  - Hayti High School (07-12)
- North Pemiscot County R-I School District - Wardell
  - Ross Elementary School - Portageville - (K-05)
  - North Pemiscot County High School - (06-12)
- South Pemiscot County R-V School District - Steele
  - South Pemiscot County Elementary School (K-06)
  - South Pemiscot County High School (07-12)

=== Alternative/vocational schools ===
- Diagnostic Center - Hayti - (K-12) - Special education
- External Locations - Hayti - (K-12) - Special education
- Oak View Learning Center - Hayti - (K-12) - Special education
- Pemiscot County Vocational School - Hayti - (11-12) - Vocational/technical

=== Public libraries ===
- Caruthersville Public Library
- Conran Memorial Library
- Steele Public Library

=== Colleges and universities ===
Three Rivers College's service area includes Pemiscot County.

== Communities ==
=== Cities ===
- Bragg City
- Caruthersville (county seat)
- Cooter
- Cottonwood Point
- Hayti
- Hayti Heights
- Holland
- Homestown
- Portageville (mostly in New Madrid County)
- Steele
- Wardell

=== Village ===
- Pascola

=== Former village ===
- North Wardell

=== Census-designated place ===
- Deering
- Denton
- Hayward

=== Other unincorporated places ===
- Acorn Corner
- Bakerville
- Braggadocio
- Channel
- Concord
- Covington
- Cunningham
- Gayoso
- Gibson
- Gobler
- Hermondale
- Ingram Ridge
- Kinfolks Ridge
- McCarty
- Micola
- Mid City
- Netherlands
- New Survey
- Oak Ridge
- Oakville
- Peach Orchard
- Samford
- Shade
- Stubtown
- Tyler
- Vicksburg
- Yama

== Politics ==
=== Local ===
The Democratic Party historically controlled politics at the local level in Pemiscot County. However, the county has not been immune to the growing Republican trend in Southeast Missouri. In 2020, two Democratic incumbents switched parties, and Lisa Bowlby Sheckell (R) was elected in a contested election for the County Assessor. The Democratic Party continues to hold a majority of offices as of 2022.

Pemiscot County, Missouri

Elected countywide officials
Assessor	Lisa Bowlby Sheckell	Republican
Circuit Clerk	Kelly Cagle Maners	Democratic
County Clerk	Pam Treece	Republican
Collector	Rhonda Parkinson Price	Republican
Commissioner (presiding)	Mark Cartee	Republican
Commissioner (district 1)	Noble Nelson	Democratic
Commissioner (district 2)	Baughn Meredith	Democratic
Coroner	James Brimhall	Democratic
Prosecuting Attorney	Steven Horton	Republican
Public Administrator	Trina Holloman	Republican
Recorder	Amanda Littleton-Gordon	Republican
Sheriff	Tommy Greenwell	Republican
Surveyor	Darrall Hirtz	Democratic
Treasurer	Frankie R. Stewart	Democratic

=== State ===
The northern half of Pemiscot County is a part of Missouri's 149th District in the Missouri House of Representatives and is currently represented by Don Rone Jr. (R-Portageville).

Missouri House – District 149 – Pemiscot County (2020)
Party	Candidate	Votes	%	±%
Republican	Don Rone		100.00%	

Missouri House – District 149 – Pemiscot County (2018)
Party	Candidate	Votes	%	±%
Republican	Don Rone	896	57.77%	
Democratic	William D. "Bill" Burlison	425	27.40%	
Independent	Jacqueline T. "Jackie" McGee	230	14.83%	

Missouri House – District 149 – Pemiscot County (2016)
Party	Candidate	Votes	%	±%
Republican	Don Rone	1,124	55.56%	
Democratic	Brantley Atchley	899	44.44%	

Missouri House – District 149 – Pemiscot County (2014)
Party	Candidate	Votes	%	±%
Democratic	William D. "Bill" Burlison	574	52.37%	
Republican	Don Rone	522	47.63%	

Past Gubernatorial Elections Results
Year	Republican	Democratic	Third Parties
2024	74.71% 3,800	23.57% 1,199	1.71% 87
2020	71.98% 4,030	26.61% 1,490	1.41% 79
2016	60.13% 3,534	37.59% 2,209	2.28% 134
2012	38.64% 2,338	58.83% 3,559	2.53% 153
2008	37.26% 2,491	60.50% 4,045	2.24% 150
2004	44.93% 2,965	53.46% 3,528	1.61% 106
2000	34.61% 2,053	63.80% 3,784	1.59% 94
1996	26.24% 1,461	72.31% 4,026	1.45% 81
1992	34.78% 2,275	65.22% 4,267	0.00% 0
1988	48.65% 3,033	50.87% 3,171	0.48% 30
1984	46.17% 3,112	53.83% 3,629	0.00% 0
1980	42.25% 3,067	57.60% 4,181	0.15% 11
1976	40.99% 2,743	58.86% 3,939	0.15% 10
1972	45.48% 2,940	54.37% 3,515	0.15% 10
1968	24.91% 1,714	75.09% 5.168	0.00% 0
1964	26.57% 1,922	73.43% 5,311	0.00% 0
1960	26.53% 2,986	73.47% 8,271	0.00% 0

The southern half of Pemiscot County is a part of Missouri's 150th District in the Missouri House of Representatives and is currently represented by Andrew McDaniel (R-Deering).

Missouri House – District 150 – Pemiscot County (2020)
Party	Candidate	Votes	%	±%
Republican	Andrew McDaniel		100.00%	

Missouri House – District 150 – Pemiscot County (2018)
Party	Candidate	Votes	%	±%
Republican	Andrew McDaniel	2,004	68.07%	
Democratic	Josh Rittenberry	940	31.93%	

Missouri House – District 150 – Pemiscot County (2016)
Party	Candidate	Votes	%	±%
Republican	Andrew McDaniel	2,466	64.55%	
Democratic	Lena Samford	1,354	35.45%	

Missouri House – District 150 – Pemiscot County (2014)
Party	Candidate	Votes	%	±%
Republican	Andrew McDaniel	1,186	60.76%	
Democratic	Walter Dearing	766	39.24%	

All of Pemiscot County is a part of Missouri's 25th District in the Missouri Senate and is currently represented by Republican Jason Bean of Poplar Bluff. The 25th Senatorial District consists of Butler, Carter, Dunklin, Mississippi, New Madrid, Pemiscot, Shannon, and Stoddard counties.

Missouri Senate – District 25 – Pemiscot County (2020)
Party	Candidate	Votes	%	±%
Republican	Jason Bean		100%	

Missouri Senate – District 25 – Pemiscot County (2016)
Party	Candidate	Votes	%	±%
Republican	Doug Libla	3,247	56.86%	
Democratic	William D. "Bill" Burlison	2,461	43.11%	

Missouri Senate – District 25 – Pemiscot County (2012)
Party	Candidate	Votes	%	±%
Democratic	Terry Swinger	3,987	65.07%	
Republican	Doug Libla	2,140	34.93%	

=== Federal ===
Pemiscot County is included in Missouri's 8th Congressional District and is currently represented by Jason T. Smith (R-Salem) in the U.S. House of Representatives. Smith won a special election on Tuesday, June 4, 2013, to finish out the remaining term of U.S. Representative Jo Ann Emerson (R-Cape Girardeau). Emerson announced her resignation a month after being reelected with over 70 percent of the vote in the district. She resigned to become CEO of the National Rural Electric Cooperative.

United States presidential election results for Pemiscot County, Missouri
Year	Republican		Democratic		Third party(ies)	
Year	No.	%	No.	%	No.	%
1888	168	21.88%	599	77.99%	1	0.13%
1892	133	15.74%	700	82.84%	12	1.42%
1896	355	21.94%	1,260	77.87%	3	0.19%
1900	655	32.23%	1,370	67.42%	7	0.34%
1904	923	39.39%	1,375	58.69%	45	1.92%
1908	1,390	43.93%	1,725	54.52%	49	1.55%
1912	973	30.75%	1,617	51.11%	574	18.14%
1916	2,076	44.93%	2,447	52.95%	98	2.12%
1920	4,443	52.56%	3,901	46.15%	109	1.29%
1924	4,811	45.50%	5,616	53.12%	146	1.38%
1928	6,256	54.33%	5,259	45.67%	0	0.00%
1932	4,415	35.73%	7,909	64.01%	32	0.26%
1936	4,139	33.58%	8,171	66.30%	14	0.11%
1940	6,011	38.90%	9,391	60.77%	51	0.33%
1944	4,333	36.93%	7,380	62.90%	20	0.17%
1948	2,249	17.95%	10,269	81.98%	8	0.06%
1952	4,118	31.57%	8,913	68.34%	12	0.09%
1956	3,969	32.98%	8,064	67.02%	0	0.00%
1960	4,464	37.91%	7,312	62.09%	0	0.00%
1964	2,658	34.34%	5,083	65.66%	0	0.00%
1968	2,191	28.01%	2,681	34.28%	2,950	37.71%
1972	4,697	69.96%	2,017	30.04%	0	0.00%
1976	2,541	35.12%	4,681	64.69%	14	0.19%
1980	3,519	45.51%	4,140	53.54%	73	0.94%
1984	3,733	53.13%	3,293	46.87%	0	0.00%
1988	3,066	48.18%	3,288	51.67%	10	0.16%
1992	2,161	31.93%	3,924	57.98%	683	10.09%
1996	1,820	32.06%	3,371	59.38%	486	8.56%
2000	2,750	45.38%	3,245	53.55%	65	1.07%
2004	3,398	49.93%	3,381	49.68%	27	0.40%
2008	3,954	56.11%	3,029	42.98%	64	0.91%
2012	3,598	56.80%	2,671	42.16%	66	1.04%
2016	3,964	65.60%	1,947	32.22%	132	2.18%
2020	4,120	71.84%	1,560	27.20%	55	0.96%
2024	3,917	74.33%	1,331	25.26%	22	0.42%

U.S. House of Representatives - District 8 – Pemiscot County (2020)
Party	Candidate	Votes	%	±%
Republican	Jason T. Smith	3,953	71.83%	
Democratic	Kathy Ellis	1,488	27.04%	
Libertarian	Tom Schmitz	62	1.13%	

U.S. House of Representatives - District 8 – Pemiscot County (2018)
Party	Candidate	Votes	%	±%
Republican	Jason T. Smith	2,985	66.70%	
Democratic	Kathy Ellis	1,455	32.51%	
Libertarian	Jonathan Shell	35	0.78%	

U.S. House of Representatives - District 8 – Pemiscot County (2016)
Party	Candidate	Votes	%	±%
Republican	Jason T. Smith	3,638	63.90%	
Democratic	Dave Cowell	1,945	34.16%	
Libertarian	Jonathan Shell	108	1.90%	

U.S. House of Representatives - District 8 – Pemiscot County (2014)
Party	Candidate	Votes	%	±%
Republican	Jason T. Smith	1,695	57.67%	
Democratic	Barbara Stocker	1,013	34.47%	
Libertarian	Rick Vandeven	43	1.46%	
Constitution	Doug Enyart	47	1.60%	
Independent	Terry Hampton	140	4.76%	

U.S. House of Representatives - District 8 - Special Election – Pemiscot County (2013)
Party	Candidate	Votes	%	±%
Republican	Jason T. Smith	506	58.36%	
Democratic	Steve Hodges	338	38.99%	
Constitution	Doug Enyart	13	1.50%	
Libertarian	Bill Slantz	10	1.15%	

U.S. House of Representatives - District 8 – Pemiscot County (2012)
Party	Candidate	Votes	%	±%
Republican	Jo Ann Emerson	3,782	62.57%	−0.25
Democratic	Jack Rushin	2,184	36.14%	+0.95
Libertarian	Rick Vandeven	78	1.29%	+0.51

Pemiscot County, along with the rest of the state of Missouri, is represented in the U.S. Senate by Josh Hawley (R-Columbia) and Roy Blunt (R-Strafford).

U.S. Senate – Class I – Pemiscot County (2018)
Party	Candidate	Votes	%	±%
Republican	Josh Hawley	2,968	65.49%	
Democratic	Claire McCaskill	1,458	32.17%	
Libertarian	Japheth Campbell	38	0.84%	
Independent	Craig O'Dear	41	0.90%	
Green	Jo Crain	27	0.60%	

Blunt was elected to a second term in 2016 over then-Missouri Secretary of State Jason Kander.

U.S. Senate - Class III - Pemiscot County (2016)
Party	Candidate	Votes	%	±%
Republican	Roy Blunt	3,476	59.36%	
Democratic	Jason Kander	2,203	37.62%	
Libertarian	Jonathan Dine	89	1.52%	
Green	Johnathan McFarland	57	0.97%	
Constitution	Fred Ryman	29	0.50%	

==== Political culture ====
At the presidential level, Pemiscot County, lying in the Missouri Bootheel (one of the regions in Missouri most associated with the American South), was powerfully Democratic from shortly after the Civil War through 2000. From 1868 through 2000, it voted Republican only in Harding's, Hoover's, Nixon's, and Reagan's national landslides in 1920, 1928, 1972, and 1984, respectively. In 1968, it was the only county in Missouri to vote for George Wallace.

In 2004, George W. Bush flipped the county from blue to red, albeit narrowly, and since then, the county has solidified its standing as a Republican bastion. As of 2020, the county has voted Republican five times in a row, with the Republican vote share increasing in every election. In 2008, Pemiscot County swung the most Republican of all the counties in the state, as McCain improved on Bush's vote share by fully 6.2%, already besting not only Bush but every Republican to have carried the county in at least the prior hundred years apart from Nixon in 1972. In 2020, Donald Trump posted the best showing for a Republican in the county in at least over a century, with his nearly 72% exceeding Nixon's 70%. Similarly to other highly rural Southern counties in the 21st century, the Democratic raw vote total has decreased in every election since then as well.

As in most rural areas throughout Missouri, voters in Pemiscot County generally adhere to socially and culturally conservative principles, but are more moderate or populist on economic issues, typical of the Dixiecrat philosophy. In 2004, Missourians voted on a constitutional amendment to define marriage as the union between a man and a woman—it passed Pemiscot County with 84.73 percent of the vote. The initiative passed the state with 71 percent of support from voters, as Missouri became the first state to ban same-sex marriage. In 2006, Missourians voted on a constitutional amendment to fund and legalize embryonic stem cell research in the state—it failed in Pemiscot County, with 52.41 percent voting against the measure. The initiative narrowly passed the state with 51 percent of support from voters, as Missouri became one of the first states in the nation to approve embryonic stem cell research. Despite Pemiscot County's longstanding tradition of supporting socially conservative platforms, voters in the county have a penchant for advancing populist causes, such as increasing the minimum wage. In 2006, Missourians voted on a proposition (Proposition B) to increase the minimum wage in the state to $6.50 an hour—it passed Pemiscot County with 78.01 percent of the vote. The proposition strongly passed every single county in Missouri with 78.99 percent voting in favor as the minimum wage was increased to $6.50 an hour in the state. During the same election, voters in five other states strongly approved increases in the minimum wage.

=== Missouri presidential preference primary (2008) ===
In the 2008 presidential primary, voters in Pemiscot County from both political parties supported candidates who finished in second place in the state at large and nationally. Former U.S. Senator Hillary Clinton (D-New York) received more votes, a total of 1,270, than any candidate from either party in Pemiscot County during the 2008 presidential primary. She also received more votes than the total number of votes cast in the entire Republican Primary in Pemiscot County.

== See also ==
- National Register of Historic Places listings in Pemiscot County, Missouri
