= Cooter, Missouri =

- City
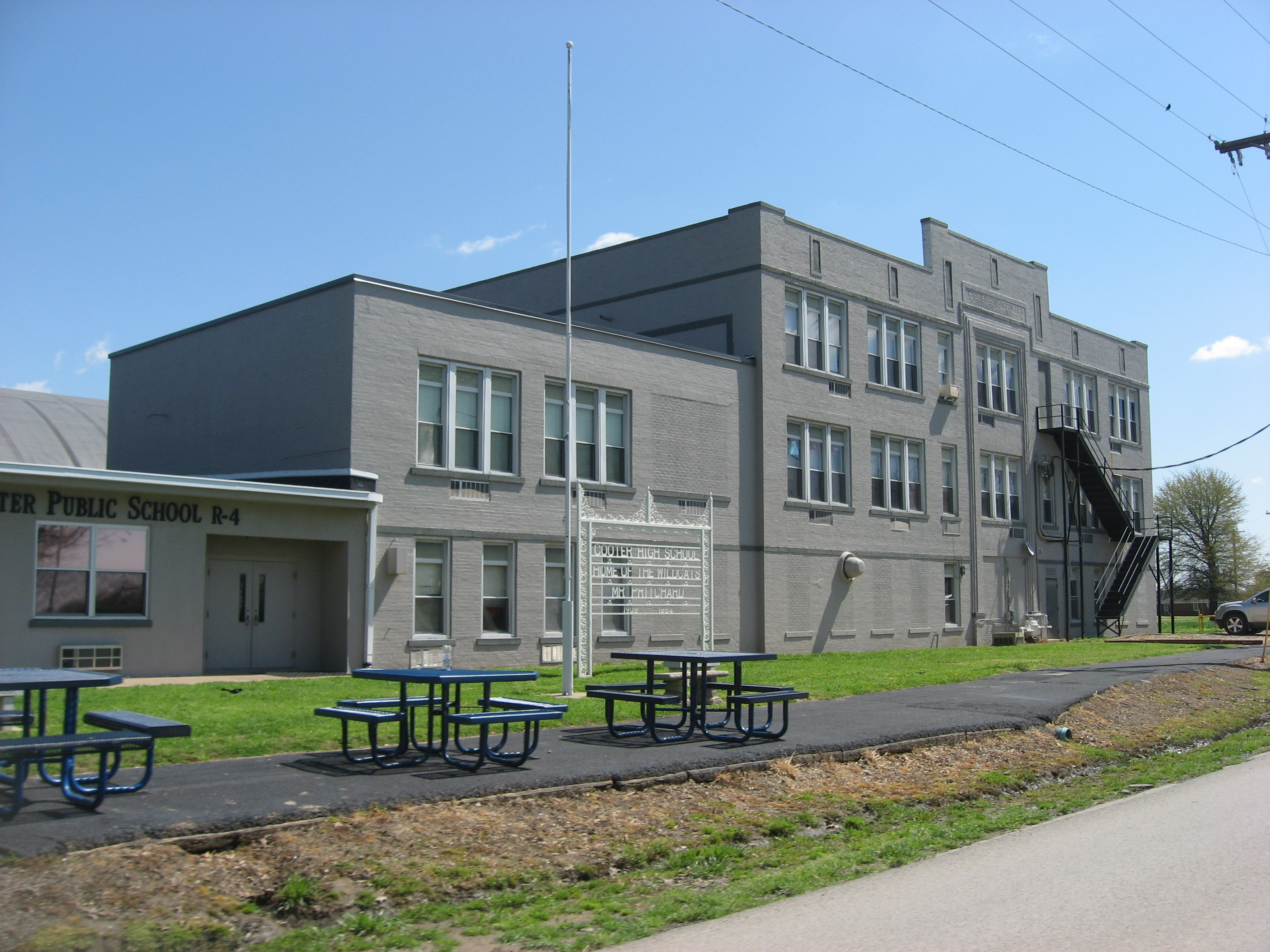
- Cooter High School

- Location of Cooter, Missouri
- Coordinates: 36°02′48″N 89°48′33″W
- Country: United States
- State: Missouri
- County: Pemiscot

Area
  - Total: 0.29 sq mi (0.76 km^{2})
  - Land: 0.29 sq mi (0.76 km^{2})
  - Water: 0 sq mi (0.00 km^{2})
- Elevation: 262 ft (80 m)

Population (2020)
  - Total: 343
  - Density: 1,161.6/sq mi (448.51/km^{2})
- Time zone: UTC-6 (Central (CST))
  - Summer (DST): UTC-5 (CDT)
- ZIP code: 63839
- Area code: 573
- FIPS code: 29-16336
- GNIS feature ID: 2393630

Cooter is a city in Pemiscot County, Missouri, United States. The population was 343 at the 2020 census.

== History ==
According to Houck's History of Missouri, the town of Cooter was named in 1854 for the Coutre (pronounced "Coo-Tra") family, headed by Frenchman Portell Coutre of New Madrid, Missouri.

In 1942, an auxiliary airfield was constructed on the west side of the city as part of Blytheville Army Airfield. In August 1946, the airfield was closed with the declaration of the main air base as surplus property by the War Assets Administration. At the time, doubt was expressed by local leaders that the field would be developed into a municipal airport.

== Geography ==
Cooter is located in the southeast corner of the Missouri Bootheel on Missouri Route E 1.5 miles east of I-55. The Missouri-Arkansas border is three miles to the south and the Mississippi River lies six miles east.

According to the United States Census Bureau, the city has a total area of 0.30 square miles (0.78 km^{2}), all land.

== Demographics ==
Historical population
| Census | Pop. | Note | %± |
|---|---|---|---|
| 1920 | 540 | | — |
| 1930 | 453 | | −16.1% |
| 1940 | 466 | | 2.9% |
| 1950 | 490 | | 5.2% |
| 1960 | 477 | | −2.7% |
| 1970 | 414 | | −13.2% |
| 1980 | 479 | | 15.7% |
| 1990 | 451 | | −5.8% |
| 2000 | 440 | | −2.4% |
| 2010 | 469 | | 6.6% |
| 2020 | 343 | | −26.9% |
U.S. Decennial Census

=== 2010 census ===
As of the census of 2010, there were 469 people, 175 households, and 133 families living in the city. The population density was 1,563.3 inhabitants per square mile (603.6/km^{2}). There were 191 housing units at an average density of 636.7 per square mile (245.8/km^{2}). The racial makeup of the city was 97.87% White, 1.92% Black or African American, and 0.21% from two or more races. Hispanic or Latino of any race were 0.43% of the population.

There were 175 households, of which 45.7% had children under the age of 18 living with them, 49.7% were married couples living together, 19.4% had a female householder with no husband present, 6.9% had a male householder with no wife present, and 24.0% were non-families. 19.4% of all households were made up of individuals, and 10.9% had someone living alone who was 65 years of age or older. The average household size was 2.68 and the average family size was 3.05.

The median age in the city was 35.5 years. 28.4% of residents were under the age of 18; 8.2% were between the ages of 18 and 24; 28.1% were from 25 to 44; 22.9% were from 45 to 64; and 12.4% were 65 years of age or older. The gender makeup of the city was 48.4% male and 51.6% female.

=== 2000 census ===
As of the census of 2000, there were 440 people, 176 households, and 118 families living in the city. The population density was 1,492.5 inhabitants per square mile (576.3/km^{2}). There were 200 housing units at an average density of 678.4 per square mile (261.9/km^{2}). The racial makeup of the city was 98.18% White, 0.45% African American, 0.68% Native American, 0.23% from other races, and 0.45% from two or more races. Hispanic or Latino of any race were 0.91% of the population.

There were 176 households, out of which 31.3% had children under the age of 18 living with them, 51.1% were married couples living together, 11.9% had a female householder with no husband present, and 32.4% were non-families. 26.1% of all households were made up of individuals, and 15.9% had someone living alone who was 65 years of age or older. The average household size was 2.50 and the average family size was 3.03.

In the city the population was spread out, with 25.2% under the age of 18, 8.6% from 18 to 24, 26.6% from 25 to 44, 22.5% from 45 to 64, and 17.0% who were 65 years of age or older. The median age was 37 years. For every 100 females there were 96.4 males. For every 100 females age 18 and over, there were 97.0 males.

The median income for a household in the city was $28,750, and the median income for a family was $32,955. Males had a median income of $26,429 versus $18,500 for females. The per capita income for the city was $13,267. About 16.1% of families and 20.6% of the population were below the poverty line, including 18.8% of those under age 18 and 19.2% of those age 65 or over.

== Education ==
It is in the Cooter R-IV School District.

Three Rivers College's service area includes Pemiscot County.

== Notable people ==
- Marvin Childers (born 1961), Arkansas state representative
- Greg Razer (born 1978), Missouri state senator
