= Blytheville Air Force Base =

US Air Force base near Blytheville, Arkansas

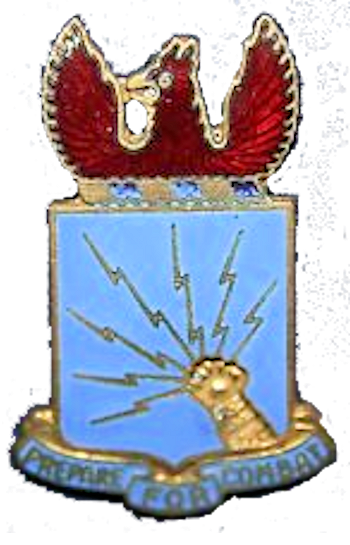
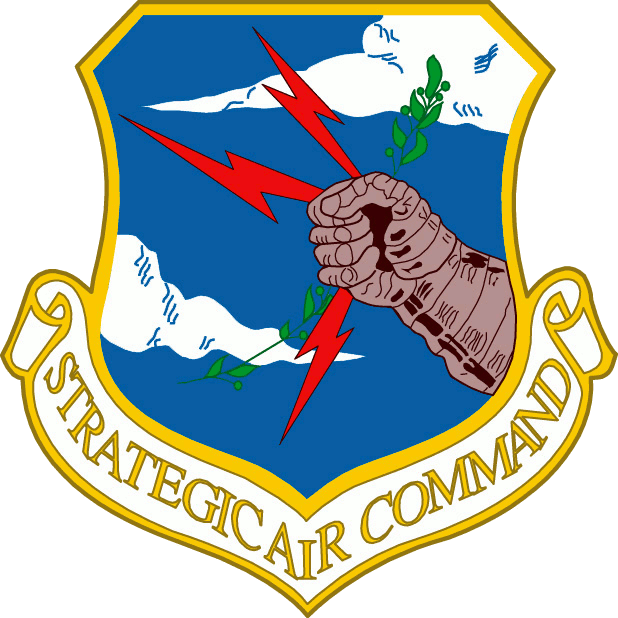
Eaker Air Force Base Blytheville Air Force Base Blytheville Army Airfield
- Part of Strategic Air Command/Tactical Air Command
- Blytheville, Arkansas
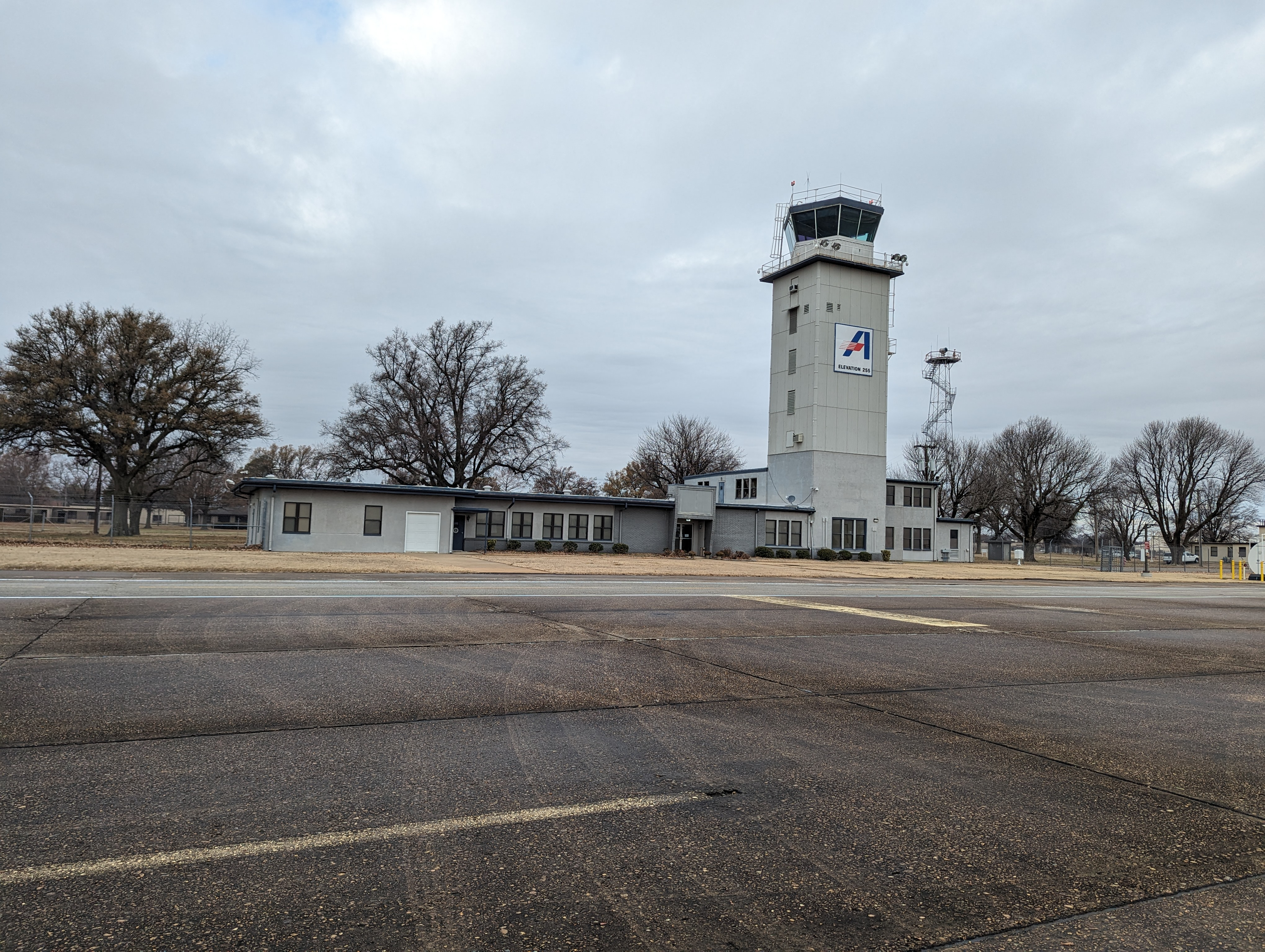
- The former base's control tower

Site information
- Type: Air Force Base
- Controlled by: Army Air Forces Eastern Flying Training Command (1942-1945) Continental Air Forces (1945-1946) Air Materiel Command (1946); Tactical Air Command (1954–1958) Strategic Air Command (1959–1991)

Location
- Location within Arkansas Location within the United States
- Coordinates: 35°57′52″N 89°56′38″W

Site history
- Built: Blytheville Army Airfield - May 10, 1942; Blytheville Air Force Base - August 9, 1954
- In use: 1942–1946, 1953–1992

Garrison information
- Occupants: 25th Two-Engine Flying Training Group (1942-1945) 461st Bombardment Wing (1956–1958) 97th Bombardment Wing (1959–1991)

Blytheville Air Force Base was a United States Air Force base that operated under the Tactical Air Command and Strategic Air Command from 1954 until its closure in 1992. The facility originally served as a B-25 pilot training school during WW2. For the majority of its operation, the base served as a home for SAC's B-52 ground alert program. In 1988, the facility was renamed Eaker Air Force Base in honor of World War II General of the Eighth Air Force, Ira C. Eaker. It was located 3 miles (4.8 km) northwest of Blytheville, Arkansas. The facility now operates as the Arkansas Aeroplex and Arkansas International Airport.

== History ==
=== Construction and World War 2 ===
Constructed on former agricultural land, the site was originally activated as the Blytheville Army Airfield in 1942. During World War II, the site served as a training airfield as part of the 70,000 Pilot Training Program. It was one of many air fields created in the country's interior during the war for this purpose. Blytheville, Arkansas was selected as a training location due to its proximity to the Mississippi River, where supplies could easily be shipped to and from the site. Construction of the airfield at Blytheville was quicker than other pilot schools in Arkansas, so the first groups to train at the base were originally intended for Walnut Ridge Army Airfield and Helena Aerotech for their basic training. There were also additional auxiliary airfields at Luxora, AR, Manilla, AR, Hornersville, MO, Steele, MO, and Cooter, MO.

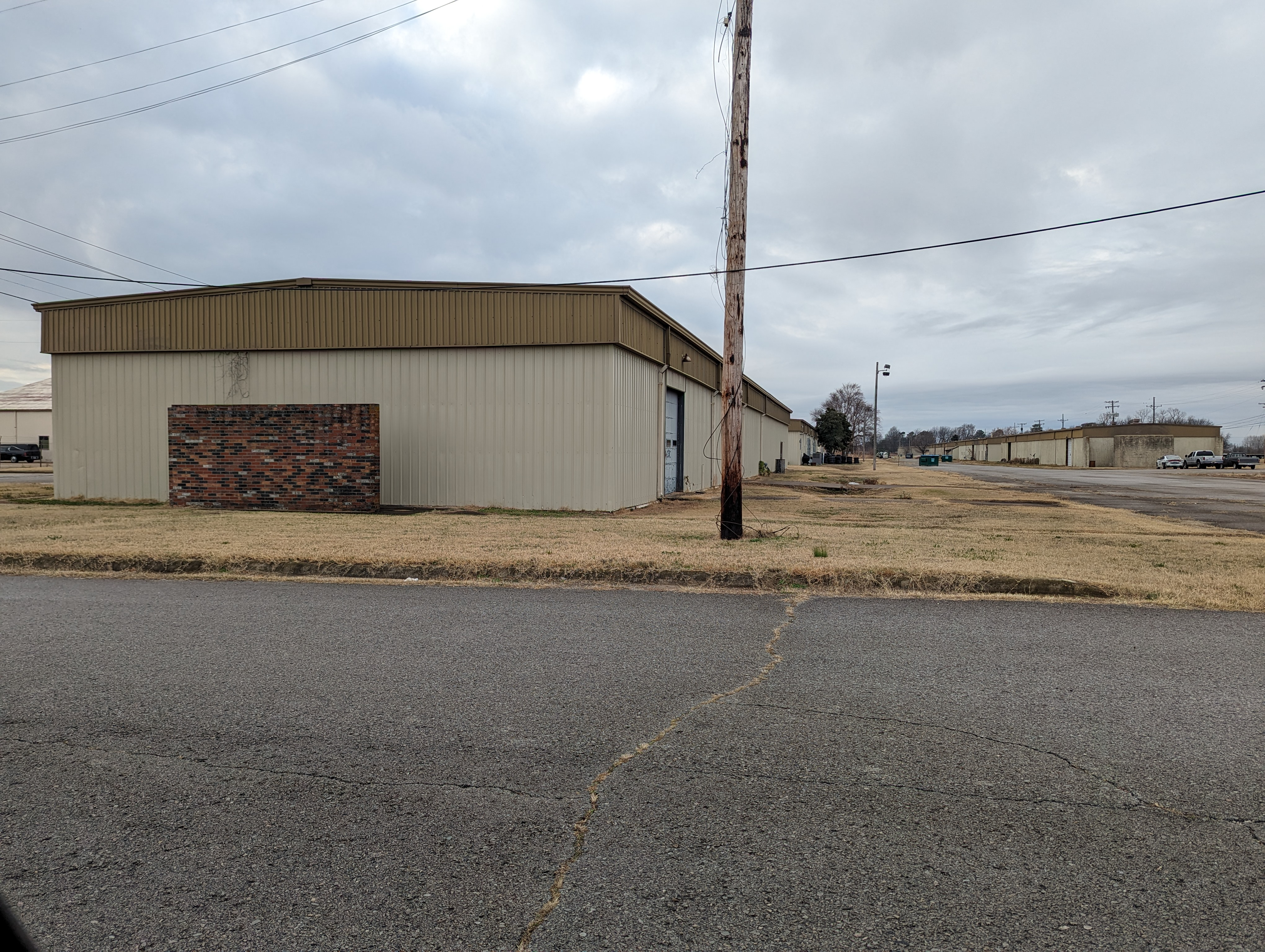
Buildings 430, 431, 432, 438, 439, and 440. These warehouses were constructed in 1942, and are the only WW2 era buildings left on the property.

The first casualty of the flight school was Herbert Perkins, a native of Virginia whose BT-13 crashed near the intermediate air field at Luxora, AR. The airfield was used as the Southeastern Training Command's flight training school. Cadets trained on the AT-6, AT-9, and AT-10 to learn to fly the B-25. Additionally, the flight school hosted a small number of TB-25Gs, a trainer version of the B-25. In 1945, the base also hosted a glider school to train servicemen to fly the Waco CG-4. The airfield closed in October 1945 after the Second World War ended. Then the airfield briefly became a processing center for the rapid demobilization of military personnel being discharged. The War Assets Administration officially closed down the installation in 1946, at which point control and responsibility for the land was transferred to the city of Blytheville.

=== Reopening under Tactical Air Command ===
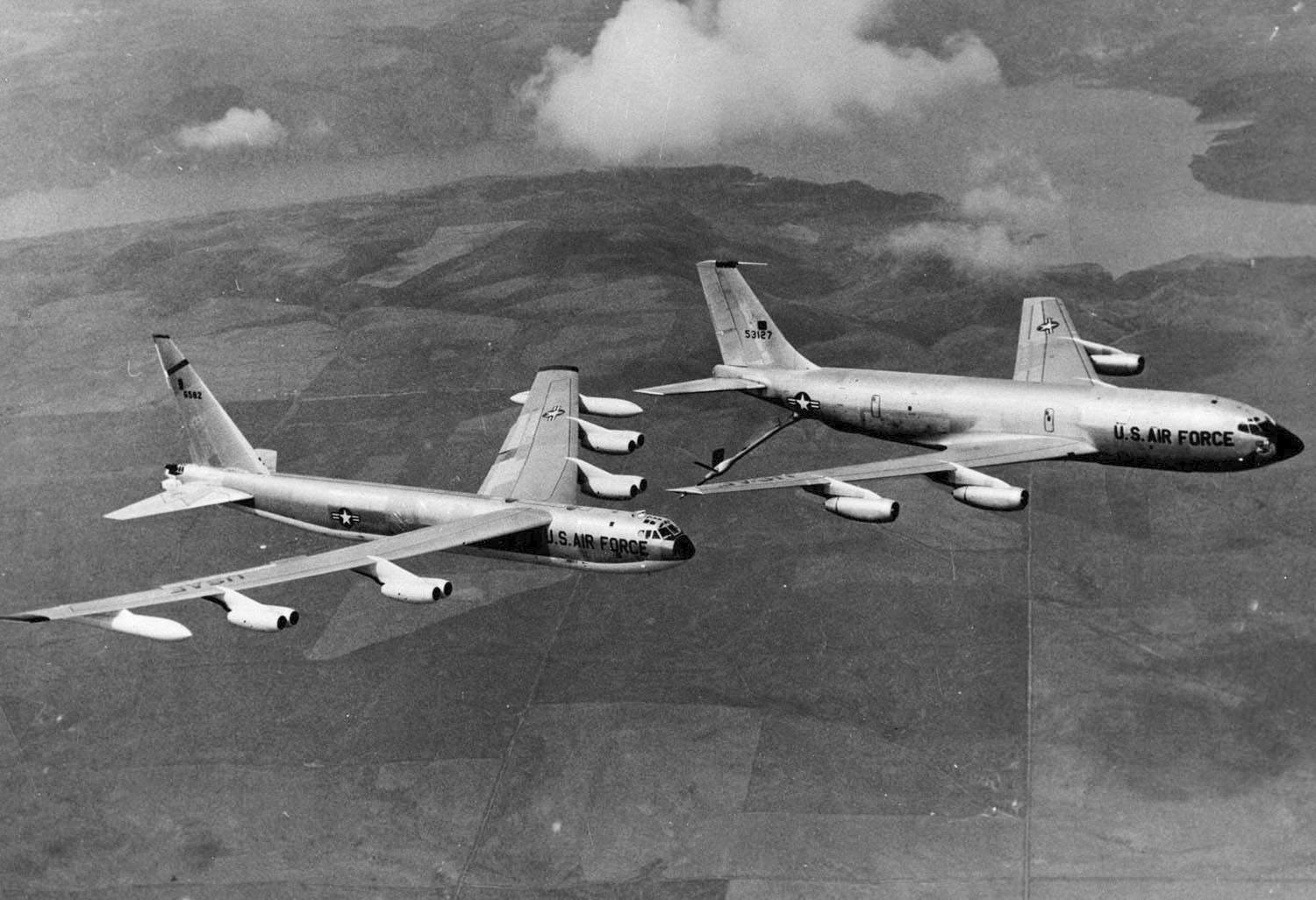
A Cold War-era image of a B-52 being refueled by a KC-135

On 15 July 1955, the facility was reopened by the Tactical Air Command as Blytheville Air Force Base (AFB), when the 461st Bombardment Wing was moved from Hill Air Force Base in Utah. Blytheville AFB became fully operational when it was equipped with a wing of three squadrons of B-57 bombers on 19 July 1955. While the 461st never saw any combat during its time at Blytheville Air Force Base, it was assigned to a number of training exercises and experiments. The 461st Wing's B-57Bs participated on Operation Sagebrush, Operation Redwing, Operation Mobile Charlie, Operation Counter Punch, and Operation Able Vista.

=== Transfer to Strategic Air Command ===
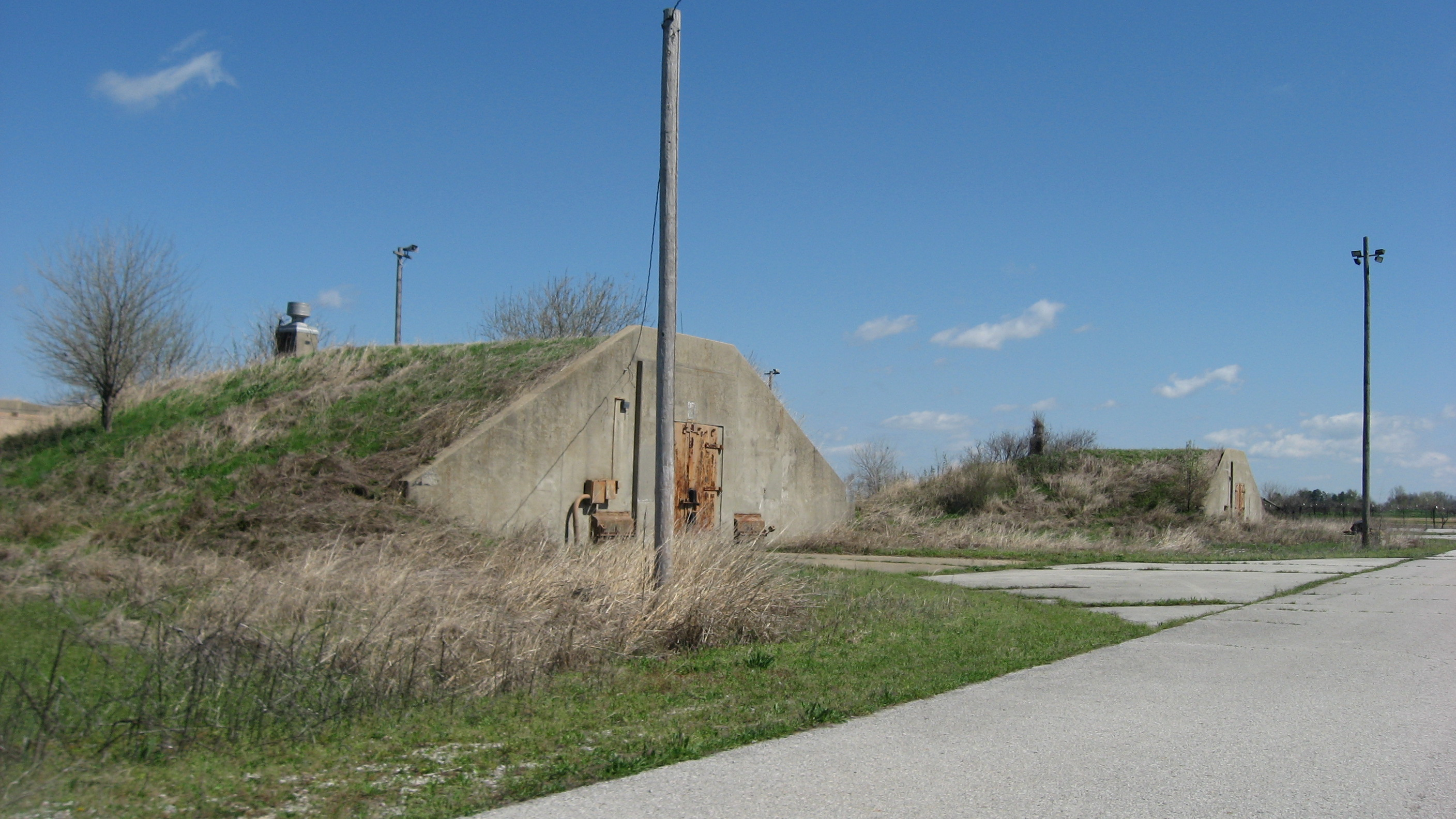
Bunkers used to store nuclear weapons at Blytheville (Eaker) Air Force Base

On April 1, 1958, the base was formally transferred into the Strategic Air Command, as part of a planned expansion of the B-52 bomber program. In July 1959, the 97th Bombardment Wing subsequently assumed control of the base and brought with it the long-range B-52G bomber and the KC-135A Stratotanker aerial refueling aircraft to support bomber operations and SAC's ground alert program. A Ready Alert Facility was constructed on the base in 1960, similar to others being built all over America at the time. Blytheville AFB experienced a great deal of activity throughout the Cold War era. The base was taken to a heightened state of alert on three occasions. First, the 4229th Air Base Unit was taken to a "personnel alert" during the 1958 Lebanon Crisis. Second, the base was taken to DEFCON 2 and the 97th Bombardment Wing was placed on airborne alert on 22 October 1962, during the Cuban Missile Crisis. Two B-52G bombers were readied to strike the Soviet Union with nuclear weapons if necessary—for which the wing received the Air Force Outstanding Unit Award for its performance during the crisis. And third, the base was taken to DEFCON 3 in 1973 during the Yom Kippur War.

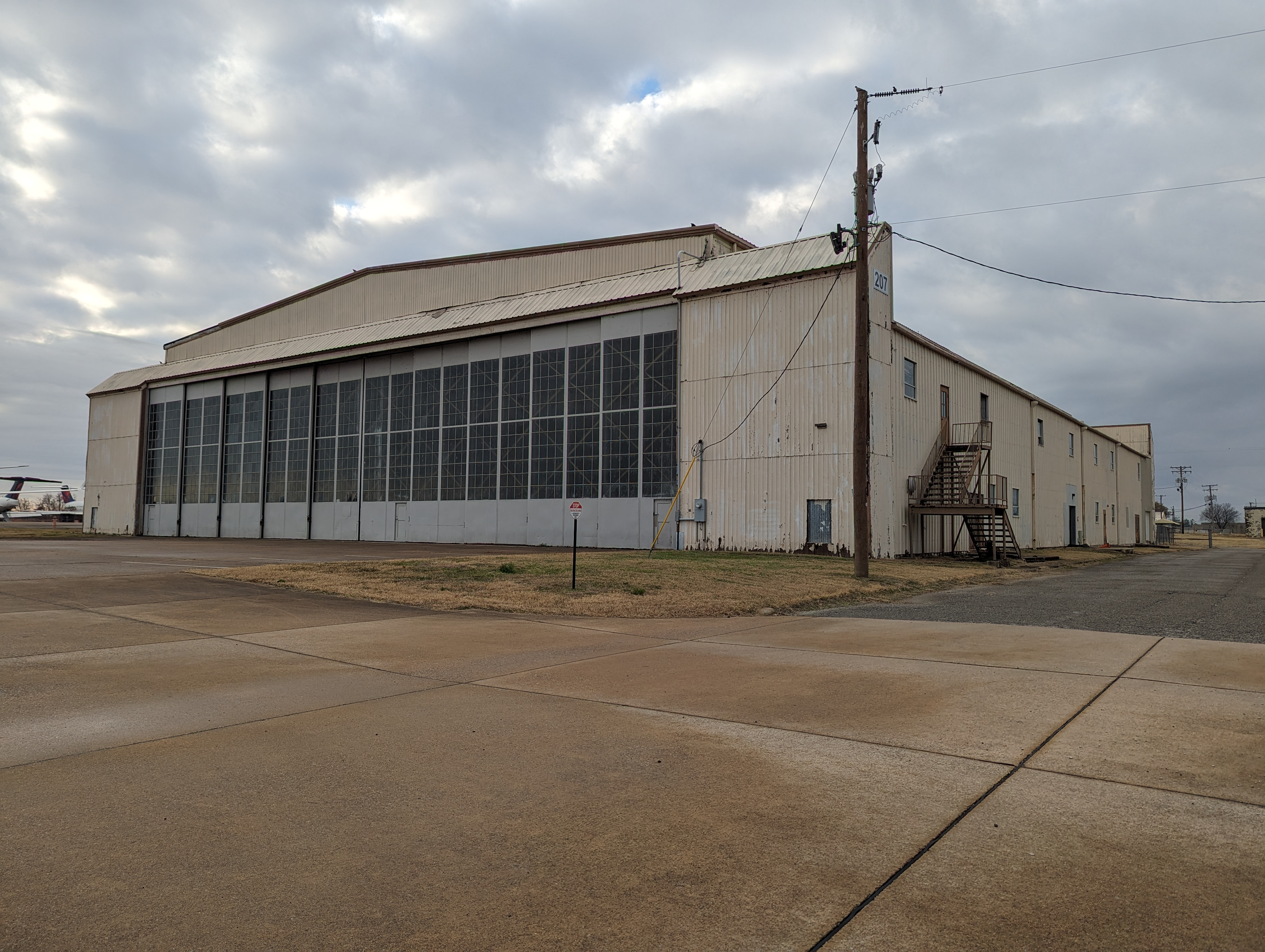
Hangar 207 was constructed in 1954 for B-57 maintenance. It later served as the headquarters for the 97th Organizational Maintenance Squadron

During the Vietnam War the 97th Bomber Wing at Blytheville supported strike operations throughout the late 1960s and early 1970s. A bomber crew from Blytheville was among the first shot down during Operation Linebacker II, a December 1972 mission targeting complexes in North Vietnam. Three crewmen died in the crash. Six more men from the 97th were also lost in Vietnam, whose names are recognized on a memorial placard at the former base. In 1972, all of the bombers were temporarily moved to Guam before being returned to Blytheville AFB, at which time the installation resumed normal functions. It launched rescue missions from the base to Grenada in 1983 and in August 1990, the pilots of the 97th Bomber Wing began practicing for missions in the Middle East and eventually supported Operation Desert Storm.

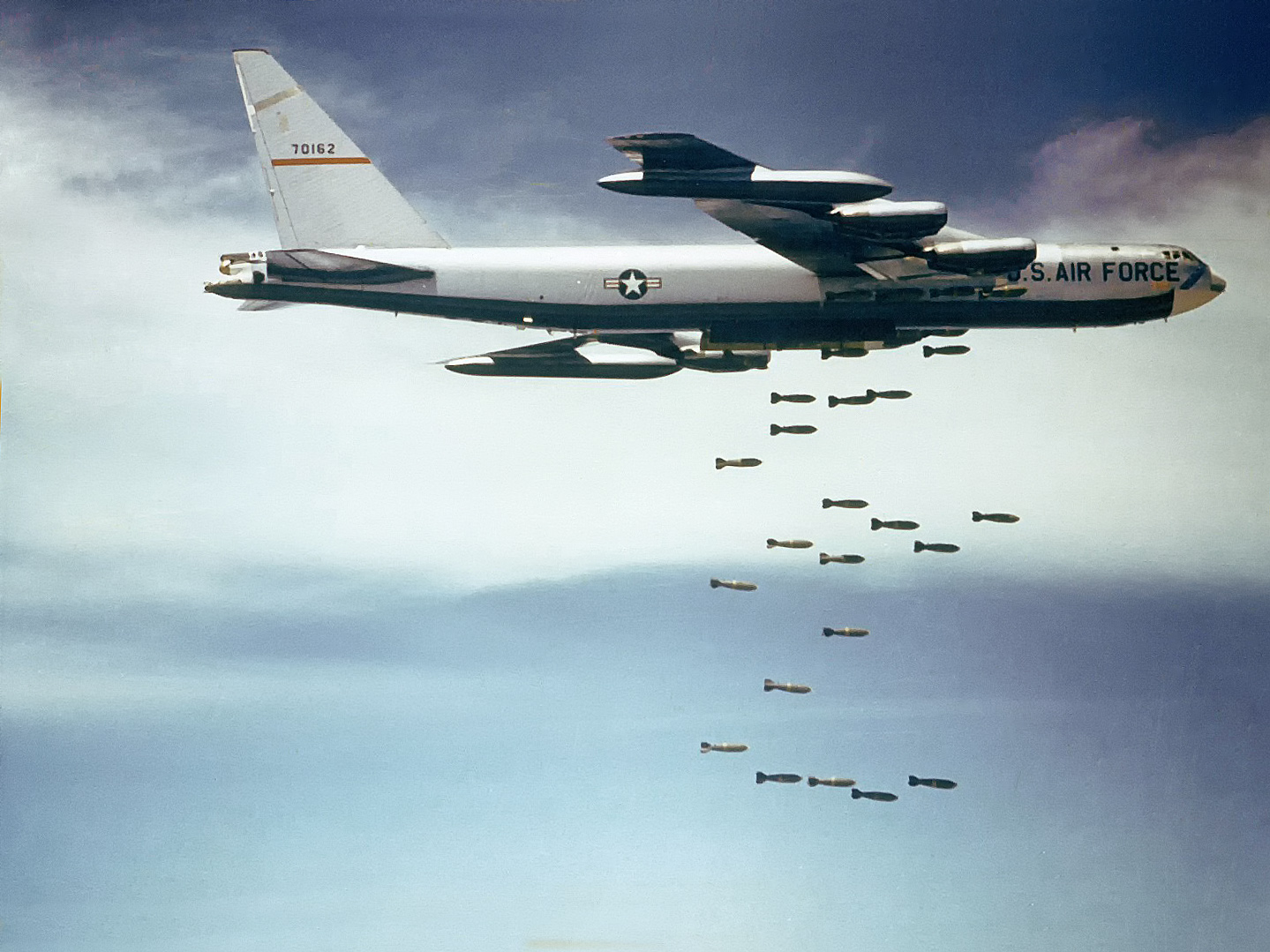
B-52 releasing its payload over Vietnam

=== Renamed Eaker AFB and base closure ===
In 1988, the U.S. Air Force officially renamed Blytheville AFB to Eaker AFB in commemoration of World War II General Ira Eaker, the former commander of the 8th Air Force. Officials had hoped, after hearing rumors of the base's possible closure, that the name would endear the base among military leaders and be enough to incentivize its continued existence. Unfortunately, Eaker Air Force Base topped the Strategic Air Command's list of base closures in 1991 and with the Cold War coming to an end, the installation was officially chosen; in March 1992, the last aircraft left the base. Extensive efforts to offset the negative economic effects on the community of Blytheville were undertaken by local and federal officials, who cleaned up the site and then distributed the land to various organizations, including the Department of the Interior (DOI), the Fish and Wildlife Service (FWS), and the Department of Veterans Affairs (VA). Some of the land has since been declared a National Historic Landmark.

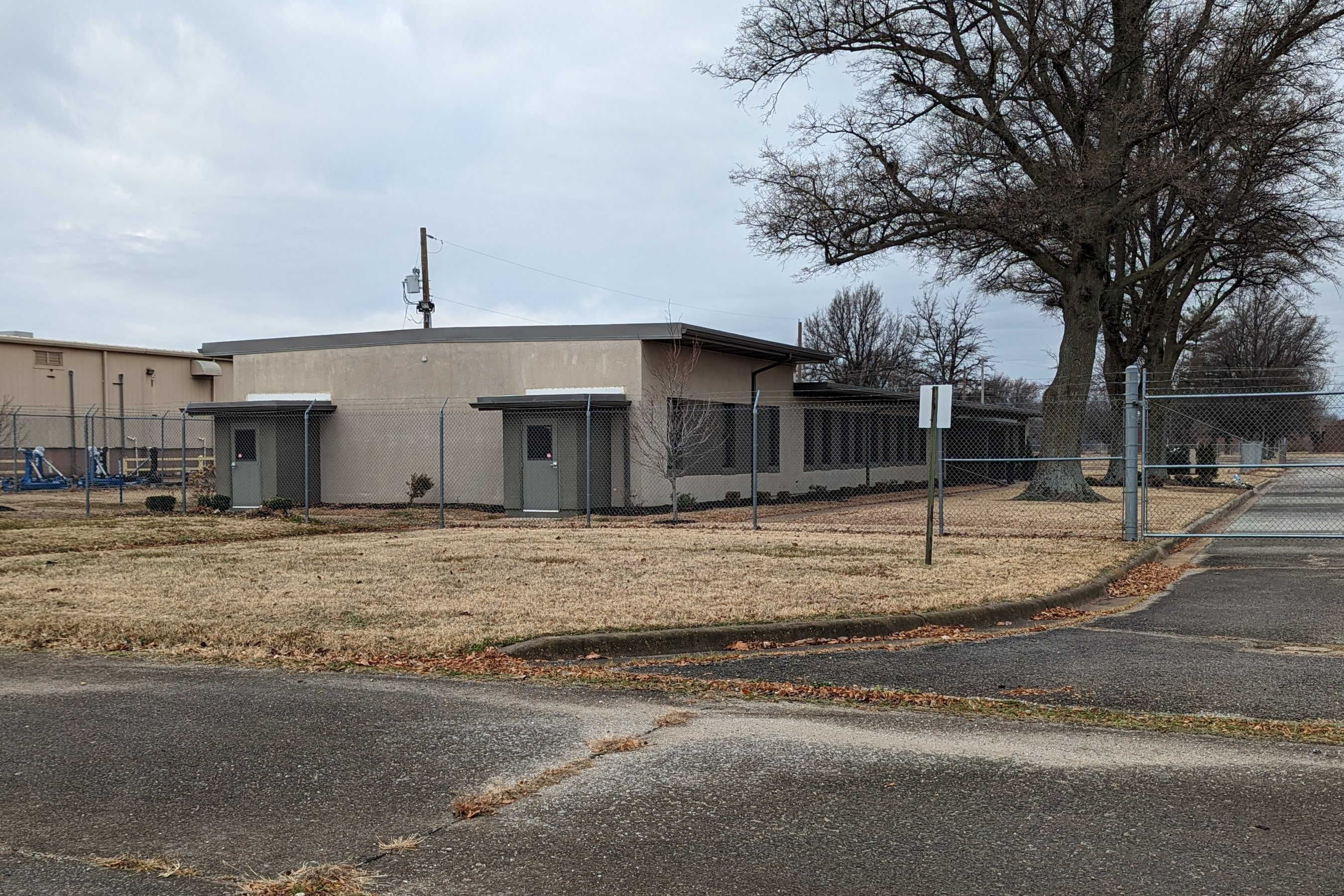
Building 202 was constructed in 1954 as a pilot training center for the 461st BMS. It now houses the BAFB Exhibition, the first permanent exhibit of the National Cold War Center

The base closure cost the community over 700 civilian jobs, but half of these were recovered through the adaptive reuse of the former base, such as United States Post Office's utilization of the base in the late 1990s as an airport hub during the holidays, some of the base housing being converted by Westminster Village of the Mid-South for a retirement community, the construction of a $2.5 million sports complex by the local community, and the private investment of some $3 million for the creation of the Thunder Bayou Golf Course.

=== Arkansas Aeroplex and The National Cold War Center ===
Within a decade of the base's closure, the facility was reopened as the Arkansas Aeroplex, also known as the Arkansas International Airport. The main tenant of the Aeroplex is Aviation Repair Technologies, which specializes in large aircraft repair.

In 2020, the National Cold War Center was created by local citizens to take the base's former SAC Alert Facility and turn it into the primary exhibit for a museum that focused on the many aspects of the Cold War.

== Historic Districts ==
- Blytheville Air Force Base Strategic Air Command (SAC) Alert and Weapons Storage Areas Historic District
- U.S. National Register of Historic Places
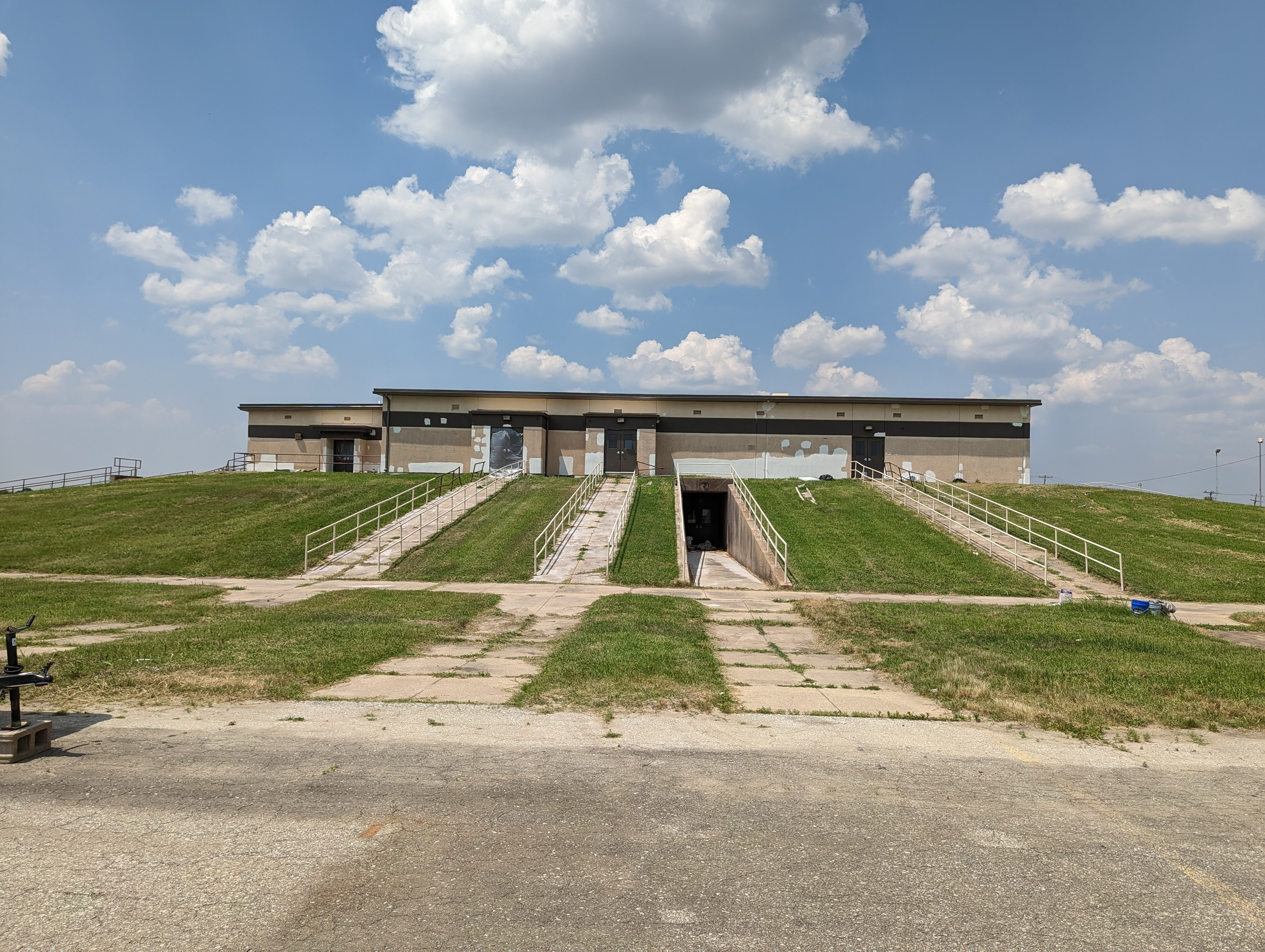
- Building 1225, the Readiness Crew Building of the base's SAC alert facility. It is currently being restored to become a museum exhibit.

- Location within Arkansas Location within the United States
- Location: 4701 Memorial Drive, Blytheville, Arkansas
- Coordinates: 35°57′33″N 89°57′47″W
- Area: 247 acres (100 ha)
- NRHP reference No.: 100001999
- Added to NRHP: 26 January 2018

The facility houses two historic districts, the Blytheville Air Force Base Strategic Air Command (SAC) Alert and Weapons Storage Areas Historic District and the Blytheville Air Force Base Capehart Housing Historic District. Both were listed on the National Register of Historic Places in 2018.

The SAC Alert Facility is a 247 acres (100 ha) historic district which included 23 contributing buildings, 33 contributing structures, two contributing sites, a contributing object, as well as two non-contributing buildings. The facility was originally constructed in 1960 after the Strategic Air Command took over the base.

In April 2022, the National Cold War Center began working to restore the facility as its primary exhibit.

== Patch and Emblem Gallery ==
Emblems for Commands and Units assigned to and overseeing Blytheville Air Force Base

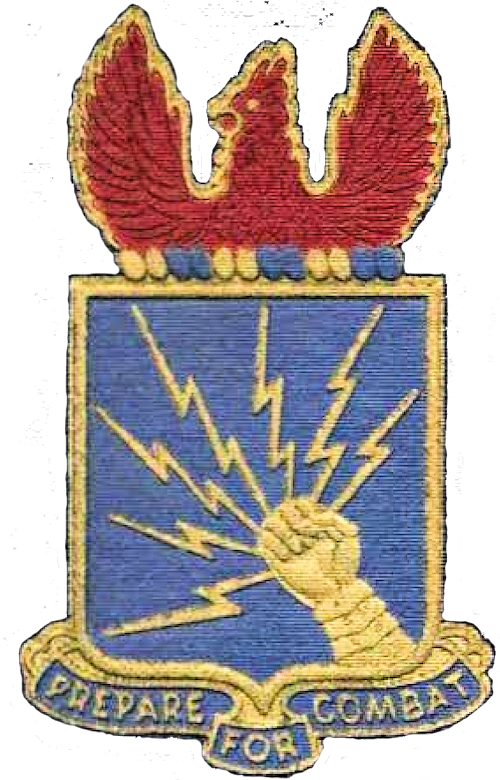
Army Air Forces Eastern Flying Training Command emblem

Tactical Air Command emblem

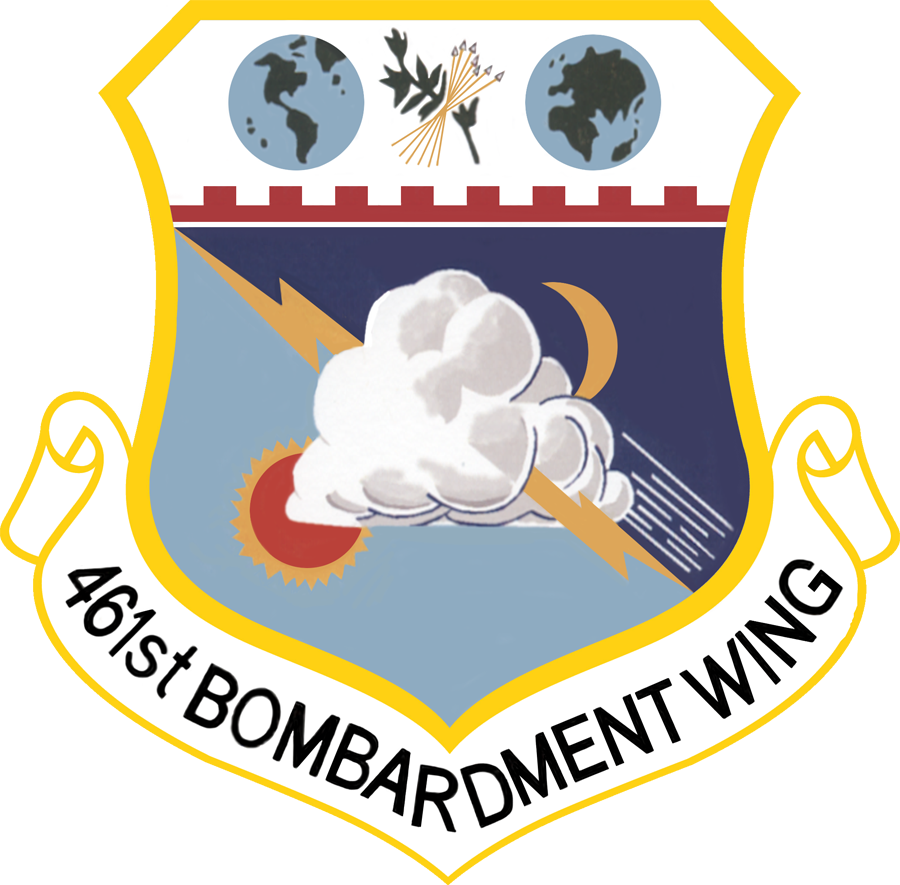
461st Bombardment Wing, Tactical emblem

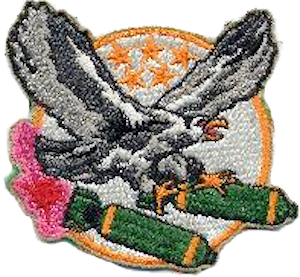
764th Bombardment Squadron, Tactical patch

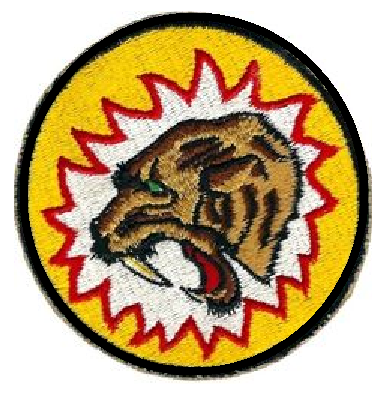
765th Bombardment Squadron, Tactical patch

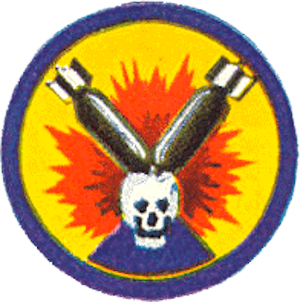
766th Bombardment Squadron, Tactical patch

Strategic Air Command Emblem

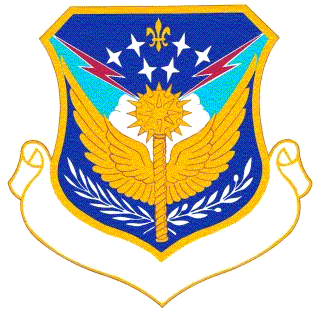
42nd Air Division emblem

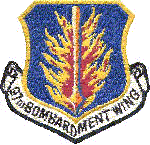
97th Bombardment Wing, Heavy Patch

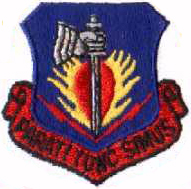
340th Bombardment Squadron, Heavy patch

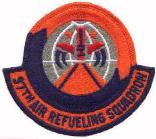
97th Air Refueling Squadron, Heavy patch

== Major commands to which assigned ==
- Army Air Force Flying Training Command, 10 June 1942 – 16 June 1945
- Continental Air Forces, 16 June 1945 – 21 March 1946
  - Redesignated to Strategic Air Command, 21 March 1946 – 1 April 1946
- Tactical Air Command, 1 April 1946 – 15 August 1946, 10 June 1953 – 1 October 1953
- Air Materiel Command, 1 October 1953 – 1 July 1954
- Tactical Air Command, 1 July 1954 – 1 April 1958
- Strategic Air Command, 1 April 1958 – 1 June 1992
- Air Combat Command, 1 June 1992 – 15 December 1992 (not operational)

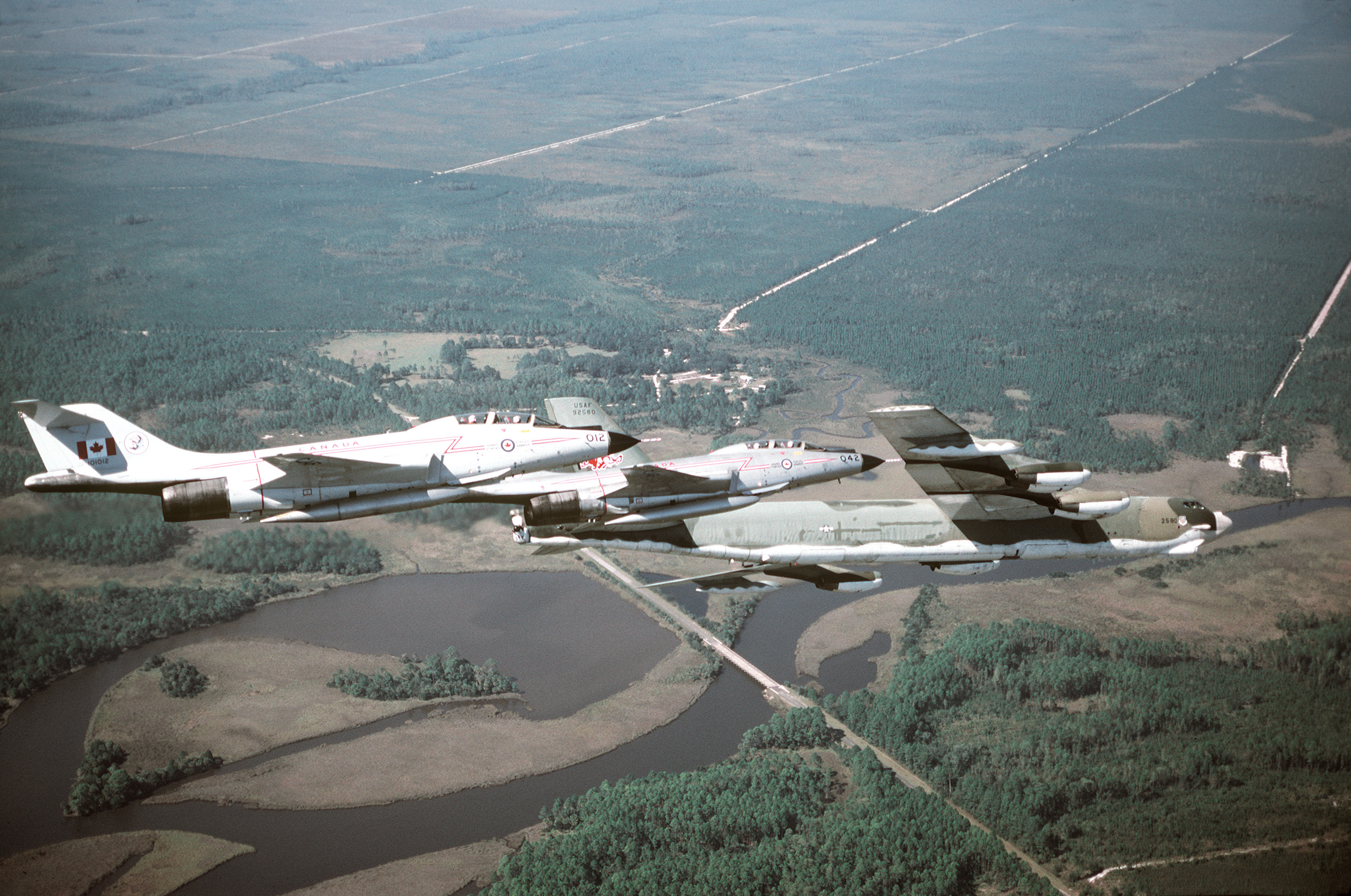
97th Wing B-52 2580 "Miss Piggy" flying in formation with Canadian F-101Bs

== Major units assigned ==
- 326th Army Air Forces Base Unit, July 21, 1942 - April 30, 1944
- 25th Twin Engine Flying Training Group, 25 July 1942 – 29 February 1944
  - 698th Two-Engine Flying Training Squadron
  - 699th Two-Engine Flying Training Squadron
  - 700th Two-Engine Flying Training Squadron
  - 701st Two-Engine Flying Training Squadron
  - 702nd Two-Engine Flying Training Squadron
  - 703rd Two-Engine Flying Training Squadron
  - 704th Two-Engine Flying Training Squadron
- 945th Quartermaster Truck Platoon, October 2, 1942
- 309th Aviation Squadron, September 14, 1942 - April 30, 1944
- 2111th Army Air Force Base Unit, 1 May 1944 – 15 June 1945
- 809th Army Air Force Base Unit, 16 June 1945 – 31 March 1946
- 334th Army Air Force Base Unit, 1 April 1946 – 25 November 1946
- 387th Composite Squadron (Reserve), 25 April 1949 – 17 June 1949
- 4431st Air Base Squadron, 19 July 1955 – 16 October 1956
- 461st Bombardment Wing, Tactical, 17 October 1956 – 1 April 1958
  - 764th Bombardment Squadron
  - 765th Bombardment Squadron
  - 766th Bombardment Squadron
- 4229th Air Base Squadron, 1 April 1958 – 1 July 1959
- 97th Bombardment Wing, Heavy, 1 July 1959 – 1 September 1991; Redesignated: 97th Wing, 1 September 1991 – 1 April 1992
  - 340th Bombardment Squadron, Heavy
  - 914th Air Refueling Squadron, Heavy
  - 97th Air Refueling Squadron, Heavy

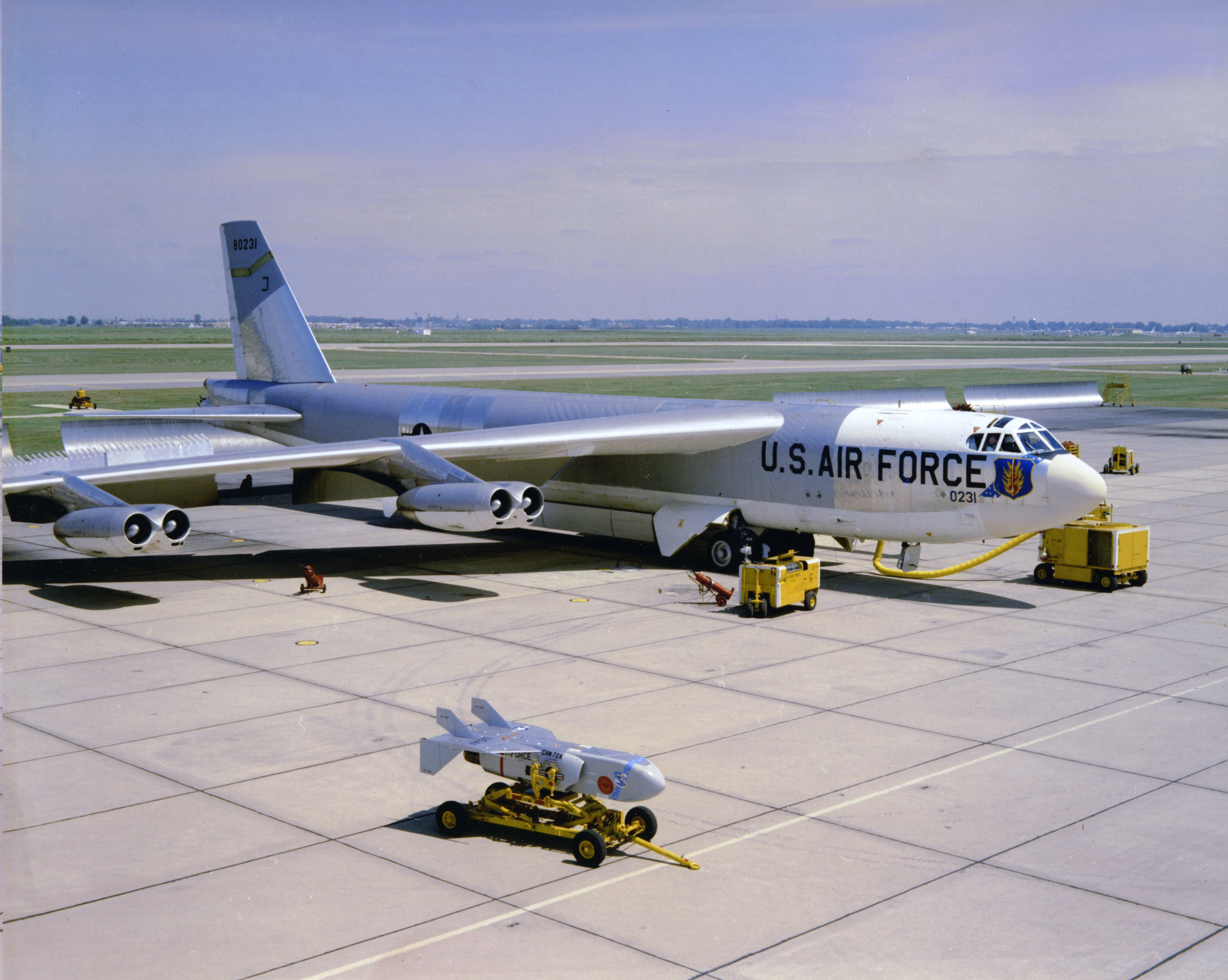
B-52G 58-0231 sitting on the apron at Blytheville Air Force Base. The base's Readiness Crew Building and Weapon Storage are in the far background.

== Major aircraft assigned ==
- Vultee BT-13 Valiant, 1942-1945
- North American AT-6B, 1942–1944
- Curtiss AT-9A, 1942–1944
- Beech AT-10B, 1942–1945
- Republic AT-12, 1942–1944
- North American TB-25G, 1945
- Curtiss C-46, 1945
- Douglas C-47, 1945; 1956-1971
- Waco CG-4, 1945
- Martin B-57 Canberra, 1956–1958
- Lockheed T-33, 1956-1961
- Boeing B-52G Stratofortress, 1960–1992
- Cessna T-37, 1960-1992
- Boeing KC-135A Stratotanker, 1961–1992

== See also ==
- Arkansas World War II Army Airfields
- 30th Flying Training Wing (World War II)
- Eaker site, a major archaeological site within the base's grounds
- Ira Eaker, WW2 Army Air Forces General
- Cuban Missile Crisis

== Bibliography ==
- Bruce-Henderson, S. et al. (no date) Operation Redwing. Available at: https://apps.dtic.mil/sti/citations/ADA134795 (Accessed: 24 November 2023).
- Hartley, Jillian (2018). "Eaker Air Force Base". Encyclopedia of Arkansas.
- Heard, Keneth (2018). "Arkansas Officials Seek Cold War Museum for Former Air Base". US News.
- U.S. Air Force Civil Engineer Center. "Community Relations Plan for the Former Eaker Air Force Base Blytheville, Arkansas (July 2007)" (PDF). AFCEC.mil.
