= BYH =

BYH may refer to:

- Arkansas International Airport, US, IATA code
- Bhujel language, ISO 639-3 code
- A Volkswagen-Audi V8 engine
