= KBYH =

KBYH may refer to:

- Arkansas International Airport (ICAO code KBYH)
- KBYH-LP, a low-power radio station (102.7 FM) licensed to serve Midland, Texas, United States
