= 30th Flying Training Wing =

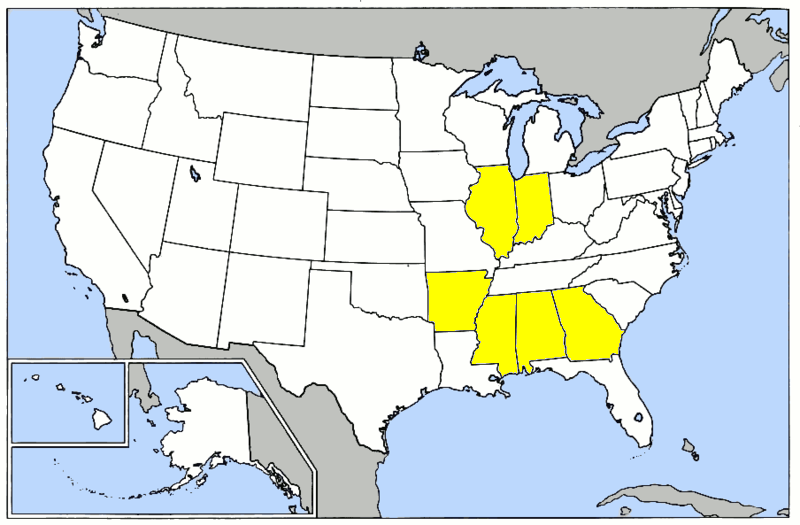
- Locations of airfields controlled by the 30th Flying Training Wing
- Active: 1942–1946
- Country: United States
- Branch: United States Army Air Forces
- Type: Command and Control
- Role: Training
- Part of: Eastern Flying Training Command
- Engagements: World War II: World War II American Theater

The 30th Flying Training Wing was a training wing of the United States Army Air Forces. This wing oversaw multiple "advanced" flight schools that trained multi-engine bomber pilots for World War 2. It was last assigned to the Flying Division, Air Training Command, and was disbanded on 13 October 1946 at Randolph Field, Texas.

== History ==
The wing was a World War II command and control organization which supported Training Command flight schools in the Lower Great Lakes and Southeastern United States. The assigned schools provided phase III advanced two-engine flying training for air cadets, along with advanced B-24 Invader and B-25 Mitchell transition training for experienced pilots for reassignment to other flying units. Single-engine transition training was also instructed. Air cadet graduates of the advanced schools were commissioned as second lieutenants, received their Aircrew Badge ("wings") and were reassigned to operational or replacement training units operated by one of the four numbered air fores in the zone of interior.

As training requirements changed during the war, schools were activated and inactivated or transferred to meet those requirements.

=== Lineage ===
- Established as 30th Flying Training Wing on 17 December 1942

Activated on 26 December 1942
Disbanded on 13 October 1946.

=== Assignments ===
- Army Air Forces Southeast Training Center, 26 December 1942
- Army Air Forces Eastern Flying Training Command, 15 September 1943
- Army Air Forces Western Flying Training Command, 15 December 1945
- Army Air Forces Flying Training Command, 1 January 1946
- Flying Division, Air Training Command, 1 July-13 October 1946.

=== Training aircraft ===
The two-engine advanced flying schools flew several trainers, designed for different tactical aircraft

- Cessna AT-17 Bobcat (Also known as AT-8) - used for transport pilot training
- Curtiss-Wright AT-9 Jeep - used to simulate P-38 Lightning two-engine fighters, notoriously difficult to fly or land
- Beechcraft AT-10 Wichita - used for bomber pilot training
- North American AT-6 Texan

=== Assigned pilot schools ===
Blytheville Army Airfield, Blytheville, Arkansas
AAF Pilot School (Advanced Two Engine):
25th Two-Engine Flying Training Group:
Opened: July 1942, Closed: November 1945 (AT-10, AT-17)
Later became USAF Blytheville (Eaker) Air Force Base in 1954, Closed 1992

Columbus Army Airfield, Columbus, Mississippi
AAF Pilot School (Advanced Two Engine):
26th Two-Engine Flying Training Group
Opened: March 1942, Closed: August 1945 (AT-8, AT-9, AT-10, AT-17)
Now USAF Columbus Air Force Base

Freeman Army Airfield, Seymour, Indiana
AAF Pilot School (Advanced Two Engine):
33d Two-Engine Flying Training Group
Opened: June 1943, Closed: February 1945 (AT-10)

George Army Airfield, Lawrenceville, Illinois
AAF Pilot School (Advanced Two Engine):
30th Two-Engine Flying Training Group
Opened: September 1942, Closed: July 1944 (AT-9, AT-10)
Transferred to I Troop Carrier Command, September 1944

Moody Army Airfield, Valdosta, Georgia
AAF Pilot School (Advanced Two Engine):
31st Two-Engine Flying Training Group
Opened: January 1942, Closed: September 1944 (AT-9, AT-10, AT-17)
Became Transition School for B-25s, A-26s, September 1944; Now USAF Moody Air Force Base

Stuttgart Army Airfield, Stuttgart, Arkansas
AAF Pilot School (Advanced Two Engine):
32nd Two-Engine Flying Training Group
Opened: May 1943, Closed: September 1944 (AT-10)
Field opened September 1942, used for Glider training until April 1943; became single-engine P-40, P-41 transition school September 1944, Closed December 1945

Turner Army Airfield, Albany, Georgia
AAF Pilot School (Advanced Two Engine):
23d Two-Engine Flying Training Group
Opened: July 1941, Closed: September 1944 (AT-7, AT-9, AT-10, AT-17)
Became B-25 Mitchell transition school, September 1944; later Turner Air Force Base, Closed 1967

=== Stations ===
- Jackson Army Airbase, Jackson, Mississippi, 26 December 1942
- Columbus Army Airfield, Columbus, Mississippi, 15 September 1943
- Turner Army Airfield, Georgia, 13 September 1944
- Randolph Field, Universal City, Texas, 31 Jul – 13 Oct 1946.

== See also ==
- Army Air Forces Training Command
- Other Eastern Flying Training Command Flight Training Wings:

27th Flying Training Wing (World War II) Basic Flight Training
28th Flying Training Wing (World War II) Advanced Flight Training, Single Engine
29th Flying Training Wing (World War II) Primary Flight Training
74th Flying Training Wing (World War II) Classification/Preflight/Specialized/Navigation
75th Flying Training Wing (World War II) Gunnery
76th Flying Training Wing (World War II) Specialized Four-Engine Training
