= KMXA =

KMXA may refer to:

- The ICAO airport code for Manila Municipal Airport in Arkansas, United States
- KMXA (AM), a radio station (1090 AM) licensed to Aurora, Colorado, United States
- KMXA-FM, a radio station (99.9 FM) licensed to Minot, North Dakota, United States
