= Manila Airport (disambiguation) =

Manila Airport commonly refers to Ninoy Aquino International Airport, an airport serving the Greater Manila Area in the Philippines.

Manila Airport may also refer to:

- Manila Municipal Airport, an airport in Arkansas, US
- Sangley Point Airport, an airport in Cavite that also serves Metro Manila, Philippines
- New Manila International Airport, an under-construction airport in Bulacan, Philippines
