= Arkansas International Airport =

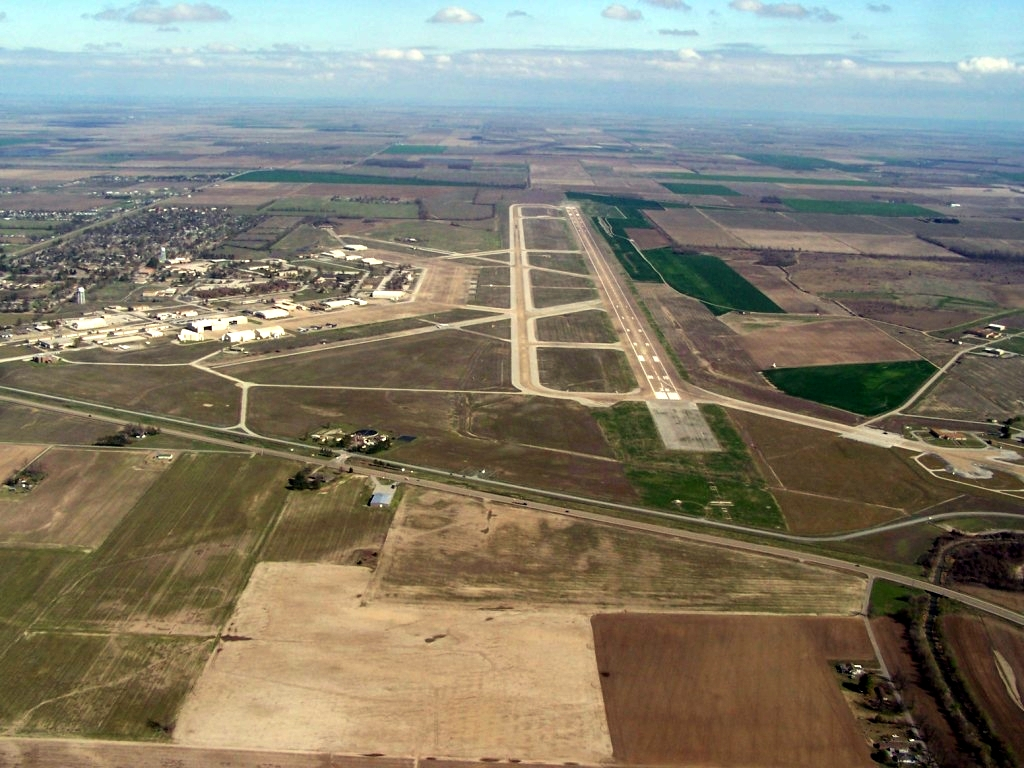
- IATA: BYH; ICAO: KBYH; FAA LID: BYH

Summary
- Airport type: Public
- Owner: Blytheville Gosnell Regional Airport Authority
- Serves: Blytheville, Arkansas
- Opened: October 7, 1946-June 11, 1953; February 1998- Present
- Time zone: Central ({{{utc}}})
- Elevation AMSL: 254 ft (77 m)
- Coordinates: 35°57′52″N 089°56′38″W
- Interactive map of Arkansas International Airport

Runways
Direction	Length		Surface
Direction	ft	m	Surface
18/36	11,602	3,536	Concrete

Statistics (2021)
- Aircraft operations (year ending 9/30/2021): 16,000
- Based aircraft: 29
- Source: Federal Aviation Administration

Arkansas International Airport (IATA: BYH, ICAO: KBYH, FAA LID: BYH) is a public use airport located three nautical miles (6 km) northwest of the central business district of Blytheville, a city in Mississippi County, Arkansas, United States. It is owned by the Blytheville Gosnell Regional Airport Authority.

== History ==
=== Blytheville Army Airfield ===
In 1942, in response to a pilot shortage going into World War 2, the U.S. Army Air Force constructed a B-25 advanced pilot training school northwest of the city of Blytheville. The facility was a standard Class "A" runway, with a large apron. The cadets trained on the BT-13, AT-6, AT-9, and AT-10, and it is believed there were over 3000 graduates from the flight school.

=== Blytheville Municipal Airport ===
On October 7, 1946, the Army released control of the facility to the city of Blytheville. The city operated the base as the Blytheville Municipal Airport, with most of the dorms converted to serve as a veterans housing area, and industrial park.

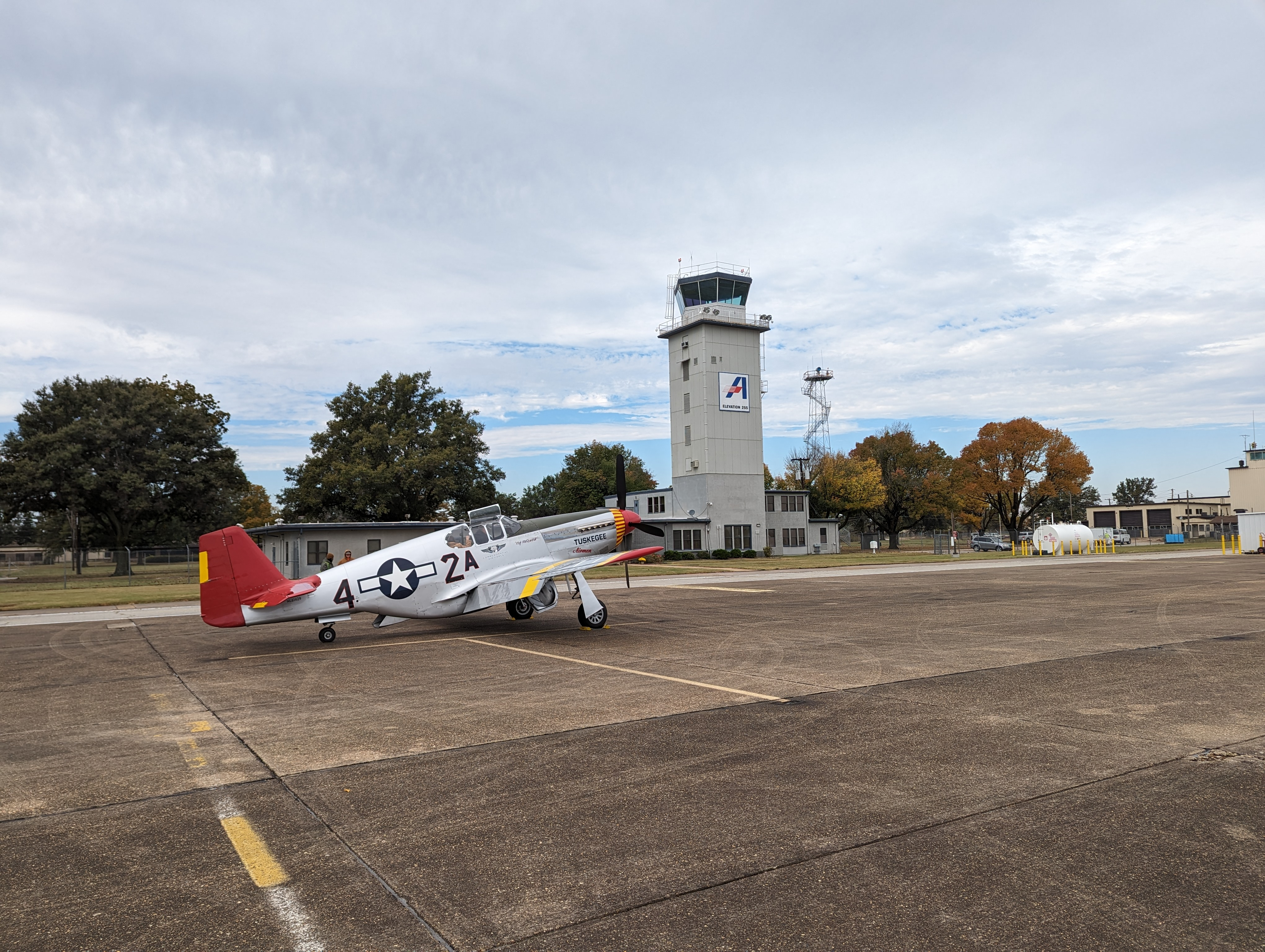
Building 201: Control Tower and FBO

A new administration building was constructed on the site of the WW2 era control tower in 1950, at a cost of $50k, with half of the funding provided by the federal government. The city of Blytheville applied to the Civil Aeronautics Authority multiple times to make the airport a stop on the Chicago and Southern Air Lines main route. But the petitions were never acknowledged.

=== Blytheville Air Force Base ===
As early as 1946, the Blytheville Chamber of Commerce began lobbying efforts with Rep. Ezekiel Gathing to reopen the facility as a permanent military installation. In 1955, the facility was formally reopened the Tactical Air Command as Blytheville Air Force Base. The base hosted three squadrons of B-57s, which participated in multiple combat exercises, like Operation Redwing.

In 1959, the facility was transferred to the Strategic Air Command, as part of a project to expand the B-52 fleet. The base had a Ready Alert Facility constructed in 1960, which allowed B-52s to be launched at a moment's notice in case of nuclear war. In 1962, during the height of the Cuban Missile Crisis, two B-52G bombers at the base were readied to participate in Operation Chrome Dome to strike the Soviet Union with nuclear weapons if necessary.

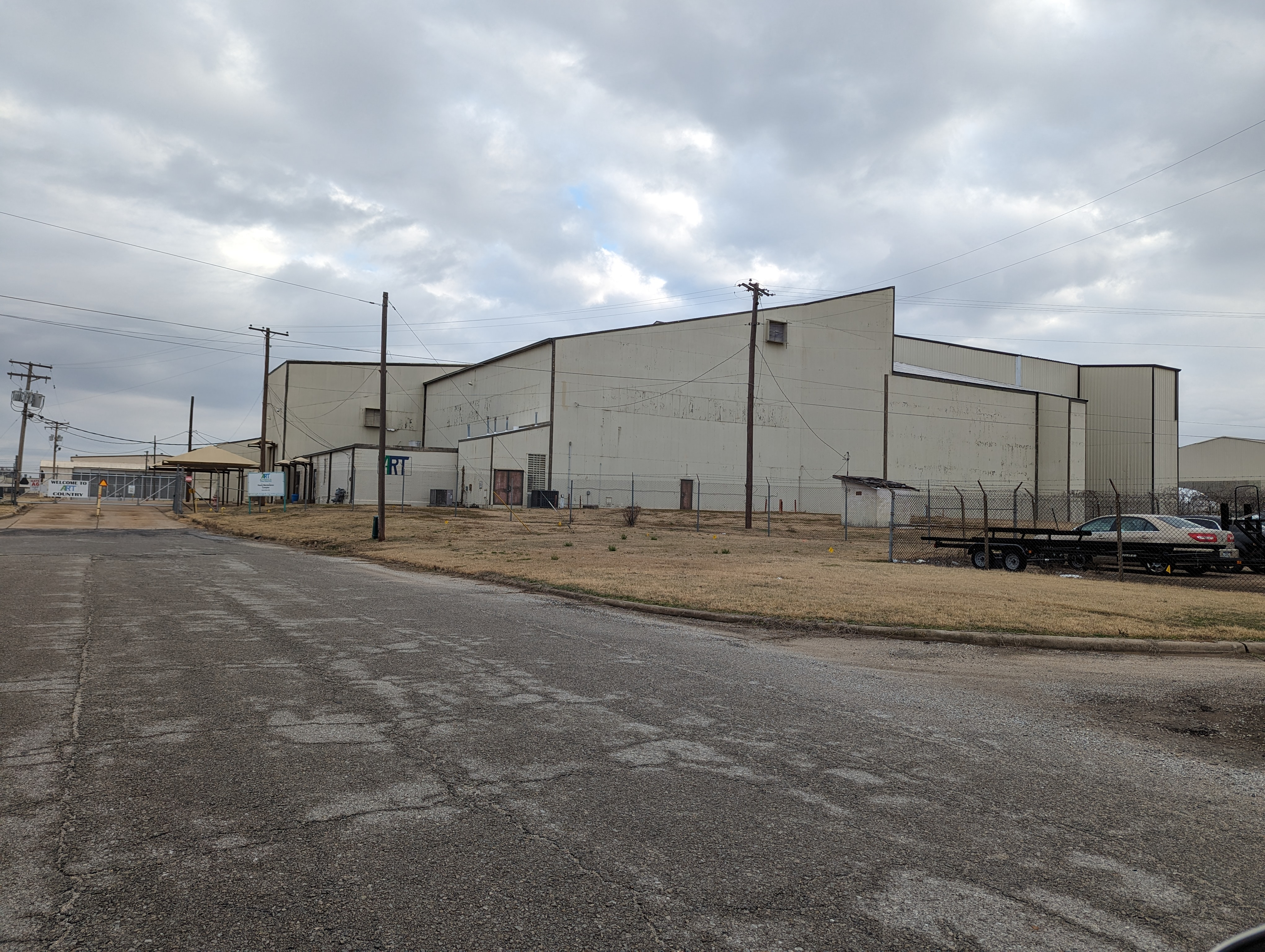
Hangar 455: originally constructed for B-52s, is now used by ART to repair commercial jets

The base was closed in December 1992 as part of the 1991 BRAC Commission.

=== Arkansas International Airport ===
Arkansas International Airport was developed after the base was closed and the land was transferred from the federal government to the cities of Blytheville and Gosnell for joint control.

In October 2008, Aviation Repair Technologies (ART) established its headquarters at the facility and opened repair facilities for aircraft heavy maintenance, short-term aircraft storage, and aircraft engine disassembly.

- The company's heavy maintenance activities are focused on regional turboprop and jet aircraft, including the ATR 72, ATR 42, CRJ 200, CRJ 700, CRJ 900, Embraer 120, ERJ 135, ERJ 145, ERJ 170, and ERJ 190 aircraft.
- Its aircraft engine disassembly operation, named Turbine Support International (TSI), is a joint venture between ART and Air France-KLM. TSI is focused on disassembly of CFM56, CF6-80, and CF6-50 engine types.
- Also located at the airport is an aircraft jet engine test cell that was constructed in 1991 by the US Air Force and is capable of testing engines that produce up to 56,000 lbs of thrust, including CFM56, CF34, and other popular engine types. Aviation Repair Technologies holds an exclusive lease on the test cell through 2019.
- From its headquarters at the facility, ART also manages a network of thirteen line maintenance facilities located at major airports around the United States.

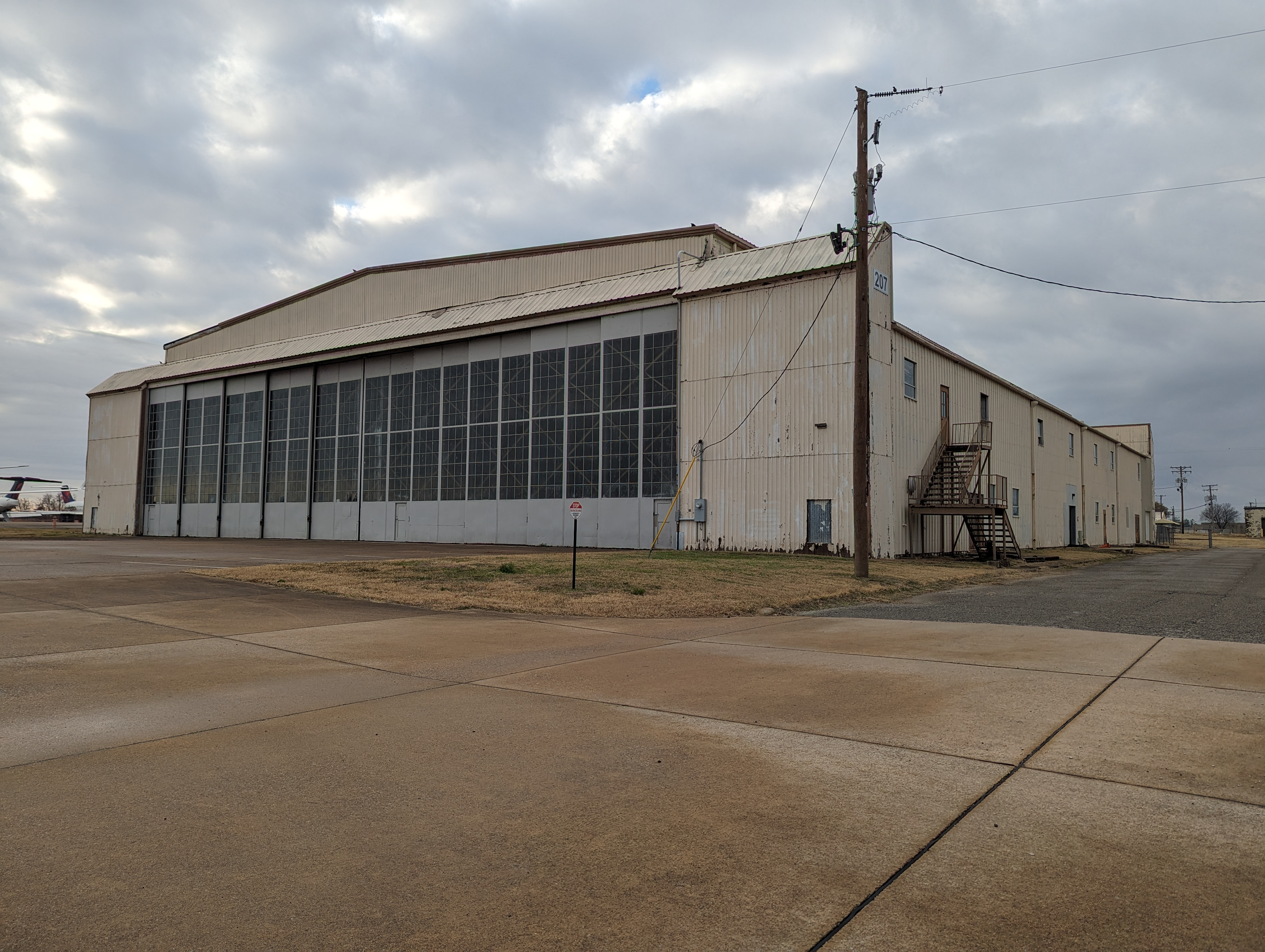
Hangar 207: used for aircraft storage and a venue to host events

The facility secured a lease with USA Floral, a major floral distributor based near Washington, D.C., that needed a southern locale for its regular flights to South America to import flowers. USA Floral was expected to create hundreds of jobs in Blytheville.

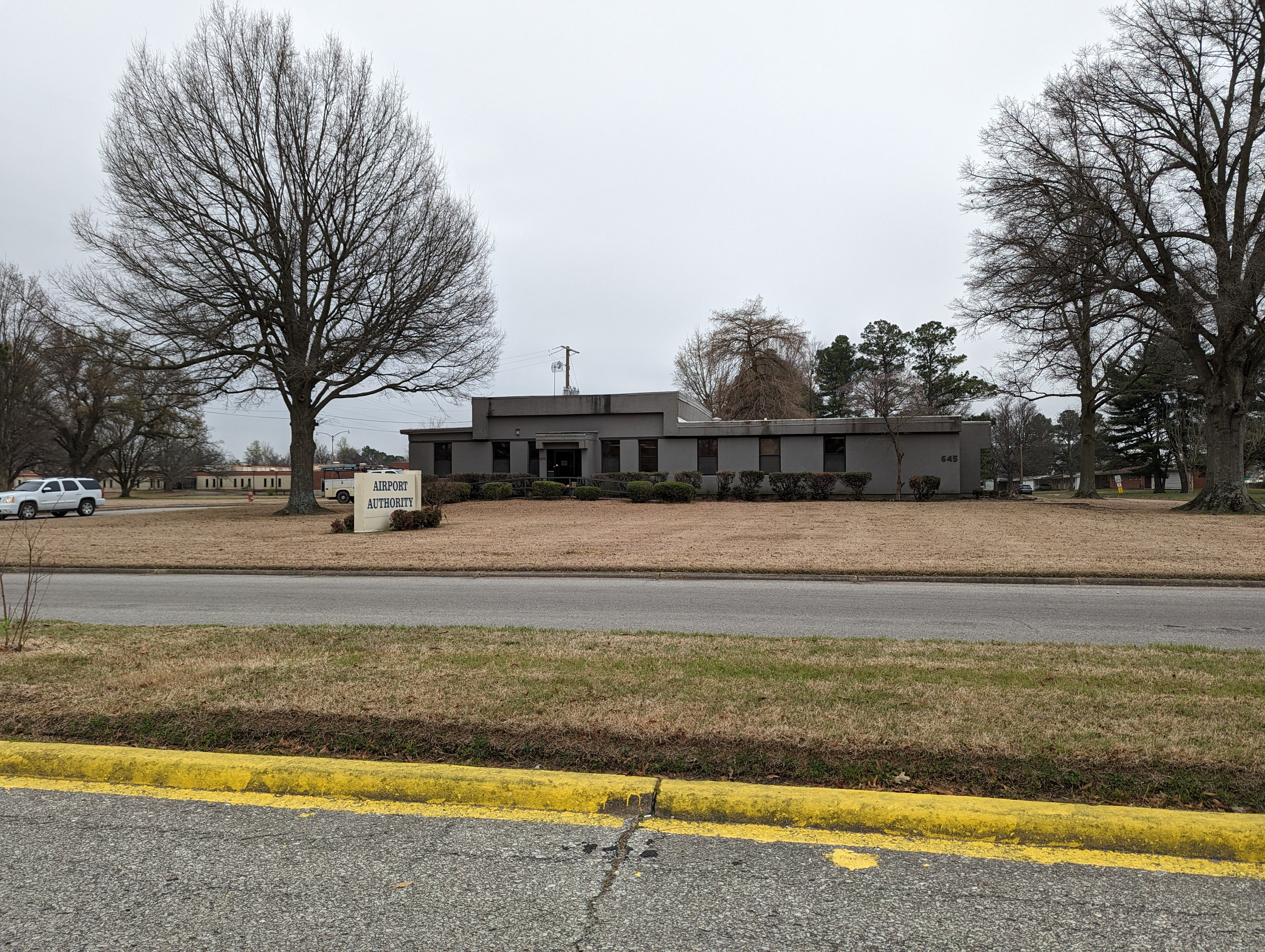
Building 645: Blytheville Gosnell Regional Airport Authority Office

The Arkansas Archaeological Society hosted a training program at the former air base from 2004 to 2006. Archaeologists have been studying the Mississippian culture that lived in the region, focusing on the years 900–1600.

In 2020, the National Cold War Center was created by local citizens to take the former base's SAC Alert Facility and turn it into a museum. They have a projected opening of 2027.

== Facilities and aircraft ==
Arkansas International Airport covers an area of 1,100 acres (450 ha) at an elevation of 254 feet (77 m) above mean sea level. It has one runway designated 18/36 with a concrete surface measuring 11,602 by 300 feet (3,536 x 92 m), with runway markings of 11,602 by 150 feet (3,536 x 46 m).

For the 12-month period ending September 30, 2021, the airport had 16,000 aircraft operations, an average of 44 per day: 68% general aviation and 31% military. At that time there were 29 aircraft based at this airport: 7 single-engine,1 multi-engine, and 21 jet.

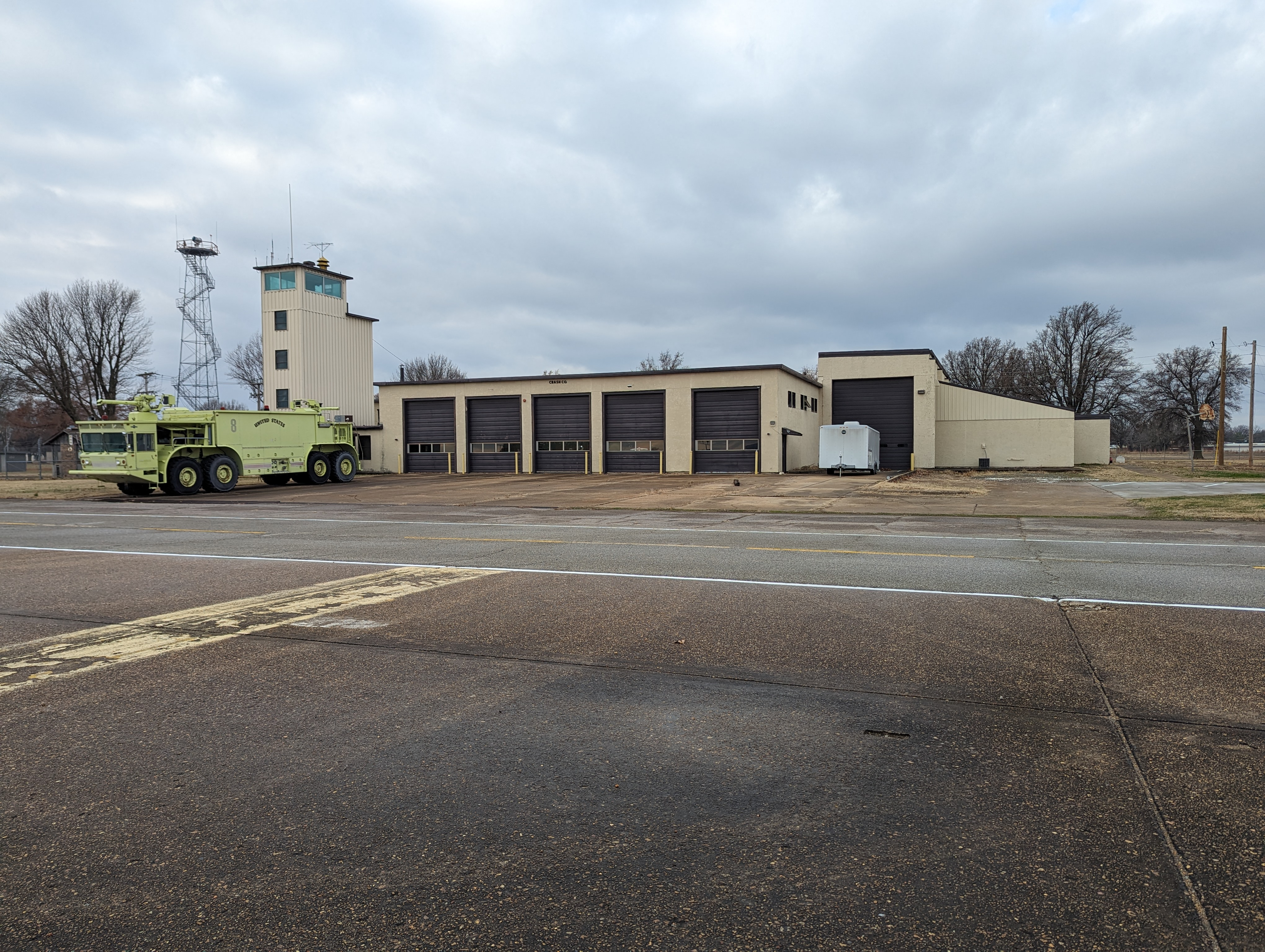
Building 100: BGRAA Fire Department

The facility has 1,500,000 square feet (140,000 m^{2}) of available space, which makes it the second largest industrial complex in Arkansas. The complex consists of commercial, community, recreation, educational, garage, industrial, office, residential, and warehousing facilities, which makes it very open for many uses. Because it was an Air Force base, it has room and facilities that are not available in many other complexes. This includes five million square feet of ramp space and six full size hangars large enough to accommodate a DC-10 or a Boeing 767. Facilities also include a full airplane maintenance and test hangar, with enough space to maintain the planes listed above. These buildings add up to approximately 300,000 square feet (28,000 m^{2}).

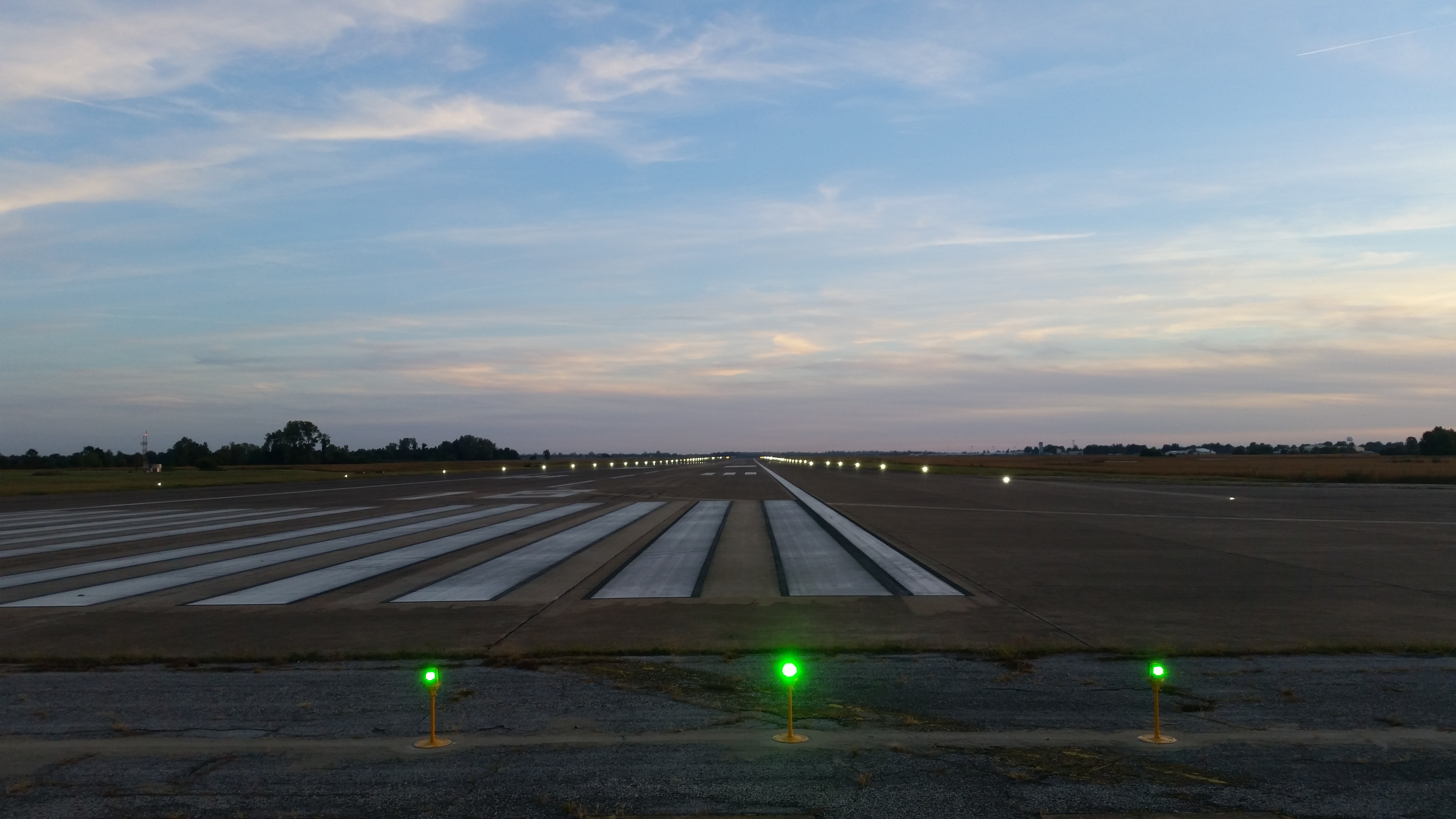
LED high intensity runway lights (the first in Arkansas)

The airport has the longest runway in the state of Arkansas at approximately 11,600 feet (3,500 m) in length. The airport also has very reasonable seasonal climate conditions, which makes it convenient for year-round travel. The airport can accommodate up to 50 aircraft, and has large hangar and storage areas for maintenance and repair needs.

The airport also accommodates deployment and pick-up of National Guard troops, as well as training grounds for military flight training maneuvers, primarily USAF C-130 training operations from Little Rock Air Force Base and Arkansas Army National Guard helicopter training operations from Camp Robinson. When the Arkansas Air National Guard operated Fairchild Republic A-10 Thunderbolt IIs, they were also able to use the airport.

On October 19, 2017, it became the first airport in the state to utilize LED high intensity runway lights (HIRLs).

== See also ==
- Arkansas World War II Army Airfields
- List of airports in Arkansas
