= Arkansas World War II Army Airfields =

Locations of WW2 Army Airfields in Arkansas

U.S. Army Air Forces airfields in Arkansas

Site information
- Type: Army airfields
- Owner: U.S. Army Air Forces
- Controlled by: Third Air Force; Training Command

Location
- Location of U.S. Army Air Forces airfields in Arkansas

Site history
- Built: 1940 – 1944
- Built by: Corps of Engineers
- In use: 1940 – present
- Battles/wars: World War II; American Theater

During World War II, the U.S. Army Air Forces (USAAF) established numerous airfields in Arkansas for training fighter and bomber pilots and aircrews.

Most of the airfields were under the command of Third Air Force or the Army Air Forces Training Command (USAAFTC). However the other USAAF support commands (Air Technical Service Command (ATSC); Air Transport Command (ATC) or Troop Carrier Command) commanded a significant number of airfields in a support roles.

It is still possible to find remnants of these wartime airfields. Many were converted into municipal airports, some were returned to agriculture and several were retained as United States Air Force installations and were front-line bases during the Cold War. Hundreds of the temporary buildings that were used survive today, and are being used for other purposes.

== Major Airfields ==
Army Air Force Training Command
Southeast Training Center/AAF Eastern Flying Training Command

- Blytheville Army Air Field, 3 miles north of Blytheville

Army Air Forces Advanced Flying School (Two Engine) / Army Air Forces Pilot School (Advanced, Two Engine); 3 May 1942-31 May 1945
326th Base Headquarters and Air Base Squadron; 21 July 1942-30 April 1944
2111th Army Air Forces Base Unit; 1 May 1944-16 June 1945
Became Blytheville Air Force Base / Eaker Air Force Base (1951-1992)
Now: Arkansas International Airport (IATA: BYH, ICAO: KBYH, FAA LID: BYH) (1992-Present)

- Newport Army Air Field, 6 miles northeast of Newport

Army Air Forces Basic Flying School/Army Air Forces Pilot School (Basic); 1 November 1942-30 April 1944
337th Base Headquarters and Air Base Squadron; 24 November 1942-30 April 1944
Later: Marine Corps Air Facility Newport
Now: Newport Municipal Airport (M19)

- Stuttgart Army Air Field, 5 miles north of Stuttgart

Army Air Forces Advanced Flying School (Two Engine)/Army Air Forces Pilot School (Advanced, Two Engine); 20 September 1942-7 February 1945
426th Base Headquarters and Air Base Squadron; 20 September 1942-30 April 1944
2141st Army Air Forces Base Unit (AAFEFTC); 1 May 1944-7 February 1945
314th Army Air Forces Base Unit (Third AF); 7 February 1945-8 December 1945
Now: Stuttgart Municipal Airport (SGT)

- Walnut Ridge Army Air Field, 4 miles north of Walnut Ridge

Army Air Forces Basic Flying School/Army Air Forces Pilot School (Basic); 15 August 1942-1 September 1944
323th Base Headquarters and Air Base Squadron; 25 August 1942-30 April 1944
Later: Marine Corps Air Facility Walnut Ridge
Now: Walnut Ridge Regional Airport (ARG)

- Adams Field, 4 miles east of Little Rock

(Joint use USAAF/Civil Airport)
12th Ferrying Service Detachment/12th Ferrying Service Station; 1 December 1943-31 March 1944
581st Army Air Forces Base Unit (12th Ferrying Service Station); 31 March 1944-20 September 1945
Now: Clinton National Airport (IATA: LIT, ICAO: KLIT, FAA LID: LIT)

- Grider Field, 5 miles east of Pine Bluff

Pine Bluff School of Aviation
312th Flying Training Detachment
Now: Pine Bluff Regional Airport (IATA: PBF, ICAO: KPBF, FAA LID: PBF)

== Known Secondary Facilities ==
- Carlisle (26 mi. NW Stuttgart)
- Cooter Auxiliary Field (10 mi. NE Blytheville)
- Erwin Auxiliary Army Airfield (near Newport)
- Hazen (19 mi. NNW Stuttgart)
- Hope Army Air Field (3 mi. NE Hope)
- Hornersville Auxiliary Field (16 mi. NW of Blytheville)
- Manila Auxiliary Field (13 mi. W Blytheville)
- Praireville (8 mi. SE Stuttgart)
- Steele Auxiliary Field (12 mi. N Blytheville)
- Ridge Army Air Base (4 mi. NE Walnut Ridge)
