= Erwin Auxiliary Army Airfield =

- U.S. National Register of Historic Places
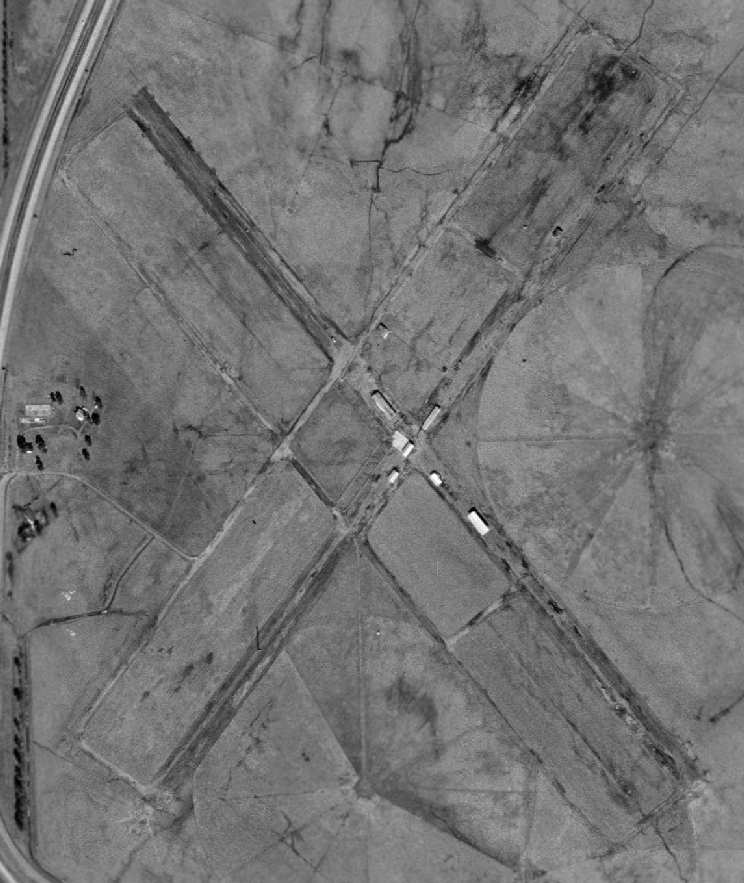
- 1994 aerial USGS photo of the airfield

- Location within Arkansas Location within the United States
- Nearest city: Newport, Arkansas
- Coordinates: 35°34′17″N 91°15′15″W
- Area: 430 acres (170 ha)
- Built: 1942
- MPS: World War II Home Front Efforts in Arkansas
- NRHP reference No.: 08000954
- Added to NRHP: October 2, 2008

The Erwin Auxiliary Army Airfield is a former World War II-era airfield near Newport, Arkansas, United States. The site, now in agricultural use, is located south of the city, northeast of the junction of Arkansas Highway 14 and United States Route 67. It had two runways, which formed an X shape. Each was 40–46 metres (131–151 ft) wide and 1,375 feet (419 m) long, with flanking taxiways. The airfield was built in 1942 as an auxiliary to the main Army Airfield at Newport (now Newport Municipal Airport), and was used for training and military exercises. It was briefly reactivated in 1946–49, but was definitively abandoned sometime before 1964.

The airfield site was listed on the National Register of Historic Places in 2008.

== See also ==
- Arkansas World War II Army Airfields
- National Register of Historic Places listings in Jackson County, Arkansas
