= Manila Municipal Airport =

Airport in Arkansas, United States

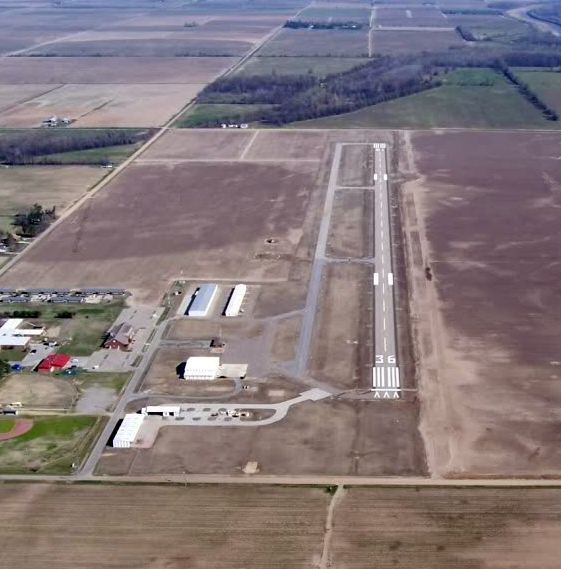
- IATA: MXA; ICAO: KMXA; FAA LID: MXA

Summary
- Airport type: Public
- Owner: City of Manila
- Serves: Manila, Arkansas
- Opened: August 1942
- Elevation AMSL: 242 ft (74 m)
- Coordinates: 35°53′40″N 090°09′16″W

Map
- Location of airport in Arkansas MXA (the United States)

Runways
Direction	Length		Surface
Direction	ft	m	Surface
18/36	4,200	1,280	Asphalt

Statistics (2010)
- Aircraft operations: 31,100
- Based aircraft: 13
- Source: Federal Aviation Administration

Manila Municipal Airport (IATA: MXA, ICAO: KMXA, FAA LID: MXA) is a public-use airport located two nautical miles (4 km) northeast of the central business district of Manila, in Mississippi County, Arkansas, United States. It is owned by the City of Manila.

This airport is included in the FAA's National Plan of Integrated Airport Systems for 2011–2015, which categorized it as a general aviation facility.

== History ==
The facility was originally constructed in 1942 to serve as an auxiliary field for the pilot training school at Blytheville Army Airfield in Blytheville, AR under the Eastern Flying Training Command and 30th Flying Training Wing. By August 1946, Blytheville AAF and its auxiliary sites were declared surplus property by the War Assets Administration. The Manila field was initially leased to local Gene Fleeman to use as a grazing pasture and flight school.

== Facilities and aircraft ==
Manila Municipal Airport covers an area of 630 acres (255 ha) at an elevation of 242 feet (74 m) above mean sea level. It has one runway designated 18/36 with an asphalt surface measuring 4,200 by 60 feet (1,280 x 18 m).

For the 12-month period ending July 31, 2010, the airport had 31,100 aircraft operations, an average of 85 per day: 99.7% general aviation and 0.3% military. At that time there were 13 aircraft based at this airport: 93% single-engine and 0% multi-engine.

== See also ==
- List of airports in Arkansas

== See also ==
Arkansas World War II Army Airfields
