= Stuttgart Municipal Airport =

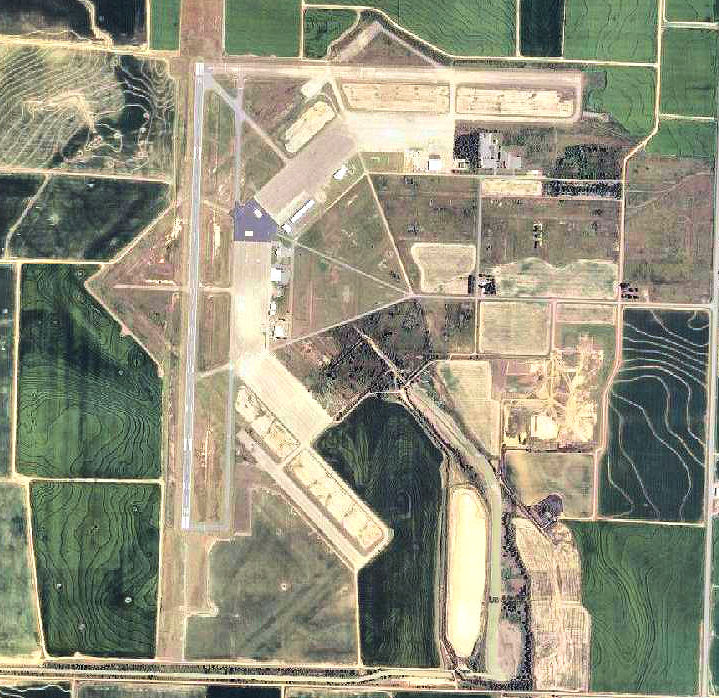
- 2006 USGS image
- IATA: SGT; ICAO: KSGT; FAA LID: SGT

Summary
- Airport type: Public
- Owner: City of Stuttgart
- Serves: Stuttgart, Arkansas
- Location: Roc Roe Township, Prairie County
- Elevation AMSL: 224 ft / 68 m
- Coordinates: 34°35′58″N 091°34′30″W

Map
- Location of airport in Arkansas KSGT (the United States)

Runways
Direction	Length		Surface
Direction	ft	m	Surface
9/27	5,002	1,525	Concrete
18/36	6,015	1,833	Asphalt

Statistics (2021)
- Aircraft operations: 60,700
- Based aircraft: 22
- Source: Federal Aviation Administration

for the airport's World War II history, see Stuttgart Army Airfield

Stuttgart Municipal Airport (IATA: SGT, ICAO: KSGT, FAA LID: SGT) is in Prairie County, Arkansas. It is eight miles north of Stuttgart, which owns the airport and is the county seat of Arkansas County's northern district. The FAA's National Plan of Integrated Airport Systems for 2009–2013 categorized it as a general aviation facility.

== History ==
Stuttgart Municipal Airport dates to 1942 when it was built by the United States Army Air Forces. It was used as an advanced twin-engine flying school and glider training. With the end of World War II, Stuttgart Army Airfield was declared excess and closed on 5 August 1946. It was conveyed though the War Assets Administration (WAA) to the City of Stuttgart to establish a municipal airport.

Trans-Texas DC-3s stopped at Stuttgart from 1953 to 1958–59.

== Facilities ==
Stuttgart Municipal Airport covers 2,560 acres (1,040 ha) at an elevation of 224 feet (68 m). It has two runways: 9/27 is 5,002 by 150 feet (1,525 x 46 m) concrete; 18/36 is 6,015 by 100 feet (1,833 x 30 m) asphalt.

In the year ending December 31, 2021, the airport had 60,700 aircraft operations, average 166 per day: 91% general aviation, 6% military, and 4% air taxi. 22 aircraft were then based at the airport: 17 single-engine, 2 multi-engine, 2 jet and 1 helicopter.

== Motorsports ==
A 3-mile (4.8 km) SCCA road course used the runways, with the first race in 1959. The last sports car race was in 1978. A drag strip, Stuttgart Dragway, existed from 1970 to 1972.

== See also ==
- Arkansas World War II Army Airfields
- List of airports in Arkansas
