= Army Air Forces Eastern Flying Training Command =

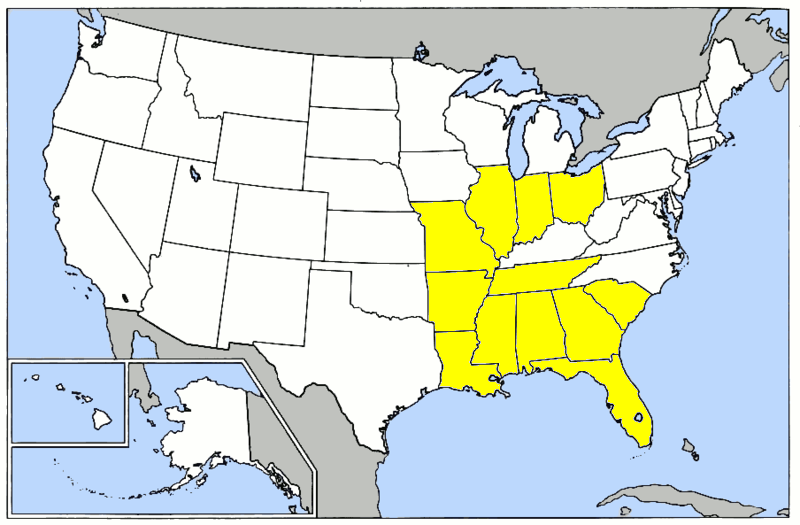
- Locations of airfields controlled by the AAF Eastern Flying Training Command
- Active: 1940–1945
- Country: United States
- Branch: United States Army Air Forces
- Type: Command and Control
- Role: Training
- Part of: Army Air Forces Training Command
- Engagements: World War II: World War II American Theater

Insignia
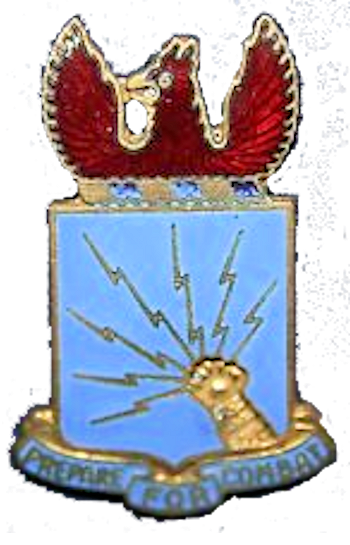
- Army Air Forces Eastern Flying Training Command distinctive unit insignia

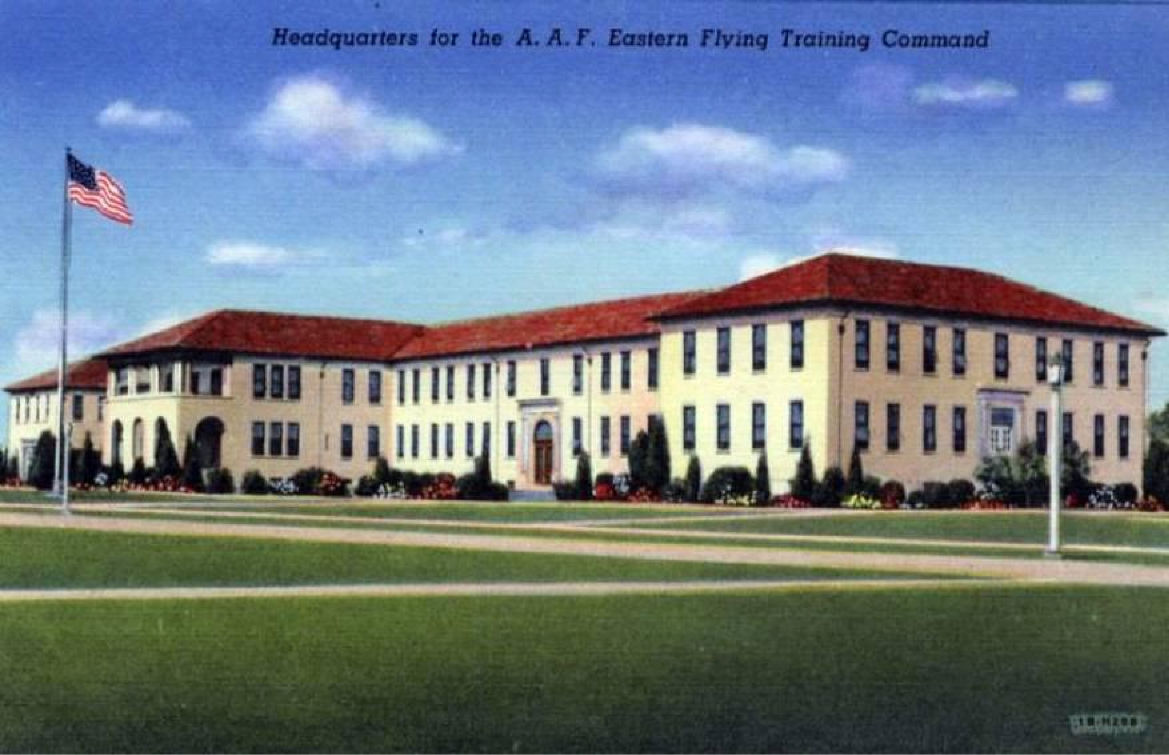
Postcard photo of the Headquarters, AAF Eastern Flying Training Command at Maxwell Field, Alabama

The Army Air Forces Eastern Flying Training Command (EFTC) was a unit of the United States Army Air Forces. It was assigned to the Army Air Forces Training Command, stationed at Maxwell Field, Alabama. It was inactivated on 15 December 1945.

== History ==
The command was established on 8 July 1940 by the Office of the Chief of Air Corps, as part of the expansion of the training department of the Air Corps. After the Fall of France in May 1940, the United States began rapidly expanding its military forces, and with the large numbers of men entering the military, the training requirements of the Air Corps were drastically expanded.

As a result, the centralized training of aircrew was divided into three Training Centers, the Eastern, Gulf Coast (later Central) and Western. Training schools were assigned to the Centers based on the geography of the United States. In July 1943, these Centers were re-designated as Eastern, Central and Western Training Commands.

By 1944, EFTC controlled a large number of training schools in the Southwestern United States, and established several Wings to provide organizational command and control over them, based on both training types and geography. The schools operated by EFTC part of the Aviation Cadet Training Program. These were:

- Classification: This was the stage where it would be decided whether the cadet would train as a navigator, bombardier, or pilot
- Preflight: Ground training for all air cadets. Successful completion meant being assigned to a flying school for training. "Washouts" were returned to the regular Air Corps ranks for reassignment.
- Primary (Phase I): Taught basic flying using two-seater training aircraft. Usually taught by contract flying schools operated by the WFTC
- Basic (Phase II): Formation flying, air navigation, cross-country flying skills were taught.
- Advanced (Phase II): Single or multi-engine aircraft schools for cadets becoming fighter, bomber or transport pilots. After graduation, the successful Air Cadet received his "wings" and were commissioned Second Lieutenants. In addition, experienced pilots in the field were sent to Training Command "transition schools" to acquire additional single or multi-engine flying ratings.

In addition to the American Air Cadets, Cadets from the British Royal Air Force and Free French Air Force were trained in flying skills. EFTC also operated aircrew schools for Navigators, Bombardiers and flexible aerial gunners. Radio operators were centrally trained at Scott Field, Illinois. Other aircrew positions, such as B-29 flight engineers and RADAR operators were also trained later in the war as training requirements presented themselves. This included the first jet pilots in 1945.

EFTC was inactivated on 15 December 1945, being consolidated into the new Central Flying Training Command at Randolph Field, Texas, as part of the consolidation of the Army Air Forces after World War II ended.

== Lineage ==
- Established as Southeast Air Corps Flying Training Center on 8 July 1940 and activated

Redesignated Army Air Forces Southeast Flying Training Center on 29 October 1942
Redesignated Army Air Forces Eastern Flying Training Command on 31 July 1943
Inactivated on 15 December 1945

=== Assignments ===
- Office of the Chief of Air Corps, 8 July 1940
- Air Corps Flying Training Command (later Army Air Forces Flying Training Command, Army Air Forces Training Command), 23 January 1942 – 15 December 1945

=== Stations ===
- Maxwell Field, Alabama, 8 July 1940 – 15 December 1945

=== Major Components ===
- 27th Flying Training Wing (World War II) Basic Flight Training

Headquarters:

Cochran Army Airfield, Georgia, 17 December 1942 – 15 December 1945
Randolph Field, Texas, 16 December 1945 – 16 June 1946

- 28th Flying Training Wing (World War II) Advanced Flight Training, Single-Engine

Headquarters:

George Army Airfield, Illinois, 26 December 1942
Craig Field, Alabama, 15 August 1943 – 30 December 1945

- 29th Flying Training Wing Primary Flight Training

Headquarters:

Moody Field, Georgia, 26 December 1942
Napier Field, Alabama, 1 April 1945 – 16 June 1946

- 30th Flying Training Wing (World War II) Advanced Flight Training, Two Engine

Headquarters:

Jackson Army Airbase, Mississippi, 26 December 1942
Columbus Army Air Field, Mississippi, 15 September 1943
Turner Army Airfield, Georgia, 13 September 1944
Randolph Field, Texas, 31 Jul – 13 Oct 1946.

- 74th Flying Training Wing (World War II) Classification/Preflight/Specialized/Navigation

Headquarters:

Maxwell Field, Alabama, 16 September 1943 – 30 December 1945

- 75th Flying Training Wing (World War II) Gunnery

Headquarters:

Buckingham Army Airfield, Florida, 25 August 1943 – 16 June 1946

- 76th Flying Training Wing (World War II) Specialized Four-Engine Training

Headquarters:

Smyrna Army Airfield, Tennessee, 25 August 1943 – 16 June 1946

== Major Aircraft ==
Primary flight training

Boeing-Stearman PT-17, Fairchild PT-19 and Ryan PT-22 twin-seat, single engine trainers

Basic flight training

Vultee BT-13 and Vultee BT-15

Advanced flight training

North American AT-6 (single engine); Cessna AT-17 (two-engine)

Specialized schools:

Curtiss-Wright AT-9s were used for high performance two-engine training in perpetration for Lockheed P-38 Lightning training
Beechcraft AT-10s were used for pilots in training for two engine bombers (B-25s and B-26s)
Beechcraft AT-11s were used for pilots in training for C-47 transports along with bombardier training
Beechcraft AT-7s were used for two-engine pilot training and also navigator training
Boeing B-17s and Consolidated B-24s were used for four-engine pilot training
L-2, L-3, L-4, TG-5 and TG-6s were used for glider and liaison pilot training
Gunnery training schools flew A-33, AT-6s, AT-1s, B-34s, B-10s and RP-63s for air-to-air flexible gunnery training.
