= Curtiss-Wright AT-9 Jeep =

American WWII twin-engine advanced trainer aircraft

AT-9 Jeep
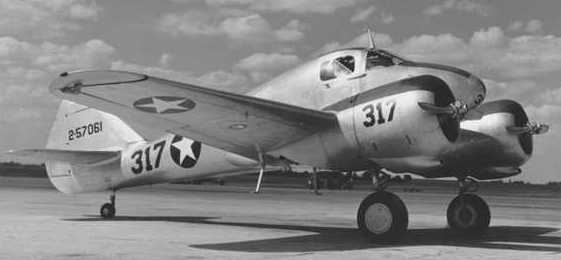
- AT-9A

General information
- Type: Advanced twin-engined trainer
- Manufacturer: Curtiss-Wright
- Primary users: United States Army Air Forces United States Air Force
- Number built: 792 (including prototype and AT-9A variant)

History
- Manufactured: 1941–1943
- First flight: 1941

The Curtiss-Wright AT-9 Jeep is a twin-engined advanced trainer aircraft designed and produced by the American aircraft manufacturer Curtiss-Wright.

Developed during the early 1940s with the support of the Bureau of Air Commerce as the CW-25, it was purpose-designed for use as a high-performance training aircraft with less stability and heavier flight controls to better represent twin-engined bomber aircraft. The AT-9 featured a low-wing cantilever monoplane configuration, retractable landing gear, and powered by a pair of Lycoming R-680-9 radial engines. The improved AT-9A variant was equipped with more powerful R-680-11 engines and better hydraulic systems.

The prototype, which lacked the stressed metal skin construction and all-metal airframes used on production aircraft, performed its maiden flight in 1941 and underwent evaluation that same year, promptly leading to the issuing of a production contract. In 1942, the AT-9 entered service with the United States Army Air Forces (USAAF) and was operated throughout World War II at various flight training schools, where it bridged the gap between single-engined trainers and twin-engined combat aircraft. The AT-9 was quickly withdrawn following the end of the conflict, only one fully-intact example has been preserved on static display at the National Museum of the United States Air Force.

== Development ==
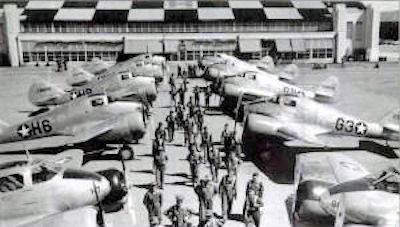
Lines of AT-9s at Randolph Field, Texas, 1944

By 1940, the US government was in the process of substantially expanding its armed forces in response to the increasingly likelihood that the country would be directly involved in World War II. In line with this wider programme, the United States Army Air Corps (USAAC) foresaw a need to expand its ability to train pilots for its combat aircraft and recognising that its traditional apporach of using obsolte bombers for training bomber crews, quickly explored the use of other aircraft for this mission. This effort would lead to both the Cessna AT-8 and the AT-9 Jeep being procured with considerable haste.

Curtiss-Wright had anticipated such a requirement for a "high-performance" aircraft and accordingly designed the Curtiss-Wright CW-25, a twin-engined trainer aircraft that possessed the takeoff and landing characteristics of a light bomber. It made use of the same basic design as the larger AT-17 Bobcat and drawing upon the aerodynamic design of the earlier Curtiss-Wright CW-22, the CW-25 was designed to simulate the demands of multi-engined operations. Specific performance stipulations of the military requirement included a relatively high wing loading (for the era) of 26 lbs per square foot, a fairly narrow track for the landing gear, and heavier flight controls, so that the aircraft would effectively emulate a twin-engine bomber for its trainees. Furthermore, the aircraft was purposely designed to be less stable and thus to be somewhat difficult to fly or land, which made it particularly suitable for teaching new pilots to cope with the demanding flight characteristics of a new generation of high-performance multi-engined aircraft, such as the Martin B-26 Marauder and Lockheed P-38 Lightning.

The design featured a compact airframe that was powered by a pair of Lycoming R-680-9 radial engines and furnished with a retractable tailwheel landing gear to achieve the performance necessary to meet the requirements of an advanced trainer. The single CW-25 prototype acquired for evaluation had a welded steel-tube fuselage structure while the wings, fuselage and tail unit were all fabric-covered. Subsiquent producition aircraft would feature a considerably different construction, using stressed metal skin construction and all-metal airframes instead. Development of the CW-25 was conducted under a contract issued by the Bureau of Air Commerce.

== Operational history ==
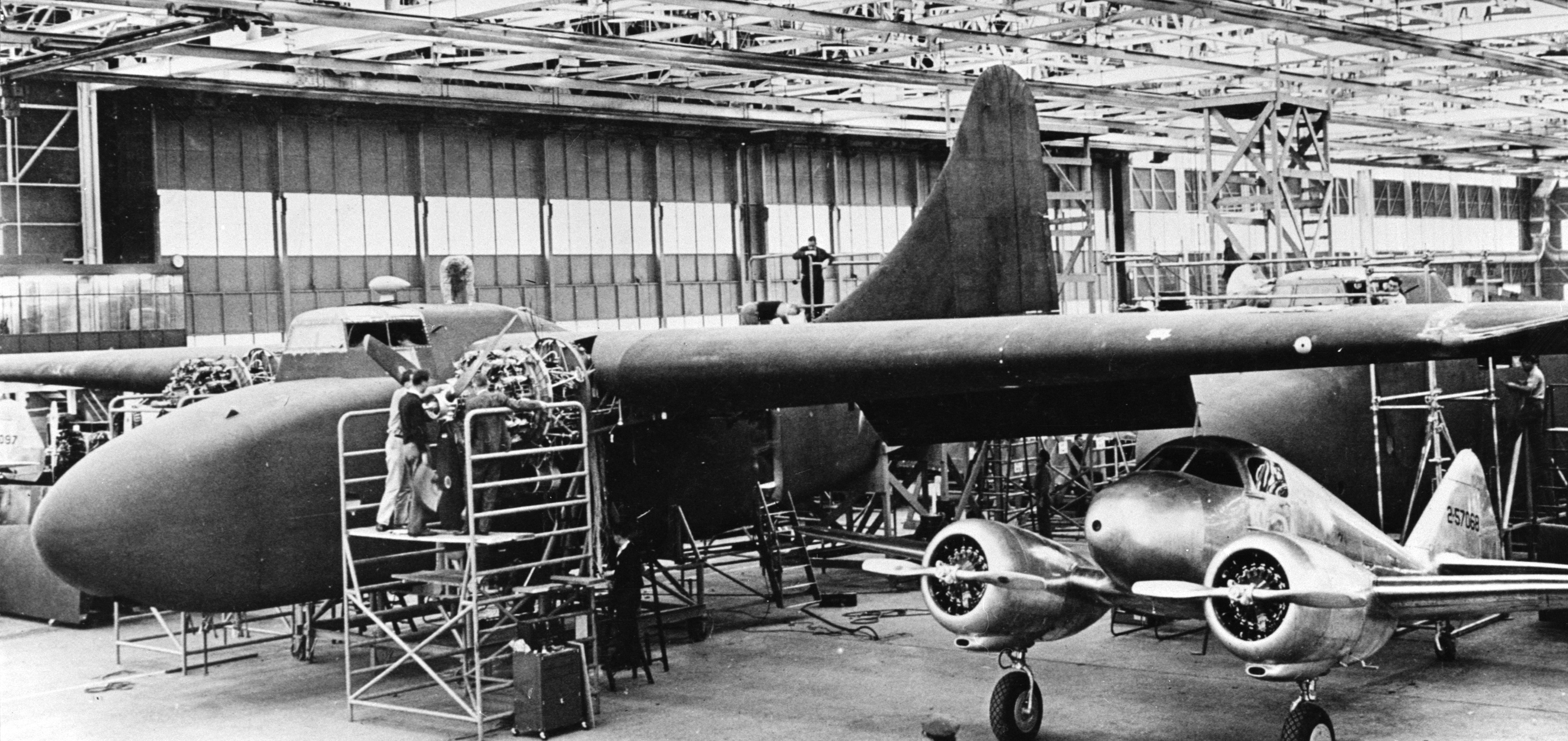
Curtiss AT-9A under C-76 Caravan's wing at Curtiss-Wright in 1943.

In 1941, the first prototype CW-25 underwent evaluation; while it was not deemed to by entirely satifactory, a production contract for 491 aircraft, designated AT-9, was issued to the company. The production version of the aricraft entered service as the AT-9 in 1942. Named the "Fledgling" by Curtiss-Wright, it commonly became known as the "Jeep" in the United States Army Air Forces (USAAF).

After construction of the full batch of 491 AT-9s was completed, production was terminated in favour of a separate run of the generally similar AT-9A, which differed primarily via its use of more powerful R-680-11 engines and revised hydraulic systems.

The AT-9 was operated through to the end of the conflict before being quickly withdrawn. On account of its difficult flying characteristics, the AT-9 was not offered for sale to civilians after the conflict. Many aircraft were promptly scrapped, although some non-flying examples were supplied to various schools for static training purposes.

== Variants ==
CW-25
Prototype with fabric covered fuselage and tail surfaces
AT-9
Production aircraft with stressed-skin covering and two Lycoming R-680-9 radial engines, 491 built.
AT-9A
AT-9 with Lycoming R-680-11 radial engines and revised hydraulic system, 300 built before production ended in February 1943.

== Operators ==
United States

- United States Army Air Forces
- United States Air Force

== Surviving aircraft ==
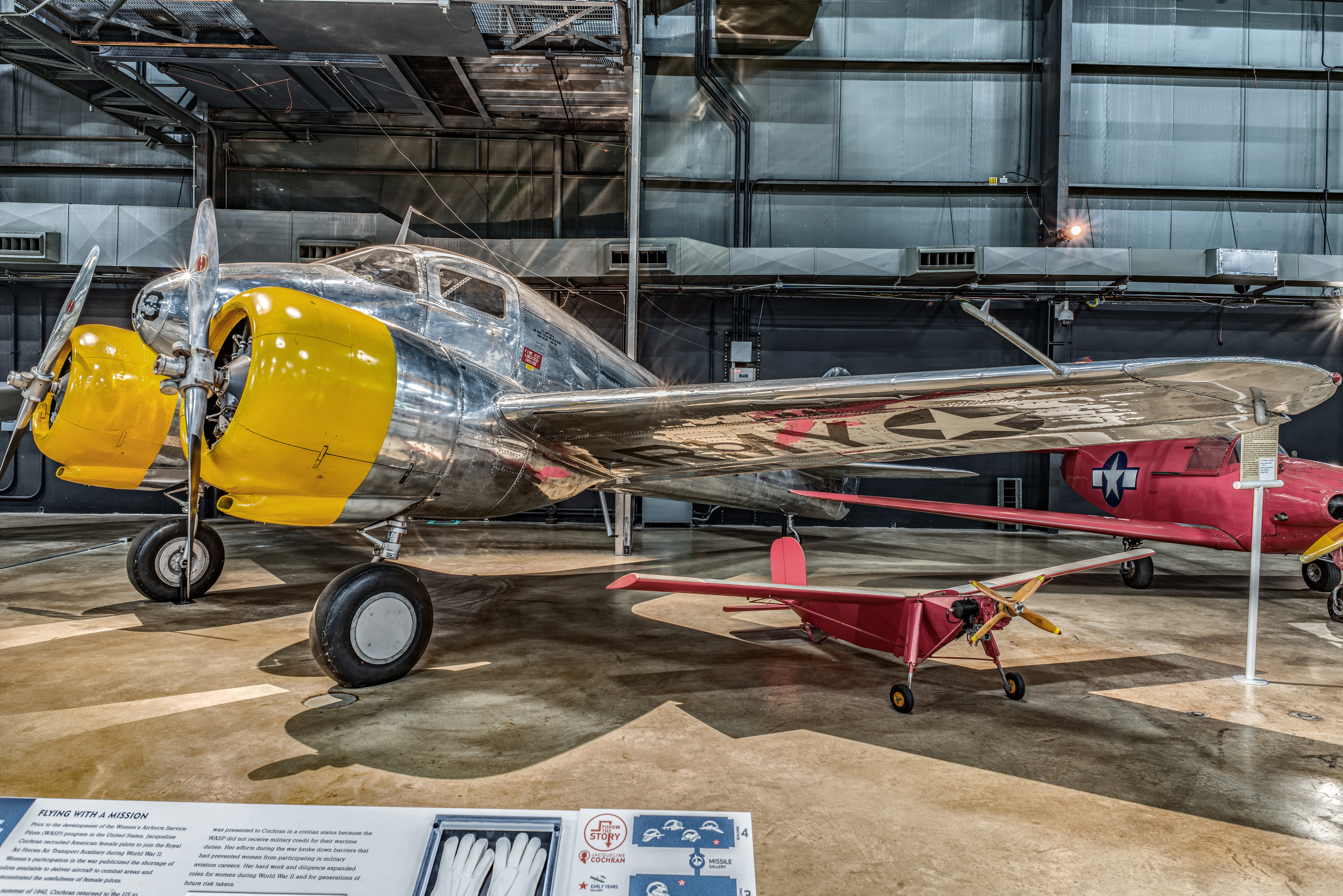
The Curtiss-Wright AT-9 "Jeep" bomber-pilot trainer at the National Museum of the USAF.

- 41-12150 – AT-9 on static display at the National Museum of the United States Air Force in Dayton, Ohio. It required extensive restoration, and was the product of the museum staff incorporating two incomplete airframes together, along with parts fabricated on site.
- 42-56882 – AT-9 in storage at the Pima Air & Space Museum in Tucson, Arizona. It was recovered from a crash site in 1993 and turned over to the museum for restoration. However, the aircraft is incomplete and will require a long and extensive restoration for display.

== Specifications (AT-9) ==
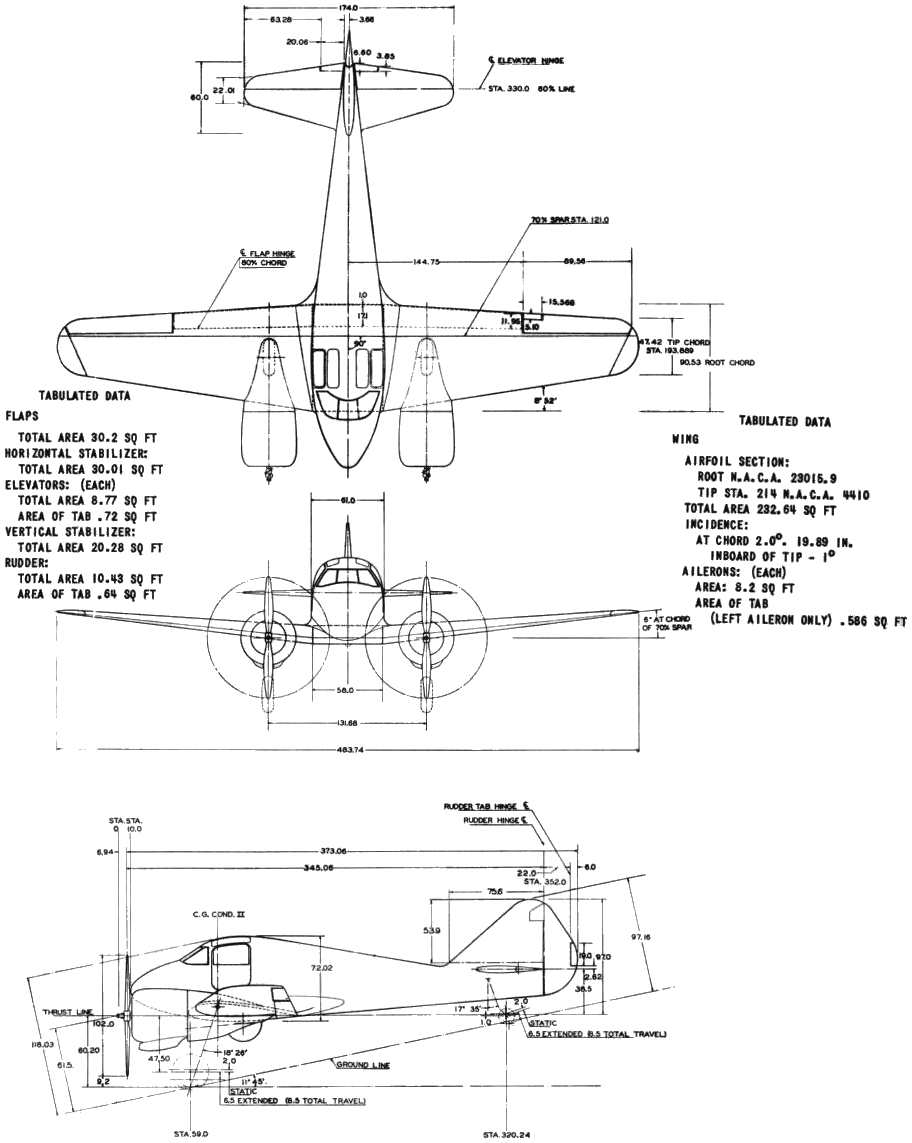
3-view line drawing of the Curtiss-Wright AT-9A

Data from Curtiss Aircraft 1907–1947, American Military Training Aircraft: Fixed and Rotary-Wing Trainers Since 1916

General characteristics

- Crew: 2
- Length: 31 ft 8 in (9.65 m)
- Wingspan: 40 ft 4 in (12.29 m)
- Height: 9 ft 10 in (3.00 m)
- Wing area: 233 sq ft (21.6 m^{2})
- Airfoil: root: NACA 23015.9; tip: NACA 4410
- Empty weight: 4,494 lb (2,038 kg)
- Gross weight: 6,060 lb (2,749 kg)
- Powerplant: 2 × Lycoming R-680-9 , 295 hp (220 kW) each
- Propellers: 2-bladed propellers

Performance

- Maximum speed: 197 mph (317 km/h, 171 kn)
- Cruise speed: 175 mph (282 km/h, 152 kn)
- Range: 750 mi (1,210 km, 650 nmi)
- Service ceiling: 19,000 ft (5,800 m)
- Time to altitude: 10,000 ft (3,000 m) in eight minutes and 36 seconds

== See also ==
Aircraft of comparable role, configuration, and era

- Beechcraft AT-10 Wichita
- Beechcraft AT-7 Navigator and AT-11 Kansan
- Cessna AT-17 Bobcat

Related lists

- List of aircraft of World War II
