= Gosnell =

Gosnell may refer to:

== People ==
- Bert Gosnell (1880–1972), English international footballer
- Harold Foote Gosnell (1896–1997), American political scientist and author
- James Frederick Gosnell, mayor of London, Ontario, Canada
- Jim Gosnell (1899–1969), Australian rules footballer
- Joseph Gosnell (1936–2020), distinguished leader of the Nisga'a people of northern British Columbia, Canada
- Kermit Gosnell (born 1941), American doctor, abortion provider, and convicted murderer in Philadelphia
- Raja Gosnell (born 1958), American film director and editor
- Stephen Gosnell (born 2001), American football player
- Tom Gosnell (1951–2014), mayor of London, Ontario, Canada

== Other uses ==
- Gosnell, Arkansas - a city in Mississippi County, Arkansas, United States
- Gosnell: The Trial of America's Biggest Serial Killer, a movie about Kermit Gosnell
- Gosnell School District

== See also ==
- Gosnells (disambiguation)
