= Live births following abortion attempts =

Rare phenomenon of live births following failed abortion

Live births following abortion attempts refer to a rare phenomenon in which an infant is born alive during or after an attempted termination of pregnancy (induced abortion). These cases may occur in two contexts: when an attempted abortion fails and the pregnancy continues to term, resulting in a live birth; or when a late termination of pregnancy results in the expulsion or delivery of an infant exhibiting signs of life.

Abortion is largely effective at terminating a pregnancy and precluding live birth. For example, the efficacy of medication abortion via the mifepristone/misoprostol regimen early in pregnancy is over 98%, though the efficacy declines as pregnancy progresses. A live birth following an attempted abortion, while overall uncommon, is most likely to occur with the labor induction abortion method, an abortion procedure used in the later second and third trimesters of pregnancy. It is particularly likely to occur if a feticidal injection is omitted or unsuccessful.

The concept of live births following abortion attempts is a recurring topic in the abortion debate. Individuals born under these circumstances are sometimes referred to as “abortion survivors” in media and political contexts. In response, policymakers in several countries have proposed laws addressing the phenomenon of infants being born alive after attempted abortions. While most such infants do not survive long after birth, a small number have lived into later childhood or adulthood.

== Medical overview ==
Several clinical studies have examined the medical circumstances under which live births can occur following attempted abortion, particularly in the second and third trimesters when the fetus has approached or is approaching viability (typically around 20 to 24 weeks of gestation). Additionally, though extremely rare, a few first trimester failed abortion attempts have resulted in live births later on in pregnancy. Live birth outcomes are most likely to occur with the labor induction abortion method and when feticidal measures, such as intracardiac injection to stop the fetal heartbeat, are unsuccessful or omitted. In the context of abortion, feticide refers to the intentional killing of an embryo or fetus prior to expulsion from the uterus.

One of the most comprehensive studies on this phenomenon is a 2024 retrospective cohort study published in the American Journal of Obstetrics and Gynecology. Reviewing over 13,000 second-trimester abortions (15–29 weeks gestation) in a cohort indicated for fetal anomaly, maternal emergency, or other causes performed in Quebec, Canada, the study found that 11.2% of these procedures resulted in live births. This risk was especially pronounced at 20–24 weeks, where the likelihood of live birth was nearly five times higher compared to abortions performed at 15–19 weeks. Significantly, the use of feticidal injections, specifically intracardiac or intrathoracic administration, reduced this relative likelihood by 57%.

These findings are supported by other clinical studies and observations as well. A 2018 study published in Obstetrics & Gynecology, which focused specifically on second-trimester abortions performed without feticide for fetal anomalies or genetic abnormalities between 20 and 24 weeks gestation, found that 50.6% of fetuses were born alive. The median survival time in these cases was 32 minutes. Live birth following the attempted abortions was more likely in cases involving higher gestational age and the absence of severe anomalies. A smaller study, published in 2016 via The Journal of Reproductive Medicine, found that 15% of labor induction abortions performed between 16 and 22 weeks gestation resulted in unintended live births. Most of these infants exhibited cardiac activity for less than two hours. Consistent with most other research, the probability of live birth increased with gestational age. The study also found that attempted terminations due to prenatal diagnoses of Down syndrome (trisomy 21) were associated with a higher likelihood of live birth.

Further evidence from outside North America provides additional context. A 2012–2015 study conducted in Switzerland and published in BMJ Open examined extremely low gestational age neonates (ELGANs) delivered during attempted late terminations of pregnancy (LTOP). This study reported that 39% (76 of 195) of LTOP cases resulted in live births, with feticide having only occurred in three instances. Reflecting a more restrictive approach to proactive care for ELGANs in Switzerland, no attempts were made to resuscitate the infants who were born alive, and all died in the delivery room shortly after. Contrary to findings by other similar studies, the study found no clear correlation between gestational age and the likelihood of live birth within this specific group.

To reduce the likelihood of live births following procedures intended to terminate pregnancy, some clinical guidelines recommend the use of feticidal injections in later abortions. For instance, in the United Kingdom, the Royal College of Obstetricians and Gynaecologists advises that feticide be offered for abortions occurring after 21 weeks of gestation. A 2023 study on abortion in England and Wales further explains this practice, noting that "termination of pregnancy resulting in live birth is rare before 22 weeks of gestation. However, after this time, the chances of having a live birth following [termination] increase," and that feticide is carried out to "avoid this by inducing fetal demise in the uterus before [abortion]."

== Incidence ==
National and regional data on live births following abortion attempts are limited, because few jurisdictions require separate reporting of live births after induced abortion, and because cases may be recorded under broader categories such as neonatal death or fetal anomaly. Available figures are therefore not directly comparable across countries and may reflect differences in registration rules, abortion methods, gestational age, use of feticide, and whether only deaths, rather than all live births, are counted.

=== United States ===
National data on live births following abortion attempts in the United States are limited. In 2019, FactCheck.org summarized a Centers for Disease Control and Prevention review of infant death certificates from 2003 to 2014, which identified 143 deaths involving induced terminations of pregnancy where the infant had been born alive. The CDC data included only deaths of infants born alive, not fetal deaths or stillbirths. PolitiFact reported that the 143 cases occurred during a twelve-year period in which more than 9.3 million abortion procedures were performed in the United States. Of the 143 deaths, about 42% occurred within one hour of birth, 54% occurred between one and 23 hours after birth, and about 4% occurred after one day.

The available figures are not comprehensive national incidence data. FactCheck.org reported that the CDC considered the figure of 143 deaths a possible underestimate, because in cases where it was unclear whether the pregnancy termination was induced or spontaneous, the CDC classified cases involving congenital anomalies or maternal complications as spontaneous terminations rather than induced terminations. As of 2019, FactCheck.org and PolitiFact reported that six states—Arizona, Florida, Michigan, Minnesota, Oklahoma, and Texas—had some form of reporting requirement for abortions resulting in live birth.

=== Canada ===
Canadian national data have been the subject of political dispute because some figures use broad infant-death classifications rather than a dedicated born-alive-abortion reporting system. In 2013, Maisonneuve reported that three Conservative Members of Parliament had called for an RCMP investigation into 491 deaths between 2000 and 2009 classified by Statistics Canada as "Termination of pregnancy, affecting fetus and newborn." The article noted that Statistics Canada described the classification as referring to a fetus that showed any sign of life after an abortion and complete removal from the mother, regardless of gestational age; such a sign of life could be as minor as umbilical cord pulsation, and the fetus could be many weeks from viability.

A 2024 retrospective cohort study in the American Journal of Obstetrics and Gynecology examined 13,777 second-trimester abortions performed in hospital settings in Quebec between 1989 and 2021. The study found that 1,541 abortions, or 11.2%, led to live birth. Most procedures were labor-induction abortions, and the risk of live birth was highest at 20 to 24 weeks of gestation. The study also found that feticidal injection reduced the risk of live birth, with intracardiac or intrathoracic injection being especially effective.

=== United Kingdom ===
In the United Kingdom, data is available mainly from regional studies and older perinatal mortality reports rather than a single national reporting system for all live births after attempted abortions. A population-based study in BJOG examined terminations of pregnancy for fetal anomaly in the West Midlands from 1995 to 2004. Among 3,189 terminations for fetal anomaly, 102 cases, or 3.2%, were live births.

A 2023 study on feticide before termination of pregnancy in England and Wales stated that live birth following termination is rare before 22 weeks of gestation, but that the likelihood increases after that point. The same study noted that feticide is used before some later terminations to induce fetal demise before abortion and thereby avoid live birth.

=== Australia ===
Although Australia does not have centralized national reporting on abortion outcomes, data from several states indicate that infants are occasionally born alive during abortion procedures. Between 2010 and 2020, Queensland reported 328 neonatal deaths (15.1% of all neonatal deaths) following live births during abortions, while Victoria reported 396 such deaths (17.1%).

In 2024, The Guardian reported that Australian health experts and professional organizations had told parliamentary inquiries that, on rare occasions, a non-viable baby may be born alive after an abortion. The Royal Australian and New Zealand College of Obstetricians and Gynaecologists described the scenario as uncommon and stated that only about 1% of abortions in Australia are performed after 20 weeks of gestation. According to the report, professional bodies disputed claims that large numbers of viable infants were being born alive and denied care.

=== Switzerland ===
A 2020 study in Swiss Medical Weekly examined delivery-room deaths after late termination of pregnancy at nine Swiss level III perinatal centers from July 2012 to June 2015. Among 195 late terminations of pregnancy at 22 to 27 weeks of gestation, 76 cases, or 39%, resulted in live birth. All infants born alive after late termination died in the delivery room without resuscitation attempts. The authors stated that late terminations of pregnancy should be included in perinatal registries and that uniform reporting should be established.

== Law and policy ==
Infants born alive during or after attempted abortion procedures are recognized as legal persons in most jurisdictions, entitled de jure to the same rights and protections as other live-born individuals. However, the consistency of enforcement can vary between countries and legal systems. While international definitions, such as that of the World Health Organization, offer standardized criteria for what constitutes a live birth, legal obligations regarding resuscitation or postnatal care are often governed by regional law or left to clinical discretion.

=== Canada ===
Under section 223(1) of the Canadian Criminal Code, a child becomes a legal "human being" when it has completely proceeded, in a living state, from the body of its mother, regardless of whether it has breathed or whether the umbilical cord has been severed. Section 223(2) states that causing injury to a child before or during birth, resulting in the child's death after proceeding from the body of the mother, constitutes homicide.

In 2013, several Members of Parliament raised concerns over 491 reported cases of live births following abortion between 2000 and 2009, asking the Royal Canadian Mounted Police to investigate whether any constituted infanticide. The Prime Minister at the time, Stephen Harper, opposed a probe into the reported cases, and no formal investigation followed.

=== United Kingdom ===
In the United Kingdom, a baby born alive must be registered regardless of the length of pregnancy, and any later death must be registered like any other death. In England and Wales, Chief Coroner’s Guidance No. 45 states that a child born showing signs of life after a termination of pregnancy has had an independent legal life; if live birth is uncertain, the coroner may make preliminary inquiries or open an investigation.

Clinical guidance has aimed both to prevent and plan for such cases. The Nuffield Council on Bioethics wrote in 2006 that feticide was recommended before labor is induced after 21 weeks and six days’ gestation “to ensure that the fetus is not born alive" to avoid dilemmas over whether a baby born alive after termination should be resuscitated.

The Royal College of Obstetricians and Gynaecologists stated in a 2023 position statement that live birth after abortion is “uncommon but can occur,” especially at later gestations, and described feticide as a procedure used to “prevent the fetus from being born alive.” RCOG recommends the proposal of feticide when abortion is performed after 21 weeks and 6 days, and states that when live birth occurs, or signs of life are uncertain, the coroner or procurator fiscal should be notified. In 2010, another statement by RCOG on live births following abortion was particularly tailored to abortion in the case of fetal abnormality, in which RCOG suggested the routine proposal of feticide in the case of non-terminal fetal abnormalities after 22 weeks due to the fact that failure to do this "could result in live birth and survival, an outcome that contradicts the intention of the abortion." RCOG stated in this report that, if the child is born alive, the child should receive "neonatal support and intensive care" as indicated by its condition and "managed within published guidance for neonatal practice."

=== United States ===
In the United States, the federal Born-Alive Infants Protection Act of 2002 (BAIPA) was enacted with wide bipartisan support in response to several reports of infants being born alive after failed abortion attempts. The law clarified that any infant "who is born alive at any stage of development" – even after an attempted abortion – is legally recognized as a living person, entitled to the same rights and protections thereof. Even before BAIPA, federal policy addressed care for newborns through the Child Abuse Prevention and Treatment Act (CAPTA) and related regulations in the 1980s. These so-called "Baby Doe" rules make certain federal funding conditional on states having policies to prevent the improper withholding of medically indicated treatment from disabled newborns.

While the Born-Alive Infants Protection Act affirms that infants born alive after attempted abortions are legal persons, it imposes no additional penalties or medical obligations. To address this gap, lawmakers have repeatedly introduced the Born-Alive Abortion Survivors Protection Act (BAASPA), which would require providers to offer the same care to abortion survivors as to any other newborn at the same gestational age and to transport them to a hospital. The bill includes penalties of fines and up to five years in prison for failure to provide care or report violations and reaffirms that intentionally killing a born-alive infant constitutes murder. The House passed BAASPA in 2015, 2023, and 2025, with unanimous Republican support and minimal Democratic backing, but it has failed to advance in the Senate. Supporters argue it closes a loophole by penalizing medical neglect, while opponents, including the American College of Obstetricians and Gynecologists and Planned Parenthood, argue it's unnecessary and could compel futile treatment in rare, complex cases. As of 2025, the bill remains symbolic and unenacted.

==== State legislation ====
As of 2026, 16 U.S. states have laws addressing medical care for infants born alive during or after an attempted abortion, including Arizona, Arkansas, Florida, Indiana, Kansas, Kentucky, Michigan, Missouri, Montana, North Carolina, Ohio, Oklahoma, Pennsylvania, South Dakota, Texas, and West Virginia. Such laws generally require medically appropriate care and may impose hospital-transfer, reporting, or penalty provisions. Florida requires the same degree of professional care provided to other infants born at the same gestational age and hospital transfer when necessary, while Kansas requires care and hospital transport and establishes penalties for violations. Pennsylvania requires a second physician at certain post-viability abortions to provide immediate care and take reasonable steps to preserve the life and health of an infant born alive. Other states have altered or rejected comparable provisions: New York repealed its former law in 2019, Minnesota replaced language requiring measures to "preserve the life and health" of a born-alive infant with a general duty to "care for the infant who is born alive" in 2023, and Wisconsin has repeatedly considered similar legislation without enacting it.

== Notable cases ==
Although uncommon, some cases of live birth following attempted abortion have been covered by news organizations, particularly where legal proceedings, public testimony, or social advocacy later occurred. Some notable cases include:

Name/Case	Nationality	Birth	Abortion Attempt	Description
Gianna Jessen	American	1977	Instillation abortion at 29 weeks (third trimester)	Gianna Jessen speaking at an anti-abortion event. Jessen was born alive following an attempted saline instillation abortion at approximately seven and a half months' gestation. The lack of oxygen during the attempt left her with cerebral palsy. Jessen has since become a prominent anti-abortion activist. The 2011 film October Baby is based on her story. She has testified before the U.S. Congress and other government bodies, and was present at the signing of the U.S. Born-Alive Infants Protection Act in 2002. At a 2015 hearing regarding Planned Parenthood, she asked Planned Parenthood in her testimony, "if abortion is about women's rights, then where were mine?"
Melissa Ohden	American	1977	Instillation abortion at 31 weeks (third trimester)	Ohden was born alive during an attempted saline instillation abortion in 1977. She was born in Iowa weighing less than three pounds, and was initially mistaken for dead until she was heard crying. Adopted as an infant, Melissa learned as a teenager that she had survived an abortion. She eventually obtained her medical records, confirming the failed procedure, and reunited with her birth mother decades later. Melissa Ohden went on to become an author and activist, chronicling her experience in her memoir, You Carried Me. She founded the Abortion Survivors Network (ASN), the first support and advocacy group for people like herself.
Claire Culwell	American	1988	Dilation and evacuation at 20 weeks (second trimester)	Culwell survived a failed second-trimester abortion that was intended to terminate a twin pregnancy. Her birth mother, unaware she was carrying twins, underwent an abortion at around 20 weeks gestation that successfully aborted one fetus but left the other, Claire, alive. She was born prematurely weeks later with medical complications, including hip dislocation, and spent months in a body cast. Adopted as an infant, Culwell later learned of her birth circumstances and became an anti-abortion speaker and author.
Ana Rosa Rodriguez	American	1991	Intact dilation and extraction at 32 weeks (third trimester)	Rodriguez was born alive following a failed third-trimester abortion. At approximately 32 weeks gestation, Rodriguez's mother sought an abortion in New York City. The abortion provider, Dr. Abu Hayat, attempted an intact dilation and extraction (partial-birth abortion) procedure and in the process severed Ana Rosa's right arm. When the procedure could not be completed, the mother was sent home. Hours later, she went into labor and delivered Ana Rosa alive in a hospital – missing one arm but otherwise relatively healthy. The case led to Dr. Hayat's arrest and conviction and drew national attention to late-term abortion practices.
Josiah Presley	South Korean	1995	Dilation and curettage at 8 weeks (first trimester)	At approximately two months gestation, Presley's biological mother underwent a surgical abortion, but the procedure was unsuccessful. Presley was later born with a deformed arm as a result of the attempted abortion. He spent over a year in a foster home before being adopted by an American family in Oklahoma. Presley learned about the abortion attempt at age 13 and has since shared his experience publicly as part of his advocacy against abortion, including speaking at the March for Life and in anti-abortion media campaigns.
The Oldenburg Baby	German	1997	Induction abortion at 25 weeks (second trimester)	Tim was a German child born alive in 1997 after a failed late-term abortion in Oldenburg, Germany. According to The Irish Times, Tim had been diagnosed with Down syndrome before birth, and the abortion was scheduled after his mother threatened suicide. The report stated that the doctor did not use potassium chloride to stop the fetal heartbeat, assuming Tim would not survive labor. He was born weighing 690 grams, was reportedly left wrapped in a towel for nine hours, and later received medical care after staff realized he was still alive. Tim was raised by foster parents Bernhard and Simone Guido and died in 2019 at age 21 from a lung infection.
Shanice Osbourne	American	2006	Induction abortion at 23 weeks (second trimester)	Osbourne was an infant born alive during an attempted abortion in Hialeah, Florida. According to an Associated Press report published by CBS News, Sycloria Williams, then 18 years old and 23 weeks pregnant, delivered a live baby girl after Dr. Pierre Jean-Jacque Renelique did not arrive in time to complete the procedure. The report stated that a clinic owner without a medical license cut the umbilical cord and trashed the infant in a biohazard bag, and that police later recovered the remains in a cardboard box after anonymous tips. An autopsy later determined that the infant, whom Williams named Shanice, had filled her lungs with air, indicating live birth; the cause of death was listed as extreme prematurity. Writing for FindLaw, legal scholar Sherry F. Colb described the case as one in which the alleged conduct occurred after Williams had delivered, and noted that Belkis Gonzalez was charged with tampering with evidence and practicing medicine without a license.
Gosnell Case	American	2006–2010	Intact dilation and extraction or induction abortion along with infanticide at various stages (second and third trimesters)	Kermit Gosnell was a convicted murderer and former abortion doctor in Philadelphia. Gosnell was found guilty in 2013 of murdering three infants who were born alive during illegal late-term abortion procedures at his clinic, as well as the involuntary manslaughter of a woman who died from an overdose of anesthesia. He was sentenced to life imprisonment without parole. Former staff testified that live births were routine at the facility, and that Gosnell or his employees would kill surviving infants (hundreds of them) by severing their spinal cords. Investigators discovered the human remains of 47 victims stored in jars, freezers, and boxes during a 2010 raid. Prosecutors alleged that Gosnell may have killed hundreds of infants born alive following abortion attempts over the years, but poor documentation and the clinic's unsanitary, secretive practices made it impossible to confirm the total number. The clinic became a central example in public debates over born-alive infants and late-term abortion.
