= Jermey Parnell =

American football player (born 1986)

No. 78
- Position: Offensive tackle

Personal information
- Born: July 20, 1986 (age 40); Blytheville, Arkansas, U.S.
- Listed height: 6 ft 6 in (1.98 m)
- Listed weight: 326 lb (148 kg)

Career information
- High school: Gosnell (Gosnell, Arkansas)
- College: Ole Miss
- NFL draft: 2009: undrafted

Career history
- New Orleans Saints (2009–2010)*; Miami Dolphins (2010); New Orleans Saints (2010)*; Dallas Cowboys (2010–2014); Jacksonville Jaguars (2015–2018)
- * Offseason or practice squad member only

Awards and highlights
- Super Bowl champion (XLIV)

Career NFL statistics
- Games played: 111
- Games started: 64
- Stats at Pro Football Reference

Jermey Alexander Parnell (born June 20, 1986) is an American former professional football player who was an offensive tackle in the National Football League (NFL). He played college football and basketball at Ole Miss Rebels. He was a member of the NFL's New Orleans Saints, Miami Dolphins, Dallas Cowboys and Jacksonville Jaguars. He was signed by the Saints as an undrafted free agent in 2009.

== Early life ==
Parnell attended Gosnell High School in Gosnell, Arkansas, where he lettered in basketball. As a senior, he registered averages of 21 points, 13 rebounds, 5 assists and 4 blocks, contributing to his team reaching the 2004 3A State Tournament semifinals. He earned All-state honors twice, while averaging a double-double during his junior and senior seasons.

He accepted a basketball scholarship from the University of Mississippi. As a junior, he averaged 4.9 point and 4.0 rebounds per contest. As a senior, he started 7 out of 30 games, averaging 3.7 points and 3.3 rebounds per contest, while ranking second on the team with 22 blocked shots.

As a senior in 2009, although he hadn’t played football since the eighth grade, head coach Houston Nutt convinced him to try out for the football team, which led him to play in five games as a defensive end and make one tackle for a loss.

== Professional career ==
=== New Orleans Saints (first stint) ===
Parnell was signed as an undrafted free agent by the New Orleans Saints after the 2009 NFL draft to play defensive end. He was waived at the end of training camp on September 5. He spent the rest of the season on their practice squad where he was tried at defensive tackle, tight end and offensive tackle. Although he was never in a game, he was awarded a Super Bowl XLIV ring. He was released on September 4, 2010.

=== Miami Dolphins ===
On September 5, 2010, Parnell was claimed by the Miami Dolphins to their active roster, where he remained for 20 days until being released on September 25, to make room for Patrick Brown, whom the Dolphins claimed off waivers from the New York Jets.

=== New Orleans Saints (second stint) ===
On September 29, 2010, he was signed to the New Orleans Saints' practice squad.

=== Dallas Cowboys ===
On October 14, 2010, the Dallas Cowboys signed Parnell to their active roster with the intention of converting him to a full-time offensive tackle. In 2011, he participated in his first six career games, playing on special teams and as a backup offensive tackle.

On April 26, 2012, he was re-signed to a three-year contract. That same season after Tyron Smith suffered a high ankle sprain against the Cleveland Browns, he replaced him as the team starting left tackle and also in the next game against the Washington Redskins. When Smith returned, Parnell was worked into a regular rotation with starting right tackle Doug Free.

In 2013, he was expected to compete for the right tackle position with Free, but suffered a hamstring injury during the preseason and fell behind.

In 2014, he started eight games at right tackle including the playoffs, after Free was sidelined with a foot fracture and an ankle injury.

=== Jacksonville Jaguars ===
On March 11, 2015, Parnell signed with the Jacksonville Jaguars as an unrestricted free agent, to become the starter at right tackle and help to upgrade one of the worst offensive lines in the league. He started 15 games and was declared inactive in the last contest of the season because of a hamstring injury.

Parnell started all 16 games in 2016. He started 13 games, missing three contests with a knee injury in 2017.

In 2018, Parnell started the first 13 games at right tackle, before being placed on injured reserve with a knee injury on December 22.

On March 9, 2019, Parnell was released by the Jaguars. He started at right tackle in all the 57 games he played in, missing 7 contests with injury problems.
