= Gianna Jessen =

American anti-abortion activist

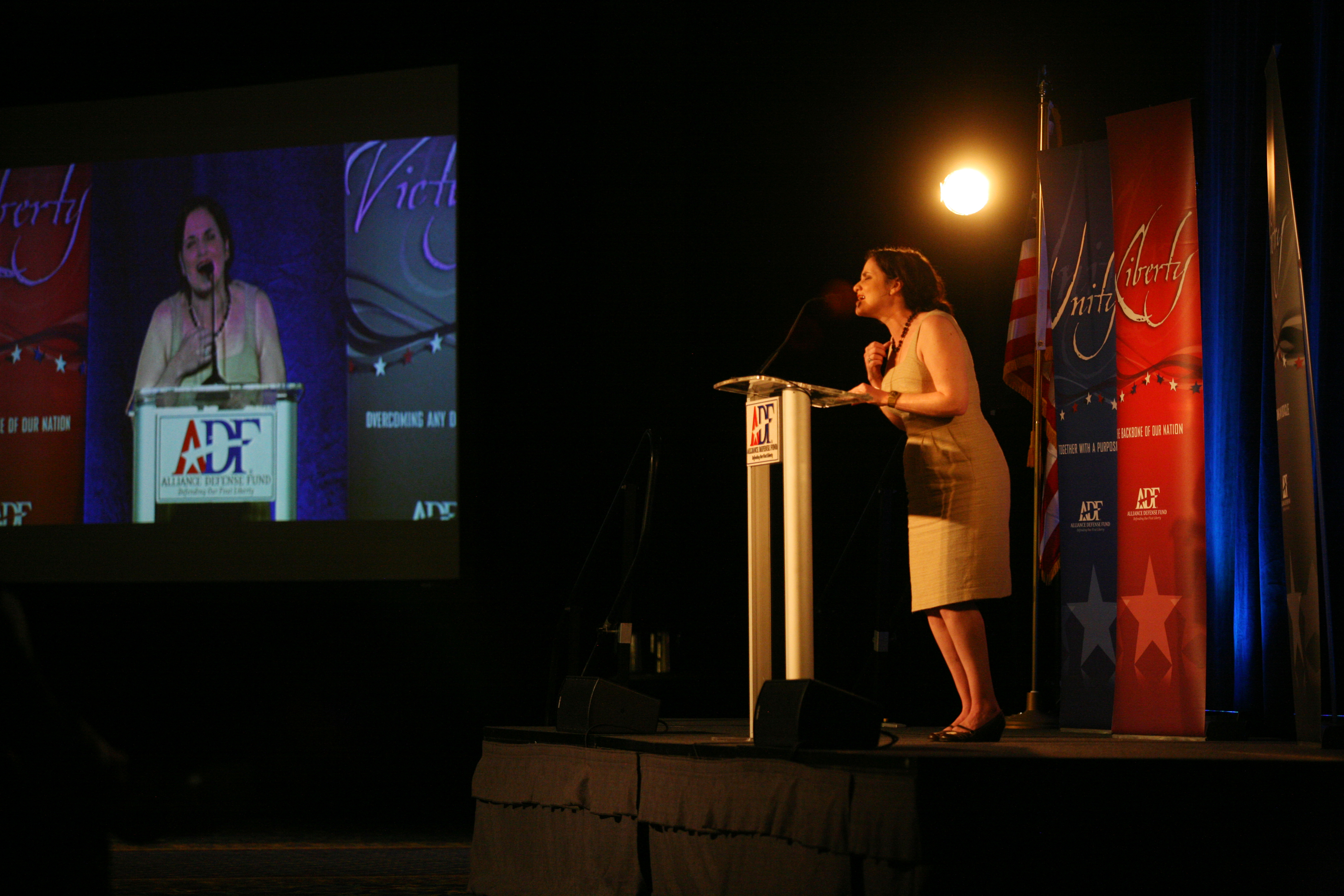
- Jessen as a featured speaker at an Alliance Defense Fund banquet in Meadowview, Virginia.
- Born: April 6, 1977 (age 48); Los Angeles, California, U.S.
- Occupation: anti-abortion activist
- Known for: Speech at Constitution Subcommittee of the House Judiciary Committee, April 22, 1996.
- Website: www.giannajessen.com

Gianna Jessen (born April 6, 1977) is an American anti-abortion activist. She was born during a failed instillation abortion attempt. The 2011 film October Baby is loosely based on Jessen's life.

== Early life ==
Jessen was born April 6, 1977, in Los Angeles, California. Her medical records indicate that she was born in the 30th week of pregnancy to a 17-year-old girl during a failed saline abortion. Jessen's birth certificate is signed by the doctor who was performing the abortion.

Jessen weighed 2.5 pounds (1.1 kg) at birth, and was born with cerebral palsy, a motor condition that affects various areas of body movement, which she says was caused by the abortion attempt. She describes it as a "tremendous gift". Jessen spent three months in the hospital before being placed in foster care. She was adopted at the age of four.

== Career ==
=== 1990s ===
Jessen's career as an activist began in 1991, when she was 14, after her adoptive mother, Diana DePaul, told Jessen she was born to a 17-year-old girl, during a failed abortion attempt. Jessen has since campaigned against abortion, saying "It's more comfortable for people to think of abortion as a political decision, or a right. But I am not a right. I am a human being". Jessen said she's forgiven her birth mother, but is not interested in a relationship with her, citing a strong relationship with her adoptive mother. Jessen has also campaigned against exceptions to late-term abortion laws, on the grounds of fetal disability, citing her own disability. Jessen appeared on the Maury Povich Show with her adoptive mother in 1991. In reporting her story and publicizing Jessen's early life to the nation, The New York Times observed that Jessen and Becky Bell, a teenage girl who reportedly died as a result of a botched unsafe abortion in 1988, had become the symbols of America's debate over abortion and characterized them as "poster girls whose stories are being shrewdly marketed by their supporters to keep passions high." Jessen is a stage name that was adopted when she began her activism.

In 1995, four years after Jessen was placed in the national spotlight, author Jessica Shaver published a biography on Jessen. In early 1996, Festival of Light Australia sponsored an Australian tour, during which Jessen spoke at venues in all states and territories.

=== 2000s ===
In his speech at the 2002 signing of the Born-Alive Infants Protection Act President George W. Bush mentioned Jessen, acknowledging her presence and extending his appreciation.

In December 2005 Jessen travelled to London to support a campaign to reduce the number of abortions under the UK Abortion Act and to speak at a parliamentary meeting at the House of Commons. Both the Archbishop of Canterbury and the Archbishop of Westminster indicated that they hoped her story would encourage Parliament to look again at abortion.

On May 8, 2006, the Colorado State House of Representatives considered a resolution honoring the 90th anniversary of a local branch of Planned Parenthood. Republican representative Ted Harvey invited Jessen to sing the national anthem to the House that day and then told her story "because, 'I just wanted to put a face to this celebration'."

In September 2008, Jessen was in Canberra, Australia, sponsored by the Australian Christian Lobby, to lobby federal politicians on late term abortions. The same month, Jessen appeared in a political advertisement during the 2008 US presidential campaign stating, "If Barack Obama had his way, I wouldn't be here", referring to Obama's opposition to "born alive" legislation.

=== 2010s ===
In September 2015, Jessen testified at a Congressional hearing investigating Planned Parenthood's practices regarding fetal tissue donation, following the Planned Parenthood 2015 undercover videos controversy. During her testimony, Jessen said she would ask Planned Parenthood the following question: "If abortion is about women's rights, then what were mine?"

== See also ==
- The Oldenburg Baby, a German child born after a failed abortion attempt
