= Born-Alive Infants Protection Act =

US law against neonaticide

- Long title: Born-Alive Infants Protection Act of 2002
- Acronyms (colloquial): BAIPA
- Enacted by: the 107th United States Congress

Citations
- Public law: 107-207
- Statutes at Large: 116 Stat. 926

Codification
- Titles amended: 1
- U.S.C. sections created: 1 U.S.C. § 8

Legislative history
- Introduced in the House as H.R. 2175 by Steve Chabot (R–OH) on June 14, 2001; Passed the House on March 12, 2002 (voice vote); Passed the Senate on July 18, 2002 (unanimous consent); Signed into law by President George W. Bush on August 5, 2002

The Born-Alive Infants Protection Act of 2002 ("BAIPA" Pub. L. 107–207 (text) (PDF), 116 Stat. 926, enacted August 5, 2002, 1 U.S.C. § 8) is an Act of Congress. It affirms legal protection to an infant born alive after a failed attempt at induced abortion. It was signed by President George W. Bush.

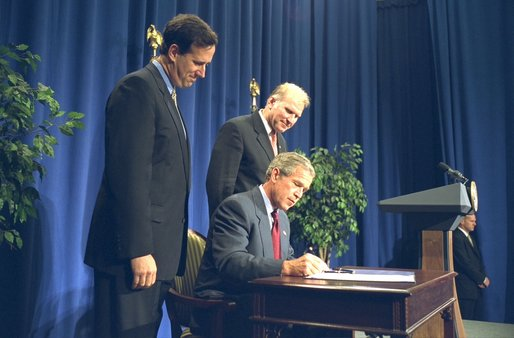
President Bush signs the Born-Alive Infants Protection Act on August 5, 2002

== Legislative history ==
- Based on H.R. 2175 – passed March 12, 2002
- Introduced on June 14, 2001
- Reported by Committee on August 2, 2001
- Passed House on March 12, 2002
- Passed Senate by unanimous consent July 18, 2002.
- Signed into law by President Bush in Pittsburgh at the Pittsburgh Hilton. on August 5, 2002
- The original author of the bill was Congressman Charles T. Canady of Florida who had by then retired from Congress.

=== Committee of the House ===
The bill was approved by the committee on July 12, 2001. The committee consisted of 32 representatives, 25 of which voted for the bill, 2 against and 10 were not present during the vote. This vote allowed the bill to be passed onto the entire house of representatives.

== See also ==
- Born alive rule
- Baby Doe Law
- Gianna Jessen
- Jill Stanek
- Kermit Gosnell
