= Gosnells =

The name Gosnells may refer to:

== Places ==
- City of Gosnells, a local government area in Western Australia
- Gosnells, Western Australia, a suburb located 20 kilometres (12 mi) south-southeast of Perth

== Other uses ==
- Electoral district of Gosnells, represented in the Western Australian Legislative Assembly
- Gosnells railway station, Perth, located on the Armadale railway line

== See also ==
- Gosnell (disambiguation)
- List of mayors of Gosnells
