= Jill Stanek =

American anti-abortion activist

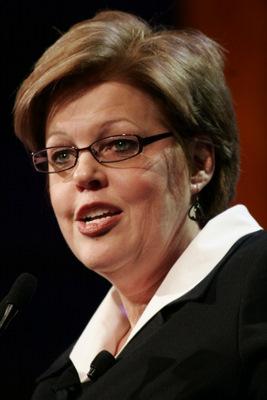
- Stanek in 2009
- Born: 1956 (age 69–70)
- Occupations: Anti-abortion activist and nurse
- Known for: Saying "live birth abortions" were being performed at Christ Hospital in the Chicago suburb of Oak Lawn and the premature infants were being left to die in a utility room
- Medical career
- Profession: Nurse
- Field: Maternity
- Institutions: Christ Hospital in Oak Lawn, Illinois
- Website: Official website

Jill Stanek (born 1956) is an American anti-abortion activist and nurse from Illinois best known for saying "live birth abortions" were being performed at Christ Hospital in the Chicago suburb of Oak Lawn and the premature infants were being left to die in a utility room.

== Career ==
After witnessing a car accident, Stanek studied nursing, gaining a degree in nursing in 1993. She began working at Christ Hospital in Oak Lawn, Illinois after graduating, spending two years in a cardiac ward before moving to a maternity ward.

=== Christ Hospital controversy ===
Stanek gained initial prominence in 1999 when she testified that, while she worked at Christ Hospital, infants that survived induced labor abortions were abandoned to die in a utility room. These allegations led to a formal investigation by the Illinois Department of Public Health, which stated that the hospital violated no state laws. A Christ Hospital spokesman admitted "that between 10 percent and 20 percent of fetuses with genetic defects that are aborted survive for short periods outside the womb." Shortly thereafter, Advocate Health Care changed its policy on induced labor abortions, barring its use against fetuses with non-lethal developmental issues. Stanek was fired by Christ Hospital in 2001, for allegedly "taking photographs inside the hospital and misrepresenting the hospital on a television program."

At the signing ceremony for the Born-Alive Infants Protection Act in 2002, President George W. Bush named Stanek in his speech, publicly thanking her for being in attendance.

Stanek ran for the Republican nomination for the Illinois House of Representatives in 2002, on an anti-abortion platform, but was defeated.

Since 2003, Stanek has been a regular columnist for WorldNetDaily and her analysis and opinions are frequently referenced in the context of the abortion issue.

As of 2017, Stanek was the national campaign chair of the Susan B. Anthony List, an anti-abortion organisation.

=== Criticism of Barack Obama ===
Stanek generated national news during the 2008 Presidential campaign when publicizing Barack Obama's four votes against Illinois' Born Alive Infants Protection Act while state senator, as well as his state senate floor testimony. She posted a vote tally on her blog showing that, during a March 12, 2003, meeting of the Illinois State Senate's Health and Human Services Committee, Committee Chairman Barack Obama prevented the passage of an amendment to Bill 1082 that would have conveyed "the rights of personhood upon any fetus expelled or extracted from the womb if that fetus was capable of breathing or voluntary motion."

== Personal life ==
Stanek lives in Mokena, Illinois. She and her husband Richard have three children.

== See also ==
- Kermit Gosnell
- United States pro-life movement
