= Gosnell High School =

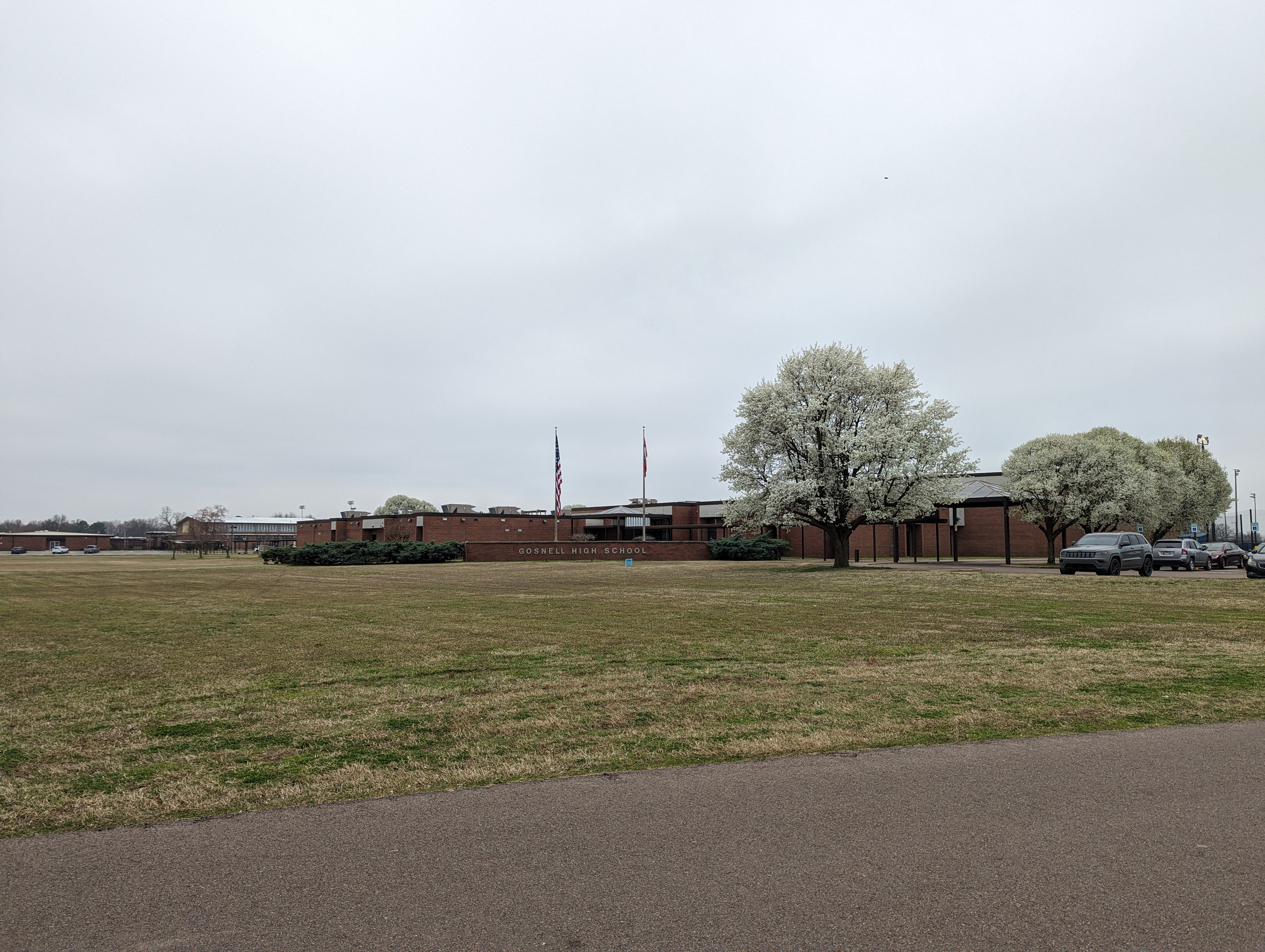
- Gosnell Arkansas High School

Location
- 600 AR 181; Gosnell, Arkansas 72315; United States
- Coordinates: 35°57′44″N 89°58′0″W

Information
- School type: Public comprehensive
- Status: Open
- School district: Gosnell School District
- CEEB code: 040230
- NCES School ID: 050002901277
- Principal: Keelan Newsom
- Teaching staff: 58.57 (on FTE basis)
- Grades: 7–12
- Enrollment: 606 (2023-2024)
- Student to teacher ratio: 10.35
- Education system: ADE Smart Core
- Classes offered: Regular, Advanced Placement (AP)
- Hours in school day: 8
- Colors: Blue and gold
- Athletics: Football, golf, basketball, baseball, softball, track, cheer
- Athletics conference: 3A Region 3
- Mascot: Pirate
- Team name: Gosnell Pirates
- Accreditation: ADE
- Newspaper: The Spy Glass
- Feeder schools: Gosnell Elementary School (PK–6)
- Website: www.gosnellschool.net/o/ghs

Gosnell High School (or Gosnell Secondary School) is an accredited comprehensive public high school located in the city of Gosnell, Arkansas, United States, located northwest of Blytheville. The school provides secondary education for students in grades 7 through 12. It is one of four public high schools in Mississippi County, Arkansas and the sole high school administered by the Gosnell School District.

The school district, and therefore the high school, serves Gosnell and Dell as well as portions of Blytheville.

== History ==
C.F. Cooper, an early Superintendent of the Gosnell School District, oversaw the start of the district's high school curriculum in 1930. Following the closure of Blytheville Army Airfield in 1946, a portion of the High School was moved to the officer's club on the deactivated military base. The building burned down on May 6, 1955, only a few days after it was announced the high school was moving back to Gosnell.

On July 1, 1984, the Dell School District merged into the Gosnell School District.

Gosnell High School has been the center of several controversies. In 2019, a teacher and assistant football coach was arrested for conspiracy to traffic controlled substances. The same year, a different teacher was placed under investigation for making inappropriate remarks towards a foreign student. Reportedly, she told a Chinese student who had recently moved to the United States to "learn English or you shouldn't be in our country."

== Athletics ==
The Gosnell High School mascot and athletic emblem is the Pirate with blue and gold serving as the school colors.

The Gosnell Pirates compete in interscholastic activities within the 3A Classification via the 3A Region 3 Conference, as administered by the Arkansas Activities Association. The Pirates participate in football, bowling (boys/girls), golf (boys/girls), basketball (boys/girls), cheer, competitive cheer, baseball, softball, robotics, and track and field (boys/girls).

On February 11, 2006, the Gosnell boys basketball team were on the winning side of the highest scoring game in Arkansas prep history with a 221 combined point game (Gosnell 114, Brookland 107).

The 1998 Gosnell Pirates football scored a state record 77 touchdowns in a season, which has since been eclipsed twice.

The Gosnell Public Schools football field and stadium is named the J.W. Rea Football Field Stadium with the city name of Gosnell as noted on a large metal sign near the main stadium entrance. The football field and stadium were constructed in the late 1960s. The stadium and field were named in honor of J.W. Rea, superintendent of the Gosnell Public Schools (1956–1977), at the time of his retirement in 1977. During Mr. Rea's 21-year tenure, the Gosnell Public Schools underwent sudden growth by the reactivated Blytheville Air Force Base in the late 1950s. During the Cold War Era, the Blytheville Air Force Base was a strategic air base in the United States's Strategic Defense programs. As the Cold War Era subsided in the late 1980s and early 1990s, the Blytheville Air Force Base was marked for closure that occurred in 1992.

== Notable alumni ==
- Jermey Parnell — NFL professional football player.
