= List of mayors of Gosnells =

The City of Gosnells in Perth, Western Australia was originally established as the Gosnells Road District, with a chairman and councillors, on 26 April 1907 under the Municipal Corporations Act 1906. Its land area had formerly been part of the Canning Road District, which was abolished due to squabbling between its rural and urban sections. The first elections were held on 1 June 1907. With the passage of the Local Government Act 1960, all road districts became Shires, with a president and councillors, effective 1 July 1961. On 1 July 1973, the Shire of Gosnells became the Town of Gosnells, with a mayor and councillors, and on 1 July 1977 it became a City.

== Gosnells Road District ==
| Chairman | Term |
|---|---|
| W. W. (Walter) Alcock | 1907–1911 |
| R. B. Bradley | 1911–1913 |
| James Ross McKenzie | 1913–1915 |
| R. McL. Dickie | 1915–1917 |
| W. J. Lambert | 1917–1919 |
| W. J. Griffiths | 1919–1920 |
| Robert Cowen | 1920–1922 |
| R. E. Francis | 1922–1924 |
| R. Palin | 1924–1926 |
| A. A. Lewis | 1926–1927 |
| William Richard (Billy) Orr | 1927–1936 |
| Ernest Phillips | 1936–1946 |
| William Henry Langford | 1946–1950 |
| E. V. (Vic) Martin | 1950–1952 |
| Arthur A. Mills | 1952–1961 |

== Shire of Gosnells ==
| President | Term |
|---|---|
| Arthur A. Mills | 1961–1973 |

== Town of Gosnells ==
| Mayor | Term |
|---|---|
| Arthur A. Mills | 1973–1977 |

== City of Gosnells ==
| Mayor | Term |
|---|---|
| Arthur A. Mills | 1977–1979 |
| Ray Harris | 1979–1983 |
| Lyal Richardson | 1983–1989 |
| Patricia Morris | 1989–1993 |
| Olwen Searle | 1993–1996 |
| N. J. Smith | 1996–1999 |
| Patricia Morris | 1999–2007 |
| Olwen Searle | 2007–2011 |
| Dave Griffiths | 2011–2015 |
| Olwen Searle | 2015–2017 |
| Glenn Dewhurst | 2017–2019 |
| David Goode | 2019–2021 |
| Terresa Lynes | 2021–present |
