= Oldenburg Baby =

German child born alive after an attempted abortion (1997–2019)

The Oldenburg Baby (German: Oldenburger Baby) was the name used in German media for Tim (6 July 1997 – 4 January 2019), a German individual with Down syndrome who was born alive in Oldenburg, Lower Saxony, after late abortion at around 25 weeks' gestation. His case became a focus of public debate in Germany about late abortion, prenatal diagnosis, disability, and the medical treatment of infants born alive after abortion procedures. Tim was raised by foster parents Bernhard and Simone Guido. He died on 4 January 2019 at the age of 21 after a lung infection.

== Background and birth ==
Tim's biological mother sought an abortion after a prenatal diagnosis of trisomy 21, the chromosomal condition that causes Down syndrome. Contemporary and later reports state that the pregnancy was terminated by inducing birth, with doctors expecting the child to die before or shortly after delivery.

Tim was born alive at the Städtische Kliniken Oldenburg in the night of 5–6 July 1997. Focus reported that he weighed 690 grams and measured 32 centimeters at birth. According to later press accounts, he was wrapped in towels and left without active medical treatment for approximately nine hours because doctors believed he would soon die. Medical care began only after he continued breathing.

== Life and health ==
Tim's biological parents did not raise him. He was taken in by Bernhard and Simone Guido, who later also fostered two girls with Down syndrome. The Guidos received the Order of Merit of the Federal Republic of Germany in 2006 for their care of children with disabilities.

Reports described Tim as having significant disabilities beyond Down syndrome, including limited speech, physical impairments, repeated operations, and autistic traits. Some reports attributed part of his later medical condition to the period without medical care after birth. In 2015, his foster parents published a book with Kathrin Fezer Schadt titled Tim lebt! Wie uns ein Junge, den es nicht geben sollte, die Augen geöffnet hat.

Tim died on 4 January 2019 at the age of 21 after a lung infection.

== Legal and public response ==
The case led to civil and criminal legal disputes. In 1997, Tim's biological parents sued the clinic doctors for damages, arguing that the abortion had not been completed as intended. Separately, opponents of late abortion, including CDU politician Hubert Hüppe, filed complaints over the lack of medical care after Tim's birth.

The Oldenburg public prosecutor's office initially discontinued the criminal investigation, but the matter was later reopened. In 2004, according to Focus and later press accounts, a penalty order of 90 daily rates against the responsible gynecologist became final for dangerous bodily injury by means of life-threatening treatment.

The case became a recurring topic in German debates over Spätabtreibungen ("late abortions"). A 2008 Bundestag research paper noted that the German Criminal Code did not use the term Spätabtreibung, although political debate often used it for abortions from around the 23rd week of pregnancy, or in some contexts from the 20th week because of possible viability outside the womb.

During a 2008 Bundestag debate, conservative politicians cited Tim's case in support of stricter counseling and reflection-period requirements after prenatal diagnoses, while other lawmakers warned that legal changes could increase pressure on women in crisis pregnancies. In 2009, the Bundestag approved changes to German pregnancy-conflict law requiring additional medical counseling and a three-day consideration period in certain late-abortion cases; the changes took effect in 2010.

== Media coverage ==
Tim's case was covered repeatedly by German media, including Focus, Die Welt, and regional outlets. In 2005, the ARD/WDR documentary series Menschen hautnah aired a film about him titled Er sollte sterben, doch Tim lebt. Eine Abtreibung und ihre Folgen.

== See also ==
- Abortion in Germany
