= Gosnell School District =

School district in Arkansas, United States

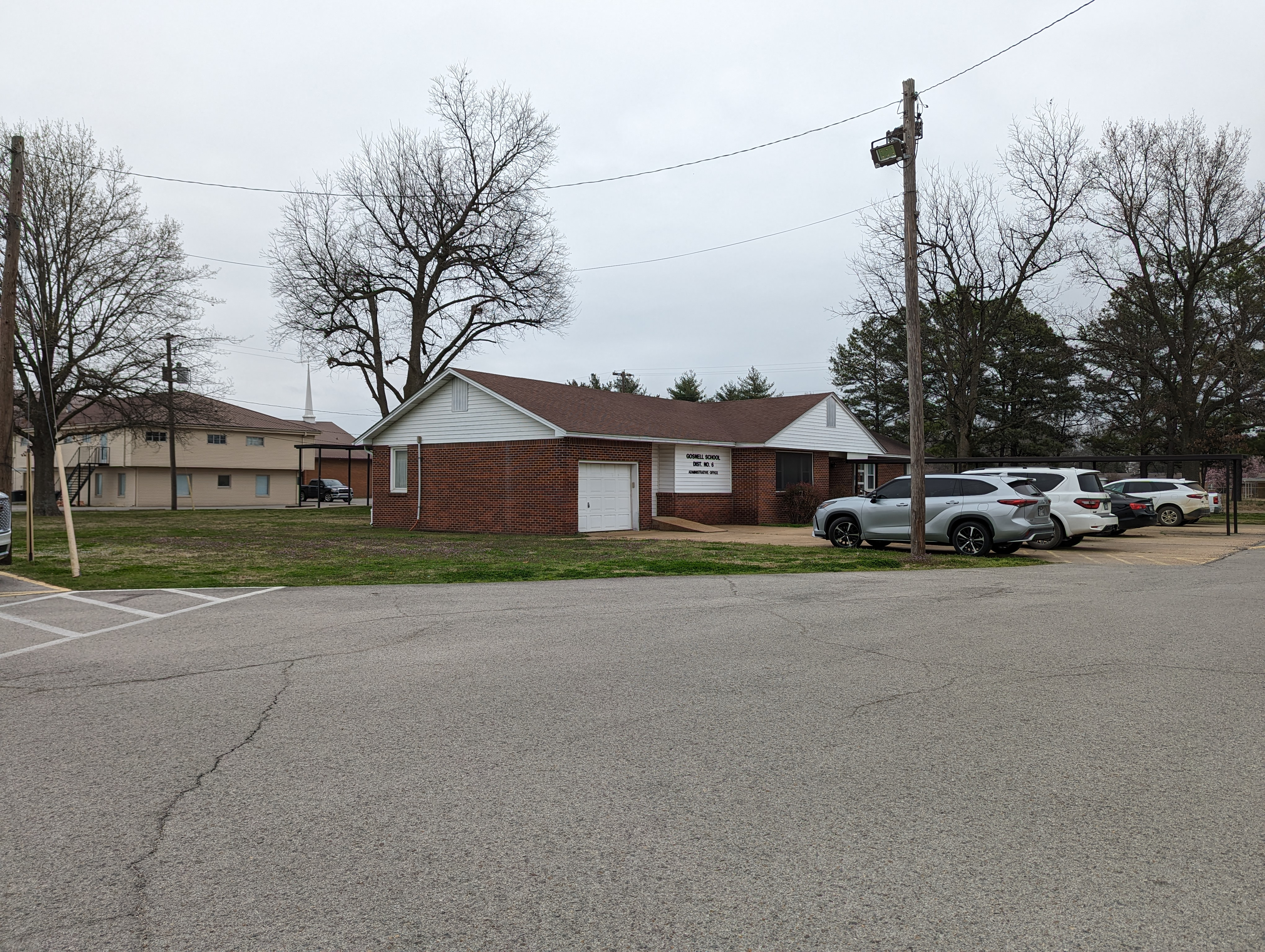
- Gosnell School District No. 6 Office

Location
- 600 AR 181; Blytheville, Arkansas 72315 United States

District information
- Grades: PK–12
- Established: 1920's
- Superintendent: Len Whitehead
- Accreditation: AdvancED
- Schools: 2
- NCES District ID: 0500029

Students and staff
- Students: 1,438
- Teachers: 109.95 (on FTE basis)
- Student–teacher ratio: 13.08
- Athletic conference: 4A Region 3 (2012–14)
- District mascot: Pirates
- Colors: Blue Gold

Other information
- Website: www.gosnellschool.net

Gosnell School District (officially: Gosnell School District No. 6) is a public school district based in Gosnell, Arkansas, United States. The Gosnell School District provides early childhood, elementary and secondary education for more than 1,400 prekindergarten through grade 12 students at its two facilities within Mississippi County, Arkansas.

It serves Gosnell and Dell as well as portions of Blytheville.

Gosnell School District is accredited by the Arkansas Department of Education (ADE) and AdvancED.

== History ==
The Gosnell school system was started prior to 1927. One of the earliest Superintendents, C.F. Cooper, oversaw most of the early growth of the school and the addition of a high school curriculum by 1930. By 1940, the school system had begun construction on their first gymnasium, and were on track to be the second or third school system in Mississippi County to have such a building.

In 1946, after the end of World War 2 and the closure of the neighboring Blytheville Army Airfield, the district moved its high school and most of its elementary school body to the former base's officer's club building. By 1953, the U.S. Air Force was looking to reactivate the facility as a permanent military installation and the district worked to move the school back to the old campus. Federal funding was used to help with the construction of new buildings.

On September 4, 1962, the district desegregated its schools. Twelve black students, who were previously bussed to a school in Blytheville, were allowed to attend Gosnell schools.

On July 1, 1984, the Dell School District merged into the Gosnell School District.

== Schools ==
- Gosnell High School—serving more than 650 students in grades 7 through 12.
- Gosnell Elementary School—serving more than 750 students in pre-kindergarten through grade 6.
