= Gosnell, Arkansas =

- City
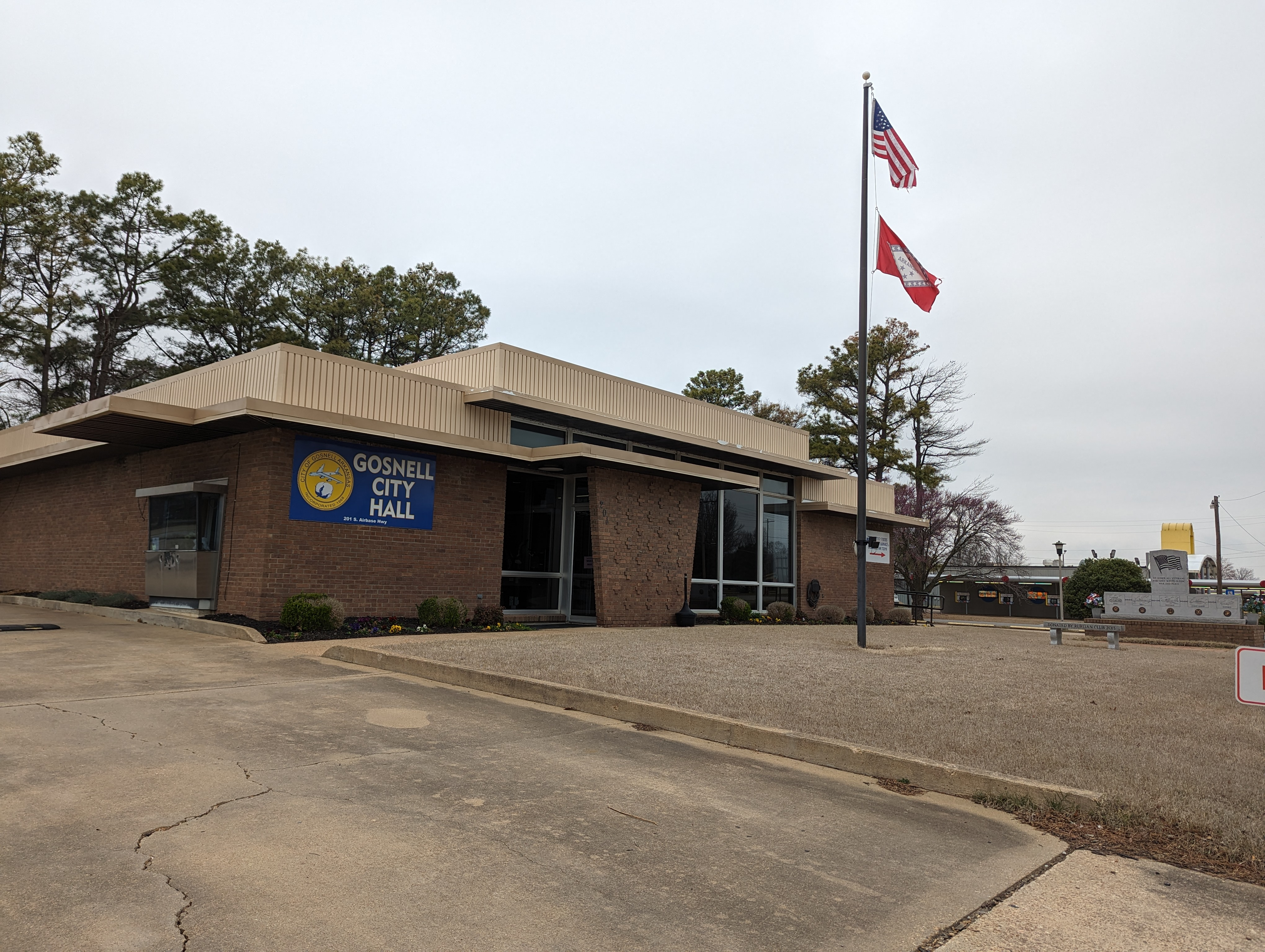
- Gosnell City Hall
- Motto(s): Moving Forward, Moving Strong
- Location in Mississippi County, Arkansas
- Coordinates: 35°57′32″N 89°58′41″W
- Country: United States
- State: Arkansas
- County: Mississippi
- First Settled: 1840s
- Organized: 1903
- Incorporated: March 12, 1968
- Named for: Lemuel Ward Gosnell (1854-1926)

Government
  - Mayor: Jason Taylor

Area
  - Total: 1.61 sq mi (4.18 km^{2})
  - Land: 1.61 sq mi (4.18 km^{2})
  - Water: 0 sq mi (0.00 km^{2})
- Elevation: 243 ft (74 m)

Population (2020)
  - Total: 2,910
  - Estimate (2025): 2,663 ▼
  - Density: 1,802.2/sq mi (695.84/km^{2})
- Time zone: UTC-6 (Central (CST))
  - Summer (DST): UTC-5 (CDT)
- ZIP codes: 72315, 72319
- Area code: 870
- FIPS code: 05-27700
- GNIS feature ID: 2403717
- Website: cityofgosnell.com

Gosnell is a city in northern Mississippi County, Arkansas, United States. The population was 2,910 at the 2020 census, down from 3,548 at the 2010 census.

== History ==
=== Pre-European Exploration ===
From 1350CE to 1700CE, the area was inhabited by a Late Mississippian Culture. Eaker Site, due east of modern Gosnell, contained a palisade, defensive trench, and a temple mound. While not confirmed, it is possible that the area was visited by members of Desoto's Expedition in 1540.

=== 19th Century ===
Following the Treaty of Fort Clark in 1808, a number of Creek, Shawnee, and Delaware families moved to the north end of Mississippi County, settling in and around future Gosnell and the Big Lake area. Most notable of these was Chickasawba, a Shawnee man who lived at Big Lake and sold honey to riverboat passengers at Barfield Landing in the early 1800s. According to local lore, he died in 1831 and was buried at the foot of the Late Mississippian mound south of modern Gosnell.

=== 20th Century ===
Much of the land between Blytheville and Big Lake was purchased in the late 1800s by Lemuel W. Gosnell, a merchant and farmer from Tennessee. In time, the community came to be named for him. L.W. Gosnell originally came to Mississippi County in 1876, working as a store clerk at Barfield Landing and Blytheville before becoming a partner in a general store in Blytheville.

==== Gosnell Post Office ====
The small community received its first railroad service sometime prior to 1903, after the Paragould and Southeastern Railroad extended its line from Hornersville, Missouri to Chickasawba, Arkansas (now eastern Blytheville). Following the railroad's construction past the western edge of the neighboring North Sawba community, a post office, named Gosnell, was established, with Mervyn Gosnell, the eldest son of L.W. Gosnell, serving as the first post master.

By the mid-1920's, Gosnell opened its own one room schoolhouse. For over a decade, the school was overseen by Superintendent C.F. Cooper, who oversaw the growth of the school and the addition of a high school curriculum by the time of his retirement in 1930. During the 1937 flood, the community hosted 300 homeless victims of the flood. It was reported that a large number of wild animals had fled from the eastern section of the county after a break in the levee resulted in flooding from the Mississippi River.

==== Blytheville Army Airfield ====
In 1942, the U.S. Army came to Mississippi County to survey for land to construct a pilot training school. By April of that year, they had notified 62 individual land owners in the North Sawba community and eastern Gosnell community that their land was being taken by the federal government. By June, Blytheville Army Airfield, a B-25 pilot training facility with three runways, was in operation. The school closed in 1946, and was converted into a suburb. The facility reopened in 1954 as Blytheville Air Force Base, a B-57 and later B-52 base.

==== Incorporation ====
In 1966, the residents of the Gosnell community organized to form a water utility company, the Gosnell Water Association.

Gosnell was incorporated as a first-class city on March 12, 1968. Gosnell's first mayor after incorporation was Andy Bevill. In December 2018, the citizen of Gosnell, Arkansas elected the first female mayor Teresa Walker.

== Geography ==
Gosnell is located in the Arkansas Delta in northern Mississippi County. It is bordered to the east by the city of Blytheville, the county seat. The Missouri state line is less than 3 miles (5 km) to the north. According to the United States Census Bureau, Gosnell has a total area of 1.6 square miles (4.1 km^{2}), all land.

Ecologically, Gosnell is located within the St. Francis Lowlands ecoregion near its border with the Northern Holocene Meander Belts ecoregion; both are subregions of the larger Mississippi Alluvial Plain. The St. Francis Lowlands are a flat region mostly covered with row crop agriculture today, though also containing sand blows and sunken lands remaining from the 1811–12 New Madrid earthquakes. Waterways have mostly been channelized, causing loss of aquatic and riparian wildlife habitat. The Big Lake National Wildlife Refuge, which preserves some of the bottomland hardwood forest typical of this ecoregion prior to development for row agriculture, lies 6 miles (10 km) west of Gosnell.

=== Historical sites ===
Leaving Blytheville on Chickasawba Street, one reaches Gosnell Road. Upon traveling 1.3 miles (2.1 km) one comes to the place of the famous Chickasawba Indian Mound 25 feet high and base circumference approximately 130 feet. This mound most likely served as either a Signal or a Temple Mound as no pottery or skeleton bones have been found here.

== Demographics ==
Historical population
| Census | Pop. | Note | %± |
|---|---|---|---|
| 1970 | 1,386 | | — |
| 1980 | 3,215 | | 132.0% |
| 1990 | 3,783 | | 17.7% |
| 2000 | 3,968 | | 4.9% |
| 2010 | 3,548 | | −10.6% |
| 2020 | 2,910 | | −18.0% |
| 2025 (est.) | 2,663 | ▼ | −8.5% |
U.S. Decennial Census; 2014 Estimate

=== 2020 census ===
As of the 2020 census, Gosnell had a population of 2,910. The median age was 32.4 years. 29.9% of residents were under the age of 18 and 12.5% of residents were 65 years of age or older. For every 100 females there were 92.6 males, and for every 100 females age 18 and over there were 87.2 males age 18 and over.

98.8% of residents lived in urban areas, while 1.2% lived in rural areas.

There were 1,053 households in Gosnell, of which 40.6% had children under the age of 18 living in them. Of all households, 41.7% were married-couple households, 19.4% were households with a male householder and no spouse or partner present, and 30.2% were households with a female householder and no spouse or partner present. About 25.3% of all households were made up of individuals and 8.0% had someone living alone who was 65 years of age or older.

There were 1,199 housing units, of which 12.2% were vacant. The homeowner vacancy rate was 3.6% and the rental vacancy rate was 14.2%.

Racial composition as of the 2020 census
| Race | Number | Percent |
|---|---|---|
| White | 2,011 | 69.1% |
| Black or African American | 617 | 21.2% |
| American Indian and Alaska Native | 11 | 0.4% |
| Asian | 23 | 0.8% |
| Native Hawaiian and Other Pacific Islander | 0 | 0.0% |
| Some other race | 82 | 2.8% |
| Two or more races | 166 | 5.7% |
| Hispanic or Latino (of any race) | 125 | 4.3% |

=== 2010 census ===
As of the census of 2010, there were 3,548 people, 1,387 households, and 951 families residing in the city. The racial makeup of the city was 72.9% White, 22.0% Black or African American, 0.4% Native American, 1.0% Asian, 1.6% from other races, and 2.1% from two or more races. Hispanic or Latino of any race were 3.5% of the population.

There were 1,238 households, out of which 48.1% had children under the age of 18 living with them, 45.9% were married couples living together, 23.2% had a female householder with no husband present, 7.8% had a male householder with no wife present, and 23.2% were non-families. 19.2% of all households were made up of individuals, and 4.8% had someone living alone who was 65 years of age or older. The average household size was 2.87 and the average family size was 3.26.

The median income for a household in the city was $43,722, and the median income for a family was $46,389. The per capita income for the city was $15,917.

=== 2000 census ===
As of the census of 2000, there were 3,968 people, 1,369 households, and 1,074 families residing in the city. The population density was 2,367.1 inhabitants per square mile (913.9/km^{2}). There were 1,578 housing units at an average density of 941.3 per square mile (363.4/km^{2}). The racial makeup of the city was 80.12% White, 15.15% Black or African American, 0.43% Native American, 1.01% Asian, 1.86% from other races, and 1.44% from two or more races. Hispanic or Latino of any race were 3.45% of the population.

There were 1,369 households, out of which 48.3% had children under the age of 18 living with them, 54.9% were married couples living together, 18.4% had a female householder with no husband present, and 21.5% were non-families. 17.5% of all households were made up of individuals, and 4.1% had someone living alone who was 65 years of age or older. The average household size was 2.90 and the average family size was 3.29.

In the city, the population was spread out, with 34.9% under the age of 18, 10.8% from 18 to 24, 32.0% from 25 to 44, 17.5% from 45 to 64, and 4.8% who were 65 years of age or older. The median age was 28 years. For every 100 females, there were 96.7 males. For every 100 females age 18 and over, there were 92.1 males.

The median income for a household in the city was $31,423, and the median income for a family was $37,176. Males had a median income of $30,995 versus $17,625 for females. The per capita income for the city was $13,371. About 15.5% of families and 17.1% of the population were below the poverty line, including 16.5% of those under age 18 and 31.4% of those age 65 or over.

== Economy ==
Gosnell used to depend on the nearby Blytheville/Eaker Air Force Base but since its closing in the early 1990s, the city has lost many of its inhabitants. The city is home to the Gosnell School District, which as of 2011 has an enrollment of 1438 K-12.

== Annual cultural events ==
Gosnell's Annual Cotton Festival is in October.

== Education ==
Public education is available to elementary and secondary school students at Gosnell School District, which leads to graduation from Gosnell High School. The district and high school mascot and athletic emblem is the Pirates, with the spirit colors of blue and gold.

== Government ==
- Mayor - Jason Taylor
- Ward 1
  - Position 1 - Steve Ledbetter
  - Position 2 - Stephen Murphy
- Ward 2
  - Position 1 - Johnny Pate
  - Position 2 - Daniel Holifield
- Ward 3
  - Position 1 - Dal Freeman
  - Position 2 - Chris Holifield

== State and federal representation ==
- Arkansas's 1st congressional district - Rick Crawford
- United States Senator - Mark Pryor

The United States Postal Service operates one post office in Gosnell.

== Climate ==
Gosnell has a humid subtropical climate (Köppen climate classification Cfa).

Totals and averages:

Climate data for Gosnell, Arkansas
| Month | Jan | Feb | Mar | Apr | May | Jun | Jul | Aug | Sep | Oct | Nov | Dec | Year |
|---|---|---|---|---|---|---|---|---|---|---|---|---|---|
| Mean daily maximum °F (°C) | 45 (7) | 50 (10) | 59 (15) | 70 (21) | 79 (26) | 88 (31) | 90 (32) | 90 (32) | 83 (28) | 72 (22) | 60 (16) | 48 (9) | 70 (21) |
| Mean daily minimum °F (°C) | 29 (−2) | 33 (1) | 41 (5) | 51 (11) | 61 (16) | 69 (21) | 72 (22) | 71 (22) | 63 (17) | 51 (11) | 42 (6) | 32 (0) | 51 (11) |
| Average precipitation inches (mm) | 3.67 (93) | 4.31 (109) | 4.54 (115) | 4.91 (125) | 5.23 (133) | 3.90 (99) | 4.02 (102) | 2.61 (66) | 2.88 (73) | 4.08 (104) | 4.70 (119) | 5.07 (129) | 49.92 (1,268) |

== Other information ==
=== Tornado activity ===
Gosnell area historical tornado activity is slightly above the Arkansas state average and is 220% greater than the overall U.S. average. On May 15, 1968, an F4 (maximum wind speeds 207-260 mph) tornado 5.6 miles (9.0 km) away from the Gosnell city center killed 35 people and injured 364 people and caused between $5,000 and $50,000 in damages.

On April 16, 1998, an F4 tornado 10.1 miles (16.3 km) away from the city center killed two people and injured twelve and caused $350,000 in damages.

=== Earthquake activity ===
Gosnell-area historical earthquake activity is significantly above the Arkansas state average. It is 91% greater than the overall U.S. average.

- On 3/25/1976 at 00:41:20, a magnitude 5.0 (4.9 MB, 5.0 LG, Class: Moderate, Intensity: VI - VII) earthquake occurred 30.3 miles away from the city center.
- On 5/4/1991 at 01:18:54, a magnitude 5.0 (4.4 MB, 4.6 LG, 5.0 LG, Depth: 3.1 mi) earthquake occurred 42.3 miles away from Gosnell center.
- On 4/27/1989 at 16:47:49, a magnitude 4.7 (4.6 MB, 4.7 LG, 4.3 LG, Class: Light, Intensity: IV - V) earthquake occurred 11.5 miles away from the city center.
- On 9/26/1990 at 13:18:51, a magnitude 5.0 (4.7 MB, 4.8 LG, 5.0 LG, Depth: 7.7 mi) earthquake occurred 86.6 miles away from the city center.
- On 3/25/1976 at 01:00:11, a magnitude 4.5 (4.1 MB, 4.5 LG) earthquake occurred 37.7 miles away from Gosnell center.
- On 11/29/1996 at 05:41:33, a magnitude 4.3 (4.3 LG, 4.1 LG, Depth: 12.6 mi) earthquake occurred 3.8 miles away from the city center.

Magnitude types: regional Lg-wave magnitude (LG), body-wave magnitude (MB)

=== Natural disasters ===
The number of natural disasters in Mississippi County (11) is near the US average (12).

Major disasters (Presidential) declared: 7

Emergencies declared: 4

Causes of natural disasters: Storms: 6, Floods: 5, Tornadoes: 4, Winter Storms: 4, Hurricane: 1 (Note: Some incidents may be assigned to more than one category).
