= Instillation abortion =

Late term abortion method

Background
- Abortion type: Surgical
- First use: 1934
- Last use: Usage has declined in U.S. since the 1970s.
- Gestation: 16-24 weeks

Usage
- United States: 0.9% (2003)

Instillation abortion is a rarely used method of late-term abortion, performed by injecting a solution into the uterus.

== Procedure ==
Instillation abortion is performed by injecting a chemical solution consisting of either saline, urea, or prostaglandin through the abdomen and into the amniotic sac. The cervix is dilated prior to the injection, and the chemical solution induces uterine contractions which expel the fetus. Sometimes a dilation and curettage procedure is necessary to remove any remaining fetal or placenta tissue.

Instillation methods can require hospitalization for 12 to 48 hours. In one study, when laminaria were used to dilate the cervix overnight, the time between injection and completion was reduced from 29 to 14 hours.

== Usage ==
The method of instillation abortion was first developed in 1934 by Eugen Aburel. It is most frequently used between the 16th and 24th week of pregnancy, but its rate of use has declined dramatically in recent years. In 1968, abortion by the instillation of saline solution accounted for 28% of those procedures performed legally in San Francisco, California. Intrauterine instillation (of all kinds) declined from 10.4% of all legal abortions in the U.S. in 1972 to 1.7% in 1985, falling to 0.8% of the total incidence of induced abortion in the United States during 2002, and 0.1% in 2007.

In a 1998 Guttmacher Institute survey, sent to hospitals in Ontario, Canada, 9% of those hospitals in the province which offered abortion services used saline instillations, 4% used urea, and 25% used prostaglandin. A 1998 study of facilities in Nigeria which provide abortion found that only 5% of the total number in the country use saline.

== Complications ==
Once in common practice, abortion by intrauterine instillation has fallen out of favor, due to its association with serious adverse effects and its replacement by procedures which require less time and cause less physical discomfort.

Saline is in general safer and more effective than the other intrauterine solutions because it is likely to work in one dose. Prostaglandin is fast-acting, but often requires a second injection, and carries more side effects, such as nausea, vomiting, and diarrhea.

Instillation of either saline or prostaglandin is associated with a higher risk of immediate complications than surgical D&C. Dilation and evacuation is also reported to be safer than instillation methods. One study found that the risk of complications associated with the injection of a combination of urea and prostaglandin into the amniotic fluid was 1.9 times that of D&E.

The rate of mortality reported in the United States between 1972 and 1981 was 9.6 per 100,000 for instillation methods. This is in comparison to rates of 4.9 per 100,000 for D&E and 60 per 100,000 for abortion by hysterotomy and hysterectomy.

There have been at least two documented cases of unsuccessful instillation abortions that resulted in live births.
