= Kermit Gosnell =

American serial killer (1941–2026)

- Gosnell's booking photo in 2011
- Born: Kermit Barron Gosnell; February 9, 1941; Philadelphia, Pennsylvania, U.S.
- Died: March 1, 2026 (aged 85); Huntingdon, Pennsylvania, U.S.
- Spouse: Pearl Gosnell
- Children: 6
- Status: Deceased
- Convictions: Federal; Conspiracy to distribute controlled substances (21 U.S.C. § 846); Distribution of controlled substances (21 U.S.C. § 841) (10 counts); Maintaining a place for the illegal distribution of controlled substances (21 U.S.C. § 856); Pennsylvania; First degree murder (3 counts); Involuntary manslaughter Performing an illegal late-term abortion (21 counts); Violating the 24-hour informed consent law (211 counts)
- Penalty: Federal; 30 years imprisonment Pennsylvania; Life imprisonment

Details
- Victims: 4 to possibly hundreds (Note: Gosnell was convicted of three murders of newborns and the involuntary manslaughter of a woman who died after an illegal abortion. Investigators recovered the remains of 45 fetuses from his clinic, including two or three viable ones. The Grand Jury Report and staff testimony indicate that the actual number of victims born alive and subsequently killed by Gosnell may reach hundreds, but most suspected cases could not be proven due to missing or destroyed records and limited physical evidence.)
- Span of crimes: 2006–2010
- Country: United States
- State: Pennsylvania
- Date apprehended: January 19, 2011
- Imprisoned at: SCI Huntingdon

Kermit Barron Gosnell (February 9, 1941 – March 1, 2026) was an American serial killer and abortion doctor. At his clinic in West Philadelphia, Gosnell provided illegal late-term abortions, committed post-labor infanticide after many live births, and ran a prescription pill mill which eventually attracted federal attention. Gosnell was convicted of the murders of three infants who were born alive after using drugs to induce labor, the manslaughter of one woman who died of an anesthetic overdose during an abortion procedure, and of several other abortion- and drug-related crimes. Staff at Gosnell's clinic testified that there were hundreds of infants born alive during abortion procedures and subsequently killed either by Gosnell himself or on Gosnell's orders by staff.

Gosnell, based in the Mantua neighborhood of Philadelphia, Pennsylvania, owned and operated the Women's Medical Society Clinic, a non-compliant abortion clinic located at 3801 Lancaster Avenue that was dubbed a "house of horrors" during his criminal trial. In a 2010 raid, authorities found the intact human remains of 47 fetuses and babies stored in bags and cartons, numerous of which were suspected and later confirmed to be victims of infanticide. In 2011, Gosnell, his wife Pearl, and eight employees were charged with a total of 32 felonies and 227 misdemeanors in connection with numerous deaths, illegal abortion procedures, and regulatory violations. Gosnell was also a prolific prescriber of numerous controlled substances, including OxyContin. Pearl and the eight employees pleaded guilty to various charges in 2011, while Gosnell pleaded not guilty and sought a jury trial.

In May 2013, Gosnell was convicted of first-degree murder in the deaths of three of the infants and involuntary manslaughter in the death of Karnamaya Mongar, an adult patient at the clinic who died following an abortion procedure. Gosnell was also convicted of 21 felony counts of illegal late-term abortion and 211 counts of violating Pennsylvania's 24-hour informed consent law. After the conviction, Gosnell waived his right to appeal in exchange for an agreement by prosecutors not to seek the death penalty. He was sentenced to life in prison without parole. Gosnell was sentenced to an additional 30 years in prison for federal drug charges. Gosnell was incarcerated at SCI Huntingdon. He died on March 1, 2026, at the age of 85, while still serving his sentence.

== Education and early career ==
Gosnell was born in Philadelphia, Pennsylvania, on February 9, 1941, as the only child of a gas station operator and a government clerk. He was a student at the city's Central High School, from which he graduated in 1959. Gosnell initially attended the University of Pennsylvania, and then graduated from Dickinson College with a bachelor's degree. He received his medical degree at the Thomas Jefferson University in 1966.

It has been reported that Gosnell spent four decades practicing medicine among the poor, including a teen-aid program and opening the Mantua Halfway House, a rehab clinic for drug addicts in the impoverished Mantua neighborhood of West Philadelphia. He became an early proponent of abortion rights in the 1960s and 1970s, and in 1972, he returned from a stint in New York City to open up an abortion clinic on Lancaster Avenue in Mantua. Gosnell told The Philadelphia Inquirer in October 1972: "As a physician, I am very concerned about the sanctity of life. But it is for this precise reason that I provide abortions for women who want and need them."

That same year, Gosnell also performed fifteen televised second-trimester abortions, using an experimental and dangerous "Super Coil" method invented by Harvey Karman in an event that was referred to as the "Mother's Day Massacre of 1972". The coils were inserted into the uterus, where they caused irritation leading to the expulsion of the fetus. However, complications from the procedure were reported by nine of the women, with three of these reporting severe complications. One woman had to undergo a hysterectomy.

The 1972 Inquirer article also said that Gosnell was a "respected man" in his community, and a finalist for the Junior Chamber of Commerce's "Young Philadelphian of the Year" because of his work directing the Mantua Halfway House. By the late 1980s, however, public records showed state tax liens were piling up against the halfway house, and the abortion clinic had a $41,000 federal tax lien.

Gosnell was married three times. His third wife, Pearl, had worked at the Women's Medical Society as a full-time medical assistant from 1982 until their marriage in 1990. They had two children. Gosnell had four other children from his two previous marriages. In covering his background, media commentators drew attention to the "incredibly diverse" portrayals of Gosnell, touching on both his community works – the creation of the halfway house and teen aid program – contrasted with portrayals of his practice as an abortion mill in which viable fetuses and babies were routinely killed following illegal late-term procedures.

== Abortion practice ==
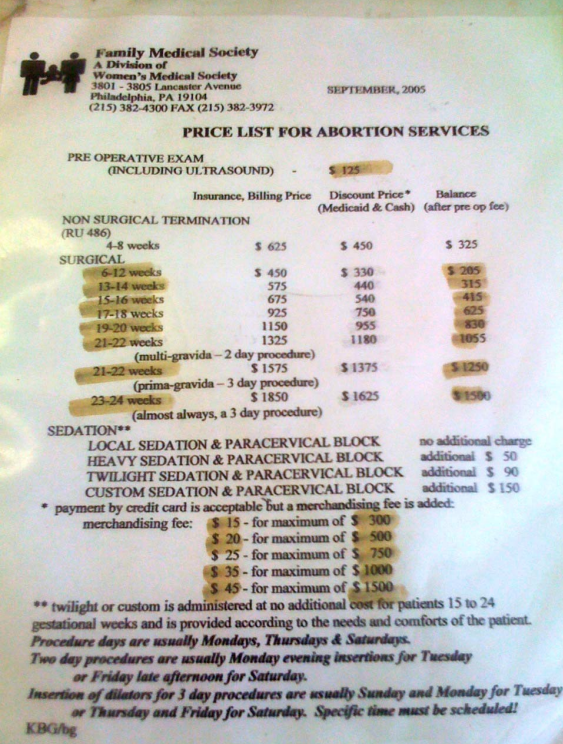
Document showing Gosnell's abortion prices

In 2011, Gosnell was reported to be well known in Philadelphia for providing abortions to poor minority and immigrant women. Gosnell was accused of racism on the basis that he separated white women from black women, giving white women a slightly cleaner room for their abortion procedures. It was also claimed that he charged $1,600 – 3,000 for each late-term abortion, and had made $10,000 –15,000 per day from the clinic.

Gosnell was also associated with clinics in Delaware and Louisiana. Atlantic Women's Services in Wilmington, Delaware, was Gosnell's place of work for one day each week. The owner of Atlantic Women's Services, Leroy Brinkley, also owned Delta Clinic of Baton Rouge, Louisiana, and facilitated the hiring of staff from there for Gosnell's operation in Philadelphia.

=== Known prior complaints ===
- 1989 and 1993 – Cited by Pennsylvania Department of Health for having no nurses in the recovery room.
- 1996 – Censured and fined in both Pennsylvania and New York for employing unlicensed personnel.
- Around 1997 – Pediatrician Dr. Donald Schwarz (the former head of adolescent services at the Children's Hospital of Philadelphia and, as of 2010, Philadelphia's health commissioner) testified in the 2010 hearing that around 1996–1997, he had hand-delivered a letter of complaint about Gosnell's practice to the Secretary of Health's office and stopped referring patients to the clinic, but received no response.
- 2000 – Civil lawsuit filed on behalf of the children of Semika Shaw, who had called the clinic the day after an abortion to report heavy bleeding, and died three days later of a perforated uterus and a bloodstream infection. The case alleged that Gosnell had failed to tell her to return to the clinic or seek emergency medical care. The case was settled out of court in 2002 for $900,000.
- Around 2001 – Gosnell claimed to be providing children's vaccines under a program administered by the Health Department's Division of Disease Control, but was repeatedly suspended for failing to maintain logs and for storing vaccines in unsanitary and inappropriate refrigerators, and at improper temperatures.
- December 2001 – Ex-employee Marcella Choung gave what a grand jury would later call "a detailed written complaint" to the Pennsylvania Department of State, one which she followed up with an interview in March 2002.
- 2006 – Civil lawsuit filed by patient but dismissed as out of time. The complaint was that Gosnell had been unable to complete an abortion, but then apparently failed or refused to call paramedics or other clinical emergency personnel after the patient had needed help. The patient reported, "I really felt like he was going to let me die."

In total, 46 known lawsuits were filed against Gosnell over some 32 years of his career. Observers claimed that there was a complete failure by Pennsylvania regulators who had overlooked other repeated concerns brought to their attention, including lack of trained staff, "barbaric" conditions, and a high level of illegal late-term abortions.

== Clinic raid and investigation ==
Gosnell's clinic, the Women's Medical Society, was raided on February 18, 2010, under a search warrant by investigators from the Federal Bureau of Investigation (FBI) and Pennsylvania State Police. The raid was the result of a months-long investigation by the Drug Enforcement Administration (DEA), the Philadelphia Police Department, and the state's Dangerous Drug-Offender Unit into suspected illegal drug prescription use at the practice. The investigation had also revealed the suspicious 2009 death of patient Karnamaya Mongar, a 41-year-old refugee from Bhutan, which had in turn brought to light further information about unsanitary operations, use of untrained staff (including teenagers), and use of powerful drugs without proper medical supervision and control. Thus, when the February 2010 raid took place, staff from Pennsylvania's departments of state and health also attended, as these issues were under their remit:

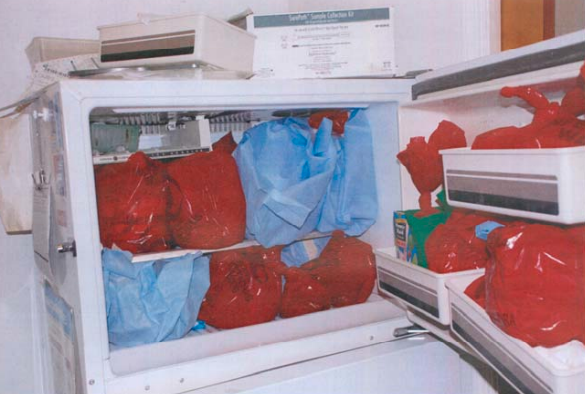
Grand Jury exhibit of bags containing fetal remains in Gosnell's clinic.

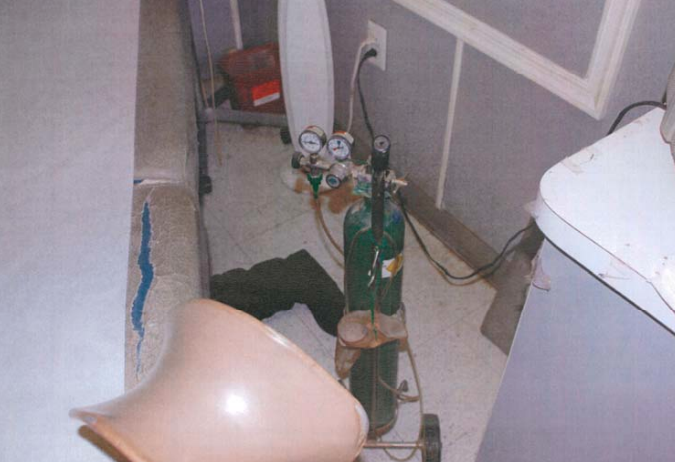
Grand Jury exhibit of unsanitary conditions inside Gosnell's clinic.

When the team members entered the clinic, they were appalled, describing it to the Grand Jury as 'filthy,' 'deplorable,' 'disgusting,' 'very unsanitary, very outdated, horrendous,' and 'by far, the worst' that these experienced investigators had ever encountered. There was blood on the floor. A stench of urine filled the air. A flea-infested cat was wandering through the facility, and there were cat feces on the stairs. Semi-conscious women scheduled for abortions were moaning in the waiting room or the recovery room, where they sat on dirty recliners covered with blood-stained blankets. All the women had been sedated by unlicensed staff— long before Gosnell arrived at the clinic— and staff members could not accurately state what medications or dosages they had administered to the waiting patients. Many of the medications in inventory were past their expiration dates… surgical procedure rooms were filthy and unsanitary… resembling 'a bad gas station restroom.' Instruments were not sterile. Equipment was rusty and outdated. Oxygen equipment was covered with dust, and had not been inspected. The same corroded suction tubing used for abortions was the only tubing available for oral airways if assistance for breathing was needed… [F]etal remains [were] haphazardly stored throughout the clinic– in bags, milk jugs, orange juice cartons, and even in cat-food containers... Gosnell admitted to Detective Wood that at least 10 to 20 percent... were probably older than 24 weeks [the legal limit]... In some instances, surgical incisions had been made at the base of the fetal skulls. The investigators found a row of jars containing just the severed feet of fetuses. In the basement, they discovered medical waste piled high. The intact 19-week fetus delivered by Mrs. Mongar three months earlier was in a freezer. In all, the remains of 45 fetuses were recovered ... at least two of them, and probably three, had been viable."

=== Facility conditions ===
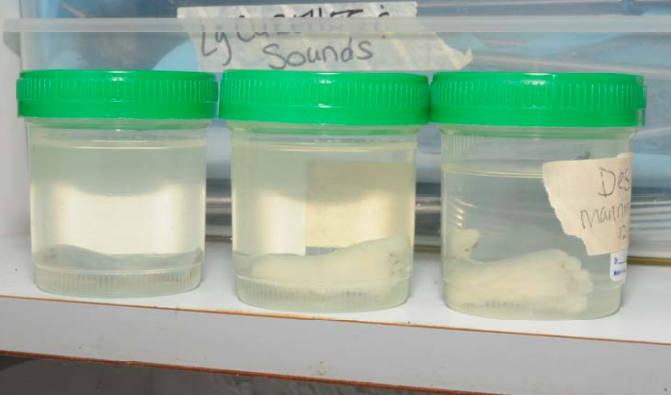
Grand jury exhibit of fetal feet that Gosnell stored in jars.

Investigators observed extreme unsanitary conditions throughout the clinic, including pervasive non-sterile environments, blood-stained instruments and furniture, and contamination by animal feces, urine, and other waste. The facility contained a strong odor of urine, and a flea-infested cat was allowed to roam freely. Surgical rooms were described as filthy, with non-sterile instruments, rusty and outdated equipment, and oxygen supplies that were dusty and uninspected. Medications were often expired, and disposable medical supplies were repeatedly reused. Life-saving and monitoring equipment, including blood pressure monitors, oximeters, and defibrillators, was reported to be broken or nonfunctional.

Fetal remains were found improperly stored throughout the facility, including in bags, milk jugs, juice cartons, and other containers, with some remains months old. Investigators discovered jars containing severed fetal feet, as well as large quantities of medical waste accumulated in the basement. In total, the remains of dozens of fetuses were recovered, including some considered potentially viable. In addition, significant safety hazards were identified, including blocked or padlocked emergency exits that could impede evacuation or emergency response.

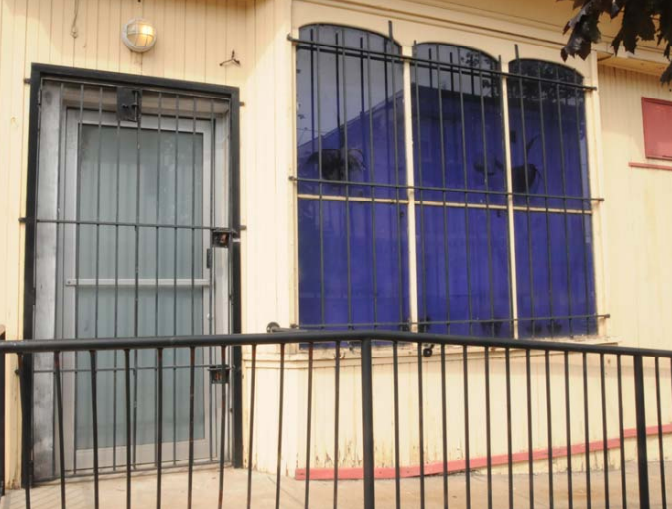
Grand jury exhibit of blocked emergency exit at Gosnell's clinic.

=== Staffing practices ===
The clinic routinely relied on unqualified and unlicensed staff to perform clinical duties, including administering anesthesia and assisting in procedures. Many employees had little or no relevant medical training, yet were expected to carry out tasks beyond their competence and sometimes misrepresented themselves as licensed clinicians. Testimony indicated that training for certain responsibilities could consist of only brief, informal instruction, and that staff were required to act independently in medical situations. The clinic often operated in the absence of a supervising physician, with employees reporting that they were discouraged from seeking guidance and expected to manage complications on their own.

The grand jury also identified deceptive and fraudulent staffing practices, including the temporary hiring of a nurse during an inspection to create the appearance of compliance, and the use of individuals posing as physicians while billing for services as if they were licensed.

=== Manipulation of records ===
Investigators found that medical and abortion records were frequently falsified, incomplete, or destroyed, hindering efforts to reconstruct events and pursue charges in many cases. Documentation of procedures, medications, and patient outcomes was often missing or inaccurate, including failures to record drug dosages or monitor patient condition. Staff were instructed to manipulate ultrasound measurements and reported gestational ages so that they would appear to fall within legal limits, regardless of the actual stage of pregnancy.

In addition, false or misleading statements were provided to investigators and medical personnel, including inaccurate accounts of patient treatment and the circumstances surrounding complications and deaths. These practices were identified as part of a broader pattern of concealment that obscured the clinic's operations and limited the ability of authorities to verify individual incidents. In total, the grand jury stated that at least several hundreds of incidents of infanticide likely occurred during late-term abortion procedures at Gosnell's clinic, but the overwhelming majority of them could not be proven due to destroyed records and lack of physical evidence.

=== Medical malpractice ===
Repeated instances of surgical malpractice were identified, including perforation of bodily organs and, on at least two occasions, patient deaths. Unsafe medical practices were also reported, including the use of sedation without adequate monitoring, recordkeeping, or individualized dosing, with some patients receiving multiple uncoordinated doses administered by different staff members.

Patients were frequently left unattended for extended periods, including after being given labor-inducing drugs, with some waiting hours for treatment or delivering without medical supervision while awaiting the physician's arrival. Testimony indicated that this lack of supervision was routine, and that patients often remained in the facility despite significant distress and without timely medical intervention.

Serious complications resulting from these practices included torn cervixes and colons, untreated retained fetal remains leading to severe infection, and punctured uteruses resulting in hemorrhage and hysterectomy. In one instance, a patient who experienced convulsions fell from an operating table and sustained a head injury, yet staff did not promptly seek emergency assistance.

Failures in emergency care and response were also identified, including the absence or nonfunction of critical equipment and delays in contacting emergency services. The death of Karnamaya Mongar followed repeated, unmonitored intravenous injections of Demerol, after which she ceased breathing; staff were unable to revive her, and paramedics were hindered by inaccurate information regarding the drugs administered.

=== Illegal drug operations ===
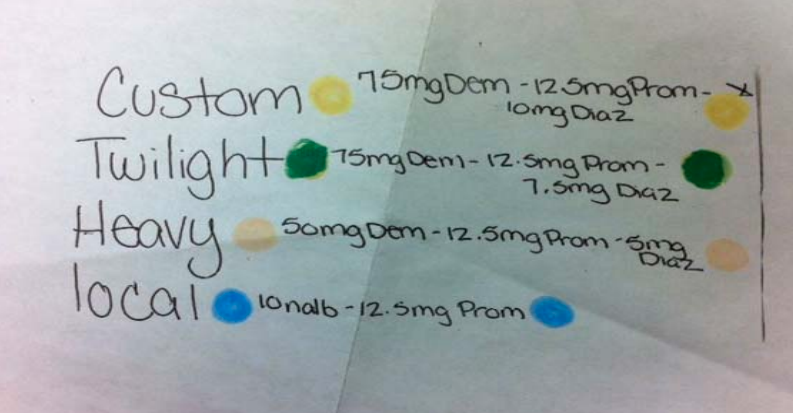
Grand jury exhibit of "drug cheat-sheet" Gosnell gave to untrained staff.

The United States Attorney for the Eastern District of Pennsylvania alleged that Gosnell's former office staff at Women's Medical Society ran a prescription "pill mill". From June 2008 through February 18, 2010, Gosnell engaged in a continuing criminal enterprise by writing and dispensing fraudulent prescriptions for thousands of pills of the frequently abused tablets OxyContin, Percocet, and Xanax, and the frequently abused syrups phenergan and promethazine with codeine. Authorities further alleged that Gosnell and his staff allowed customers to purchase multiple prescriptions under multiple names. For the first office visit, Gosnell charged $115, but around December 2009, he increased the initial office visit fee to $150. Staff at the clinic went from writing several hundred prescriptions for controlled substances per month filled at pharmacies in 2008 to over 2,300 filled at pharmacies in January 2010. Gosnell, with the assistance of his staff, distributed and dispensed more than 500,000 pills containing oxycodone; more than 400,000 pills containing alprazolam; and more than 19,000 ounces of cough syrup containing codeine.

=== Abortion and infanticide ===
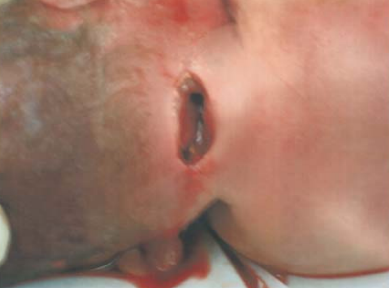
Grand Jury Exhibit of the "neck snip" Gosnell used during late-term abortions.

The grand jury reported that, during "abortion procedures," clinic staff routinely delivered living infants in the third trimester and then ensured their deaths after delivery. This was commonly done by severing the spinal cord with scissors, a practice staff referred to as “snipping” or the “neck snip.” According to the grand jury, many of these instances could not be individually prosecuted because records had been falsified, removed, or destroyed, though it stated that the number of such cases was in the “hundreds.”

Among the "few cases" where tangible evidence existed, the jury noted a boy aged 30 weeks at six pounds; a frozen body in a water container of "at least" 28 weeks; remains of at least one abortion of over 32 weeks for which an extra $1000 had been demanded; testimony of a baby heard to make noise; and a baby left "moving and breathing for at least 20 minutes" prior to "snipping". The jury heard testimony about "special" Sunday sessions, at which only Gosnell and his wife were present, which the jury suspected (and in some cases was able to corroborate) would include cases that were more advanced in time, or more disturbing.

=== Regulatory oversight ===
Reports stated that state officials had failed to visit or inspect Gosnell's practices since 1993. The grand jury report noted that the medical examiner of Delaware County alerted the Pennsylvania Department of Health that Gosnell had performed an illegal abortion on a 14-year-old who was thirty weeks pregnant; it is also claimed the Pennsylvania Department of Health did not act when they became aware of Gosnell's involvement in the death of Karnamaya Mongar.

Brenda Green, executive director of CHOICE, a nonprofit that connects the underinsured and uninsured with health services, told Katha Pollitt of The Nation that "it tried to report complaints from clients, but the department wouldn't accept them from a third party. Instead, the patients had to fill out a daunting five-page form, available only in English, that required them to reveal their identities upfront and be available to testify in Harrisburg. Even with CHOICE staffers there to help, only two women agreed to fill out the form, and both decided not to submit it. The Department of State and the Philadelphia Public Health Department also had ample warning of dire conditions and took no action."

In 2011, it was reported that none of Pennsylvania's 22 abortion clinics had been inspected by the government for more than fifteen years. Inspections (other than those triggered by complaints) had ceased under the governorship of Tom Ridge, a pro-choice Republican, as they were perceived to create a barrier to women seeking abortion services.

=== Other cases cited in the media ===
Examples of other cases cited in the media include:

- Girl age 15, accompanied by relative (1998): said to have told Gosnell she changed her mind about the abortion once inside the practice. Gosnell allegedly got upset, ripped off the patient's clothing and forcibly restrained her. The patient later stated that Gosnell told her: "This is the same care that I would give to my own daughter." She regained consciousness twelve hours later at her aunt's home, the abortion having been completed against her will.
- Woman age 28, five months pregnant (2001): Patient described the pain four days after abortion as being so bad she could barely walk. The patient described that upon returning to the clinic because of the pain, ultrasound showed fetal remains left inside her uterus, and that Gosnell suctioned these out without anesthesia. "I was just laying on the table and crying and I just asked the Lord to get me through it."
- Fifteen-year-old (undated): damages awarded in court upon a finding that Gosnell performed an abortion on a 15-year-old without parental permission.

=== License suspension ===
Gosnell's license to practice was suspended on February 22, 2010, and a plethora of findings was presented to a grand jury on May 4, 2010. Public discussion focused on claims of unsanitary conditions and other unacceptable conditions at the practices. Media reports stated that furniture and blankets were stained with blood, that freely roaming cats defecated wherever they pleased, and that non-sterilized equipment was used and reused on patients. According to the grand jury report, patients were given labor-inducing drugs by staff who had no medical training. Once labor began, the patient would be placed on a toilet. After the fetus fell into the toilet, it would be fished out so as not to clog the plumbing. In the recovery room, patients were seated on dirty recliners covered in blood-stained blankets. Prosecutors alleged that Gosnell had not been certified in either gynecology or obstetrics. The grand jury estimated that his practice "took in $10,000 to $15,000 a night" of additional income from his exceedingly high level of prescriptions.

=== Grand jury report ===
The grand jury concluded that the clinic operated as a corrupt organization within the meaning of racketeering law, citing a pattern of unlawful practices including the use of unlicensed staff, falsification of records, illegal abortion procedures, regular cases of infanticide, and violations of medical and abortion laws. It described these findings as reflecting a systemic disregard for legal requirements and patient safety rather than isolated incidents.

The grand jury also recommended specific regulatory and legislative reforms, including mandatory annual inspections of abortion facilities, stricter enforcement of licensing requirements, and improved systems for reporting and investigating complaints. It called for better coordination between oversight agencies and more thorough review processes, including cross-checking physician records and prior complaints. Additional recommendations included requiring qualified physicians to supervise certain procedures, strengthening oversight of medical waste disposal, and enacting new laws to criminalize impersonation of medical professionals. It further recommended changes to existing laws, including extending the statute of limitations for late-term abortion offenses and eliminating time limits for infanticide, as well as broader legislative review to address gaps in regulatory authority and enforcement.

The grand jury recommended a range of criminal charges against Kermit Gosnell, his wife, and several associates, including Lynda Williams, Adrienne Moton, Steven Massof, and Eileen O'Neill, as well as others such as Sherry West and Tina Baldwin. Recommended charges included first-degree murder in cases where infants were alleged to have been born alive, conspiracy to commit murder in connection with numerous additional alleged incidents, and solicitation to commit murder. Additional charges included violations of the Abortion Control Act, illegal late-term abortions, and drug-related offenses tied to the clinic's prescription practices. In connection with the death of Karnamaya Mongar, charges included third-degree murder and drug delivery resulting in death. Further counts included obstruction of justice, falsification and destruction of records, impersonation of medical professionals, abuse of corpses, and participation in a criminal enterprise.

== Apprehension ==
Gosnell was arrested on January 19, 2011, five days after the certification of the grand jury's report. He was charged with eight counts of murder. Prosecutors alleged that he killed seven babies born alive by severing their spinal cords with scissors, and that he was also responsible for the death in 2009 of Karnamaya Mongar. Gosnell's wife, Pearl, and eight other suspects were also arrested in connection with the case. The DEA, the FBI, and the Office of the Inspector General also sought a 23-count indictment charging Gosnell and seven members of his former staff with drug conspiracy relating to the practice's illegal prescriptions of highly addictive painkillers and sedatives outside of the usual course of professional practice and for no legitimate medical purpose.

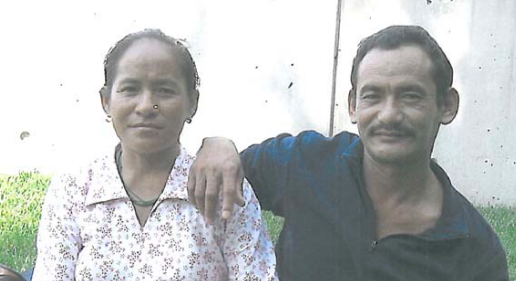
Karnamaya Mongar and her husband.

- The third-degree murder charge relates to Karnamaya Mongar. Mongar was a 41-year-old refugee from Bhutan, who had immigrated the same year (2009) she went to Gosnell's clinic. According to prosecutors, Gosnell's staff gave the 90-pound woman a lethal dose of anesthesia and painkillers during a 2009 abortion. During Gosnell's trial, a toxicologist testified to unsafe levels of drugs, and the lead of anesthesiology at the University of Pittsburgh Medical School testified that the dose received by her was "outrageous" and that most average adults "would have stopped breathing" if dosed in the manner described. Gosnell's lawyer asserted that Mongar had other drugs in her system that did not come from Gosnell's clinic, and that none of the infants were born alive. The claim was rejected by the grand jury, based upon expert testimony that "it was the overdose of Demerol, not some mystery pill, that killed Mrs. Mongar."
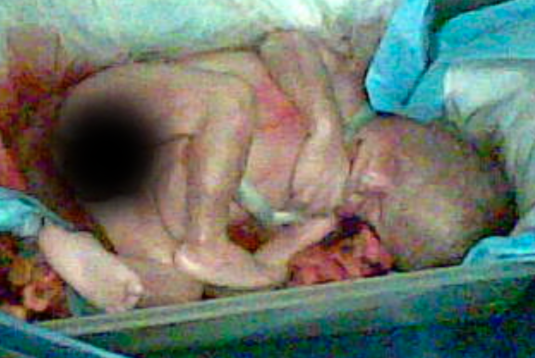
  Grand Jury Exhibit of "Baby Boy A," one of the three Gosnell was convicted of murdering.
- The seven other murder charges are all of first-degree murder; they relate to babies, whom staff have testified they saw move or cry after complete birth, and whose deaths are alleged to have resulted from subsequent lethal action. They arise because of the "born alive rule", a principle of common law in the United States, which stipulates that by default, for legal purposes, personhood arises— and therefore unlawful killing constituting murder becomes possible— immediately upon the victim's being born alive. Steven Massof, a clinic employee who pleaded guilty to similar charges in 2011, testified that he (Massof) had snipped the spines of more than 100 infants after they had been born alive, and that this was considered "standard procedure" at the clinic; a number of other employees had also testified to the same point. No physical evidence exists for five of the seven cases— charges are based on staff testimony and denied by Gosnell. A photograph exists of the sixth, who allegedly had a gestational age of 30 weeks, and the physical remains were obtained of the seventh. The grand jury report states that "A medical expert with 43 years of experience in performing abortions was appalled. This expert told us, 'I've never heard of it [cutting the spinal cord] being done during an abortion'."

The United States Attorney for the Eastern District of Pennsylvania also alleged that Gosnell's former office staff at Women's Medical Society ran a prescription "pill mill". From June 2008 through February 18, 2010, Gosnell allegedly engaged in a continuing criminal enterprise by writing and dispensing fraudulent prescriptions for thousands of pills of the frequently abused tablets OxyContin, Percocet, and Xanax, and the frequently abused syrups phenergan and promethazine with codeine. Authorities further alleged that Gosnell and his staff allowed customers to purchase multiple prescriptions under multiple names. For the first office visit, Gosnell allegedly charged $115, but around December 2009 he allegedly increased the initial office visit fee to $150. Staff at the clinic went from writing several hundred prescriptions for controlled substances per month filled at pharmacies in 2008 to over 2,300 filled at pharmacies in January 2010. Gosnell, with the assistance of his staff, is said to have distributed and dispensed more than 500,000 pills containing oxycodone; more than 400,000 pills containing alprazolam; and more than 19,000 ounces of cough syrup containing codeine.

Gosnell's lawyer stated that, "Everybody's made him the butcher, this, that and the other thing without any trial, without anything being exposed to the public and everybody's found him guilty, that's not right". He accused the government of a "lynching" and stated, "This is a targeted, elitist and racist prosecution of a doctor who's done nothing but give [back] to the poor and the people of West Philadelphia." Following his arrest, Gosnell claimed, "I'm very close to being destitute". However, this statement is contradicted by records showing that he and his wife owned at least seventeen properties across four states, including a million dollar house in Brigantine, New Jersey.

== Trial ==
In 2011, Gosnell, his wife Pearl, and eight other clinic employees were charged in the case. Eight, including Gosnell's wife, subsequently pleaded guilty, most of whom would testify against Gosnell, and three of these pleaded guilty to third-degree murder, carrying a 20- to 40-year term. A gag order was imposed on both defense and prosecution in April 2011 to bar them from talking to the media before the trial. In December 2011, Pearl pleaded guilty to performing illegal abortions, conspiracy, criminal conspiracy and corrupt organization; due to spousal privilege, she would not have to testify against Gosnell, although she could still go to prison. Pearl had testified to the grand jury that she alone assisted on Sundays, and that her role was to "help do the instruments" in the procedure room and to monitor patients in the recovery room. Another employee testified that she assisted with late-term abortions "on Sundays or days we were closed [to] do special cases."

As a result, the only employee to go on trial with Gosnell was Eileen O'Neill, who allegedly held herself out as a doctor at the clinic when she was not licensed. Her lawyer told jurors she never did so, and performed medical duties only under Gosnell's orders.

On March 18, 2013, opening statements were given in a Philadelphia court. On April 23, after the prosecution had rested its case, the judge dismissed three of the seven first-degree murder charges (the next day the judge reinstated charges related to one and dismissed another, explaining the wrong charge had been mistakenly dismissed), the one count of infanticide, and all five charges of abusing a corpse Gosnell had been charged with, as well as six of the nine charges of theft by deception faced by O'Neill. No formal ruling has yet been given for these dismissals. Media sources following the trial have suggested that there may have been insufficient evidence of post-procedure life to sustain charges in law. Although prosecutors had argued the movements were voluntary and therefore signs of life, it was argued that the evidence offered by prosecutors was equally capable of being interpreted in some or all of these as single autonomous post-mortem motor movements or spasms instead of clinical signs of life, and additionally that none of the seven were capable of being alive as all had been previously killed clinically in utero by means of drugs as part of the procedure. Also, although staff had used descriptions such as "jumping" and "screaming" in their testimony, Gosnell's defense noted that testimony had shown only single movements or breaths, stating that the testimony was not evidence of "the movements of a live child", and the medical examiner had also testified that tests could not determine whether or not any of the 47 fetuses found had been born alive due to tissue deterioration.

The remaining four first-degree murder charges could still have led to the death penalty. The third-degree murder charges in the death of Karnamaya Mongar, the racketeering charge, and over 200 charges related to multiple violations of abortion law were also left standing. Gosnell's defense attorney rested his case summarily without calling or questioning any witnesses, and without Gosnell taking the stand in his defense, leaving the defense case until final arguments (under US law, a defendant may choose not to take the stand; if so then the jury is instructed that no inference or assumption may be drawn from this). O'Neill also did not testify in her defense. The case went to jury deliberation on April 30, 2013.

=== Defendants, related charges, verdicts and sentencing ===
Gosnell was charged with seven counts of first-degree murder (reduced to four counts at trial) and one count of third-degree murder, as well as infanticide (dismissed at trial), five counts of abusing a corpse (all dismissed at trial), multiple counts of conspiracy, criminal solicitation, and violation of a state law that forbids abortions after the 24th week of pregnancy. The non-murder charges included 24 counts of violating Pennsylvania's Abortion Act by performing illegal third-trimester abortions, 227 counts of violating a 24-hour waiting-period requirement, failing to counsel patients, and racketeering. His co-defendants were:

- Pearl Mabel Gosnell, Kermit's wife, was charged with abortion at 24 or more weeks, conspiracy and participating in a corrupt organization. She pleaded guilty to these charges on December 13, 2011. Pearl Gosnell was sentenced to 7 to 23 months in prison.
- Eileen O'Neill of Phoenixville, was convicted of conspiracy charges and theft by deception.
- Steven Massof, a medical school graduate who lacked a license, pleaded guilty in November 2011 to two counts of third-degree murder for the deaths of two babies who had been born alive and was sentenced to six to 12 years in prison.
- Kareema Cross, who testified at the state trial she had seen at least ten babies breathe after being aborted who were then killed, pleaded guilty to federal drug charges over improper distribution of pain medicine from Gosnell's clinic.
- Adrienne Moton pleaded guilty to third-degree murder, admitting to cutting the neck of ten babies and to racketeering charges. She was sentenced to 11 and a half to 23 months in prison.
- Lynda Williams was convicted of two counts of third-degree murder and sentenced to 5 to 10 years for her crimes.
- Sherry West was convicted of third-degree murder and other charges, having admitted to administering the overdose that killed Karnamaya Mongar. She was sentenced to 5 to 10 years in prison.
- Madeline Joe, of Philadelphia, the clinic's office manager, pleaded guilty to conspiracy charges.
- Elizabeth Hampton, Gosnell's sister-in-law, admitted charges of perjury. She was sentenced to one year of probation.
- Tina Baldwin pleaded guilty to racketeering, conspiracy and corruption of a minor. She was sentenced to 30 months probation.

On May 13, 2013, the jury reported that they were deadlocked on two counts. After returning to deliberations, the jury convicted Gosnell of three counts of murder, one count of involuntary manslaughter, and over 200 lesser counts including infanticide and racketeering. He was found not guilty on one of the counts of murder. The murder charges Gosnell was convicted of concerned babies referred to as Baby Boy A (also known as Baby Abrams and as Adam), Baby C and Baby D.

On May 14, 2013, Gosnell struck a deal with prosecutors in which he agreed to waive all his appeal rights regarding his conviction on the day earlier. In exchange, prosecutors allowed Gosnell to be sentenced to life in prison without the possibility of parole. The following day, Gosnell was sentenced to three life terms.

=== Drug distribution trial ===
In December 2013, Gosnell was convicted of illegally distributing painkillers. He was charged with illegally distributing a "staggering" amount of painkillers such as Oxycontin, totaling hundreds of thousands of pills. Many of the drugs he distributed were later sold on the streets by drug dealers. Gosnell was sentenced to 30 years imprisonment for the crimes.

== Civil cases ==
The family of Karnamaya Mongar brought a wrongful death suit against Gosnell and sought to freeze his assets to prevent him from transferring them to other people to avoid paying. In September 2015, a judge in Philadelphia Common Pleas court awarded nearly $4 million in compensatory damages to Mongar's daughter, Yashoda Devi Gurung. However, reports that Gosnell had few assets by this time made it doubtful whether any of the money would be paid.

== Death ==
Gosnell died at a hospital in Huntingdon, Pennsylvania, on March 1, 2026, at the age of 85. His death was not reported until three weeks later, on March 23. (Note: Many sources mislabel his age as "83".)

== Impact and aftermath ==
=== Other bodies and persons claiming to have made reports ===
In April 2011 the University of Pennsylvania Health System claimed as early as 1999 that they had provided to authorities reports about botched procedures by Gosnell. The only case for which any reports were produced was that of Semika Shaw, a 22-year-old, who died at the University of Pennsylvania hospital as a result of bleeding and sepsis caused by a botched procedure by Gosnell. Gosnell's insurers settled a lawsuit with family members of Shaw for $900,000. The health system also claims other undocumented reports were made orally, for which they did not have records.

=== Regulatory and legislative impact ===
The Consumer Protection and Professional Licensure Committee of the Pennsylvania State Senate, led by Robert M. Tomlinson, began a hearing in February 2011 to look into the failure of the Pennsylvania Department of State — which is responsible for licensing doctors — to provide any oversight of Gosnell's activities. At the same time, the Public Health and Welfare Committee of the state Senate, chaired by Pat Vance, conducted hearings on the Pennsylvania State Health Department's failure to put a stop to Gosnell's activities.

In part as a result of the grand jury report on Gosnell, in late 2011, Pennsylvania passed a law, SB 732, that places abortion clinics under the same health and safety regulations as other outpatient surgical centers. Among those who supported the bill was Democrat Margo L. Davidson, whose cousin Semika Shaw died as a result of procedures done by Gosnell. Davidson specifically linked her support for the additional regulations to her cousin's death, which she attributed to poor medical practices.

In May 2013, as a result of the Kermit Gosnell case, Representative Joe Pitts (R-Pennsylvania), chair of the health-matters subcommittee of the United States House of Representatives' Energy and Commerce Committee, began an inquiry into states' oversight of abortion clinics.

In June 2013, the Republican-led U.S. House of Representatives passed the Pain-Capable Unborn Child Protection Act. Speaker of the House John Boehner said the bill was in response to Gosnell's convictions. The legislation was viewed as mostly symbolic, as it stood little chance of being approved by the then Democratic-led U.S. Senate.

=== Non-legislative actions resulting from the case ===
In February 2011, Governor Tom Corbett fired six employees and commenced action to fire eight others where, for legal or contractual reasons, more extensive dismissal procedures were required. These included Basil Merenda, the acting head of the Pennsylvania Department of State; Christine Dutton, the Department of Health's chief counsel (who, in reaction to being questioned why the department did not react to a death at Gosnell's clinic, said "people die"); and Stacy Mitchell, a deputy secretary in the health department (whom the grand jury cited as a key figure in the Health Department's indifference to, and non-regulation of, abortion clinics). Some of the people most connected by the grand jury report with the failure of the government to act, such as Janice Staloski, had retired by this point and so no action was taken against them.

=== Memorial ===
The remains of the 47 fetuses and infants found at Gosnell's clinic were buried at Laurel Hill Cemetery, though no headstone was used. In 2019, John and Loida McKeever installed a small memorial at the site, a statue of an angel. A sign around its neck reads: "In memory of the babies that were lost at 3801 Lancaster Avenue".

=== Fate of clinic's property ===
After Gosnell's arrest, trial, and conviction, the property of the Women's Medical Society clinic at 3801 Lancaster Avenue became a topic of contentious debate among residents of Philadelphia. Citizens were divided on whether the building should be destroyed, sold, or turned into a memorial. By 2019, the city had put the property up for sale at least four times, although it was never able to go up for auction during that time period. In 2017, a pregnancy care facility operated by AlphaCare, an religiously affiliated anti-abortion company, opened a location near the building. Shortly after this, it was revealed at a city civic meeting that AlphaCare also had also created plans to purchase the property on 3801 Lancaster Avenue as well.

In 2025, a Pennsylvania judge ruled in favor the nonprofit organization named reBuilding Blocks, granting them conservatorship of the property. Gosnell's son David Evans, who was also appointed power of attorney over Kermit Gosnell, did not object to the ruling. ReBuilding Blocks has committed to use their newly purchased property in order to rehabilitate the image of the city.

== Media coverage and public reactions ==
Gosnell's arrest has been the subject of much public comment and expressions of condemnation and shock by senior public figures of all parties. Philadelphia Mayor Michael Nutter (D-PA) said, "I think it's quite clear that, if these allegations are true, we've had a monster living in our midst" while vowing to watch the city's remaining abortion clinics more closely. Outgoing Governor Ed Rendell (D-PA) criticized Department of Health officials saying, "I was flabbergasted to learn that the Department of Health did not think their authority to protect public health extended to clinics offering abortion services", while incoming Governor Tom Corbett (R-PA) stated through a spokesperson that he was "appalled at the inaction on the part of the Health Department and the Department of State," and Philadelphia District Attorney R. Seth Williams said, "My comprehension of the English language can't adequately describe the barbaric nature of Dr. Gosnell [...] Pennsylvania is not a third-world country [...] There were several oversight agencies that stumbled upon and should have shut down Kermit Gosnell long ago."

Gosnell also practiced in other states, including Delaware. In January 2011, Delaware Attorney General Beau Biden (D-Delaware) promised a wide-ranging investigation into the abortions Gosnell performed in Delaware saying; "I'm disturbed by the allegations that were handed up by the grand jury in Philadelphia".

Vicki Saporta, President of the National Abortion Federation, defended the organization's failure to report by noting that although Gosnell had been rejected for membership following inspection, because his clinics did not meet appropriate standards of care "they'd cleaned the place up and hired an RN [registered nurse] for our visit. We only saw first-trimester procedures." She added that, "Unfortunately, some women don't know where to turn. You sometimes have substandard providers preying on low-income women who don't know that they do have other (safe) options." A spokesperson for Planned Parenthood in Southeastern Pennsylvania, condemned Gosnell, saying, "We would condemn any physician who does not follow the law or endangers anyone's health [...] All women should have access to high-quality care when they are vulnerable and facing difficult decisions." Dayle Steinberg, CEO of Planned Parenthood of Southeastern Pennsylvania, says she knew that Gosnell had provided abortions in Philadelphia for many years, but says she hadn't heard of any problems at his clinic until the allegations surfaced. She has been quoted as stating that "when Gosnell was in practice, women would sometimes come to Planned Parenthood for services after first visiting Gosnell's West Philadelphia clinic, and would complain to staff about the conditions there. We would always encourage them to report it to the Department of Health." She clarified that "when Gosnell was arrested, I asked our staff if anyone had ever heard of him, and clinic staff members reported that a few women over the years said they were concerned about the uncleanliness of his facility and came to Planned Parenthood instead [...] if we had heard anything remotely like the conditions that have since come to light about Gosnell's facility, of course we would have alerted the state and other authorities".

Kermit Gosnell himself gave an interview to Fox affiliate WTXF-TV in February 2011, in which he stated that:

- "I expect to be vindicated."
- [Regarding the allegations] "to tell you the truth, I hope to read them in 3 to 6 months [...] because I have lived through negative publicity before."
- "It's something I have personally experienced several times before where my surgical abilities have been challenged, where the choices that I have made have not always been perfect."
- "If you are not making mistakes, you are not really attempting to do something, so I think that my patients are aware that I do my very best by them."
- "The standard that I share with everyone [...] is that I provide the same care that I would provide my own daughter I feel."
- "I have a story to tell [...] my work to the community is of value."
- Gosnell reported that he received outpouring of support: "I have gotten wonderful little messages of support [telling me to have] confidence that [the fact that] I am a good person will prevail."

=== Criticism of media coverage ===
A perception had built up among some journalists and anti-abortion groups that there had been a reluctance to report on the trial among mainstream media. In an April 11, 2013, opinion column for USA Today, Kirsten Powers wrote: "A Lexis-Nexis search shows none of the news shows on the three major national television networks has mentioned the Gosnell trial in the last three months", and that national press coverage was represented by a Wall Street Journal columnist who "hijacked" a segment on Meet the Press, a single page A-17 story on the first day of the trial by The New York Times, and no original coverage by The Washington Post. While Powers is credited by some for drawing media coverage to the Gosnell trial, Dave Weigel at Slate.com reported it was conservatives' aggressive use of social media, especially Twitter, that "goaded" the press into covering the trial. According to Weigel, Troy Newman, president of the Kansas-based anti-abortion Operation Rescue, had organized a Twitter campaign using "#Gosnell" to break the "Gosnell Media Blackout."

Key to that social media campaign was a picture of rows of empty media seats in the Gosnell courtroom taken by Calkins Media columnist J.D. Mullane. Mullane told Weigel he was struck by the absence of media at the trial, and took out his iPhone and snapped the picture, tweeting it later that night. "Mullane retweeted the photo a few more times, with different captions, because it had been packed into a snowball (of criticism)" which included Powers' column for USA Today, Weigel wrote. The empty seats photograph was used by anti-abortion activists to show "proof" of media dereliction. Weigel wrote: "It worked. An estimated 106,000 #Gosnell tweets later, on April 15, Mullane reported that major networks and newspapers had sent their reporters to cover the trial—Fox News, the New York Times, the Washington Post."

Writing for The Washington Post, Melinda Henneberger responded that "we didn't write more because the only abortion story most outlets ever cover in the news pages is every single threat or perceived threat to abortion rights. In fact, that is so fixed a view of what constitutes coverage of that issue that it's genuinely hard, I think, for many journalists to see a story outside that paradigm as news. That's not so much a conscious decision as a reflex, but the effect is one-sided coverage". Explaining why some of her colleagues did not report on the story, Henneberger wrote, "One colleague viewed Gosnell's alleged atrocities as a local crime story, though I can't think of another mass murder, with hundreds of victims, that we ever saw that way. Another said it was just too lurid, though that didn't keep us from covering Jeffrey Dahmer, or that aspiring cannibal at the NYPD." Writing for Bloomberg View, Jeffrey Goldberg said that this story "upsets a particular narrative about the reality of certain types of abortion, and that reality isn't something some pro-choice absolutists want to discuss".

The Los Angeles Times, The Atlantic, Slate, and Time all published opinion columns where the writer thought the incident was not getting as much media coverage as it deserved. Megan McArdle explains that she didn't cover it because it made her ill, but also how being pro-choice influenced writers saying "most of us tend to be less interested in sick-making stories if the sick-making was done by 'our side,'" saying, "this story should have been covered much more than it was — covered as a national policy issue, not a 'local crime story.'" Martin Baron, The Washington Post's executive editor, claims he wasn't aware of the story until Thursday, April 11, 2013, when readers began emailing him about it, saying "I wish I could be conscious of all stories everywhere, but I can't be". They ultimately decided that, in fact, the story warranted attention because of "the seriousness and scope of the alleged crimes and because this was a case that resonated in policy arguments and national politics", adding "In retrospect, we regret not having staffed the trial sooner. But, as you know, we don't have unlimited resources, and [...] there is a lot of competition for our staff's attention". He insisted that "we never decide what to cover for ideological reasons, no matter what critics might claim. Accusations of ideological motives are easy to make, even if they're not supported by the facts". The New York Times also acknowledged the lack of coverage and reported on the online campaign and subsequent increase in coverage of the case. While Powers' piece clearly sparked debate among journalists, Katherine Bindley also highlights contrasting views, as does Paul Farhi. A column on Salon.com questioned whether the Gosnell case was an example of liberal media bias, saying that conservative media and politicians had also given little attention to the story until April 2013.

In April 2013, 71 other Members of Congress joined Congresswoman Marsha Blackburn in a letter condemning the media "blackout" on the Gosnell trial.

== Film and documentary ==
In early 2014, filmmakers Ann McElhinney, Phelim McAleer, and Magdalena Segieda announced they would be producing a true crime drama film of the Gosnell crimes. Nick Searcy would direct, and John Sullivan would serve as executive producer. The title for the film is Gosnell: America's Biggest Serial Killer. The producers raised money for production of the movie on the crowdfunding site Indiegogo, receiving $2.3 million from backers. Andrew Klavan was hired to be the screenwriter for the movie. Earl Billings portrays Gosnell, and Dean Cain takes the part of Detective James Wood.

The producers announced on June 26, 2018, that they had signed a distribution deal for the movie, which opened in about 750 theaters on October 12, 2018.

As well, the filmmakers wrote a book titled, Gosnell: The Untold Story of America's Most Prolific Serial Killer.

=== Documentary ===
A documentary about the case titled "3801 Lancaster: American Tragedy" was released in 2013, with clips from it shown on media outlets such as CNN. The documentary was made by David Altrogge and won Best Short Film at the 2013 Justice Film Festival.

== See also ==
- List of serial killers in the United States
- Live births following abortion attempts

=== Other ===
- Patient abuse
- Medical harm
- Medical malpractice
- Whistleblowing
- Infanticide
- Neonaticide

== Bibliography ==
- Greasley, Kate (2013). "The pearl of the 'Pro-Life' movement? Reflections on the Kermit Gosnell controversy". Journal of Medical Ethics. 40 (6): 419–423. doi:10.1136/medethics-2013-101551. PMID 23845928.
- Williams, R Seth (January 14, 2011), Report of the Grand Jury, Court of Common Pleas, First Judicial District of Pennsylvania (PDF), Court of Common Pleas of Pennsylvania, archived from the original (PDF) on April 15, 2013. (also found at https://www.supremecourt.gov/opinions/URLs_Cited/OT2015/15-274/15-274-1.pdf)
