= Arkansas Highway 325 =

State highway in Arkansas, United States

Highway 325

Route information
- Maintained by ArDOT
- Length: 5.00 mi (8.05 km)

Major junctions
- South end: US 61, Osceola
- North end: AR 158

Location
- Country: United States
- State: Arkansas
- Counties: Mississippi

Highway system
- Arkansas Highway System; Interstate; US; State; Business; Spurs; Suffixed; Scenic; Heritage
| ← AR 324 | → AR 326 |

Arkansas Highway 325 (AR 325, Hwy. 325) is a north–south state highway in Mississippi County, Arkansas. The route of 5.00 miles (8.05 km) runs from US 61 in Osceola north through the city to terminate at Highway 158.

== Route description ==
AR 325 runs north from US 61 south of Osceola. The route intersects Highway 239 before it forms a concurrency with US 61 for 0.7 miles (1.1 km). Highway 325 passes the Hale Avenue Historic District, City Hall, and the Florida Brothers Building all listed on the National Register of Historic Places. The route also passes within a block of the Mississippi County Courthouse.

Another overlap begins westbound with AR 119 for another 0.7 miles (1.1 km). AR 325 then runs due north to terminate at AR 158 at the New Salem Cemetery east of Interstate 55 and Victoria.

== Major intersections ==
The entire route is in Mississippi County.

| Location | mi | km | Destinations | Notes |
|---|---|---|---|---|
| Osceola | 0.00 | 0.00 | US 61 | southern terminus |
| Osceola | 0.45 | 0.72 | AR 239 | |
| Osceola | 1.50 | 2.41 | US 61 east (Keiser Avenue) | |
| Osceola | See US 61 and AR 119 | | | |
| Osceola | 0.00 | 0.00 | AR 119 south (Semmes Avenue) | |
| | 3.50 | 5.63 | AR 158 | northern terminus |
1.000 mi = 1.609 km; 1.000 km = 0.621 mi: Concurrency terminus

== See also ==
- List of state highways in Arkansas
