= Mississippi County Courthouse =

Mississippi County Courthouse may refer to:

- Mississippi County Courthouse (Blytheville, Arkansas)
- Mississippi County Courthouse (Osceola, Arkansas)
- Mississippi County Courthouse in Charleston, Missouri
