= National Register of Historic Places listings in Mississippi County, Arkansas =

Location of Mississippi County in Arkansas

This is a list of the National Register of Historic Places listings in Mississippi County, Arkansas.

This is intended to be a complete list of the properties and districts on the National Register of Historic Places in Mississippi County, Arkansas, United States.

There are 44 properties and districts listed on the National Register in the county, including 2 National Historic Landmark. Another two properties were once listed but have been removed.

Contents: Counties in Arkansas
- Arkansas
- Ashley
- Baxter
- Benton
- Boone
- Bradley
- Calhoun
- Carroll
- Chicot
- Clark
- Clay
- Cleburne
- Cleveland
- Columbia
- Conway
- Craighead
- Crawford
- Crittenden
- Cross
- Dallas
- Desha
- Drew
- Faulkner
- Franklin
- Fulton
- Garland
- Grant
- Greene
- Hempstead
- Hot Spring
- Howard
- Independence
- Izard
- Jackson
- Jefferson
- Johnson
- Lafayette
- Lawrence
- Lee
- Lincoln
- Little River
- Logan
- Lonoke
- Madison
- Marion
- Miller
- Mississippi
- Monroe
- Montgomery
- Nevada
- Newton
- Ouachita
- Perry
- Phillips
- Pike
- Poinsett
- Polk
- Pope
- Prairie
- Pulaski (Little Rock)
- Randolph
- St. Francis
- Saline
- Scott
- Searcy
- Sebastian
- Sevier
- Sharp
- Stone
- Union
- Van Buren
- Washington
- White
- Woodruff
- Yell

This National Park Service list is complete through NPS recent listings posted August 21, 2026.

== Current listings ==
	Name on the Register	Image	Date listed	Location	City or town	Description
1	Bank of Osceola	Bank of Osceola	August 6, 1987 (#87001352)	207 E. Hale St. 35°42′10″N 89°58′00″W	Osceola	
2	Blytheville Air Force Base Capehart Housing Historic District	Blytheville Air Force Base Capehart Housing Historic District	September 28, 2015 (#15000628)	Roughly bounded by Village Ave., Northside, Cypress Dr., Hemlock, Westminster, Apricot, Azalea & Pigeon Sts. 35°57′58″N 89°57′43″W	Blytheville	Large collection of 1960's three and four bedroom duplexes built to public housing code. Used by Blytheville Air Force Base to house officers and their families.
3	Blytheville Air Force Base Strategic Air Command (SAC) Alert and Weapons Storage Areas Historic District	Blytheville Air Force Base Strategic Air Command (SAC) Alert and Weapons Storage Areas Historic District	January 26, 2018 (#100001999)	4701 Memorial Drive; 35°57′33″N 89°57′47″W	Blytheville	Facility used by SAC to stage nuclear armed B-52s for launch against the Soviet Union during the Cold War. As of 2023, Alert Facility is undergoing restoration to become primary exhibit for a museum.
4	Blytheville Commercial Historic District	Blytheville Commercial Historic District	May 24, 2006 (#06000421)	Main St. between 5th and Franklin Sts. and Ash St. between 5th and 2nd Sts. 35°55′44″N 89°54′20″W	Blytheville	
5	Blytheville Greyhound Bus Station	Blytheville Greyhound Bus Station	August 17, 1987 (#87000447)	109 N. 5th St. 35°55′41″N 89°54′30″W	Blytheville	
6	Blytheville, Leachville and Arkansas Southern Railroad Depot-Leachville	Blytheville, Leachville and Arkansas Southern Railroad Depot-Leachville	June 11, 1992 (#92000612)	Northeastern corner of the junction of 2nd and McNamee Sts. 35°56′15″N 90°15′33″W	Leachville	
7	Burdette School Complex Historic District		October 28, 2001 (#01001174)	153 E. Park Ln. 35°48′47″N 89°56′13″W	Burdette	burned, Sep 20, 2015
8	Chickasawba Mound (3M55)	Chickasawba Mound (3M55)	November 16, 1984 (#84000217)	North of the junction of Highway 151 and Chickasawba Ave. 35°55′54″N 89°55′50″W	Blytheville	
9	City Hall	City Hall	August 6, 1987 (#87001350)	316 W. Hale St. 35°42′10″N 89°58′15″W	Osceola	
10	Delta Valley & Southern Railway Locomotive #50		January 24, 2007 (#06001263)	U.S. Route 61 at the Delta Valley and Southern Railway crossing 35°33′15″N 90°05′03″W	Delpro	Last known location Oklahoma City, Oklahoma, May 2009
11	Dyess Colony Center	Dyess Colony Center	January 1, 1976 (#76000435)	Highway 297; 35°35′29″N 90°12′46″W	Dyess	
12	Eaker Site	Eaker Site	November 25, 1992 (#91001048)	Northwest of the former landfill at Eaker Air Force Base; 35°57′48″N 89°56′04″W	Blytheville	
13	Farm No. 266—Johnny Cash Boyhood Home	Farm No. 266—Johnny Cash Boyhood Home	May 2, 2018 (#100002000)	4791 W. County Road 924; 35°35′51″N 90°14′42″W	Dyess	Home from age 3 through high school of Johnny Cash, part of a New Deal program.
14	Florida Brothers Building	Florida Brothers Building	August 6, 1987 (#87001355)	319 W. Hale St. 35°42′09″N 89°58′15″W	Osceola	
15	Garden Point Cemetery	Garden Point Cemetery	May 24, 2006 (#06000415)	4682 W. Highway 140; 35°42′08″N 90°14′17″W	Etowah	
16	Hale Avenue Historic District	Hale Avenue Historic District	September 14, 1987 (#87001349)	Roughly bounded by Hale Ave., Poplar St., Ford Ave., and Walnut St.; also roughly 107-111 W. Hale Ave. and 101-109 N. Walnut St.; also the 100 and 200 blocks of W. Hale Ave., the 100 and 200 blocks of E. Hale Ave., and the 100 block of N. Poplar St. 35°42′09″N 89°58′10″W	Osceola	Second and third sets of addresses represent boundary increases of September 2, 2003 and August 1, 2008
17	Herman Davis Memorial	Herman Davis Memorial	April 7, 1995 (#95000379)	Northeastern corner of the junction of Baltimore Avenue (Highway 18B) and Highway 18; 35°52′23″N 90°09′57″W	Manila	
18	Jonesboro, Lake City & Eastern Railroad Depot	Jonesboro, Lake City & Eastern Railroad Depot	March 8, 1997 (#97000206)	Northwestern corner of the junction of S. Dewey and Baltimore Avenue (Highway 18B); 35°52′43″N 90°10′00″W	Manila	
19	Jonesboro, Lake City & Eastern Railroad Steam Locomotive #34 and Associated Rolling Stock	Jonesboro, Lake City & Eastern Railroad Steam Locomotive #34 and Associated Rolling Stock	September 15, 2022 (#100008168)	Southwest of jct. of AR 158 and Park Ave. 35°45′23″N 90°03′21″W	Victoria	
20	Keiser School	Keiser School	October 8, 1992 (#92001342)	Southeastern corner of the junction of Main and School Sts. 35°40′26″N 90°05′42″W	Keiser	
21	Keiser Water Tower	Keiser Water Tower	January 24, 2007 (#06001283)	Junction of Water and E. Main Sts. 35°40′39″N 90°05′50″W	Keiser	
22	Kress Building	Kress Building	June 13, 1997 (#97000555)	210 W. Main St. 35°55′40″N 89°53′37″W	Blytheville	
23	Minaret Manor	Minaret Manor	January 24, 2017 (#100000554)	844 W. Semmes; 35°42′23″N 89°58′51″W	Osceola	Also referred to as: Cox-Florida Mansion
24	Mississippi County Courthouse	Mississippi County Courthouse	December 13, 1978 (#78000612)	Hale and Poplar Aves. 35°42′11″N 89°58′09″W	Osceola	
25	Mississippi County Courthouse, Chickasawba District	Mississippi County Courthouse, Chickasawba District	December 6, 1996 (#96001411)	200 W. Walnut St. 35°55′44″N 89°54′17″W	Blytheville	
26	Nodena Site	Nodena Site	October 15, 1966 (#66000201)	Address Restricted	Wilson	An archeological site which is the type site for the Nodena culture. Possibly visited by Spanish explorer Hernando de Soto in 1542
27	Old Bell Telephone Building	Old Bell Telephone Building	August 6, 1987 (#87001353)	100 block of Ash St. 35°42′12″N 89°57′59″W	Osceola	
28	Osceola Times Building	Osceola Times Building	August 6, 1987 (#87001351)	112 N. Poplar St. 35°42′11″N 89°58′07″W	Osceola	
29	Planters Bank Building	Planters Bank Building	August 6, 1987 (#87001354)	200 E. Hale St. 35°42′09″N 89°58′01″W	Osceola	
30	Sherman Mound and Village		February 1, 2018 (#100002062)	Address Restricted	Osceola	
31	Three States Lumber Company Mill Powerhouse	Three States Lumber Company Mill Powerhouse	October 28, 2001 (#01001175)	Old Mill Rd. 35°49′00″N 89°56′24″W	Burdette	
32	Chris Tompkins House	Chris Tompkins House	October 28, 2001 (#01001176)	144 South Oak Dr. 35°48′57″N 89°56′19″W	Burdette	
33	United States Highway 61 Arch	United States Highway 61 Arch	October 28, 2001 (#01001177)	U.S. Route 61; 35°59′58″N 89°53′54″W	Blytheville	Extends into Pemiscot County, Missouri
34	Violet Cemetery	Violet Cemetery	October 6, 2004 (#04001108)	Area bounded by W. Johnson Ave., Semmes Ave., and Pecan St. 35°42′22″N 89°58′01″W	Osceola	
35	West Main Street Residential Historic District	West Main Street Residential Historic District	August 5, 2010 (#10000521)	W. Main St. between B and 6th St. and Division; 35°55′39″N 89°55′08″W	Blytheville	
36	Widner-Magers Farm Historic District	Widner-Magers Farm Historic District	January 29, 2007 (#06001325)	3398 Highway 181; 35°52′41″N 90°02′38″W	Dell	
37	Edward Samuel Wildy Barn	Edward Samuel Wildy Barn	January 15, 2004 (#03001382)	1198 S. Highway 136; 35°43′07″N 90°14′33″W	Etowah	Barn felled by high winds in 2015. Silo and windmill remain.
38	Wilson Commercial Historic District	Wilson Commercial Historic District	September 23, 2016 (#16000651)	Roughly bounded by Union Ave., S. Jefferson, Madison, Adams & 2nd Sts. 35°34′07″N 90°02′35″W	Wilson	
39	Wilson Community House	Wilson Community House	June 2, 2015 (#15000285)	10 Lake Dr. 35°34′14″N 90°02′28″W	Wilson	
40	Wilson High School Gymnasium	Wilson High School Gymnasium	May 27, 2015 (#15000286)	Main & Lee Sts. 35°33′53″N 90°03′03″W	Wilson	
41	Wilson Motor Company		January 24, 2019 (#100003332)	42 Cortez Kennedy Ave. 35°33′57″N 90°02′50″W	Wilson	Structure no longer exists, 9/2020.
42	Wilson Residential Historic District	Wilson Residential Historic District	September 21, 2016 (#16000652)	4737, 4785, 4877 & 5101 US 61; 35°35′02″N 90°02′00″W	Wilson	
43	Yarbro Overpass		May 10, 2022 (#100007721)	US 61 over Union Pacific Railroad; 35°58′39″N 89°54′20″W	Yarbro	
44	Zebree Homestead		May 2, 1975 (#75000398)	Section 28, T16N, R9E, in the Big Lake National Wildlife Refuge; 35°59′05″N 90°07′48″W	Buckeye	Mississippian village site. Located along the ditch at the refuge's western boundary; extends as far east as the old bed of the Little River

== Former listings ==
	Name on the Register	Image	Date listed	Date removed	Location	City or town	Description
1	First Baptist Church		September 7, 1995 (#95001083)	September 14, 2005	513 S. Pecan St.	Osceola	Delisted due to significant alterations. Subsequently demolished
2	Mississippi County Jail	Mississippi County Jail	August 6, 1987 (#87001356)	January 24, 2017	300 S. Poplar St. 35°42′06″N 89°58′09″W	Osceola	demolished Feb 25, 2016

== See also ==
- List of National Historic Landmarks in Arkansas
- National Register of Historic Places listings in Arkansas
