= Planters Bank Building =

Planters Bank Building may refer to:

- Planters Bank Building (Osceola, Arkansas), listed on the National Register of Historic Places in Mississippi County, Arkansas
- Planters Bank Building (Jefferson, Texas), listed on the National Register of Historic Places in Marion County, Texas
