= Keiser Water Tower =

- U.S. National Register of Historic Places
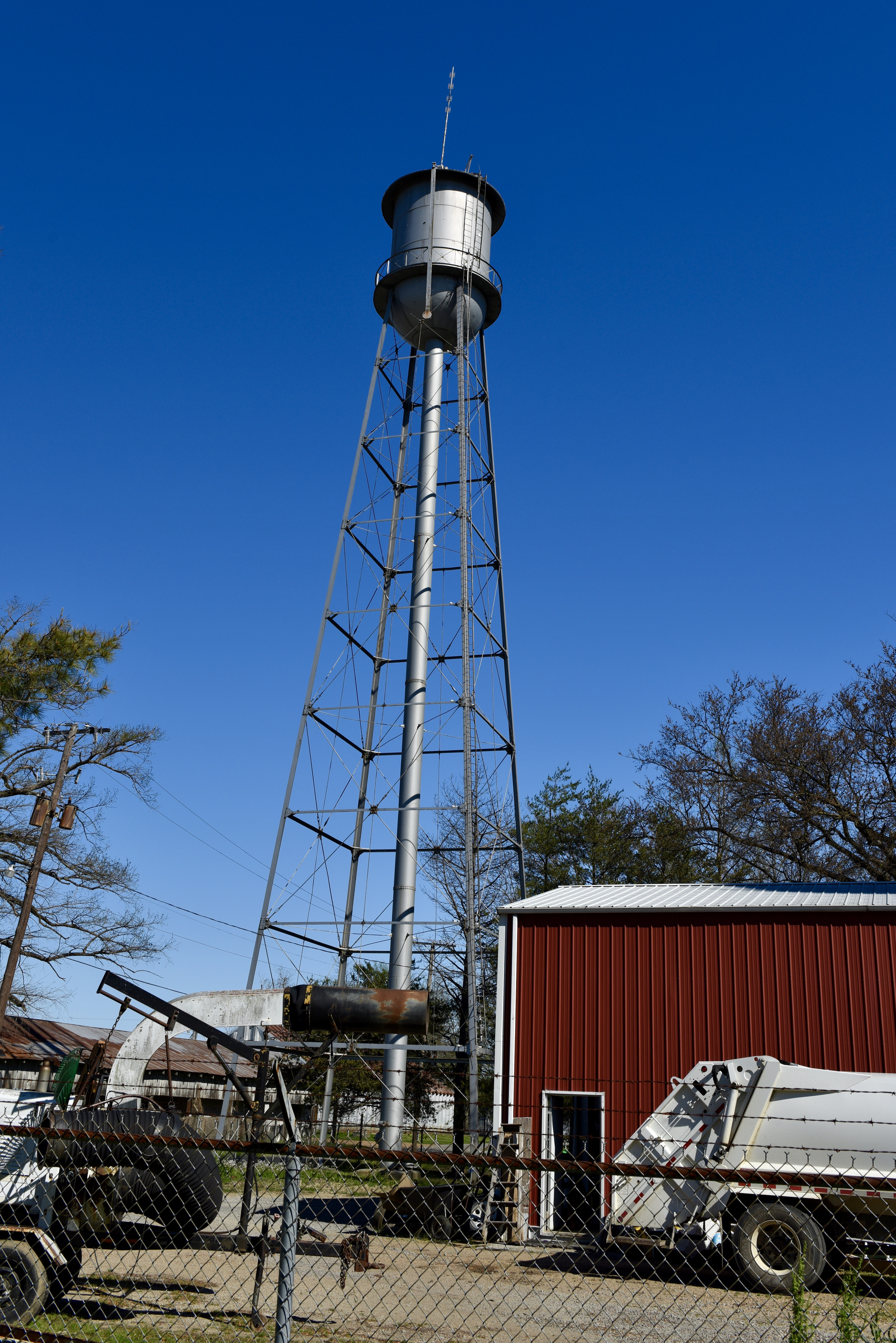

- Location within Arkansas Location within the United States
- Location: Jct. of the Water and E. Main Sts., Keiser, Arkansas
- Coordinates: 35°40′39″N 90°5′50″W
- Area: less than one acre
- Built: 1936
- MPS: New Deal Recovery Efforts in Arkansas MPS
- NRHP reference No.: 06001283
- Added to NRHP: January 24, 2007

The Keiser Water Tower is a historic waterworks facility at Water and East Main Street in Keiser, Arkansas. It is an open metal structure, several stories high, with a roughly cylindrical tank at the top, and a rising through the center to provide water to the tank. A ladder providing access to the tank is fixed to one of the legs, and there is a circular catwalk with railing around the tank. The structure was built in 1936 with funding from the Public Works Administration, and is one of the few Depression-era structures left in the small community.

The water tower was listed on the National Register of Historic Places in 2007.

== See also ==
- National Register of Historic Places listings in Mississippi County, Arkansas
