= Chris Tompkins House =

Historic house in Arkansas, United States

- U.S. National Register of Historic Places
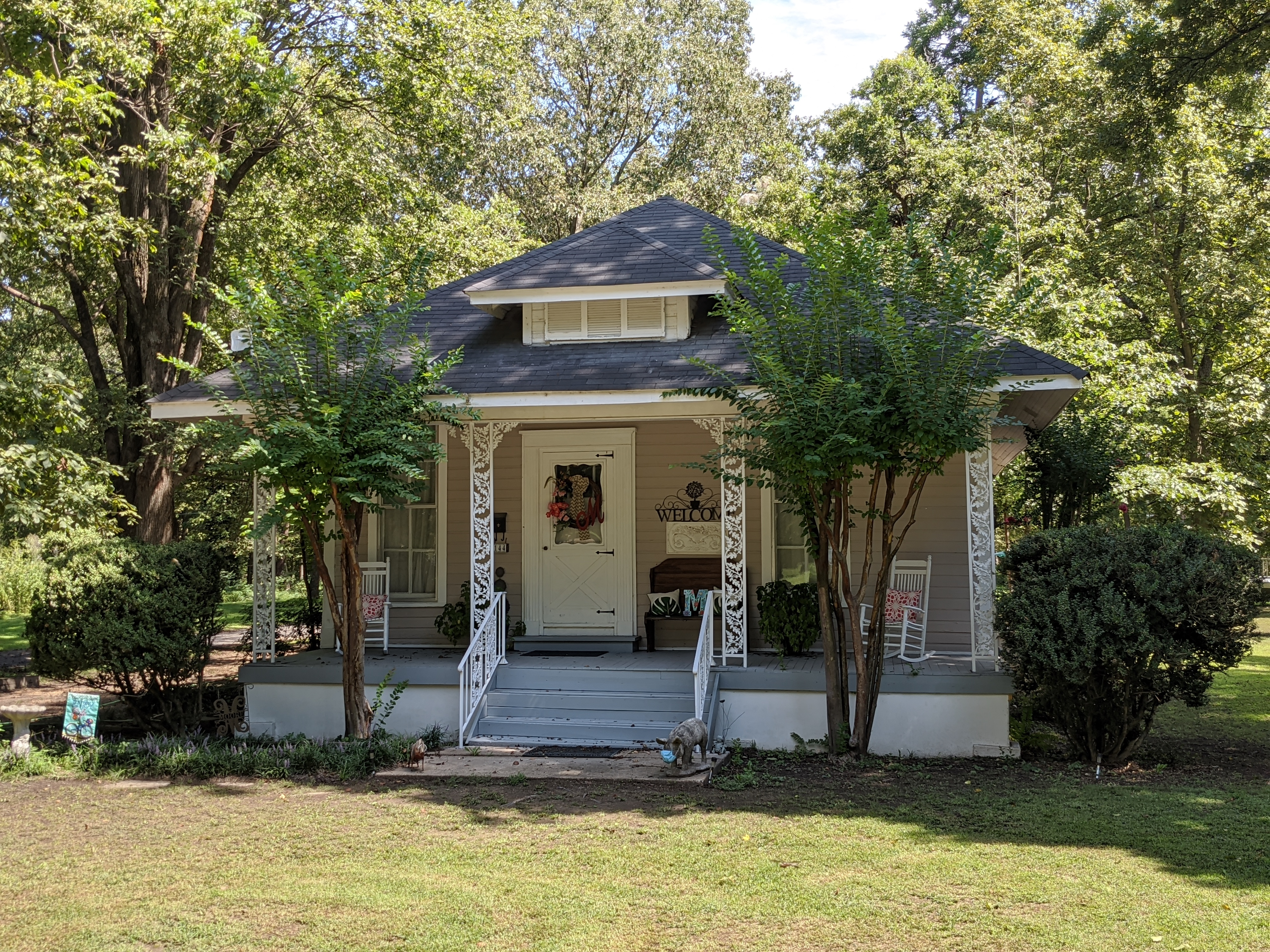

- Location within Arkansas Location within the United States
- Location: 144 South Oak Dr. Burdette, Arkansas
- Coordinates: 35°48′57″N 89°56′19″W
- Area: less than one acre
- Built: 1903
- Built by: Three States Lumber Company
- Architectural style: Bungalow/craftsman
- NRHP reference No.: 01001176
- Added to NRHP: October 28, 2001

The Chris Tompkins House is a historic house at 144 South Oak Drive in Burdette, Arkansas. It is a single story wood-frame structure, with a broadly overhanging hip roof and dormer. A porch with wrought iron railing extends across the front of the house, and a carport, added in 1938, is on the north side. The house was built in 1903 by the Three States Lumber Company, a major lumber operator in the early decades of the 20th century in Mississippi County, as a residence for mid-level managers. Burdette was essentially a company town at the time, and this is one of two houses from the period to survive.

The house was listed on the National Register of Historic Places in 2001.

== See also ==
- National Register of Historic Places listings in Mississippi County, Arkansas
