= Burdette School Complex Historic District =

Historic district in Arkansas, United States

- U.S. National Register of Historic Places
- U.S. Historic district
- Location within Arkansas Location within the United States
- Location: 153 E. Park Ln., Burdette, Arkansas
- Coordinates: 35°48′47″N 89°56′13″W
- Area: 9 acres (3.6 ha)
- Built: 1922
- Built by: Works Progress Administration, Harrison Construction Company
- Architectural style: Tudor Revival, Prairie School, et al.
- NRHP reference No.: 01001174
- Added to NRHP: October 28, 2001

The Burdette School Complex is a collection of historic school buildings at 153 East Park Lane in Burdette, Arkansas. It consists of six buildings, five of which were built between 1922 and 1948. The oldest is a stuccoed Prairie Style structure with a hip roof. Also of note is a red brick building built in 1939 with funding from the Works Progress Administration, and the gymnasium, which consists of three Quonset huts with a false front. The complex is regionally distinctive in that none of its buildings have been significantly altered or removed.

The complex was listed on the National Register of Historic Places in 2001.

== See also ==
- National Register of Historic Places listings in Mississippi County, Arkansas
