= Bank of Osceola =

- U.S. National Register of Historic Places
- U.S. Historic district – Contributing property
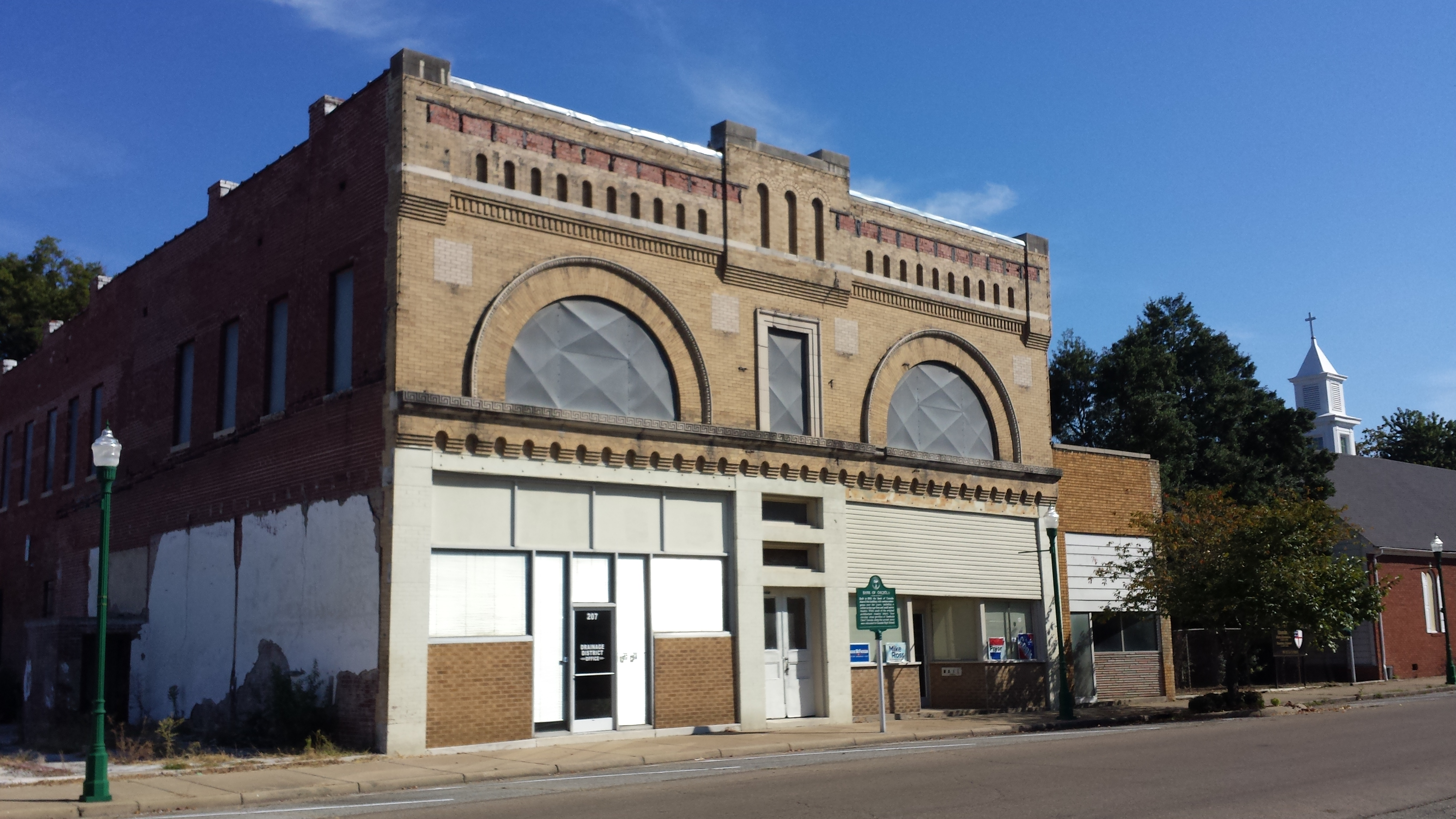

- Location within Arkansas Location within the United States
- Location: 207 E. Hale St., Osceola, Arkansas
- Coordinates: 35°42′10″N 89°58′0″W
- Area: less than one acre
- Built: 1909
- Part of: Hale Avenue Historic District (ID08000722)
- MPS: Osceola MRA
- NRHP reference No.: 87001352

Significant dates
- Added to NRHP: August 6, 1987
- Designated CP: August 1, 2008

The Bank of Osceola is a historic bank building at 207 East Hale Street in Osceola, Arkansas. It is a two-story brick structure, built in 1909 during Osceola's major building boom. Decorative brick and stone elements on its facade include a cornice between the two floors, with a scalloped effect. This band once included panels said to depict the Native American chief Osceola; these are now on a building at the local high school. The building housed a bank and grocery store when opened, with law and real-estate offices above. The decorative elements inside include elaborate woodwork and mosaic-tile floors.

The building was listed on the National Register of Historic Places in 1987.

== See also ==
- National Register of Historic Places listings in Mississippi County, Arkansas
