= Violet Cemetery =

Historic cemetery in Arkansas, United States

- U.S. National Register of Historic Places
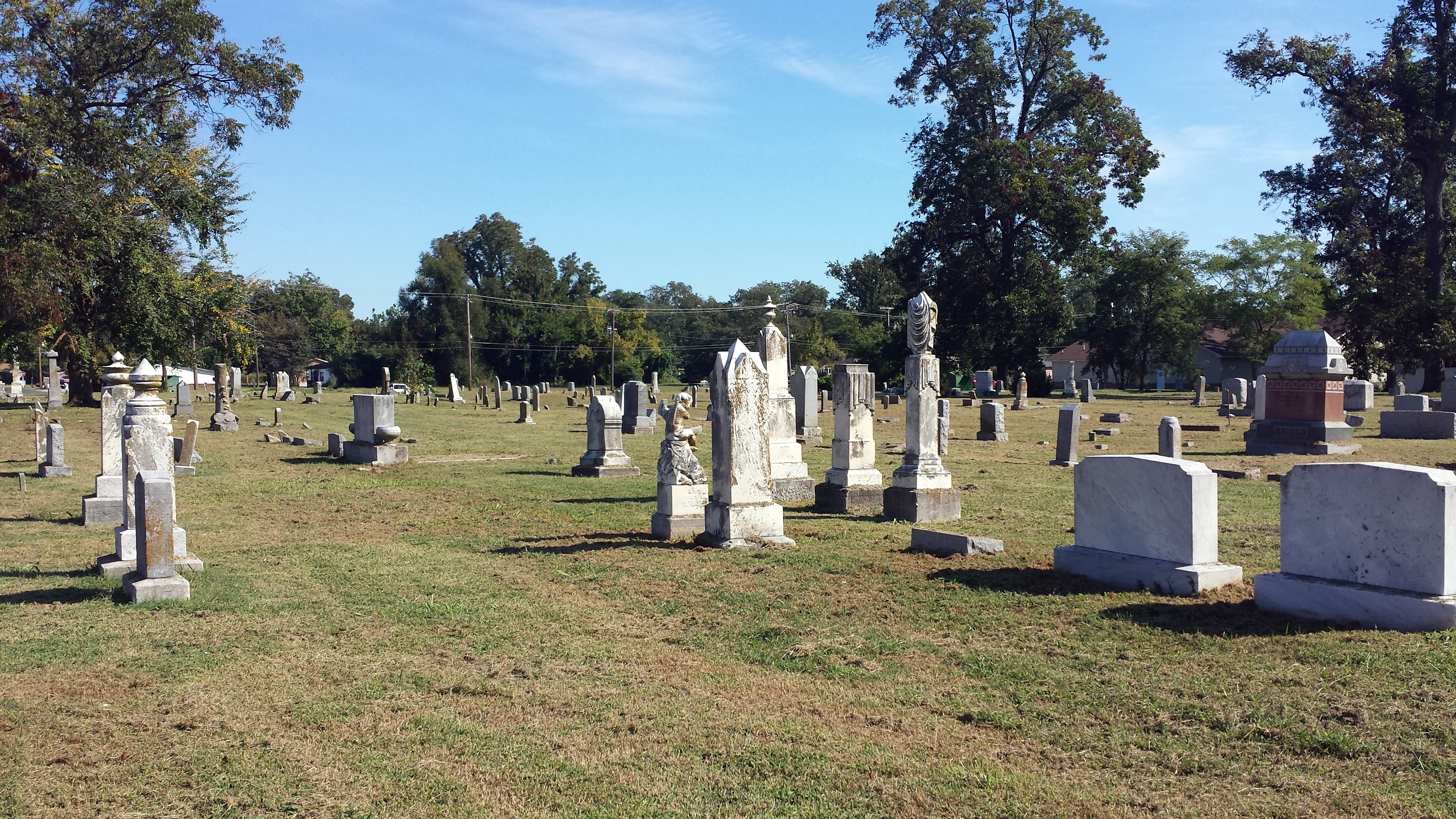
- Violet Cemetery

- Location within Arkansas Location within the United States
- Location: Area bounded by W. Johnson Ave., Semmes Ave., Pecan St., Osceola, Arkansas
- Coordinates: 35.7044°N 89.9667°W
- Area: 2.5 acres (1.0 ha)
- Built: 1831
- NRHP reference No.: 04001108
- Added to NRHP: October 6, 2004

Violet Cemetery, also known as the Osceola Grave Yard, is a cemetery in Osceola, Arkansas. It is the city's oldest cemetery, with its oldest dated grave marked 1831. Many of the area's early settlers are buried here, and it is the earliest known surviving element of the early days of the area's settlement. It is located near the county courthouse, in an area bounded by West Johnson Avenue, Semmes Avenue, and Pecan Street. It is a flat, square site, flanked by trees.

At the beginning of the twentieth century a group of ladies formed a Cemetery Association to reclaim the burial ground which had become neglected. They fenced it, reset memorials and paths, and planted violets on the graves from which the ground got its current name. It is now managed by the City of Osceola.

Its burials include early settlers, 42 veterans of the Civil War, a congressman (William Joshua Driver (1873–1948)), early citizens and developers of Osceola, which was incorporated some 44 years after the earliest marked grave.

The cemetery was listed on the National Register of Historic Places in 2004.

== See also ==
- National Register of Historic Places listings in Mississippi County, Arkansas
