= Keiser School =

- U.S. National Register of Historic Places
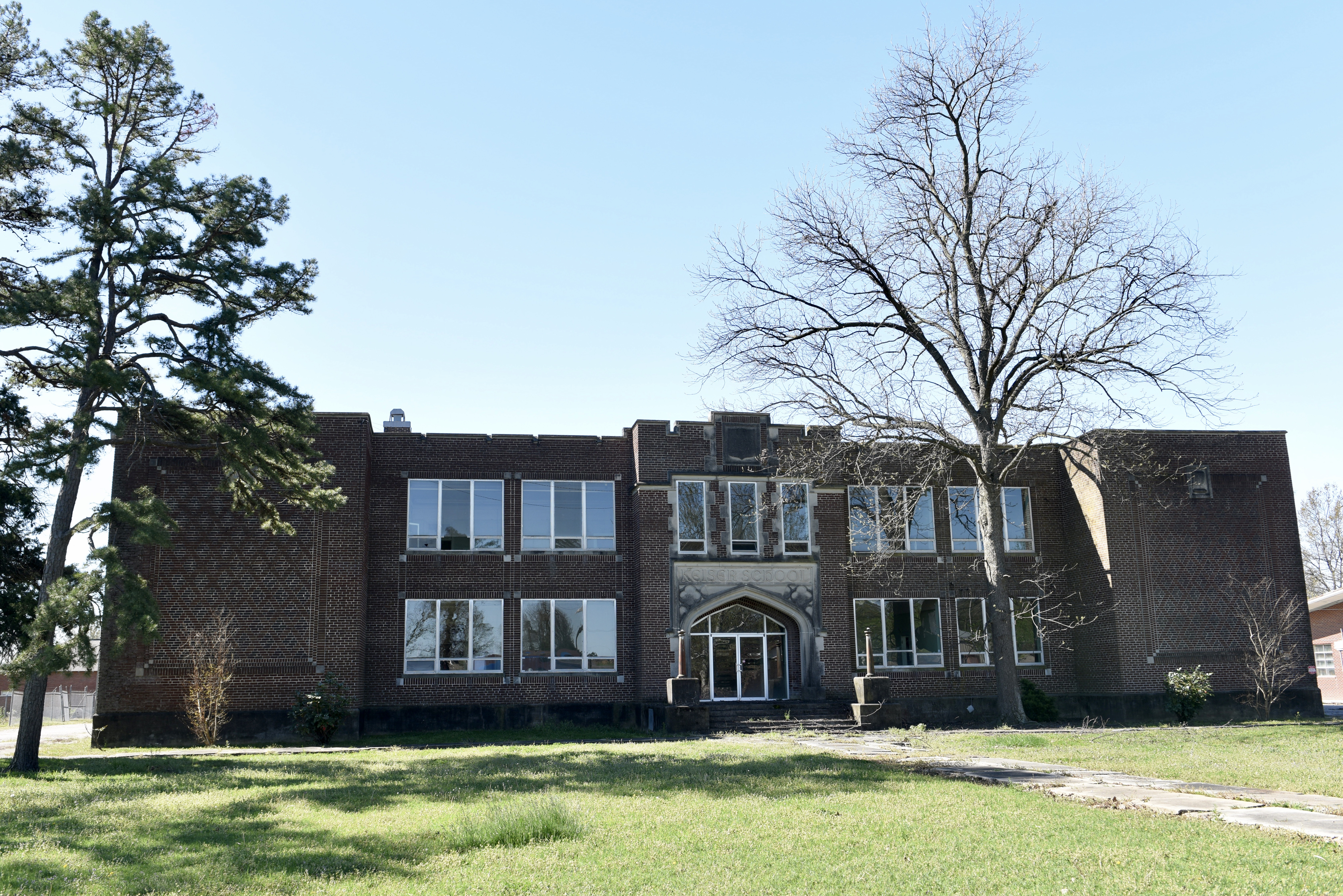

- Location within Arkansas Location within the United States
- Location: Jct. of Main and School Sts., SE corner, Keiser, Arkansas
- Coordinates: 35°40′26″N 90°5′42″W
- Area: 2 acres (0.81 ha)
- Built: 1929
- Architect: Branson, Uzzell; Bliven, S.W., & Son
- Architectural style: Late Gothic Revival, Collegiate Gothic
- NRHP reference No.: 92001342
- Added to NRHP: October 8, 1992

The Keiser School is a historic school building located at the intersection of Main and School Streets in Keiser, Arkansas. The building is a two-story brick and concrete structure with a rough T-shape. The horizontal arm of the T-shaped building contains classrooms and offices, while the rear extension houses the auditorium and gymnasium. The building exemplifies restrained Collegiate Gothic architecture, featuring a raised castellated parapet and a pointed archway above the main entrance. Constructed in 1929, it serves as a notable local example of this architectural style.

The building was listed on the National Register of Historic Places in 1992.

== See also ==
- National Register of Historic Places listings in Mississippi County, Arkansas
