= Osceola Times Building =

- U.S. National Register of Historic Places
- U.S. Historic district – Contributing property
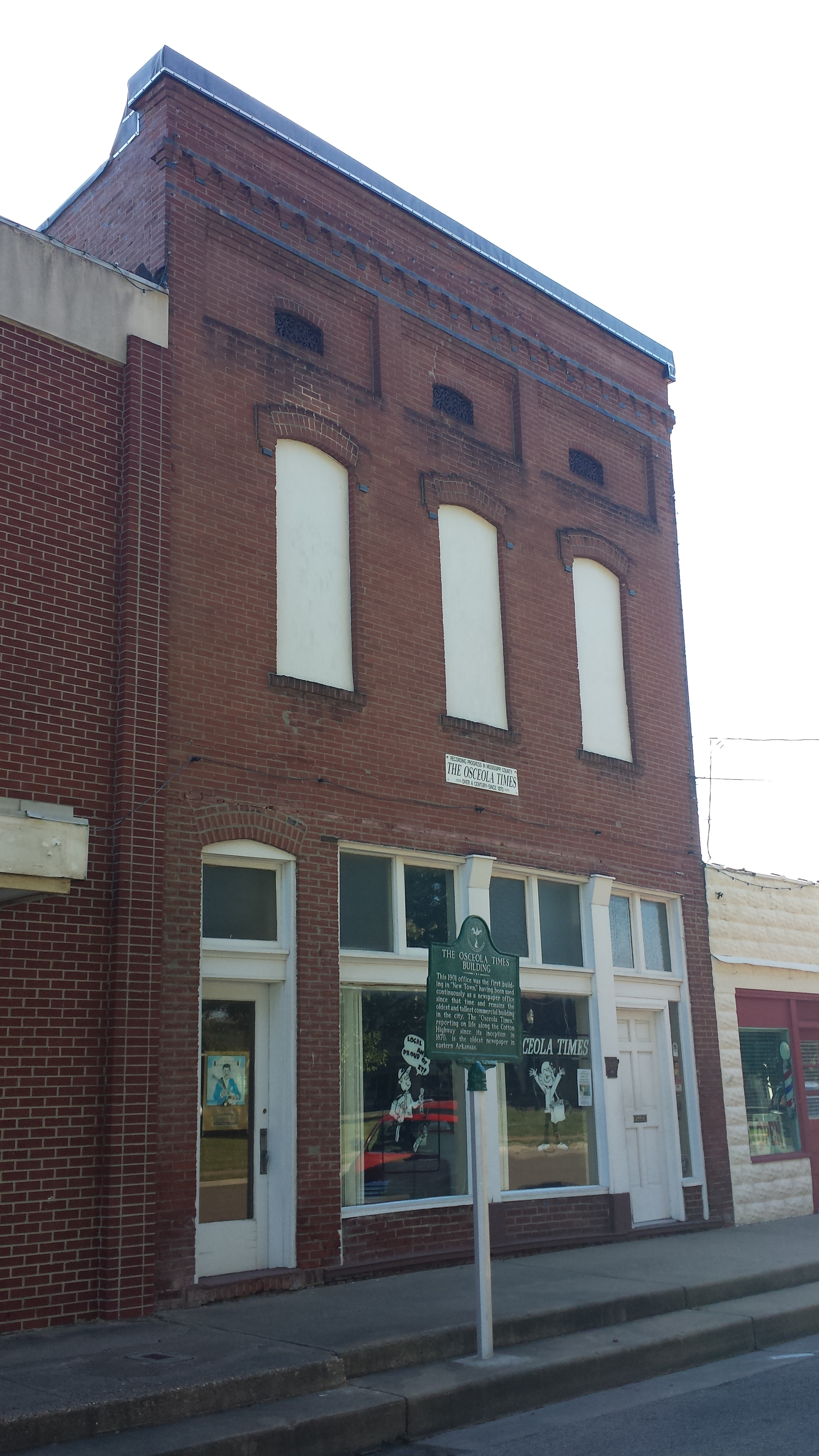

- Location within Arkansas Location within the United States
- Location: 112 N. Poplar St., Osceola, Arkansas
- Coordinates: 35°42′11″N 89°58′7″W
- Area: less than one acre
- Built: 1901
- Part of: Hale Avenue Historic District (ID08000722)
- MPS: Osceola MRA
- NRHP reference No.: 87001351

Significant dates
- Added to NRHP: August 6, 1987
- Designated CP: August 1, 2008

The Osceola Times Building is a historic commercial building at 112 North Poplar Street in downtown Osceola, Arkansas.

== History ==
The Osceola Times is the oldest weekly published newspaper in Arkansas. The paper was first published in 1870 by Leon Roussan, the town's first mayor who also helped with Osceola's incorporation in 1875.

Built in 1901, this two story brick building is one of the oldest commercial structures in that part of the city, and was a significant element in the development of "new" Osceola following the town's relocation from the Mississippi River to be closer to the Frisco Railroad. The Osceola Times is the oldest newspaper in Mississippi County.

== Building Description ==
Per the NRHP nomination form: "This early twentieth century commercial building is of brick construction and is rectangular shaped with a flat roof. On the first story of the façade (west elevation) the original doorways with transoms and plate glass windows appear. The door to the right was the entrance for the newspaper offices while the door on the left led to the second floor apartment where the editor and his family Lived. Originally a panel appeared above the first floor plate glass windows which contained "THE OSCEOLA TIMES". The second story of the façade is marked by three tall windows w i t h elliptical arched brick lintels. Three recessed brick areas above the windows contain decorative vents. A brick parapet rises above a dentiled cornice at the top of the building.

The building was listed on the National Register of Historic Places in 1987.

On May 18, 2023, Preserve Arkansas, a historic preservation non-profit group, announced that the Osceola Times Building was on its 2023 Most Endangered historical properties list. Per the organization's director "The building is vacant and deteriorating rapidly due to a partial roof collapse about a year ago."

== See also ==
- National Register of Historic Places listings in Mississippi County, Arkansas
