= Wilson Commercial Historic District =

Historic district in Arkansas, United States

- U.S. National Register of Historic Places
- U.S. Historic district
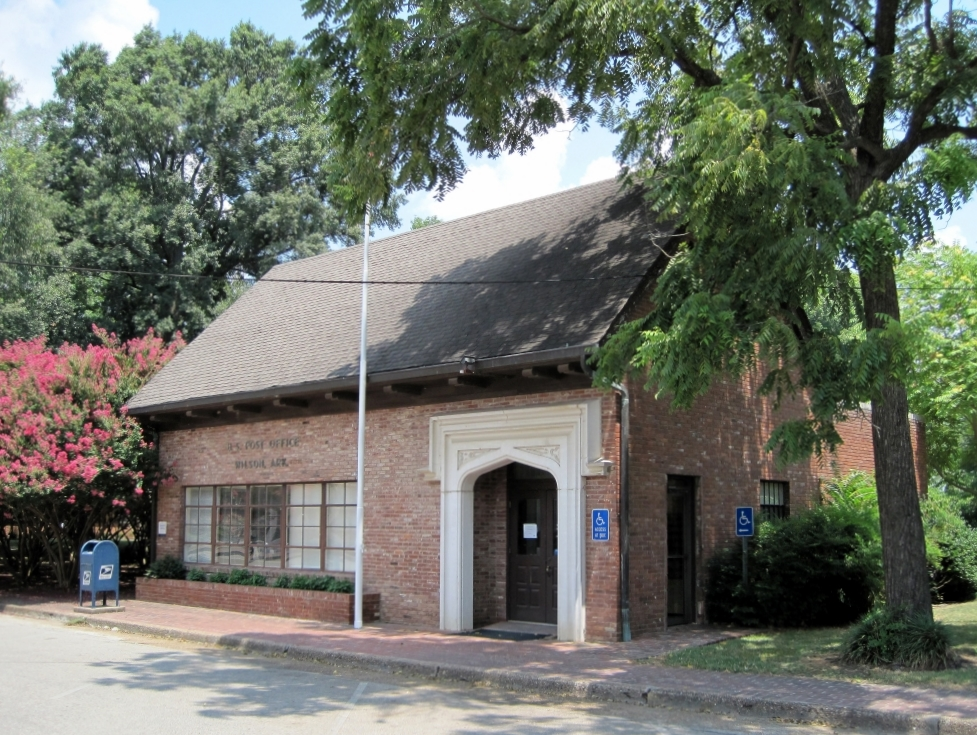
- Wilson Post Office

- Location within Arkansas Location within the United States
- Location: Roughly bounded by Union Ave., S. Jefferson, Madison, Adams & 2nd Sts., Wilson, Arkansas
- Coordinates: 35°34′7″N 90°2′35″W
- Area: 19.2 acres (7.8 ha)
- Built: 1912
- NRHP reference No.: 16000651
- Added to NRHP: September 23, 2016

The Willson Commercial Historic District encompasses the commercial and industrial heart of Wilson, Arkansas. Founded in 1886 as a company town by Robert Edward Lee Wilson, the city's growth was regulated and planned by the company until it was formally incorporated in 1950. This district encompasses the historic town square, commercial buildings, and the administrative and industrial buildings of the company's cotton gin and flour mill.

The district was listed on the National Register of Historic Places in 2016.

== See also ==
- National Register of Historic Places listings in Mississippi County, Arkansas
