= Leachville station =

- Blytheville, Leachville and Arkansas Southern Railroad Depot-Leachville
- U.S. National Register of Historic Places
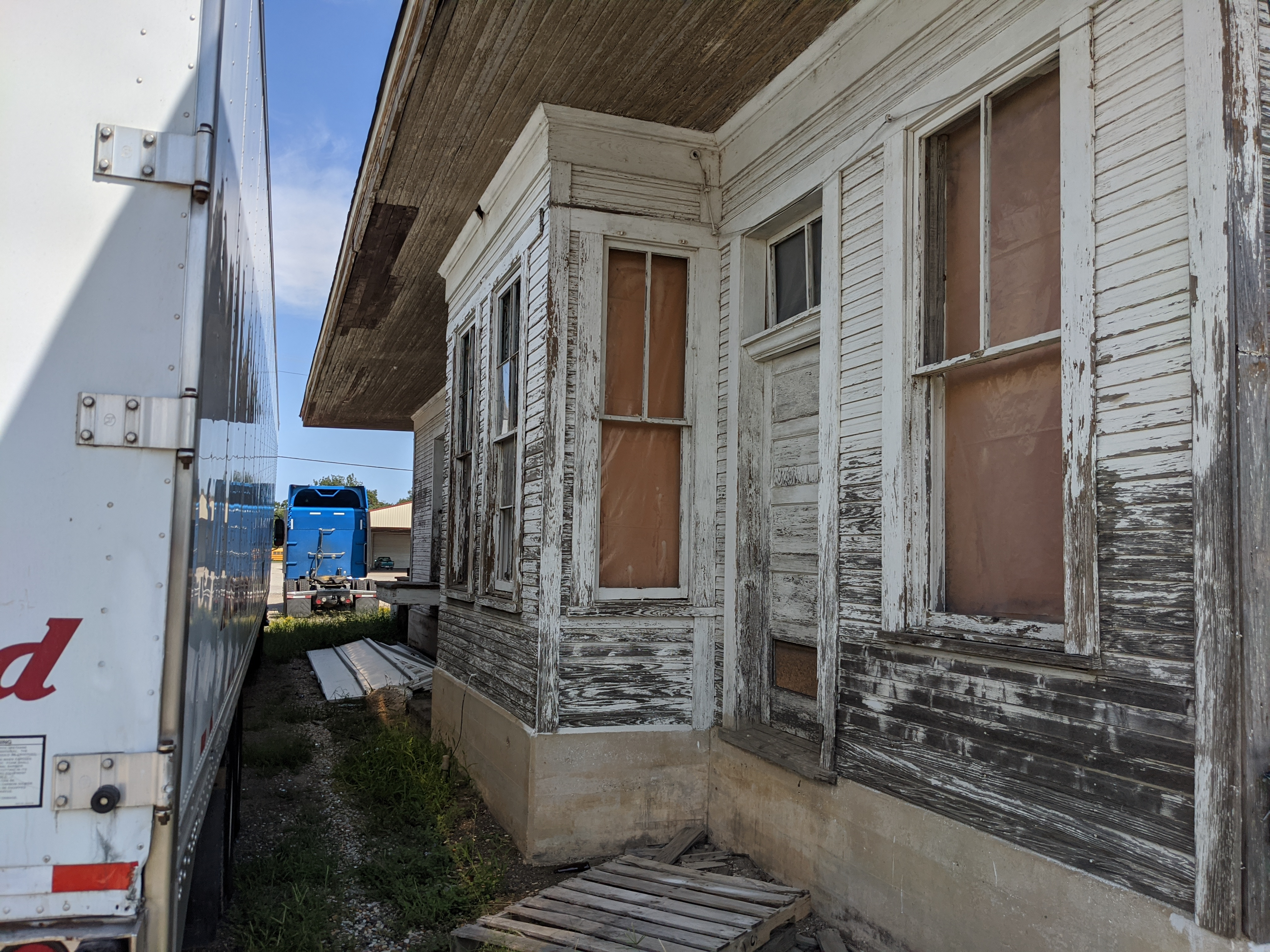

- Location within Arkansas Location within the United States
- Location: NE corner of 2nd and McNamee Sts. Leachville, Arkansas
- Coordinates: 35°56′15″N 90°15′33″W
- Area: less than one acre
- Built: 1910
- Built by: Blytheville, Leachville & Arkansas Southern Railroad
- Architectural style: Late 19th And Early 20th Century American Movements
- MPS: Historic Railroad Depots of Arkansas MPS
- NRHP reference No.: 92000612
- Added to NRHP: June 11, 1992

The Blytheville, Leachville and Arkansas Southern Railroad Depot-Leachville is a historic railroad station at the junction of 2nd and McNamee Streets in Leachville, Arkansas. It is a single-story wood-frame structure, with an asphalt roof and wide overhanging eaves. The telegrapher's station is in a small projection on the track side of the building. The station, which provided both passenger and freight service, was built in 1910 by the Blytheville, Leachville and Arkansas Southern Railroad, a small regional railroad seeking to provide additional means for area farmers to bring their products to a wider market.

The station was listed on the National Register of Historic Places in 1992.

== See also ==
- National Register of Historic Places listings in Mississippi County, Arkansas
