= Minaret Manor =

Historic house in Arkansas, United States

- U.S. National Register of Historic Places
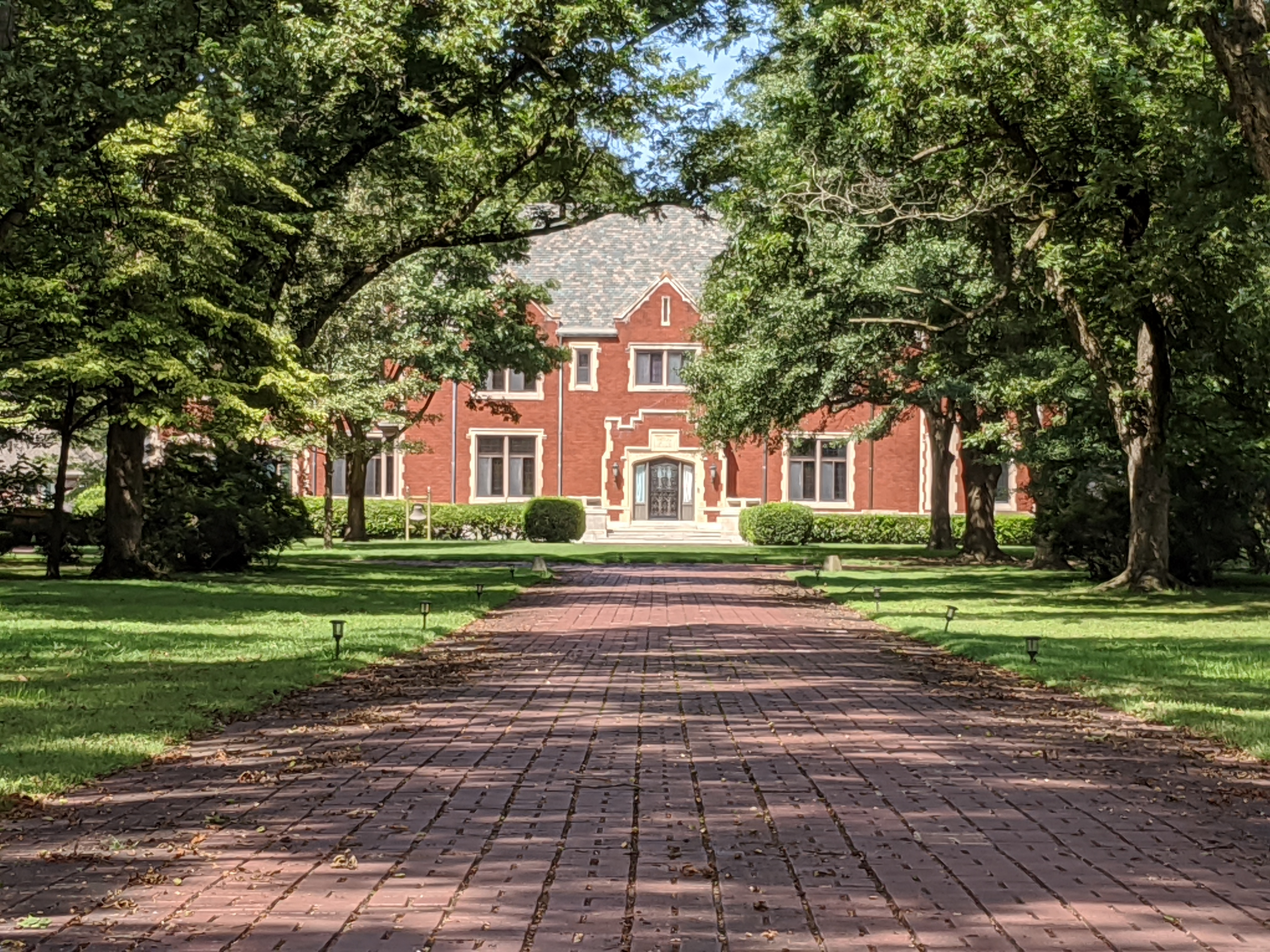

- Location within Arkansas Location within the United States
- Location: 844 W. Semmes Ave., Osceola, Arkansas
- Coordinates: 35°42′23″N 89°58′51″W
- Area: 5 acres (2.0 ha)
- Built: 1948
- Architect: Hanker & Heyer
- Architectural style: Tudor Revival
- NRHP reference No.: 100000554
- Added to NRHP: January 24, 2017

Minaret Manor is the original name of “The Florida Mansion” a historic mansion house at 844 West Semmes Avenue in Osceola, Arkansas. Set on a landscape 5-acre (2.0 ha) parcel (reduced by subdivision from the original 15), it is a large 2 1/2-story brick Tudor Revival building. The lower portions of the house are finished in brick laid in stretcher bond, while gabled upper areas exhibit half-timbering with brick laid in a diagonal basket weave pattern. At the right front side of the main facade is a three-story turret with conical roof. The house was built in 1948 for Andrew J. Florida, the principal owner of a real estate empire that extended across eastern Arkansas and western Tennessee.

The house was listed on the National Register of Historic Places in 2017.

== See also ==
- Florida Brothers Building
- National Register of Historic Places listings in Mississippi County, Arkansas
