= Wilson High School Gymnasium =

- U.S. National Register of Historic Places
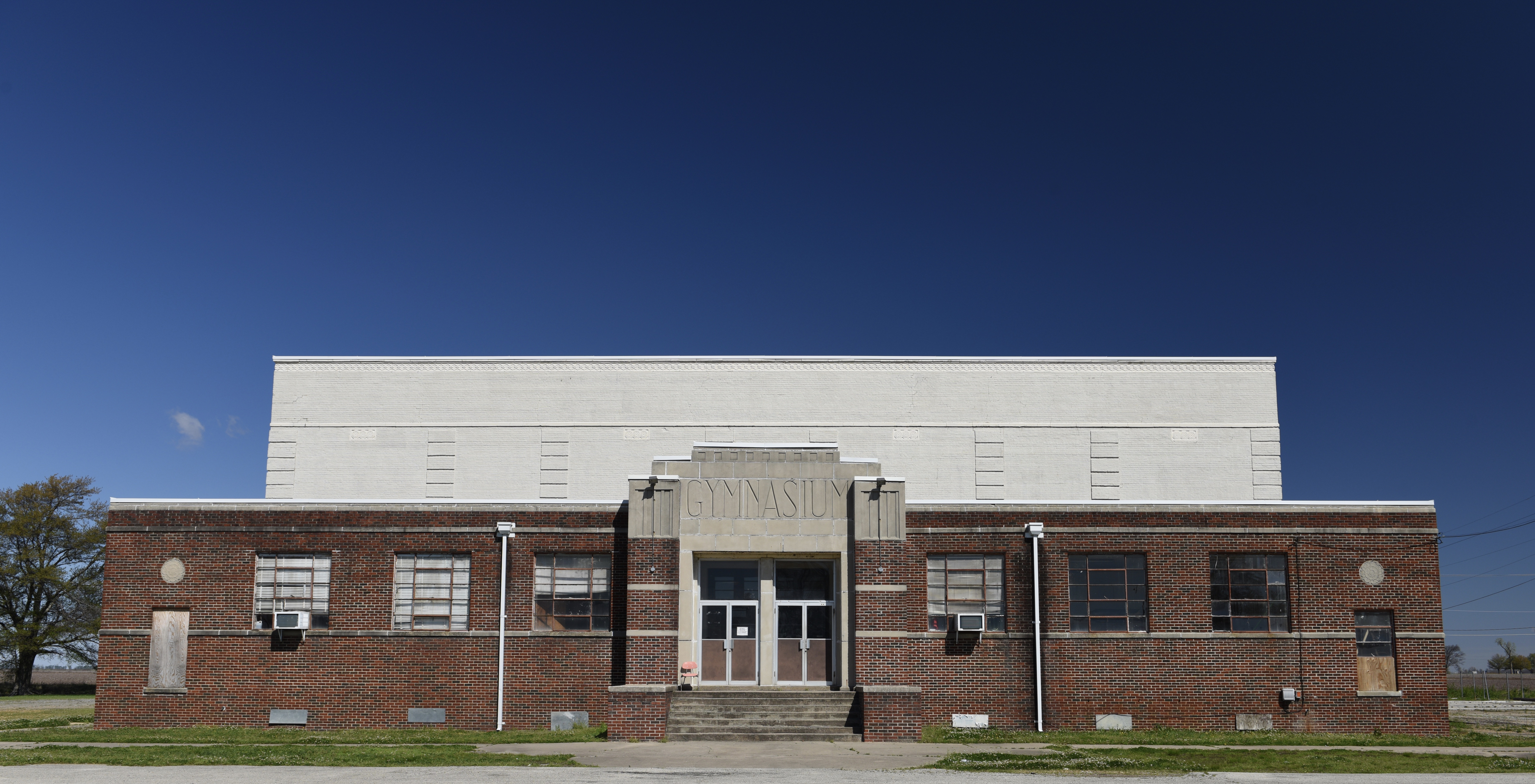

- Location within Arkansas Location within the United States
- Location: Main & Lee Sts. Wilson, Arkansas
- Coordinates: 35°33′53″N 90°3′3″W
- Area: less than one acre
- Built: 1948
- Architectural style: Art Deco
- NRHP reference No.: 15000286
- Added to NRHP: May 27, 2015

The Wilson High School Gymnasium is a historic school athletic facility at Main and Lee Streets in Wilson, Arkansas. Built in 1948 and used until the early 2000's, this large single-story Art Deco brick building is a remarkably well-preserved facility (despite having sat largely vacant and unused for the last several years), with original floors, bleachers, and equipment such as basketball hoops and scoreboards. In its early years the facility hosted state basketball tournaments due to it size and functionality. The gymnasium floor was also rigged with floor mounts for boxing ring posts. Boxing was a very popular sport in Mississippi County from the 1940's to the 1970's. The indoor swimming pool at the rear of the building retains original tile work.

The building was listed on the National Register of Historic Places in 2015.

== See also ==
- National Register of Historic Places listings in Mississippi County, Arkansas
