= Blytheville Commercial Historic District =

Historic district in Arkansas, United States

- U.S. National Register of Historic Places
- U.S. Historic district
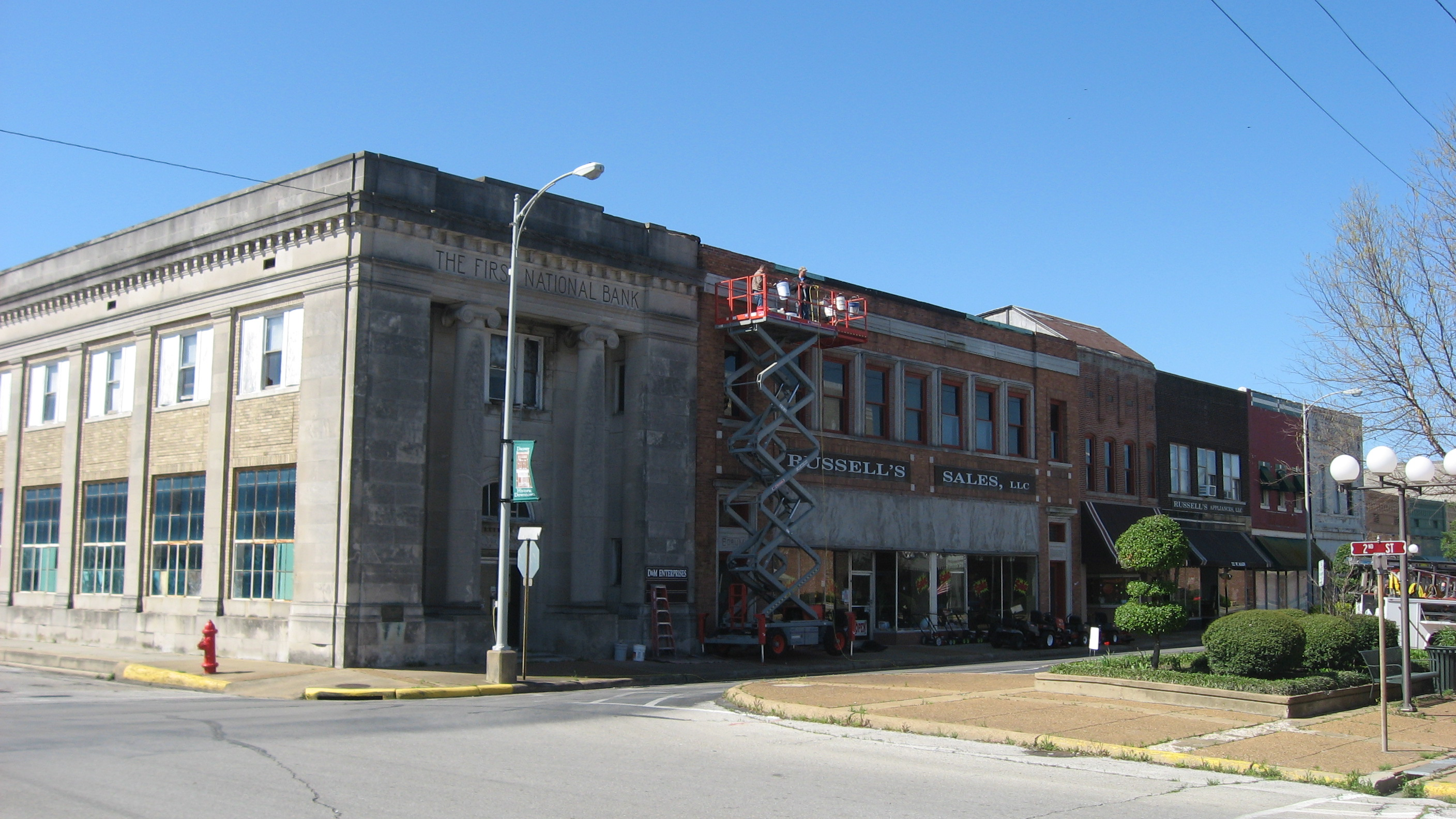
- Main Street at 2nd

- Location within Arkansas Location within the United States
- Location: Main St. bet. 5th and Franklin Sts., Ash St. bet. 5th and 2nd Sts., Blytheville, Arkansas
- Coordinates: 35.92747°N 89.90418°W
- Area: 25 acres (10 ha)
- Built: 1890
- Architectural style: Late 19th And 20th Century Revivals, Modern Movement
- NRHP reference No.: 06000421
- Added to NRHP: May 24, 2006

The Blytheville Commercial Historic District encompasses most of the central business district of Blytheville, Arkansas, one of the TWO JUDICIAL DISTRICTS of Mississippi County. It extends along Main Street between 5th and Franklin Streets, and along Ash Street between 5th and 2nd. Most of the 39 buildings in the district were built between 1890 and 1956, in three phases of development. The two oldest buildings in the district, both dating to c. 1890, are at 112 West Main and 106 East Main. The building traditionally viewed as the anchor of the downtown area is the Kirby-Heath building at the corner of Main and 2nd, built 1901.

The district was listed on the National Register of Historic Places in 2006. The Kress Building at 210 Main Street, separately listed in 1997, is also within the district.

== See also ==
- National Register of Historic Places listings in Mississippi County, Arkansas
