= Garden Point Cemetery =

Historic cemetery in Arkansas, United States

- U.S. National Register of Historic Places
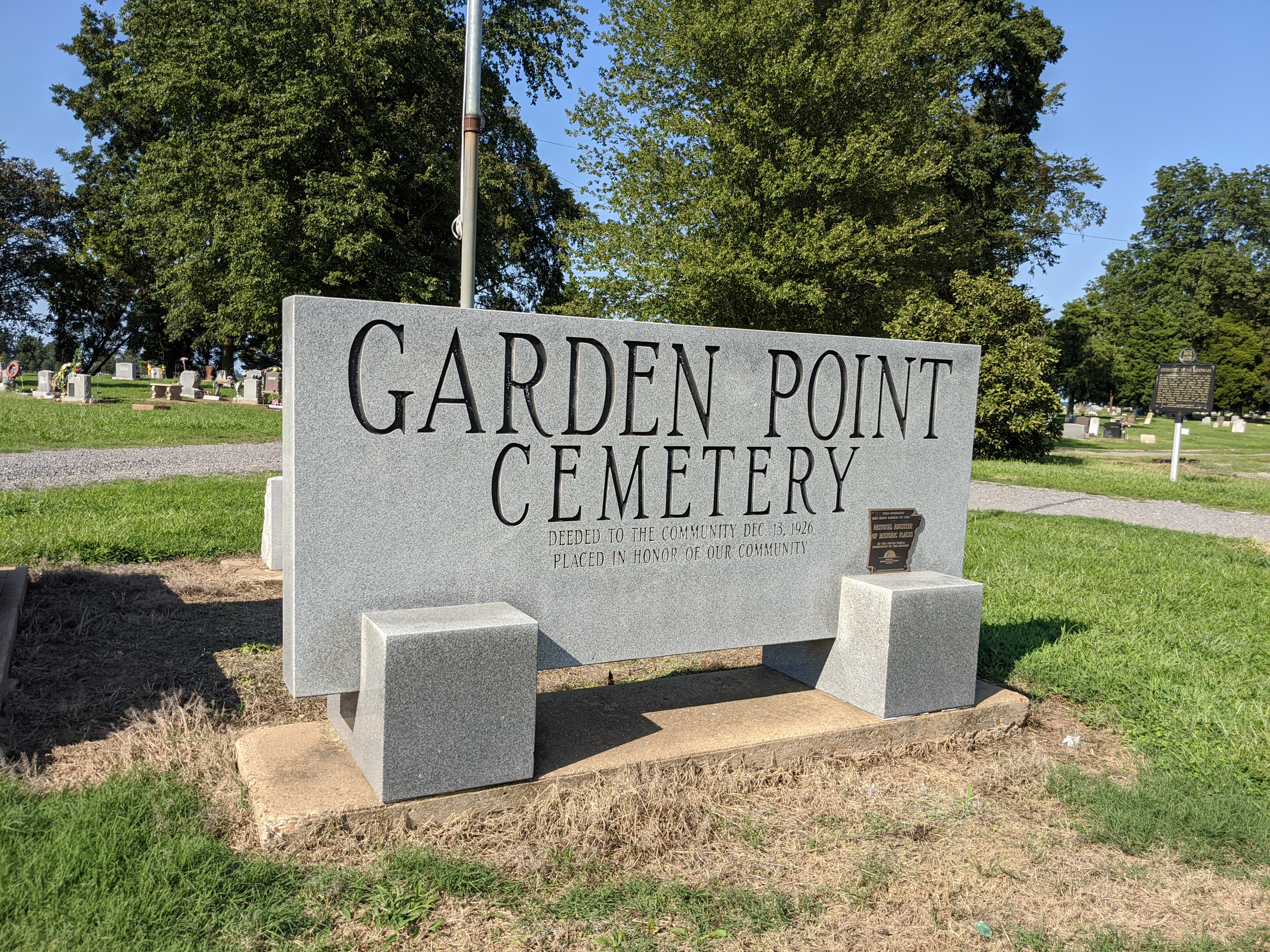

- Location within Arkansas Location within the United States
- Location: 4682 West AR 140, Etowah, Arkansas
- Coordinates: 35°42′8″N 90°14′17″W
- Area: 7.5 acres (3.0 ha)
- Built: 1890
- NRHP reference No.: 06000415
- Added to NRHP: May 24, 2006

The Garden Point Cemetery is a historic cemetery on Arkansas Highway 140 in southern Etowah, Arkansas. It is the city's oldest cemetery, and where many of its earliest citizens are buried. The cemetery occupies a ridge of land south of the city center, which is one of the highest areas overlooking the Mississippi River plains. Although the oldest known graves date to 1890, the oldest marked grave is dated 1903, and is for Reddrick Henry Jackson, one of Etowah's founders. The cemetery, now owned by the city, has more than 2000 burials.

The cemetery was listed on the National Register of Historic Places in 2006.

== See also ==
- National Register of Historic Places listings in Mississippi County, Arkansas
