= Mississippi County Jail =

- Formerly listed on the U.S. National Register of Historic Places
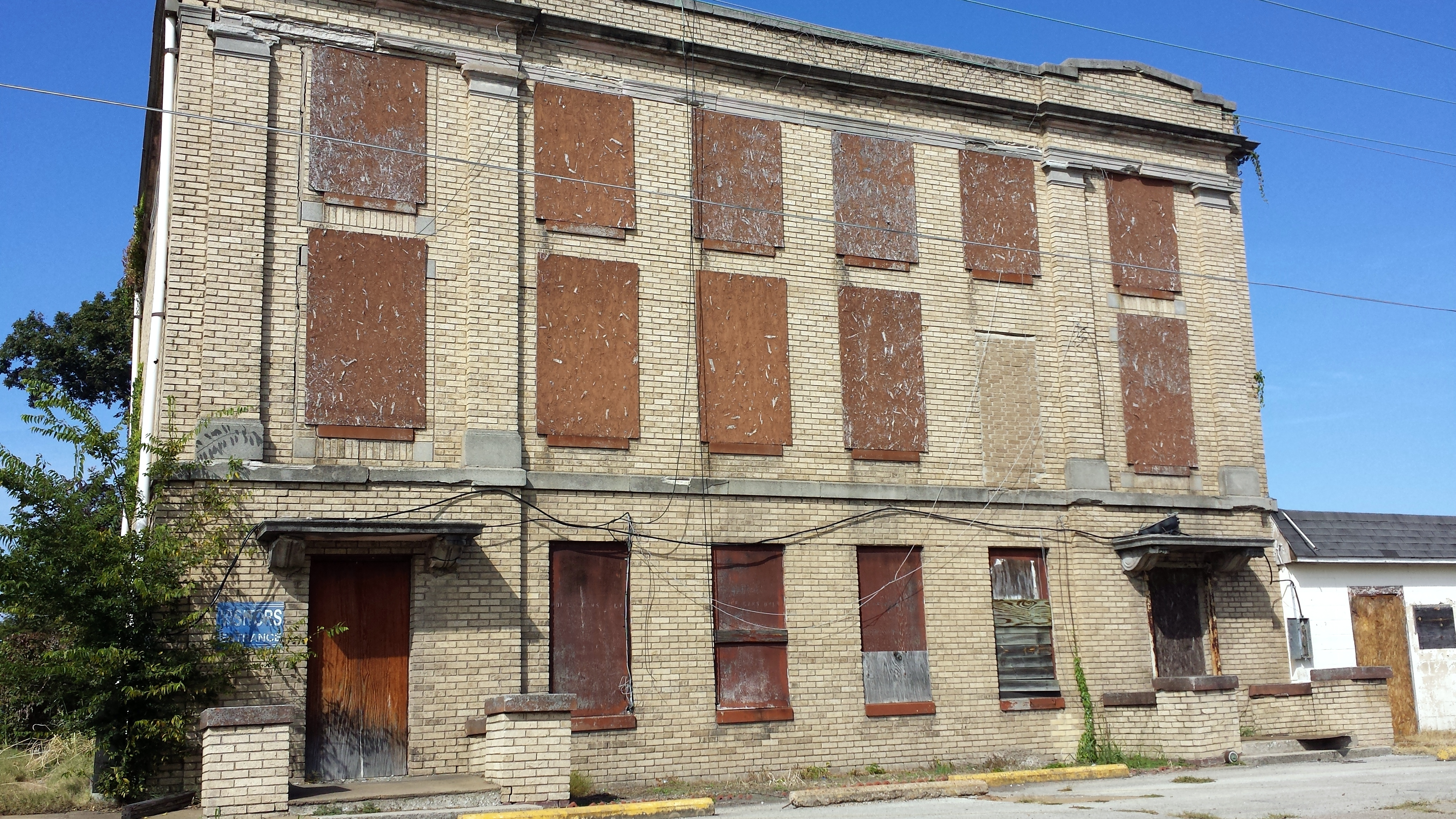

- Location within Arkansas Location within the United States
- Location: 300 S. Poplar St., Osceola, Arkansas
- Coordinates: 35°42′6″N 89°58′9″W
- Area: less than one acre
- Built: 1926
- MPS: Osceola MRA
- NRHP reference No.: 87001356

Significant dates
- Added to NRHP: August 6, 1987
- Removed from NRHP: January 24, 2017

The Mississippi County Jail was a historic county jail building in Osceola, Arkansas. It was a three-story brick structure, six bays wide, with entrances at the outer two bays, which projected slightly and were set off from the central portion by brick pilasters and a decorative parapet at the roof line. The county built the jail in 1926; it was demolished in 2016.

The building was listed on the National Register of Historic Places in 1987. It was delisted in 2017.

== See also ==
- National Register of Historic Places listings in Mississippi County, Arkansas
