= S. H. Kress and Co. Building (Blytheville, Arkansas) =

- Kress Building
- U.S. National Register of Historic Places
- U.S. Historic district – Contributing property
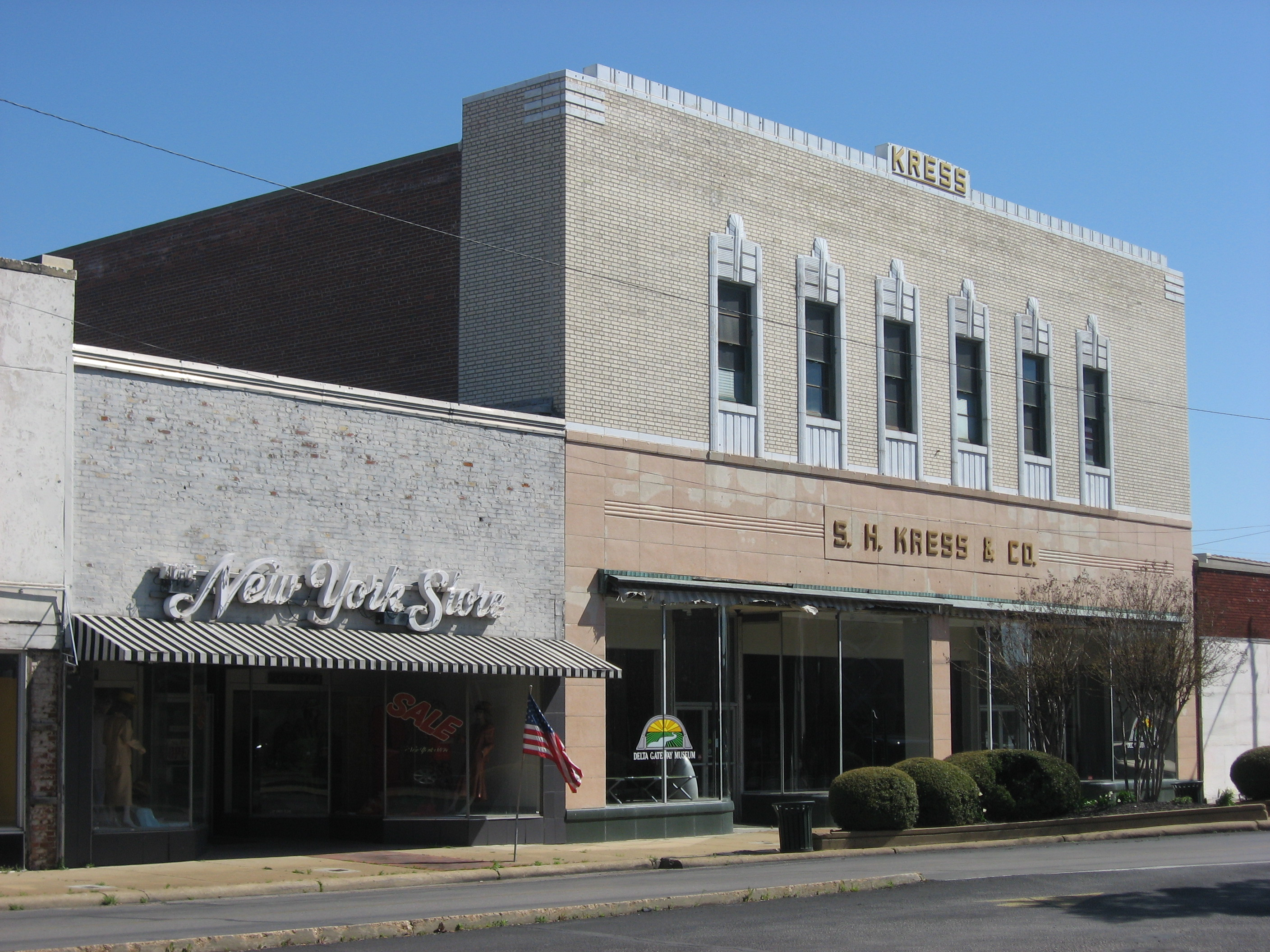
- S.H. Kress Building, looking north on Main Street Blytheville

- Location within Arkansas Location within the United States
- Location: 210 W. Main St., Blytheville, Arkansas
- Coordinates: 35°55′40″N 89°53′37″W
- Area: less than one acre
- Built: 1938
- Built by: Bird, E.V. Construction Co.
- Architect: Holmes, W.F.
- Architectural style: Art Deco
- Part of: Blytheville Commercial Historic District (ID06000421)
- NRHP reference No.: 97000555

Significant dates
- Added to NRHP: June 13, 1997
- Designated CP: May 24, 2006

The Kress Building is a historic commercial building at 210 West Main Street in Blytheville, Arkansas. It is a two-story concrete and steel structure, faced in brick and terra cotta. The building is the home of the Delta Gateway Museum, which interprets the history of the city of Blytheville and the surrounding area.

== History ==
Built in 1938, it was one of the first buildings in the city to be built using steel framing, and is considered by the Arkansas Historic Preservation Program as one of its finest Art Deco structures in the state. S. H. Kress and Co. operated from the store until 1974. A Family Dollar Store operated from the building from the mid to late 80's. Later, the building housed the local United Way. It was donated to the town and then renovated in 1997 to serve as the Blytheville Heritage Museum and the Blytheville office of Main Street Arkansas.

The building was listed on the National Register of Historic Places in 1997. It is in the Blytheville Commercial Historic District, also listed on the NRHP.

== Description ==
The first floor areas (outside the plate glass store windows) are faced in terra cotta, while the second floor is predominantly cream-colored brick. Windows on the second floor are surrounded by ivory terra cotta incised with fluting and shell patterns.

== Delta Gateway Museum ==
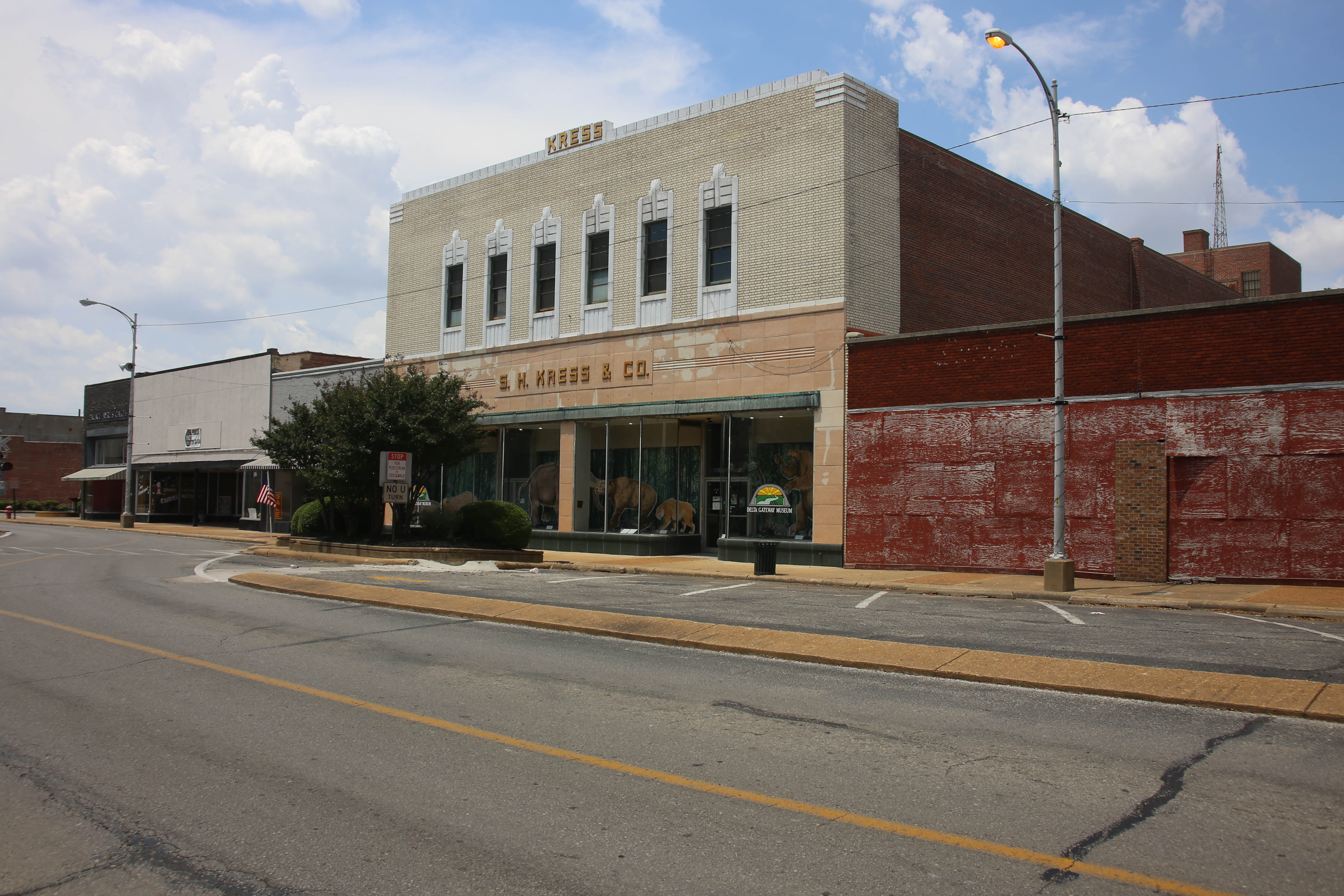
Kress Building, looking south

The Delta Gateway Museum opened in the Kress Building in November 2011. The museum was conceived of in 2009, and is owned by the city of Blytheville and operated by the Delta Gateway Museum Commission. The museum's collection focuses on the history of the town, from its early founding in the 1880s to the modern era. Major exhibits focus on the Mississippian culture that previously inhabited the area, the cotton trade of the early 1900s, and a replica tenant farmer homestead.

== See also ==
- National Register of Historic Places listings in Mississippi County, Arkansas
- Samuel Henry Kress
