= City Hall (Osceola, Arkansas) =

- U.S. National Register of Historic Places
- U.S. Historic district – Contributing property
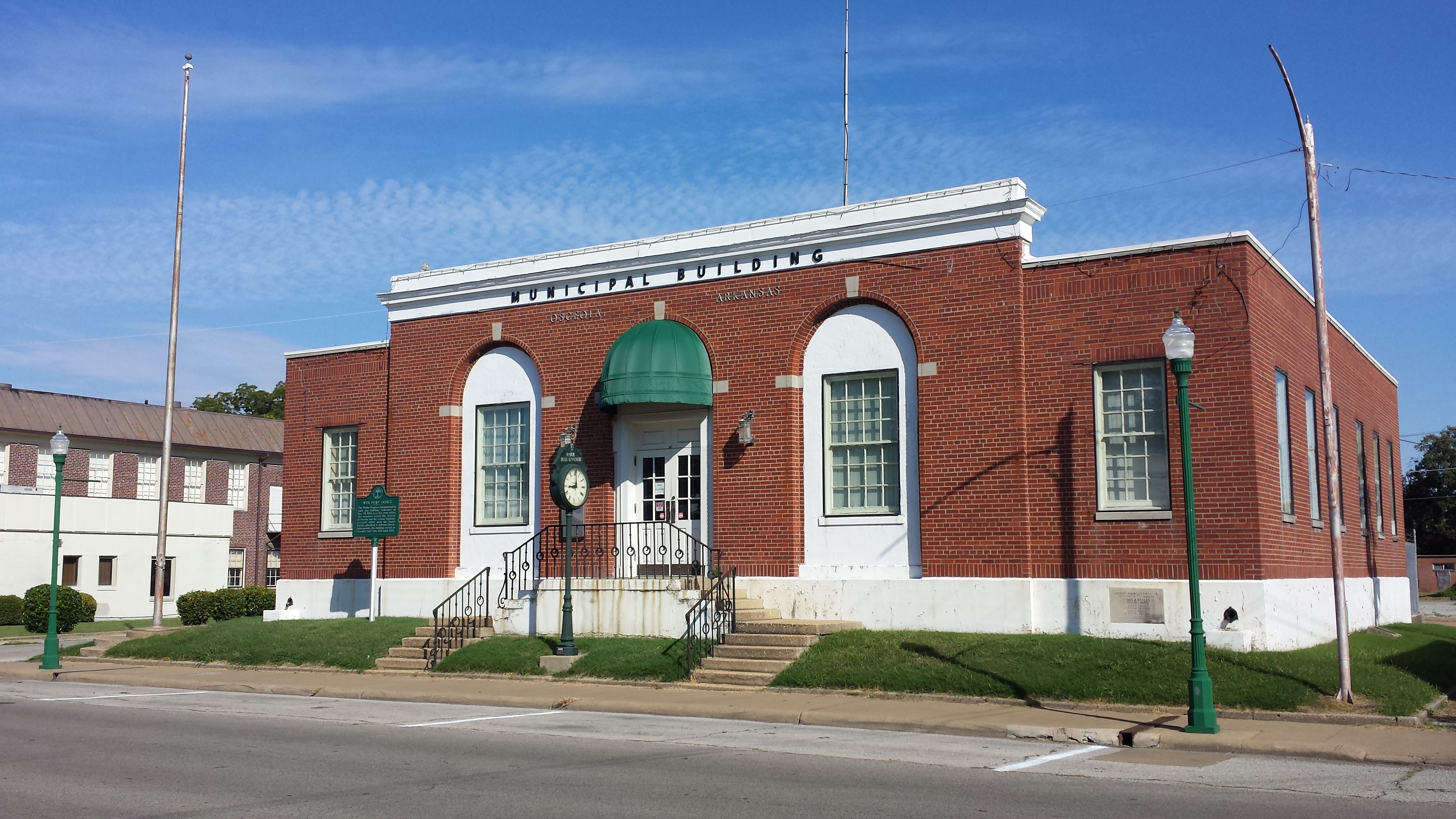

- Location within Arkansas Location within the United States
- Location: 316 W. Hale St., Osceola, Arkansas
- Coordinates: 35°42′10″N 89°58′15″W
- Area: less than one acre
- Built: 1936
- Built by: Works Progress Administration
- Part of: Hale Avenue Historic District (ID08000722)
- MPS: Osceola MRA
- NRHP reference No.: 87001350

Significant dates
- Added to NRHP: August 6, 1987
- Designated CP: August 1, 2008

The City Hall of Osceola, Arkansas, is located at 316 West Hale Street, in the city's central business district. It is a single-story red brick building with flat roof, built in 1936 by the Works Progress Administration to house the local post office. The interior lobby space is decorated by a mural entitled "Early Settlers of Osceola", painted in 1939 by Orville Carroll with funding from the Treasury Department's Section of Fine Arts.

The building was listed on the National Register of Historic Places in 1987.

== See also ==
- National Register of Historic Places listings in Mississippi County, Arkansas
