= Wilson Residential Historic District =

Historic district in Arkansas, United States

- U.S. National Register of Historic Places
- U.S. Historic district
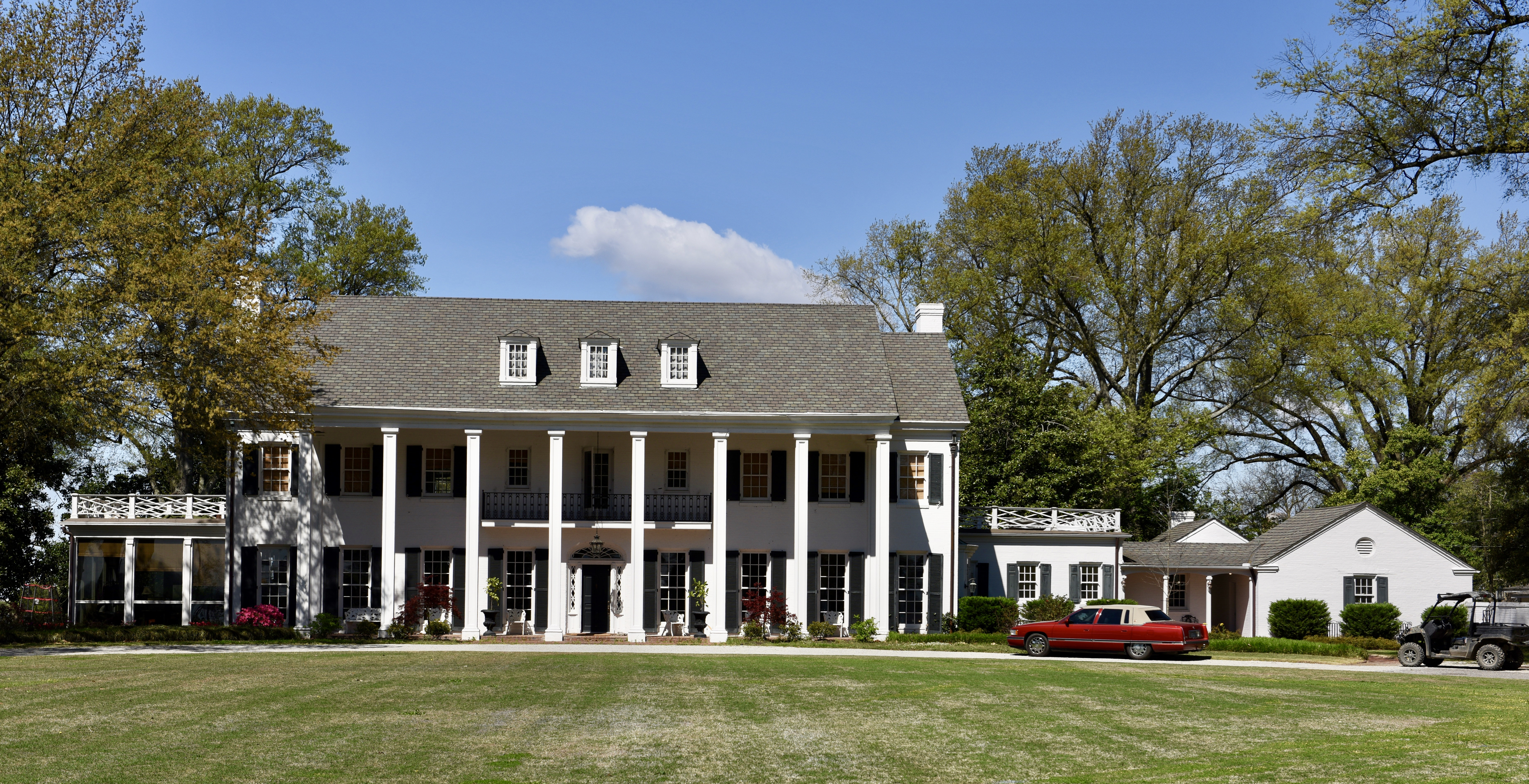

- Location within Arkansas Location within the United States
- Location: 4737, 4785, 4877 & 5101 US 61, Wilson, Arkansas
- Coordinates: 35°35′2″N 90°2′0″W
- Area: 83 acres (34 ha)
- Built: 1925
- NRHP reference No.: 16000652
- Added to NRHP: September 21, 2016

The Wilson Residential Historic District encompasses a cluster of four upscale residences just northeast of downtown Wilson, Arkansas, a city in Mississippi County, Arkansas. Founded in 1886 as a company town by Robert Edward Lee Wilson, the city's growth was regulated and planned by the company until it was formally incorporated in 1950. This district encompasses four houses built by owners and managers of the company, and related family members. All four stand on the northwest side of United States Route 61, about 0.5 miles (0.80 km) northeast of Wilson. Notable among them is the 1925 Tudor Revival house of Robert E. Lee Wilson Jr.

The district was listed on the National Register of Historic Places in 2016. It includes the Tudor-style home of Robert E. Lee Wilson, who went by the name Lee, designed by Memphis-based architect [George Mahan Jr.]

== See also ==
- National Register of Historic Places listings in Mississippi County, Arkansas
