= Blytheville Air Force Base Capehart Housing Historic District =

Historic district in Arkansas, United States

- U.S. National Register of Historic Places
- U.S. Historic district
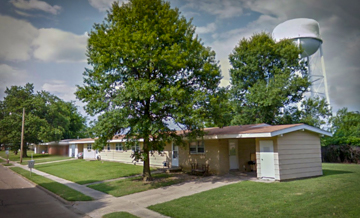

- Location within Arkansas Location within the United States
- Location: Roughly bounded by Village Ave., Northside, Cypress Dr., Hemlock, Westminster, Apricot, Azalea & Pigeon Sts., Blytheville, Arkansas
- Coordinates: 35°57′58″N 89°57′43″W
- Area: 277 acres (112 ha)
- Built: 1957
- NRHP reference No.: 15000628
- Added to NRHP: September 28, 2015

The Blytheville Air Force Base Capehart Housing Historic District encompasses a large residential area built between 1957 and 1962 as part of a military housing program for service members stationed at the now-closed Blytheville Air Force Base in Blytheville, Arkansas. This area was developed pursuant to guidelines established by the Federal Housing Administration (FHA), and is laid out with curvilinear roads meeting in three-way intersections, specified lot sizes and setback requirements, and a small number of building designs with a modest number of exceptions. The construction program under which this area was developed was named for Senator Homer Capehart, principal sponsor of the bill authorizing it. The area is roughly bounded by Memorial Drive, Village and Westminster Avenues, and Northside, and has more than 400 residences, most of which are single-story duplex ranches.

The district was listed on the National Register of Historic Places in 2015.

== See also ==
- National Register of Historic Places listings in Mississippi County, Arkansas
