= West Main Street Residential Historic District =

Historic district in Arkansas, United States

- West Main Street Historic District
- U.S. National Register of Historic Places
- U.S. Historic district
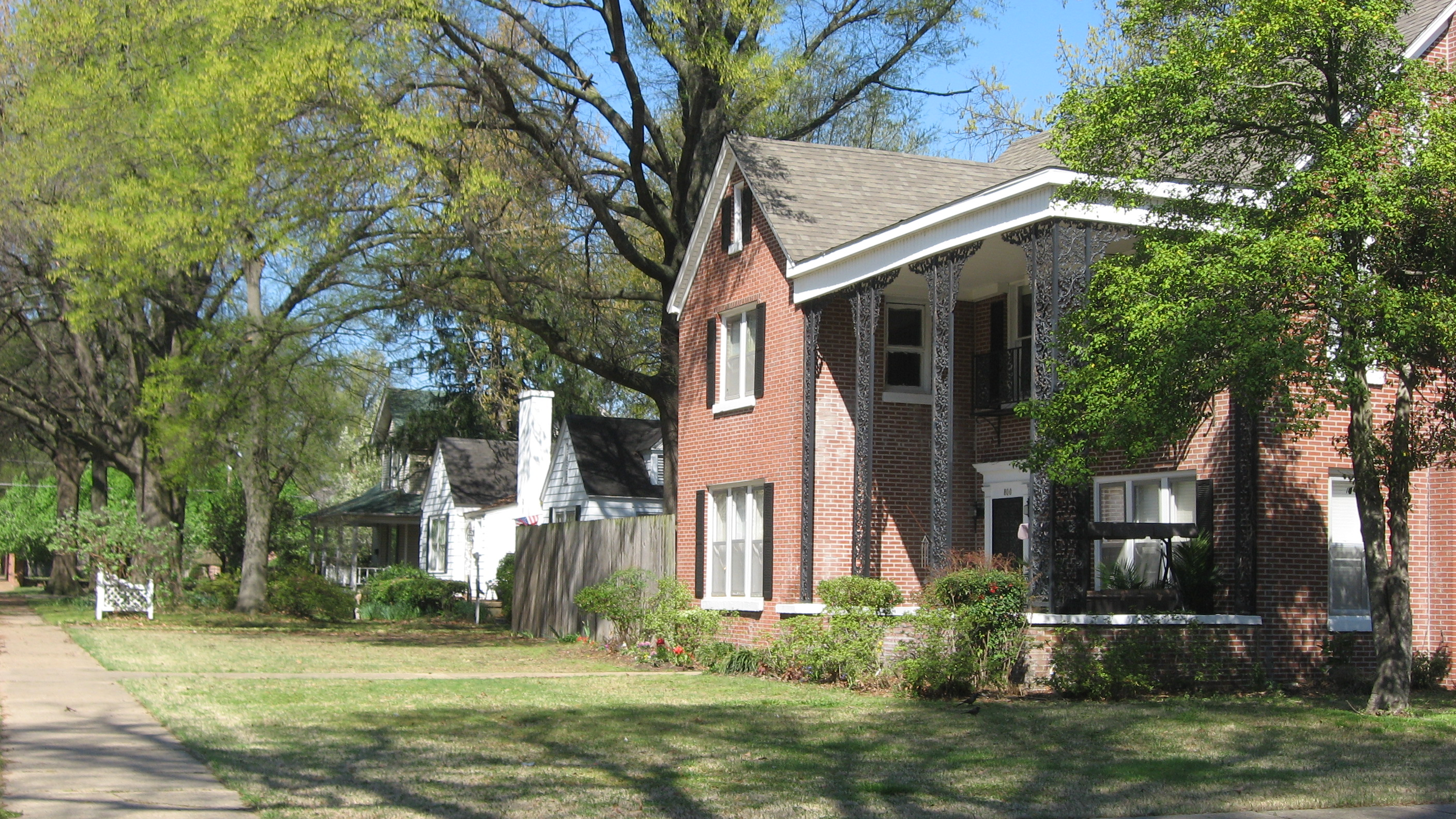
- Main Street west of 8th

- Location within Arkansas Location within the United States
- Location: W. Main St. between B and 6th St. and Division, Blytheville, Arkansas
- Coordinates: 35°55′39″N 89°54′48″W
- Area: 35 acres (14 ha)
- Architectural style: Late 19th And 20th Century Revivals, Craftsman/Bungalow, Tudor Revival
- NRHP reference No.: 10000521
- Added to NRHP: August 5, 2010

The West Main Street Residential Historic District of Blytheville, Arkansas, encompasses a seven-block residential stretch of West Main Street, which presents a well-preserved history of residential development during the first six decades of the 20th century. This time period includes Blytheville's most significant period of growth, which began with the arrival of the railroad in 1900. Most of the buildings in the district are residential wood-frame structures, one and two stories in height. Most of the buildings, including some that are no longer historically significant due to later alterations, were built between 1900 and 1930. Stylistically, the district includes a cross-section of architectural styles popular in the early 20th century, although there are a significant number of vernacular structures. The district extends from North 6th Street to Division Street, and includes fifty buildings, of which almost all are residential.

The district was listed on the National Register of Historic Places in 2010.

== See also ==
- National Register of Historic Places listings in Mississippi County, Arkansas
