= Florida Brothers Building =

- U.S. National Register of Historic Places
- U.S. Historic district – Contributing property
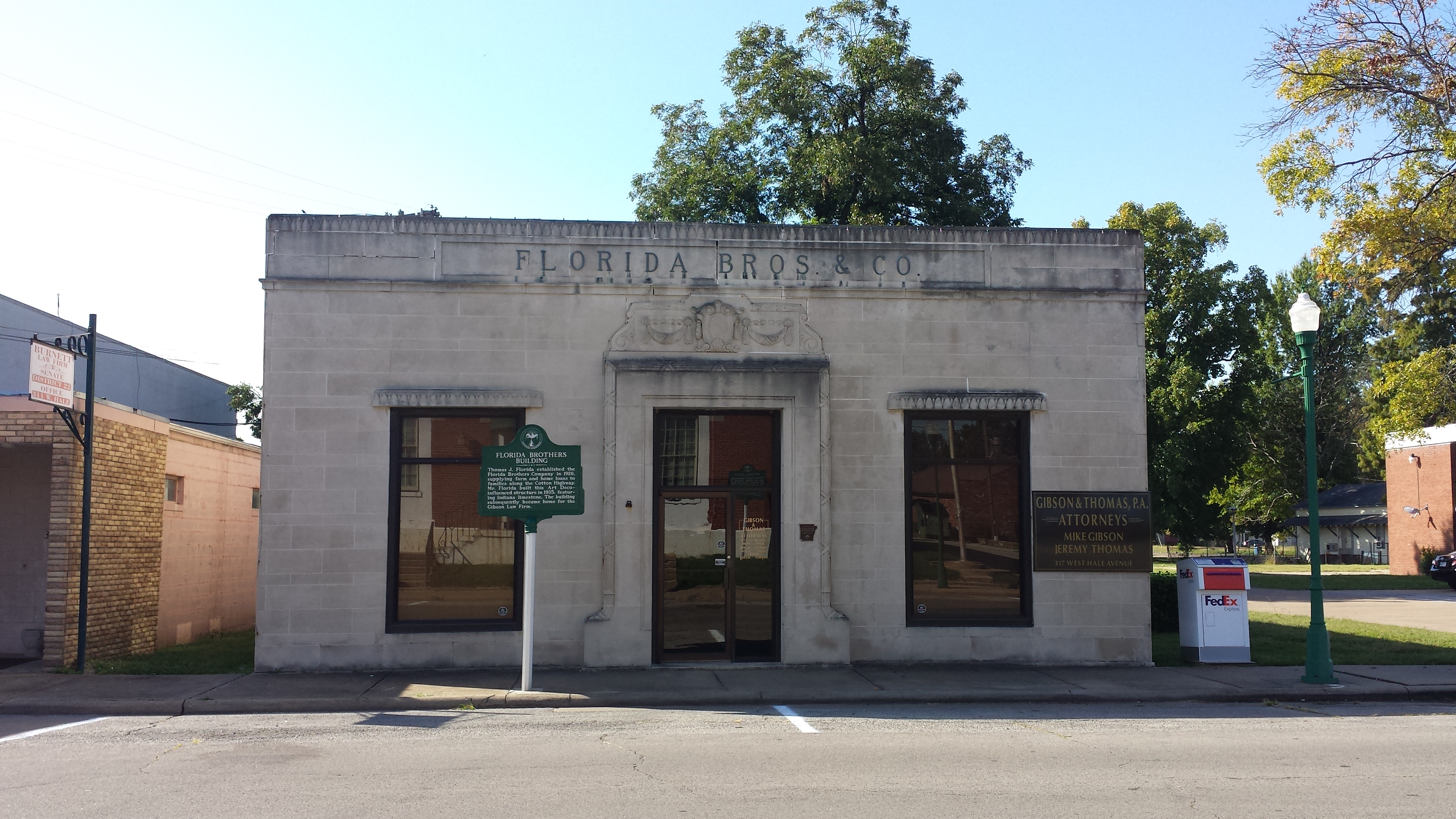

- Location within Arkansas Location within the United States
- Location: 319 W. Hale St., Osceola, Arkansas
- Coordinates: 35°42′9″N 89°58′15″W
- Area: less than one acre
- Built: 1936
- Architect: Thomas P. Florida
- Architectural style: Art Deco
- Part of: Hale Avenue Historic District (ID08000722)
- MPS: Osceola MRA
- NRHP reference No.: 87001355

Significant dates
- Added to NRHP: August 6, 1987
- Designated CP: August 1, 2008

The Florida Brothers Building is a historic commercial building at 319 West Hale Street in Osceola, Arkansas. It is a single-story structure, built of cut stone, with a flat roof. Built in 1936 by Thomas P. Florida to house a real estate business, it is a good example of restrained Art Deco styling. Its main facade has a center entry flanked by plate glass windows, which are topped by stone lintels cut to give the appearance of dentil molding. The entry has a projecting stone outline with reeding, and is topped by a decorative carving.

The building was listed on the National Register of Historic Places in 1987.

== See also ==
- Minaret Manor: nearby home of Andrew J. Florida
- National Register of Historic Places listings in Mississippi County, Arkansas
