= Wilson Community House =

- U.S. National Register of Historic Places
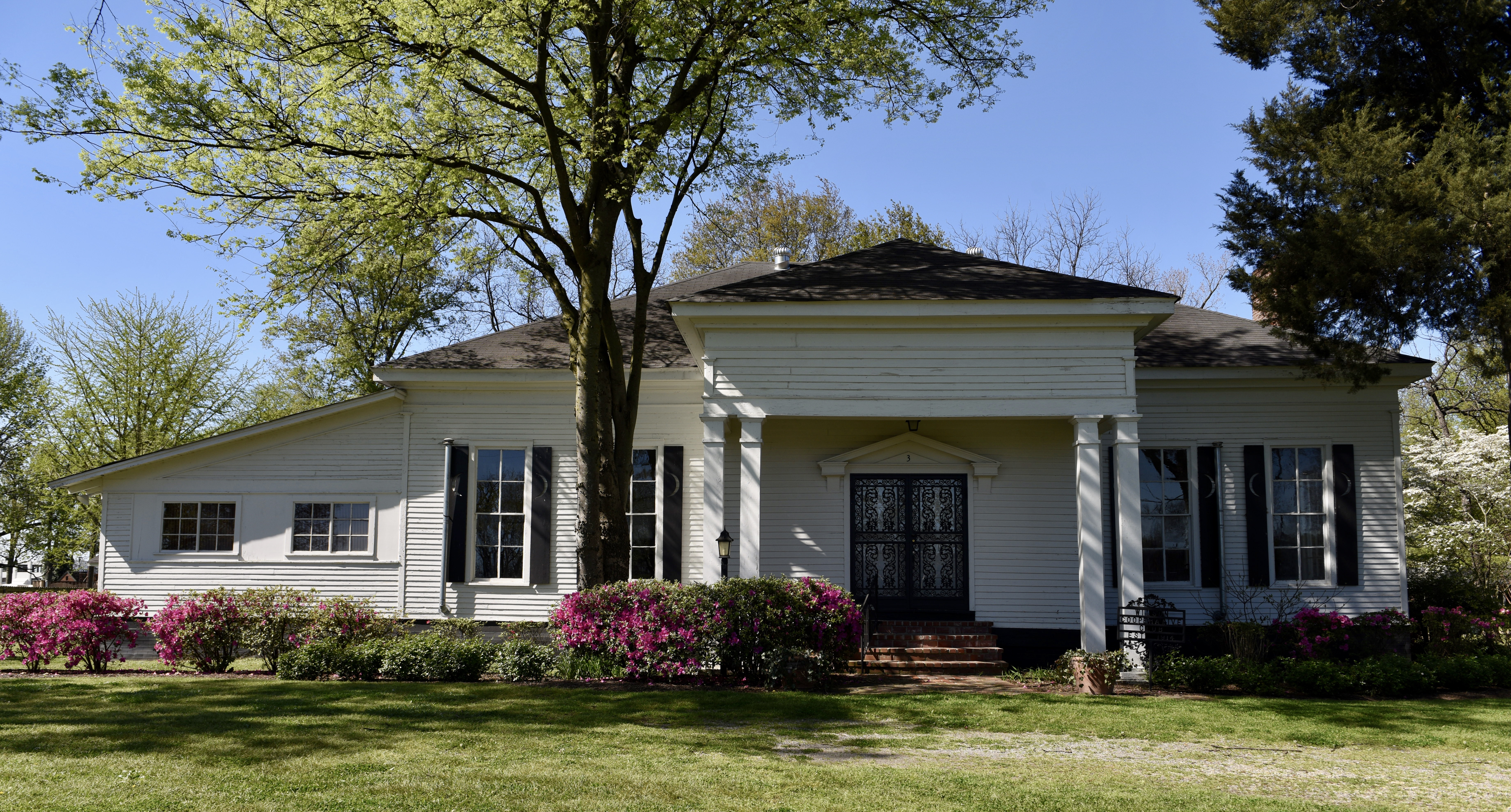

- Location within Arkansas Location within the United States
- Location: 10 Lake Dr. Wilson, Arkansas
- Coordinates: 35°34′14″N 90°2′28″W
- Area: less than one acre
- Built: 1906
- Architectural style: Colonial Revival
- NRHP reference No.: 15000285
- Added to NRHP: June 2, 2015

The Wilson Community House is a historic community meeting hall at 10 Lake Drive in Wilson, Arkansas. It is a single-story wood-frame structure, with a hip roof, weatherboard siding, and foundation of brick and stone piers. It has Colonial Revival styling, including a hip-roofed entrance portico with groups of supporting Doric columns, and four-over-four sash windows. It was built in 1906, and has served since then as a significant focal point for community events, with an early history including use as a church and school.

The building was listed on the National Register of Historic Places in 2015.

== See also ==
- National Register of Historic Places listings in Mississippi County, Arkansas
