= Zebree Homestead =

Archaeological site in Arkansas, United States

- U.S. National Register of Historic Places
- Nearest city: Buckeye, Arkansas
- Area: 3 acres (1.2 ha)
- NRHP reference No.: 75000398
- Added to NRHP: May 2, 1975

The Zebree Homestead is a prehistoric archaeological site in Mississippi County, Arkansas. The site contains evidence of a Late Woodland Period village, and is most significant as oldest known site of the Mississippian culture south of St. Louis. It appears to have been settled from Cahokia around 900 CE, with evidence of habitation and tool work, as well as a c. 1100 CE ditch and palisade.

The site was listed on the National Register of Historic Places in 1975.

== See also ==
- National Register of Historic Places listings in Mississippi County, Arkansas
