= Planters Bank Building (Osceola, Arkansas) =

- U.S. National Register of Historic Places
- U.S. Historic district – Contributing property
- Location within Arkansas Location within the United States
- Location: 200 E. Hale St., Osceola, Arkansas
- Coordinates: 35°42′9″N 89°58′1″W
- Area: less than one acre
- Built: 1920
- Architect: Branson, Uzell
- Architectural style: Classical Revival
- Part of: Hale Avenue Historic District (ID08000722)
- MPS: Osceola MRA
- NRHP reference No.: 87001354

Significant dates
- Added to NRHP: August 6, 1987
- Designated CP: August 1, 2008

The Planters Bank Building is a historic commercial building at 200 East Hale Street in downtown Osceola, Arkansas. It is a Classical Revival brick and mortar structure, designed by Missouri architect Uzell Singleton Branson and built c. 1920. It is one of the most architecturally sophisticated buildings in the city, which is otherwise dominated by vernacular early 20th-century commercial architecture. It has housed banks for most of its existence, although it briefly served as city hall in 1943–44.

The building was listed on the National Register of Historic Places in 1987.

== See also ==
- National Register of Historic Places listings in Mississippi County, Arkansas
