= Wilson Motor Company =

- U.S. National Register of Historic Places
- Location within Arkansas
- Location: 42 Cortez Kennedy Ave., Wilson, Arkansas
- Coordinates: 35°33′57″N 90°02′50″W
- Built: c.1930
- MPS: Arkansas Highway History and Architecture MPS
- NRHP reference No.: 100003332
- Added to NRHP: January 24, 2019

The Wilson Motor Company, at 42 Cortez Kennedy Ave. in Wilson, Arkansas, was listed on the National Register of Historic Places in 2019.

The building was an automobile dealership and filling station, built around 1930. It is unusual for its Tudor Revival style.
