= Mississippi County Courthouse (Blytheville, Arkansas) =

- Mississippi County Courthouse, Chickasawba District
- U.S. National Register of Historic Places
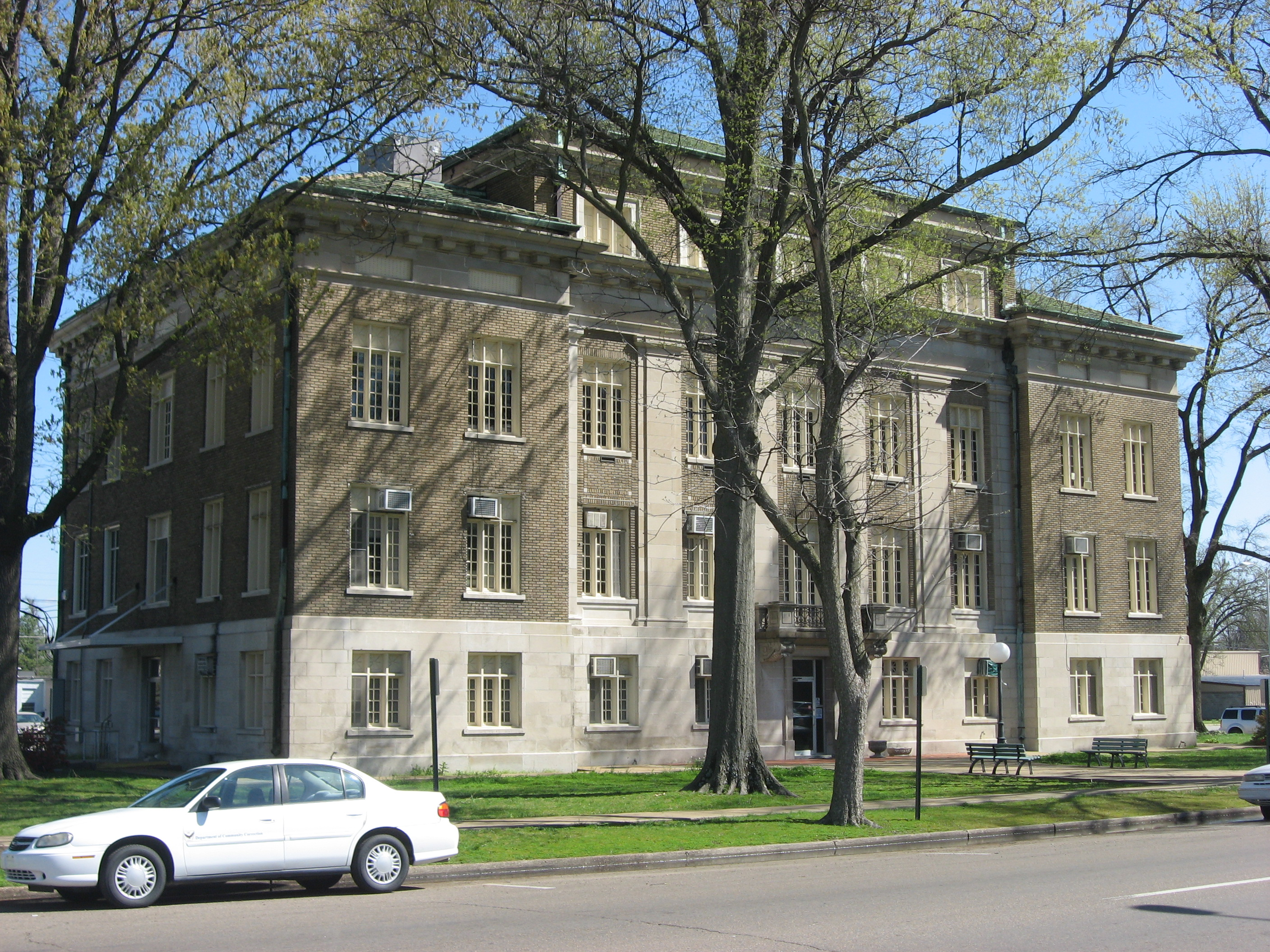

- Location within Arkansas Location within the United States
- Interactive map showing the location of Mississippi County Courthouse, Blytheville
- Location: 200 W. Walnut St., Blytheville, Arkansas
- Coordinates: 35°55′43″N 89°54′16″W
- Area: 1.5 acres (0.61 ha)
- Built: 1919
- Architect: Selligman and Ellesvard
- Architectural style: Colonial Revival
- NRHP reference No.: 96001411
- Added to NRHP: December 6, 1996

The Mississippi County Courthouse for the Chickasawba District is located at 200 West Walnut Street in Blytheville, Arkansas, one of Mississippi County's two seats (the other is Osceola). It is a 3 1/2-story brick-and-cut-sandstone structure, designed by the Pine Bluff firm of Selligman and Ellesvard, and built in 1919. It is a fine local example of Colonial Revival styling, with a recessed center entrance and a projecting modillioned cornice. The interior has had few alterations since its construction.

The building was listed on the National Register of Historic Places in 1996.

== See also ==
- Mississippi County Courthouse (Osceola, Arkansas), the county's other courthouse
- National Register of Historic Places listings in Mississippi County, Arkansas
