= Keiser, Arkansas =

Keiser, Arkansas Savage Crossing, Arkansas
- City
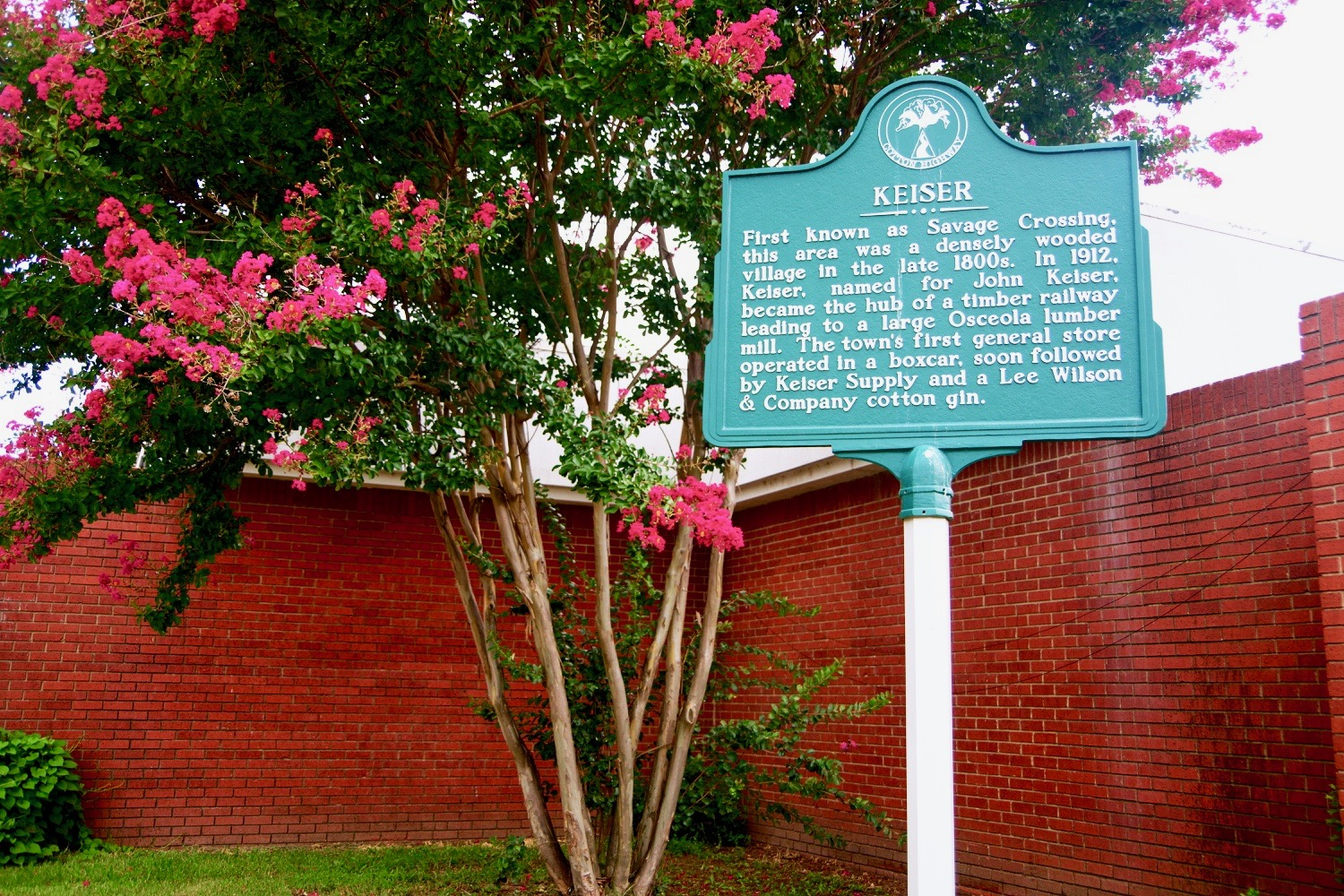
- Keiser historical marker at City Hall

- Location in Mississippi County, Arkansas
- Coordinates: 35°40′26″N 90°05′45″W
- Country: United States
- State: Arkansas
- County: Mississippi
- Incorporated: November 11, 1933
- Founder: Robert E. Lee Wilson
- Named for: John Keiser

Government
  - Mayor-elect: Eddie Gardener

Area
  - Total: 0.37 sq mi (0.96 km^{2})
  - Land: 0.37 sq mi (0.96 km^{2})
  - Water: 0 sq mi (0.00 km^{2})
- Elevation: 230 ft (70 m)

Population (2020)
  - Total: 751
  - Estimate (2025): 693 ▼
  - Density: 2,022.5/sq mi (780.91/km^{2})
- Time zone: UTC-6 (Central (CST))
  - Summer (DST): UTC-5 (CDT)
- ZIP code: 72351
- Area code: 870
- FIPS code: 05-36310
- GNIS feature ID: 2404819
- Website: www.cityofkeiserar.gov

Keiser is a city in Mississippi County, Arkansas, United States. The population was 751 at the 2020 census.

== History ==
Originally known as "Savage Crossing", Keiser was one of several cities established by prominent late-19th century planter and land developer Robert E. Lee Wilson. The city, which served as a logging outpost and stop on the rail line that connected Wilson and Jonesboro, was named for Wilson's friend, John Keiser. After the forests had been cleared, the city transitioned from a logging town to an agrarian community. The city of Keiser was formally incorporated in 1933.

The Arkansas Agricultural Experiment Station established a research farm near Keiser in 1957, and built a regional headquarters in Keiser, the Northeast Research and Extension Center, 1980.

== Geography ==
Keiser is located in central Mississippi County. The city is concentrated along a stretch of Arkansas Highway 181, 9 miles (14 km) southwest of Osceola and the same distance northwest of Wilson. Interstate 55 passes just southeast of the city, with access from Exit 44 (Highway 181).

According to the United States Census Bureau, the city has a total area of 0.4 square miles (1.0 km^{2}), all land.

=== Climate ===
The climate in this area is characterized by hot, humid summers and generally mild to cool winters. According to the Köppen Climate Classification system, Keiser has a humid subtropical climate, abbreviated "Cfa" on climate maps.

Climate data for Keiser, Arkansas (1991–2020 normals, extremes 1959–present)
Month	Jan	Feb	Mar	Apr	May	Jun	Jul	Aug	Sep	Oct	Nov	Dec	Year
Record high °F (°C)	75 (24)	81 (27)	88 (31)	96 (36)	98 (37)	102 (39)	106 (41)	105 (41)	102 (39)	98 (37)	92 (33)	78 (26)	106 (41)
Mean maximum °F (°C)	67.7 (19.8)	71.5 (21.9)	78.5 (25.8)	86.1 (30.1)	92.0 (33.3)	97.1 (36.2)	98.1 (36.7)	98.2 (36.8)	95.1 (35.1)	89.0 (31.7)	78.7 (25.9)	69.5 (20.8)	100.0 (37.8)
Mean daily maximum °F (°C)	47.3 (8.5)	52.0 (11.1)	61.0 (16.1)	71.9 (22.2)	81.1 (27.3)	89.1 (31.7)	91.1 (32.8)	90.3 (32.4)	84.9 (29.4)	74.5 (23.6)	60.7 (15.9)	50.7 (10.4)	71.2 (21.8)
Daily mean °F (°C)	39.0 (3.9)	43.0 (6.1)	51.4 (10.8)	61.8 (16.6)	71.5 (21.9)	79.7 (26.5)	82.1 (27.8)	80.5 (26.9)	73.8 (23.2)	62.7 (17.1)	50.9 (10.5)	42.4 (5.8)	61.6 (16.4)
Mean daily minimum °F (°C)	30.7 (−0.7)	34.1 (1.2)	41.7 (5.4)	51.6 (10.9)	61.8 (16.6)	70.3 (21.3)	73.1 (22.8)	70.6 (21.4)	62.7 (17.1)	50.9 (10.5)	41.0 (5.0)	34.1 (1.2)	51.9 (11.1)
Mean minimum °F (°C)	13.3 (−10.4)	17.6 (−8.0)	23.2 (−4.9)	34.6 (1.4)	46.2 (7.9)	58.9 (14.9)	63.5 (17.5)	59.6 (15.3)	46.3 (7.9)	33.9 (1.1)	24.9 (−3.9)	19.7 (−6.8)	10.8 (−11.8)
Record low °F (°C)	−9 (−23)	−3 (−19)	8 (−13)	24 (−4)	36 (2)	46 (8)	54 (12)	47 (8)	36 (2)	25 (−4)	12 (−11)	−10 (−23)	−10 (−23)
Average precipitation inches (mm)	4.10 (104)	4.50 (114)	5.02 (128)	5.47 (139)	5.52 (140)	4.05 (103)	3.94 (100)	3.03 (77)	3.34 (85)	3.98 (101)	4.33 (110)	4.90 (124)	52.18 (1,325)
Average snowfall inches (cm)	0.6 (1.5)	0.9 (2.3)	0.3 (0.76)	0.0 (0.0)	0.0 (0.0)	0.0 (0.0)	0.0 (0.0)	0.0 (0.0)	0.0 (0.0)	0.0 (0.0)	0.0 (0.0)	0.0 (0.0)	1.8 (4.6)
Average precipitation days (≥ 0.01 in)	10.4	8.9	10.6	9.6	10.4	8.4	8.1	6.7	6.8	8.1	8.9	9.7	106.6
Average snowy days (≥ 0.1 in)	0.2	0.7	0.1	0.0	0.0	0.0	0.0	0.0	0.0	0.0	0.0	0.0	1.0
Source: NOAA

== Demographics ==
Historical population
Census	Pop.	Note	%±
1940	452		—
1950	522		15.5%
1960	516		−1.1%
1970	688		33.3%
1980	962		39.8%
1990	805		−16.3%
2000	808		0.4%
2010	759		−6.1%
2020	751		−1.1%
2025 (est.)	693	▼	−7.7%
U.S. Decennial Census

As of the 2010 United States census, there were 759 people living in the city. The racial makeup of the city was 92.0% White, 5.1% Black, 0.4% Native American, 0.1% Asian, 0.4% from some other race and 0.9% from two or more races. 1.1% were Hispanic or Latino of any race.

As of the census of 2000, there were 808 people, 303 households, and 230 families living in the city. The population density was 2,239.3 inhabitants per square mile (864.6/km^{2}). There were 334 housing units at an average density of 925.7 per square mile (357.4/km^{2}). The racial makeup of the city was 92.45% White, 4.46% Black or African American, 1.73% Native American, 0.99% from other races, and 0.37% from two or more races. 2.85% of the population were Hispanic or Latino of any race.

There were 303 households, out of which 32.3% had children under the age of 18 living with them, 62.7% were married couples living together, 8.6% had a female householder with no husband present, and 23.8% were non-families. 20.8% of all households were made up of individuals, and 11.9% had someone living alone who was 65 years of age or older. The average household size was 2.67 and the average family size was 3.05.

In the city, the population was spread out, with 26.5% under the age of 18, 6.2% from 18 to 24, 28.0% from 25 to 44, 26.1% from 45 to 64, and 13.2% who were 65 years of age or older. The median age was 38 years. For every 100 females, there were 92.8 males. For every 100 females age 18 and over, there were 94.1 males.

The median income for a household in the city was $35,517, and the median income for a family was $36,940. Males had a median income of $27,679 versus $19,500 for females. The per capita income for the city was $14,769. About 10.4% of families and 10.8% of the population were below the poverty line, including 9.7% of those under age 18 and 21.8% of those age 65 or over.

== Education ==
Public education for elementary and secondary students is provided by the Rivercrest School District (formerly the Southern Mississippi County School District), which includes the Rivercrest (formerly Southern Mississippi County) Elementary School at Keiser. Students graduate from Rivercrest High School located near Wilson.

The Keiser school district merged into the South Mississippi district in 1968.

== Notable people ==
- Ed Bruce, country music songwriter and singer. He is known for penning the 1975 song "Mammas Don't Let Your Babies Grow Up to Be Cowboys".
- Narvel Felts, country music singer-songwriter (active 1957–1988), and was recognized by the Rockabilly Hall of Fame
