= Burdette, Arkansas =

- Town
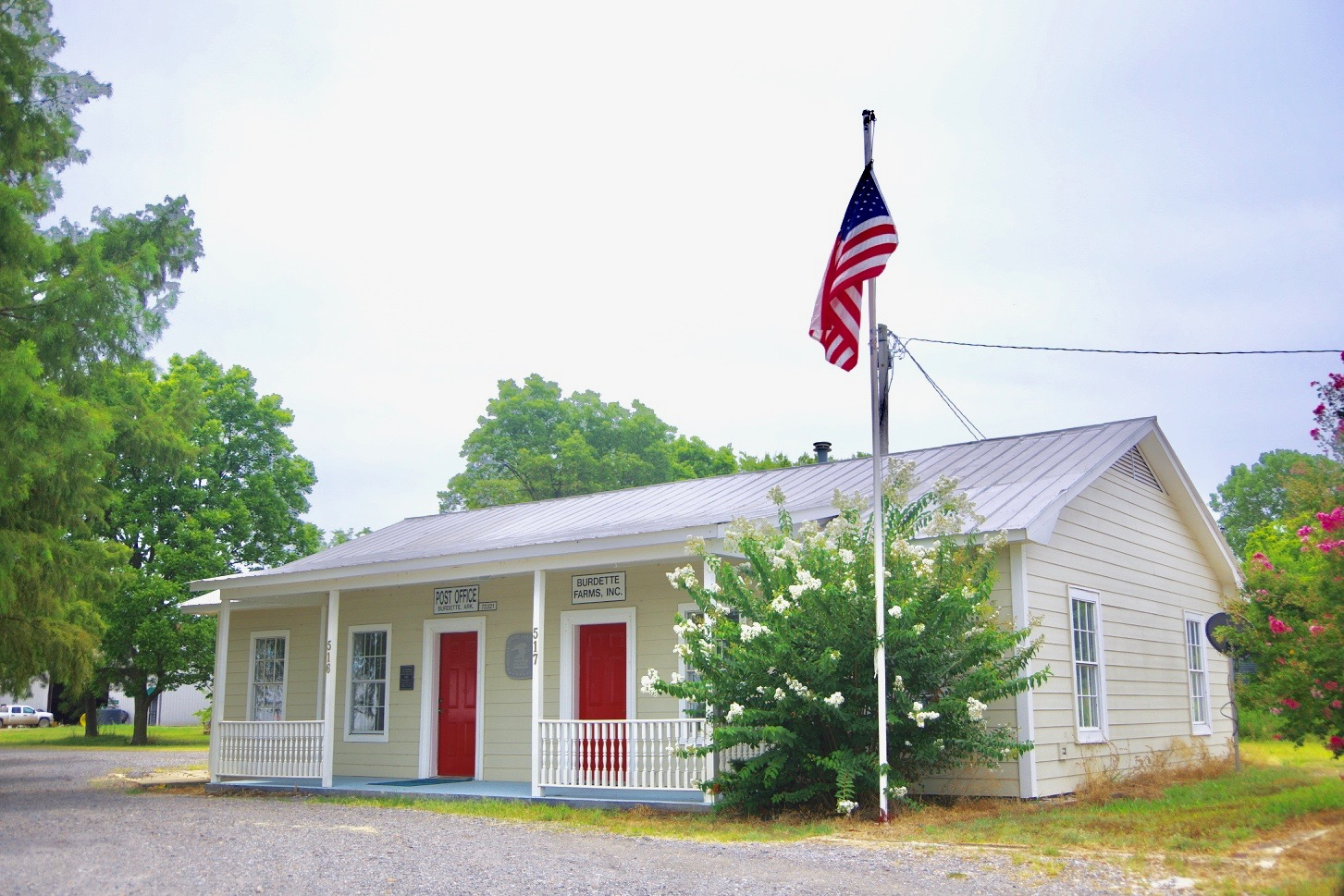
- Post office and Burdette Farms office

- Location in Mississippi County, Arkansas
- Coordinates: 35°48′55″N 89°56′47″W
- Country: United States
- State: Arkansas
- County: Mississippi
- Incorporated: May 10, 1905
- Named for: Alfred Burdette Wolverton

Area
  - Total: 0.74 sq mi (1.91 km^{2})
  - Land: 0.74 sq mi (1.91 km^{2})
  - Water: 0 sq mi (0.00 km^{2})
- Elevation: 240 ft (73 m)

Population (2020)
  - Total: 140
  - Estimate (2025): 139 ▼
  - Density: 189.9/sq mi (73.31/km^{2})
- Time zone: UTC-6 (Central (CST))
  - Summer (DST): UTC-5 (CDT)
- ZIP code: 72321
- Area code: 870
- FIPS code: 05-09880
- GNIS feature ID: 2405344

Burdette is a town in Mississippi County, Arkansas, United States. The population was 140 at the 2020 census, down from 191 in 2010.

== History ==
Burdette has its origins as a company town established by the Three States Lumber Company in the early 1900s. Incorporated in 1905, the town was named for Alfred Burdette Wolverton, an early logger in the area. Three States completed a large sawmill in Burdette in 1906. In 1907, the Blytheville, Burdette and Mississippi River Railway was formed to build a line from Wolverton Landing, on the Mississippi River, northward to Blytheville. This line also included a branch to Burdette.

A large agricultural operation, the Burdette Plantation, developed alongside the lumber operations. Beginning in the 1920s, these farms were utilized by the University of Arkansas for agricultural research focused on the improvement of cotton and corn yields. Several new cotton varieties, such as "Burdette Express" and "Burdette Lone Star", were developed in the Burdette area.

== Geography ==
Burdette is located in northeastern Mississippi County at 35°49′8″N 89°56′35″W (35.856818, -90.040113). The town is concentrated along Arkansas Highway 148, 5 miles (8 km) north of Luxora and 9 miles (14 km) south of Blytheville, and about 5 miles (8 km) northwest of the Mississippi River. The town's municipal boundaries stretch westward along AR 148 to Interstate 55 and eastward to U.S. Route 61.

According to the United States Census Bureau, Burdette has a total area of 0.74 square miles (1.92 km^{2}), all land.

== Demographics ==
Historical population
Census	Pop.	Note	%±
1920	100		—
1930	155		55.0%
1940	110		−29.0%
1950	122		10.9%
1960	115		−5.7%
1970	173		50.4%
1980	328		89.6%
1990	148		−54.9%
2000	129		−12.8%
2010	191		48.1%
2020	140		−26.7%
2025 (est.)	139	▼	−0.7%
U.S. Decennial Census; 2014 Estimate

As of the 2010 United States census, there were 191 people living in the town. The racial makeup of the town was 70.7% White, 20.9% Black, and 8.4% were Hispanic or Latino of any race.

As of the census of 2000, there were 129 people, 52 households, and 35 families living in the town. The population density was 75.5 people/km^{2} (196 people/mi^{2}). There were 57 housing units at an average density of 33.3 units/km^{2} (86 units/mi^{2}). The racial makeup of the town was 82.17% White, 17.05% Black or African American, and 0.78% from two or more races.

There were 52 households, out of which 25.0% had children under the age of 18 living with them, 57.7% were married couples living together, 3.8% had a female householder with no husband present, and 30.8% were non-families. 30.8% of all households were made up of individuals, and 1.9% had someone living alone who was 65 years of age or older. The average household size was 2.48 and the average family size was 3.06.

In the town, the population was spread out, with 23.3% under the age of 18, 8.5% from 18 to 24, 25.6% from 25 to 44, 35.7% from 45 to 64, and 7.0% who were 65 years of age or older. The median age was 40 years. For every 100 females, there were 101.6 males. For every 100 females age 18 and over, there were 115.2 males.

The median income for a household in the town was $40,625, and the median income for a family was $49,375. Males had a median income of $29,500 versus $9,250 for females. The per capita income for the town was $18,958. There were 10.3% of families and 11.2% of the population living below the poverty line, including 11.1% of under eighteens and none of those over 64.

== Education ==
The town is served by Blytheville School District, including Blytheville High School.

The Burdette school district merged into the Blytheville district in 1971.
