= Mississippi County Courthouse (Osceola, Arkansas) =

- U.S. National Register of Historic Places
- U.S. Historic district – Contributing property
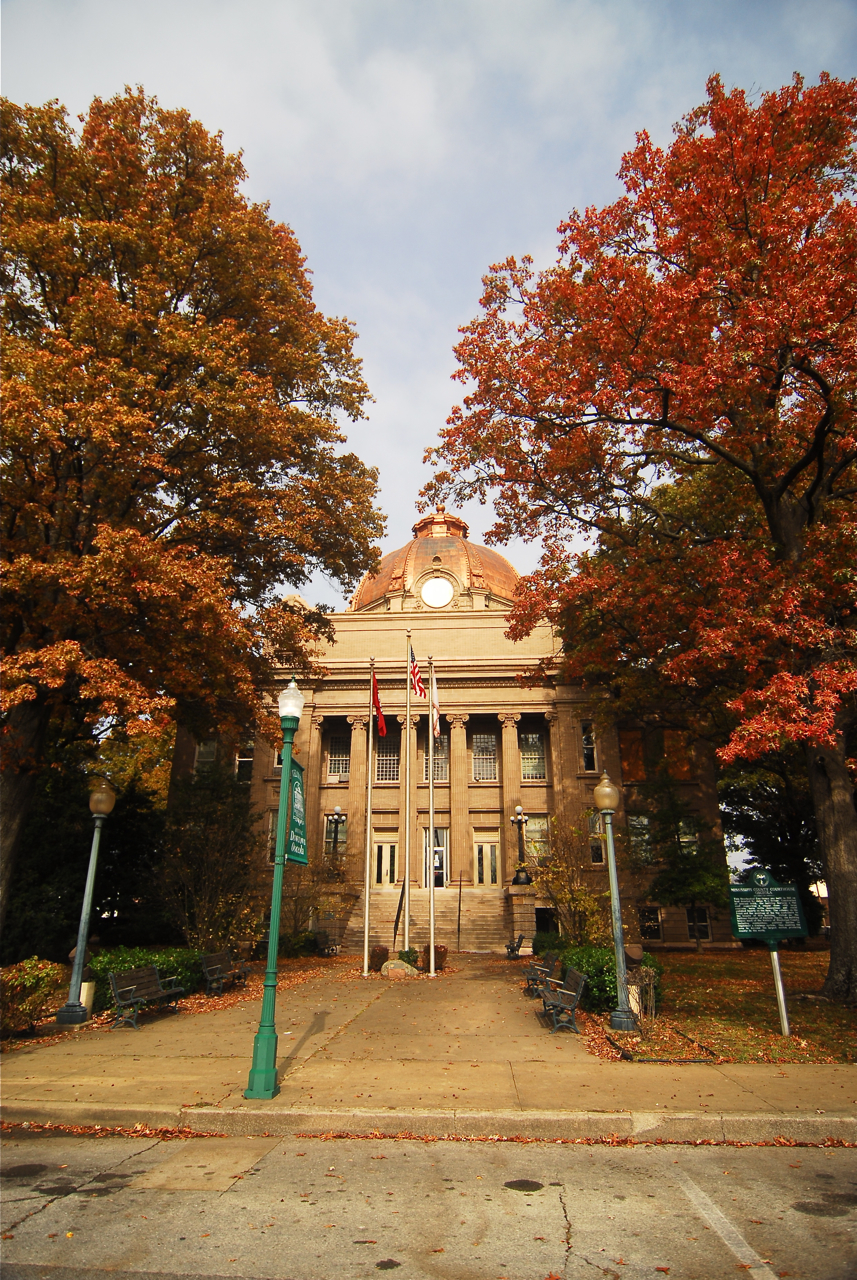
- Mississippi County Courthouse, November 2010

- Location within Arkansas Location within the United States
- Interactive map showing the location of Mississippi County Courthouse, Osceola
- Location: Hale and Poplar Aves., Osceola, Arkansas
- Coordinates: 35°42′11″N 89°58′9″W
- Area: less than one acre
- Built: 1912
- Built by: Falls Construction Co.
- Architect: John Gainsford
- Architectural style: Classical Revival
- Part of: Hale Avenue Historic District (ID08000722)
- NRHP reference No.: 78000612

Significant dates
- Added to NRHP: December 13, 1978
- Designated CP: August 1, 2008

The Mississippi County Courthouse is a courthouse at Poplar Street and Hale Avenue in Osceola, Arkansas, United States, one of two county seats of Mississippi County, built in 1912. It was listed on the National Register of Historic Places in 1978. The courthouse was built in the Classic Revival style by John Gainsford and anchors the Osceola town square.

== Architecture ==
The entire first floor of the courthouse is windowless because it originally housed the county jail. Large outdoor stairs ascend to a second story entrance. Baked stone tiles make up the floors, with various colors being used throughout the building. The exterior of the courthouse consists of long, slender bricks. A copper dome is encircled by several terra cotta decorations. In 2020, a team of copper roofing specialists with Renaissance Roofing worked to restore the dome to its former glory.

== See also ==
- Mississippi County Courthouse, Chickasawba District, Mississippi County's other courthouse in Blytheville
- National Register of Historic Places listings in Mississippi County, Arkansas
