= Hale Avenue Historic District =

Historic district in Arkansas, United States

- U.S. National Register of Historic Places
- U.S. Historic district
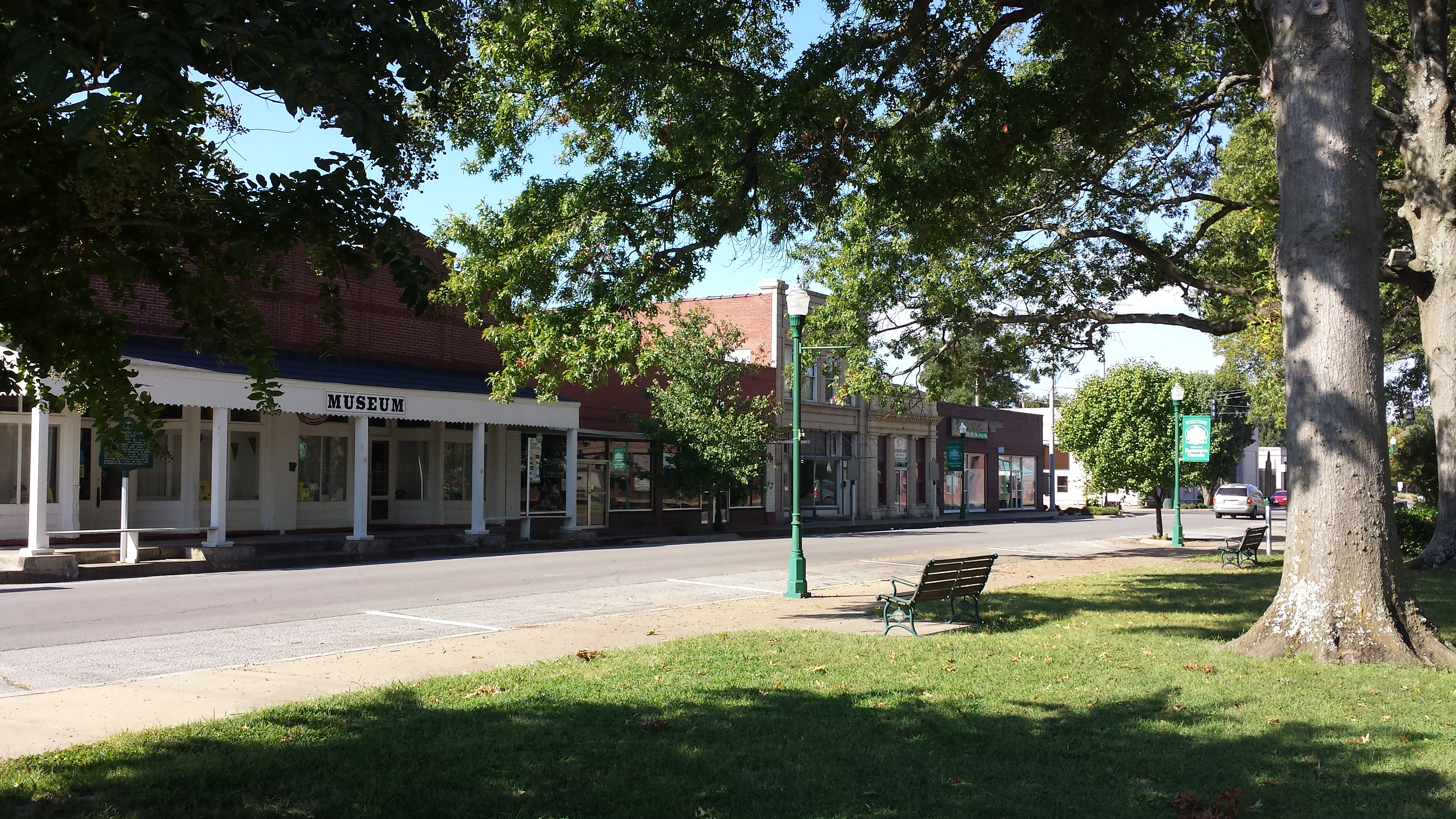
- The original Hale Avenue Historic District as viewed from the Mississippi County Courthouse grounds

- Location within Arkansas Location within the United States
- Location: Hale Ave between Maple St and Ash St; Pecan St between Johnson Ave and Ford Ave; Poplar St between Johnson Ave and Hale St, Osceola, Arkansas
- Coordinates: 35°42′9″N 89°58′10″W
- Area: 3 acres (1.2 ha)
- Built: 1900-1920s
- Architectural style: Early Commercial, Art Deco
- MPS: Osceola MRA
- NRHP reference No.: 87001349 (original); 03000863 (increase 1); 08000722 (increase 2)

Significant dates
- Added to NRHP: September 14, 1987
- Boundary increases: September 2, 2003; August 1, 2008

The Hale Avenue Historic District encompasses a significant portion of the central business district of Osceola, Arkansas. It extends for five blocks along Hale Avenue, between Ash and Maple Streets, and includes a few buildings on adjacent streets. The focal point of the district is the Mississippi County Courthouse, and the block of buildings opposite it on Hale Avenue. Although Osceola was founded in 1875, it was relocated beginning in 1900 to be closer to the railroad, with Hale Avenue as the major east–west route. This began a period of growth in the city which continued through much of the 1920s. Most of buildings on these blocks of Hale Avenue result from this time, and a number of those built later were built in an architecturally sympathetic manner.

When first listed on the National Register of Historic Places, the district included just six buildings on the 200 block of West Hale Avenue. This was expanded to include three buildings on the 100 block of West Hale, and then enlarged to its present size in 2008. This expanded district includes six properties that were individually listed.

== See also ==
- National Register of Historic Places listings in Mississippi County, Arkansas
