= Arkansas Highway 77 =

State highway in Arkansas, United States

Highway 77

Route information
- Maintained by ArDOT
- Length: 66.381 mi (106.830 km)
- Existed: April 1, 1926–present

Major junctions
- South end: US 70 in West Memphis
- I-40 / I-55 / US 61 / US 64 / US 78 / US 79 in West Memphis; I-55 / US 61 / US 78 in Turrell; I-555 in Gilmore; US 78 / AR 18 in Manila
- North end: Route 108 at the Missouri state line in Arkmo

Location
- Country: United States
- State: Arkansas
- Counties: Crittenden, Mississippi

Highway system
- Arkansas Highway System; Interstate; US; State; Business; Spurs; Suffixed; Scenic; Heritage
← AR 76	→ US 78

Highway 77 (AR 77, Ark. 77, and Hwy. 77) is a north–south state highway in Northeast Arkansas. The route of 66.70 miles (107.34 km) runs from US Highway 70 (US 70) in West Memphis north through small towns and agricultural areas of the Arkansas Delta to Missouri Route 108 at the Missouri state line. It is generally a low-traffic road except in West Memphis. Created during the 1926 Arkansas state highway numbering, the route was extended in the 1950s and 1960s, including along a former alignment of US 61. AR 77 does not have any spur or business routes.

Between West Memphis and Turrell, the highway is part of the Great River Road National Scenic Byway. The route is maintained by the Arkansas Department of Transportation (ArDOT).

== Route description ==
ArDOT maintains AR 77 as part of the state highway system. ArDOT estimates the traffic level for a segment of roadway was highest just south of the I-40 junction in West Memphis, estimated at 21,000 vehicles per day in 2021, on average. It dropped to 15,000 VPD north of the interstate and continues to drop north, to 8,800 VPD, 1,400 VPD at James Mill, to 820 at Turrell. In Mississippi County, traffic was below 400 VPD south of Athelstan, and ranges between 440-1800 north of it (excluding concurrencies). For reference, roads under 400 VPD are classified as "very low volume local road" by the American Association of State Highway and Transportation Officials (AASHTO).

A small segment of AR 77 in West Memphis is part of the National Highway System (NHS), a network of roads important to the nation's economy, defense, and mobility.

AR 77 begins at US 70 (Broadway/Great River Road) in West Memphis, a suburb within the Memphis metropolitan area. The route runs north as Missouri Street and the Great River Road, beginning near the Wilson Power and Light Company Ice Plant and one block north of the former West Memphis City Hall. Continuing through a commercial area, AR 77 crosses Ten Mile Bayou and passes West Memphis Christian School before an intersection with I-40/I-55/US 61/US 64/US 78/US 79. The highway passes underneath the freeway, briefly jogging along a service road and crossing the BNSF Railway before continuing northbound. Now in an industrial area known as Pressley Junction, AR 77 serves as the northern terminus of AR 191 (7th Street) before crossing the Union Pacific Railway tracks and entering Marion. AR 77/GRR wind through the city to downtown Marion, where it intersects Military Road, which goes to US 64 near Marion City Hall. Continuing northbound, AR 77/GRR passes the historic Marion Colored High School in the small town of Sunset.

The highway continues north, paralleling the BNSF railway into a rural area, passing through the small communities of James Mill, Jericho, and Clarkedale, serving as the eastern terminus of AR 50 (Clarkedale Road) in the latter. Continuing north, AR 77/GRR passes along the west side of the Wapanocca National Wildlife Refuge (NWR), crossing Big Creek, entering the city of Turrell, and intersecting AR 42, which serves as the entrance to the NWR. The routes run along the west side of Turrell, passing the former Turrell High School before entering a large interchange. AR 77 first intersects US 61, with the Great River Road turning onto US 61 north, as well as an on-ramp to I-55 southbound/US 78 eastbound. US 61/AR 77 continue north to an on-ramp to I-55/US 61 northbound/US 78 westbound; now alone, AR 77 becomes an on-ramp for the beginning of I-555. The two routes run together as a freeway to exit 2, where AR 77 exits I-555 east into Gilmore. The route then turns south and runs as a frontage road along I-555, curving along I-55/US 78 and eventually becoming a section line road facing due north toward Mississippi County.

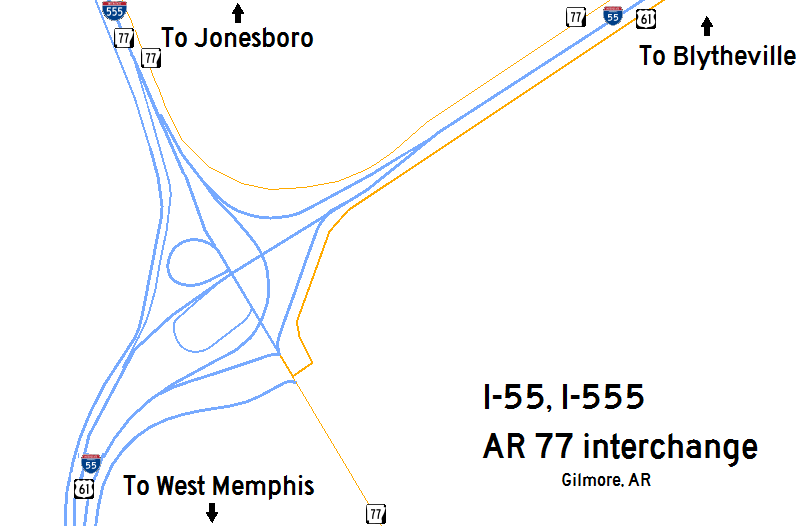
Diagram of the Lake David Interchange with I-55/US 61 (now with US 78 since November 2023) exit 23: AR 77 meets I-55/US 61/US 78 and becomes I-55/US 61/US 78/AR 77, with I-555 heading northwest

AR 77 passes through a rural area of the Arkansas Delta, briefly overlapping AR 308 near Birdsong and crossing AR 118 and the Tyronza River. It passes near the Johnny Cash Boyhood Home before a junction with AR 14. Continuing north, AR 77 serves as the eastern of both AR 198 near Bondsville and AR 297 near West Ridge. The route turns right at AR 140 in Etowah, forming a concurrency eastbound to Athelstan, where AR 77 turns left, breaking the concurrency. Continuing northbound, AR 77 serves as the eastern terminus of AR 136 at Carroll's Corner, briefly overlaps AR 158 at Floodway, passes through the unincorporated community of Shady Grove, and forms a short overlap with US 78/AR 18 in the small town of Manila. AR 77 continues north to a junction with AR 119 at Poplar Corner. The two routes form a wrong-way concurrency westbound to Leachville, where the concurrency ends at Main Street, with AR 77 turning north and continuing to the Missouri state line, where the road continues as Route 108.

== History ==
Highway 77 was created in the 1926 Arkansas state highway numbering as one of the original state highways between State Road 40 between Etowah and West Ridge and Missouri. The southern terminus was switched from West Ridge to Athelstan on the 1952 state highway map.

A year later, a second segment of AR 77 was created between US 61 north of Turrell and Denwood. On July 29, 1953, the Arkansas State Highway Commission extended the route along AR 14 and south to an area near Whitton. The route was extended along a former alignment of US 61 between Turrell and West Memphis on August 22, 1956. In the 1960s, AR 77 was rerouted around downtown Manila, with the former alignment becoming AR 18 Business (AR 18B). On April 24, 1968, AR 77 was realigned onto a county road and replaced part of AR 136 through Bondsville at the request of the Mississippi county judge.

A minor realignment took place at Manila following construction of a new AR 18 bypass in 2014.

== Major intersections ==
Mile markers reset at concurrencies.

County	Location	mi (Note: Although highways in the United States run from south to north and west to east, ArDOT lists mileposts running from north to south.)	km	Exit	Destinations	Notes
Crittenden	West Memphis	17.845	28.719		US 70 / Great River Road south (Broadway Avenue)	Southern terminus; south end of GRR overlap
Crittenden	West Memphis	16.27	26.18		I-40 / I-55 (US 61 / US 64 / US 78 / US 79) – Little Rock, Blytheville, Memphis	I-40 exits 276 (eastbound) and 278 (westbound); I-55 exit 7 (southbound)
Crittenden	West Memphis	15.83	25.48		AR 191 south (7th Street) to I-40 / I-55 / AFCO Road	
Crittenden	Marion	12.81	20.62		Military Road / Mound City Road to I-55 / US 64 west (Note: Military Road west of Highway 77 is US 64, even though the route also concurs with I-55/US 61/US 78 west of the intersection. This is a leftover alignment prior to building I-55.)	
Crittenden	Clarkedale	5.89	9.48		AR 50 west (Clarkedale Road)	
Crittenden	Turrell	1.87	3.01		AR 42 to I-55 – Turrell Business District, Wapanocca NWR Headquarters	
Crittenden	Turrell	0.00	0.00		US 61 north (Great River Road) to I-55 south (US 61 south / US 78 east) – Wilson, Marion, West Memphis	South end of US 61 overlap; north end of GRR overlap
Crittenden	Turrell	0.00	0.00	Southern end of freeway section		
Crittenden	Turrell			1	I-55 (US 61 south / US 78) – Memphis, Blytheville I-555 begins	North end of US 61 overlap; southern terminus of I-555; I-55 exits 23B-A; signed as exits 1B (north) and 1A (south); exit no. not signed northbound; no northbound access to I-55 south
Crittenden	Gilmore	24.144	38.856	2	I-555 north – Marked Tree, Jonesboro, Gilmore	North end of I-555 overlap; access to Gilmore via Menesha Street
Crittenden	Gilmore	24.144	38.856	Northern end of freeway section		
Mississippi	Dimple	16.82	27.07		AR 308 west – Birdsong	South end of AR 308 overlap
Mississippi		15.90	25.59		AR 308 east – Frenchman's Bayou	North end of AR 308 overlap
Mississippi		13.38	21.53		AR 118 – Tyronza, Joiner	
Mississippi		6.87	11.06		AR 14 – Lepanto, Wilson	
Mississippi		4.39	7.07		AR 198 west	
Mississippi		1.01	1.63		AR 297 south / CR 732 east	
Mississippi	Etowah	0.000	0.000		AR 140 west – Lepanto	South end of AR 140 overlap (Note: Although Arkansas highways normally terminate when intersected by a route of greater importance, Highway 77 in Mississippi County ends when intersecting Highway 140 because the route was formerly numbered AR 40 prior to creation of I-40.)
Mississippi	Athelstan	12.189	19.616		AR 140 east / CR 209 south – Osceola	North end of AR 140 overlap
Mississippi	Carroll's Corner	10.10	16.25		AR 136 west – Etowah	
Mississippi		8.19	13.18		AR 158 east – Luxora	South end of AR 158 overlap
Mississippi	Floodway	6.67	10.73		AR 158 west – Caraway	North end of AR 158 overlap
Mississippi		0.000	0.000		US 78 east / AR 18 east – Blytheville	South end of US 78/AR 18 overlap
Mississippi	Manila	12.203	19.639		US 78 west / AR 18 west	North end of US 78/AR 18 overlap
Mississippi	Manila	11.93	19.20		AR 18B west (West Lake Street)	Former routing of AR 77
Mississippi	Poplar Corner	8.90	14.32		AR 119 north / CR 180 east – Buckeye	South end of AR 119 overlap
Mississippi	Leachville	4.27	6.87		AR 119 south (Main Street) – Jonesboro	North end of AR 119 overlap
Mississippi	Arkmo	0.000	0.000		Route 108 north – Cardwell	Continuation into Missouri
1.000 mi = 1.609 km; 1.000 km = 0.621 mi: Concurrency terminus

== See also ==
- List of state highways in Arkansas
