= Arkansas Highway 118 =

Highway in Arkansas

Highway 118
- AR 118 highlighted in red

Route information
- Maintained by ArDOT

Section 1
- Length: 41.43 mi (66.68 km)
- West end: US 64 / AR 149 in Earle
- East end: CR 495 at Black Cat Landing

Section 2
- Length: 4.29 mi (6.90 km)
- West end: US 70 in West Memphis
- East end: US 64 in Marion

Location
- Country: United States
- State: Arkansas
- Counties: Crittenden, Poinsett, Mississippi

Highway system
- Arkansas Highway System; Interstate; US; State; Business; Spurs; Suffixed; Scenic; Heritage
← AR 117	→ AR 119

Arkansas Highway 118 (AR 118) is a designation for two state highways in the Upper Arkansas Delta. One segment of 41.43 miles (66.68 km) runs from U.S. Route 64 (US 64) east to Mississippi County Road 495 near the Mississippi River levee. A second segment of 4.29 miles (6.90 km) runs from US 70 in West Memphis north to US 64 in Marion. Both routes are maintained by the Arkansas State Highway and Transportation Department (AHTD).

== Route description ==
=== Earle to Joiner ===
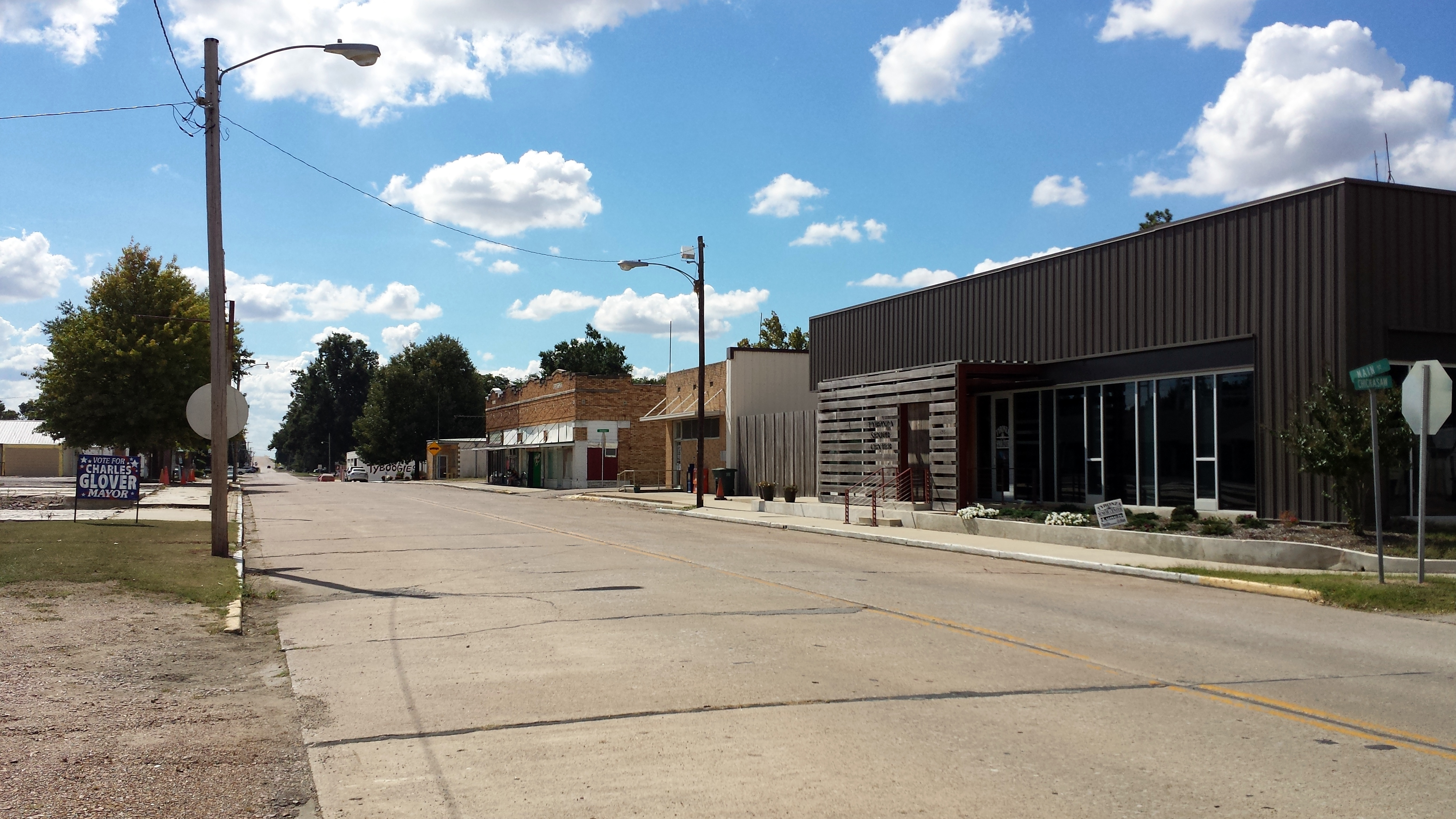
Highway 118 in Tyronza

Highway 118 begins at US 64 in the northeast corner of Earle within Crittenden County in the Arkansas Delta. The route runs northeast to Heafer, where it has an intersection with Highway 42 before curving due north and running as a section line road and entering Poinsett County.

Entering Poinsett County, Highway 118 runs north to Highway 322, which serves as a frontage road for Interstate 555 in southern Tyronza. Highway 118 meets I-555 at an exit before entering downtown Tyronza. The highway passes three historic properties and continues north before turning due east and entering Mississippi County.

Now heading west, AR 118 meets AR 135, AR 308, and AR 77 before crossing Interstate 55. After I-55, AR meets US 61 in Joiner. The route continues east to Black Cat, the Mississippi River and Tennessee.

=== West Memphis to Marion ===
Highway 118 begins at US 70 in West Memphis near Mid-South Community College. The route heads north to an interchange with Interstate 40 (I-40), as well as unsigned US 79. The highway continues north to Marion, running along the western city limits before an intersection with US 64.

== Major intersections ==
County	Location	mi	km	Destinations	Notes
Crittenden	Earle	0.00	0.00	US 64 / AR 149 south (Second St) – Parkin, Crawfordsville	Western terminus
Crittenden	Heafer	9.42	15.16	AR 42 – Turrell	
Poinsett	Tyronza	17.30	27.84	AR 322 west – Mount Olive	
Poinsett	Tyronza	17.42	28.03	I-555 – Memphis, Jonesboro	
Poinsett		21.50	34.60	AR 135 – Tyronza, Lepanto	
Mississippi	Whitton	24.51	39.45	AR 308 east – Birdsong	AR 308 western terminus
Mississippi		25.77	41.47	AR 77 – Turrell, Etowah	
Mississippi		29.92	48.15	I-55 – Turrell, Blytheville	
Mississippi	Joiner	31.74	51.08	US 61 – Frenchman's Bayou, Wilson	
Mississippi	Black Cat Landing	41.43	66.68	CR 495	Eastern terminus
Gap in route
Crittenden	West Memphis	0.00	0.00	US 70 (Broadway Ave) – Jennette, Memphis	Western terminus
Crittenden	West Memphis	0.99	1.59	I-40 (US 79) to I-55 – Memphis, Little Rock	
Crittenden	Marion	4.29	6.90	US 64 (Old Military Rd) – Crawfordsville	Eastern terminus
1.000 mi = 1.609 km; 1.000 km = 0.621 mi: Concurrency terminus

== See also ==
- List of state highways in Arkansas
