= Arkansas Highway 158 =

State highway in Arkansas, United States

Highway 158

Route information
- Maintained by ArDOT
- Existed: 1936–present

Section 1
- Length: 44.24 mi (71.20 km)
- South end: AR 1, Greenfield
- North end: US 61, Luxora

Section 2
- Length: 0.33 mi (530 m)
- South end: US 49
- North end: agricultural facility

Location
- Country: United States
- State: Arkansas

Highway system
- Arkansas Highway System; Interstate; US; State; Business; Spurs; Suffixed; Scenic; Heritage
← AR 157	→ AR 159

Arkansas Highway 158 (AR 158, Hwy. 158) is a designation for two state highways in northeast Arkansas. The main segment of 44.24 miles (71.20 km) runs east from Highway 1 to US Route 61 (US 61) in Luxora. A short route of 0.33 miles (0.53 km) runs from U.S. Route 49 across railroad tracks in rural Craighead County.

== Route description ==
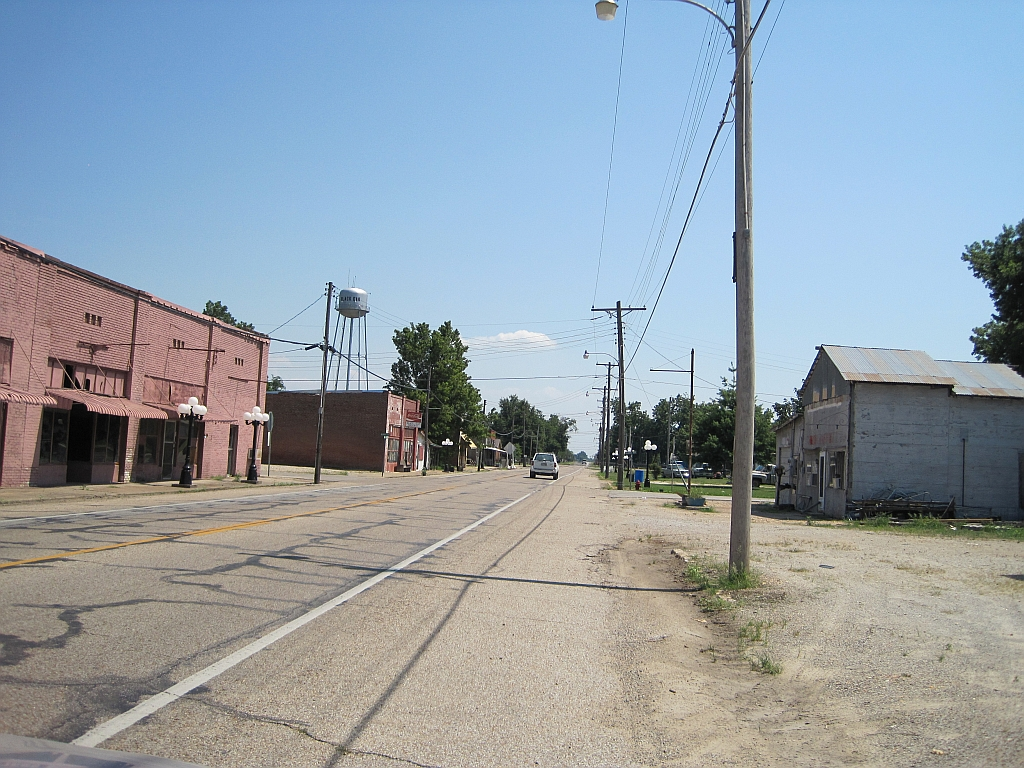
Highway 158 serves Black Oak

=== Greenfield to Luxora ===
AR 158 begins at AR 1 in Greenfield. The route runs east and begins to concur with AR 163 north. AR 158 then heads east, crossing US 63 and AR 463 near Bay. The route continues east then north to meet AR 18 in Bowman. AR 18/AR 135/AR 158 run together until Black Oak, with AR 135/AR 158 continuing together until Caraway.

The route continues east to meet AR 77 in Lennie. AR 158 runs east to cross Interstate 55 and US 61 before Luxora. The route terminates at US 61 in north Luxora.

=== Craighead County ===
The route begins at US 49 and runs briefly east across the Union Pacific Railroad tracks. The route then curves north parallel to US 49, with the roadway terminating at an agricultural facility.

== History ==
The route was first designated AR 158 in 1936. The highways was a gravel/stone road from AR 77 east to Luxora. The route was extended west to the Caraway area in 1952, but remained entirely gravel. A segment of AR 158 was added from Bay to Lunsford around 1960. The short route was added to the state highway system in 1979.

== Major intersections ==
Mile markers reset at concurrencies.

County	Location	mi	km	Destinations	Notes
Poinsett	Greenfield	0	0.0	AR 1	Western terminus
Poinsett		2.9	4.7	AR 163 south	AR 163 concurrency begins
AR 163 concurrency north, 7.0 miles (11.3 km)
Craighead		0	0.0	AR 163 north – Jonesboro	AR 163 concurrency ends
Craighead	Bay	5.4	8.7	AR 463 north – Jonesboro	AR 463 concurrency begins
Craighead	Bay	AR 463 concurrency south, 1.4 miles (2.3 km)			
Craighead	Bay	0	0.0	AR 463 south – Trumann	AR 463 concurrency ends
Craighead	Lunsford	5.6	9.0	AR 69 south (Trumann Hwy) – Trumann	AR 69 northern terminus
Craighead	Lake City	10.5	16.9	US 78 west / AR 18 west – Jonesboro	Concurrency begins
Craighead	US 78 / AR 18 / AR 135 concurrency east, 14.8 miles (23.8 km)				
Craighead	Caraway	0	0.0	AR 135 south – Lepanto	Concurrency ends
Craighead	Caraway	1.0	1.6	AR 139 north (N New York Ave) – Monette	AR 139 southern terminus
Mississippi	Floodway	11.0	17.7	AR 77 north – Manila	AR 77 concurrency begins
Mississippi	AR 77 concurrency south, 1.5 miles (2.4 km)				
Mississippi		0	0.0	AR 77 south to AR 140 – Carrolls Corner, Athelstan	AR 77 concurrency ends
Mississippi		5.9	9.5	AR 181	
Mississippi		8.0	12.9	AR 119 south to AR 140	AR 191 northern terminus
Mississippi		9.4	15.1	I-55 – Blytheville, Memphis	
Mississippi	New Salem	11.0	17.7	AR 325 south	AR 325 northern terminus
Mississippi	Luxora	13.5	21.7	US 61 – Blytheville, Osceola	
Mississippi	Luxora	14.8	23.8	US 61 – Blytheville	Eastern terminus
AR 158 main segment ends, AR 158 rural segment begins at U.S. Route 49
Poinsett–Craighead county line		0	0.0	US 49	Southern terminus
Craighead		0.3	0.48	Agricultural facility	Northern terminus
1.000 mi = 1.609 km; 1.000 km = 0.621 mi

== See also ==
- List of state highways in Arkansas
