= Arkansas Highway 308 =

State highway in Arkansas, United States

Highway 308

Route information
- Maintained by ArDOT
- Existed: April 24, 1963–present

Section 1
- Length: 6.216 mi (10.004 km)
- West end: AR 149 in Marked Tree
- East end: AR 135 at Spear Lake

Section 2
- Length: 10.940 mi (17.606 km)
- West end: AR 118 at Whitton
- East end: US 61 at Frenchman's Bayou

Location
- Country: United States
- State: Arkansas
- Counties: Poinsett, Mississippi

Highway system
- Arkansas Highway System; Interstate; US; State; Business; Spurs; Suffixed; Scenic; Heritage
← AR 307	→ AR 309

Highway 308 (AR 308, Ark. 308, and Hwy. 308) is a designation for two east–west state highways in Northeast Arkansas. One segment runs east from AR 149 in Marked Tree to Spear Lake. A second route, of 10.94 miles (17.61 km) begins at Highway 118 at Whitton and runs east to US 61 at Frenchman's Bayou. The highway also includes a business route and spur route in Marked Tree. All four routes are maintained by the Arkansas Department of Transportation (ArDOT).

== Route description ==
ArDOT maintains both segments of AR 308 as part of the state highway system. ArDOT estimates the traffic level for a segment of roadway was highest near the western terminus in Marked Tree, estimated at 930 vehicles per day in 2021, on average. It drops to 220 VPD north of the Marked Tree Municipal Airport. The Mississippi County segment is highest near Whitton at 120 VPD. For reference, roads under 400 VPD are classified as "very low volume local road" by the American Association of State Highway and Transportation Officials (AASHTO).

No segment of AR 308 is part of the National Highway System (NHS), a network of roads important to the nation's economy, defense, and mobility.

=== Marked Tree to Spear Lake ===
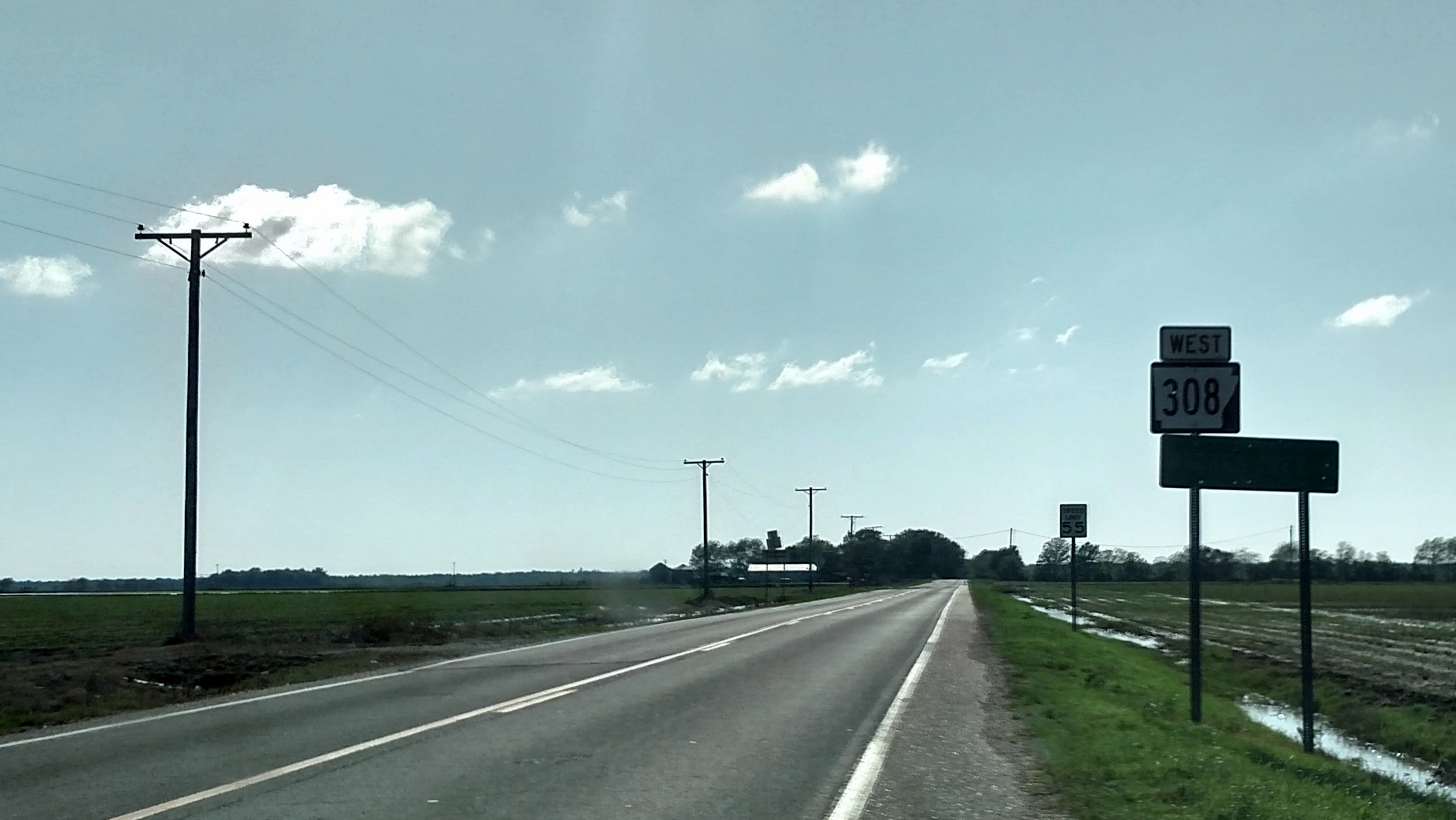
First Highway 308 reassurance marker west of Spear Lake

Highway 308 begins at Highway 149 (10th Street / Frisco Street) in Marked Tree, a small town within the Arkansas Delta, a flat and fertile agricultural region. The route passes under the BNSF Railway tracks and curves past an industrial area before turning due north. Now forming the western boundary of the Marked Tree Municipal Airport, the route serves as the western terminus of Highway 308 Spur. Continuing north, Highway 308 serves as the eastern terminus of Highway 308 Business (Elm Street), which runs into the Marked Tree Business District before exiting the city eastbound. Highway 308 runs east through an agricultural area to an intersection with Highway 135 at the unincorporated community of Spear Lake, where it terminates.

=== Whitton to Frenchman's Bayou ===
A second segment of Highway 308 runs in a rural part of Northeast Arkansas. The highway begins at a junction with Highway 118 at the unincorporated community of Whitton in Mississippi County northeast of the small town of Tyronza. AR 308 runs south to the small town of Birdsong before meeting AR 77 at Dimple. The two routes run north together in a concurrency to Denwood. AR 308 turns east, running as a section line road to Interstate 55 (I-55), where it turns south similar to a frontage road along the southbound lanes before crossing over I-55 (no access) to a junction with US 61 in Frenchman's Bayou, where it terminates.

== History ==
The segment between Marked Tree and Highway 135 was adopted as a state highway by the Arkansas State Highway Commission on April 24, 1963. It was rerouted in Marked Tree on October 27, 1965, the former segment remains as a city street named "Old 308 Highway".

The highway between Highway 118 and Birdsong was designated a state highway on April 25, 1973, with an extension to Frenchman's Bayou on February 27, 1974.

== Major intersections ==
Mile markers reset at concurrencies.

County	Location	mi	km	Destinations	Notes
Poinsett	Marked Tree	0.000	0.000	AR 149 (10th Street / Frisco Street)	Eastern terminus, former US 63B
Poinsett	Marked Tree	0.89	1.43	AR 308S east (Airport Road) – Marked Tree Municipal Airport	Hwy. 308S western terminus
Poinsett	Marked Tree	1.42	2.29	AR 308B west (Elm Street) – Marked Tree Business District	Hwy. 308B eastern terminus
Poinsett	Spear Lake	6.216	10.004	AR 135 – Lepanto	Eastern terminus
Gap in route
Mississippi	Whitton	0.000	0.000	AR 118 – Marked Tree	Western terminus
Mississippi		5.312– 0.000	8.549– 0.000	AR 77	
Mississippi	Frenchman's Bayou	5.628	9.057	US 61 / Great River Road – Turrell, Wilson	Eastern terminus
1.000 mi = 1.609 km; 1.000 km = 0.621 mi: Concurrency terminus

== Special routes ==
=== Marked Tree spur ===
Airport Road
- Location: Marked Tree
- Length: 0.127 mi (204 m)
- Existed: June 24, 1970–present

Highway 308 Spur (AR 308S, Ark. 308S, Hwy. 308S, and Airport Road) is a spur route in Marked Tree.

Route description

The highway begins at AR 308 and runs due east to the Marked Tree Municipal Airport.

History

The route was added to the state highway system by the Arkansas State Highway Commission on June 24, 1970.

Major intersections

The entire route is in Marked Tree, Poinsett County.

mi	km	Destinations	Notes
0.000	0.000	AR 308	Western terminus
0.127	0.204	Marked Tree Municipal Airport	Eastern terminus
1.000 mi = 1.609 km; 1.000 km = 0.621 mi

=== Marked Tree business route ===
Highway 308B
- Location: Marked Tree
- Length: 1.311 mi (2.110 km)
- Existed: March 28, 1973–present

Highway 308 Business (AR 308B, Ark. 308B, and Hwy. 308B) is a business route in Marked Tree.

Route description

Highway 308B begins at Highway 308 at the northern city limits of Marked Tree. It runs southwest as Elm Street, paralleling the Left Hand Chute of the Little River through a residential neighborhood. The highway turns onto Broadway Street and terminates at an intersection with AR 14/AR 75 (Nathan Street) and AR 14/AR 140.

History

The business route designation was created by the Arkansas State Highway Commission on March 28, 1973.

Major intersections

The entire route is in Marked Tree, Poinsett County.

mi	km	Destinations	Notes
0.00	0.00	AR 308	Eastern terminus
1.311	2.110	AR 14 / AR 75 south (Nathan Street) / AR 140 east (Broadway Street)	Western terminus, AR 75 northern terminus, AR 140 western terminus
1.000 mi = 1.609 km; 1.000 km = 0.621 mi

== See also ==
- Arkansas Highway 308 (1973–1979) former alignment southwest of Marked Tree
- Arkansas Highway 980 the traditional highway designation for airport roads in Arkansas
- List of state highways in Arkansas
