= Arkansas Highway 297 =

State highway in Arkansas, United States

Highway 297

Route information
- Maintained by ArDOT

Northern section
- Length: 1.66 mi (2.67 km)
- West end: AR 140 in West Ridge
- East end: AR 77

Southern section
- Length: 2.00 mi (3.22 km)
- North end: AR 14 north of Dyess
- South end: CR 139 south of Dyess

Location
- Country: United States
- State: Arkansas
- Counties: Mississippi

Highway system
- Arkansas Highway System; Interstate; US; State; Business; Spurs; Suffixed; Scenic; Heritage
← AR 296	→ AR 298

Arkansas Highway 297 is the name for two different state highways, both in Mississippi County.

== Northern section ==
The northern section of Highway 297 begins in West Ridge at an intersection with Highway 140. It heads east for 1 2/3 miles (2.7 km) and ends at Highway 77. The eastern end is near a private airstrip.

Major intersections

The entire highway is in Mississippi County.

Location	mi	km	Destinations	Notes
West Ridge	0.00	0.00	AR 140 – Lepanto, Osceola	
	1.66	2.67	AR 77	
1.000 mi = 1.609 km; 1.000 km = 0.621 mi

== Southern section ==
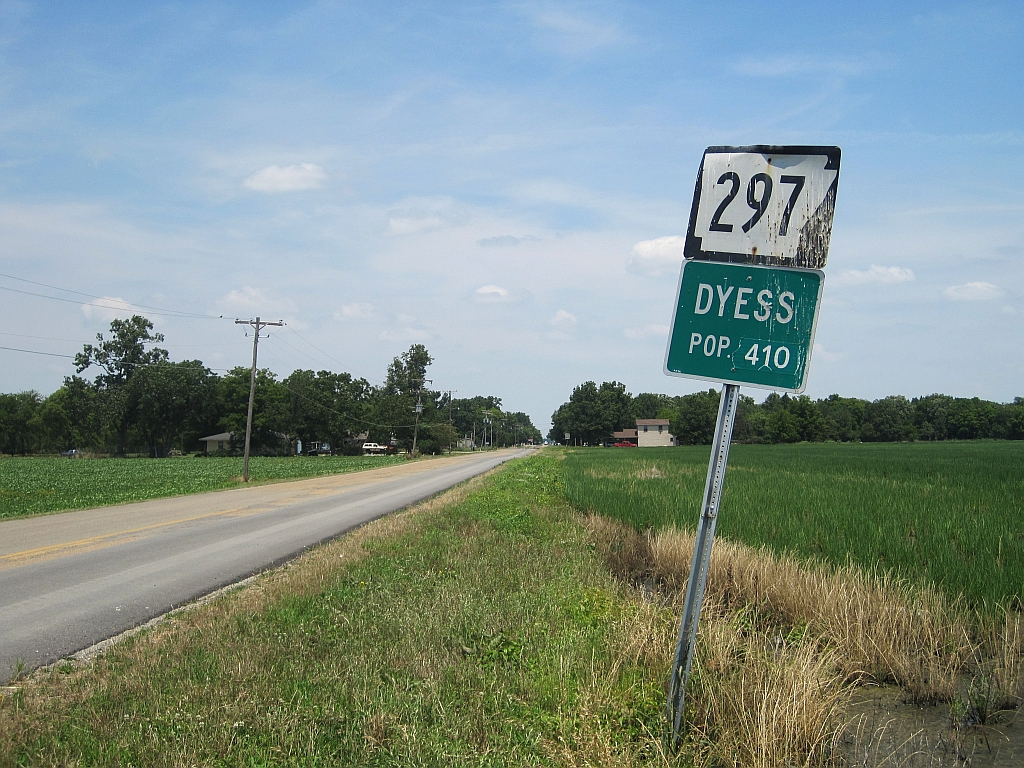
Highway 297 at the Dyess city limits

The southern section of Highway 297 is a spur route which connects Dyess to the highway system. It begins at Highway 14 north of Dyess and heads south. Near its halfway point, the highway crosses the Tyronza River and then passes through the center of Dyess. One half-mile (0.8 km) south of the town center, the designation ends where the pavement ends. It continues south as Mississippi County Road 139.

Major intersections

The entire highway is in Mississippi County.

Location	mi	km	Destinations	Notes
	0.00	0.00	AR 14 – Lepanto, Wilson	
Dyess	2.00	3.22	CR 139	End state maintenance
1.000 mi = 1.609 km; 1.000 km = 0.621 mi
