= Manila School District =

School district in Arkansas

Location
- 419 East Olympia Street; Manila, Arkansas 72442 United States

District information
- Motto: A Great Place To Be
- Grades: PK–12
- Superintendent: Jason Evers
- Accreditations: ADE; AdvancED
- Schools: 3
- NCES District ID: 0500046

Students and staff
- Students: 1,000
- Teachers: 81.26 (on FTE basis)
- Staff: 173.26 (on FTE basis)
- Student–teacher ratio: 12.74
- Athletic conference: 3A Region 3 (2012–14)
- District mascot: Lions
- Colors: black Gold

Other information
- Website: www.manilaschools.org

Manila School District (or Manila Public Schools) is a public school district based in Manila, Arkansas. Manila Public Schools serves more than 1,000 students and employs more than 170 faculty and staff on a full time equivalent basis for its three schools and district office. The school district encompasses 134.66 square miles (348.8 km^{2}) of land in Mississippi County as one of the county's six school districts and serves all or portions of the communities of Manila, Etowah, West Ridge, Leachville, Osceola, and Lepanto.

== History ==
=== Early history ===
In the late 1880s, Manila's first school was located about a half mile north of its present location on Olympia and Davis streets. Students were taught in a one-room schoolhouse by teacher Benjamin Bollinger, with most students only completing a few grades at the little elementary school. Then, on May 21, 1926, Manila graduated its first class of five seniors.

On Friday, May 12, 1944 an AT-9 trainer plane from the nearby Blytheville Army Airfield crashed adjacent to the public school building. Students, faculty, and locals worked to douse the flaming aircraft and save the flight instructor and Army air cadet inside.

=== Current history ===
In 1966 the Brinkley School District of Mississippi County merged into the Manila School District.

The Etowah School District consolidated into the Manila district on July 1, 1986. The board of education of the Etowah district had asked for the merger. Because some people in Etowah wanted to consolidate into the Lepanto School District of Lepanto, a lawsuit was filed to stop the merger, but the Circuit Court of Mississippi County upheld the merger to the Manila district.

Manila School District and each of its three schools are accredited by the Arkansas Department of Education (ADE) and has been accredited by AdvancED (formerly North Central Association) since 1966.

The Manila School District is one of 35 school districts listed as "Achieving" (the highest rating) by the Arkansas Department of Education in support of Adequate Yearly Progress and Augmented Benchmark Examinations.

Manila High School is nationally recognized as a bronze medalist in the Best High Schools Report developed by U.S. News & World Report.

== Schools ==
- Manila High School, serving grades 9 through 12.
- Manila Middle School, serving grades 5 through 8.
- Manila Elementary School, serving prekindergarten through grade 4.

== See also ==
- Mississippi County, Arkansas
- List of school districts in Arkansas
