= Floodway =

Floodway may refer to:

- Flood bypass
- Flood control channel
- Floodway (road), a flood plain crossing for a road
- The community of Floodway, Arkansas
