= Manila High School =

Manila High School may refer to:

- Manila High School (Arkansas), in Manila, Arkansas, served by the Manila School District
- Manila High School (Intramuros), in Manila, Philippines
- Manila High School (Utah), based in Manila, Utah; served by the Daggett School District
