= Arkansas Highway 136 =

State highway in Arkansas, United States

Highway 136

Route information
- Maintained by ArDOT
- Length: 7.87 mi (12.67 km)

Major junctions
- West end: AR 135 south of Rivervale
- East end: AR 77 at Carroll's Corner

Location
- Country: United States
- State: Arkansas
- Counties: Poinsett, Mississippi

Highway system
- Arkansas Highway System; Interstate; US; State; Business; Spurs; Suffixed; Scenic; Heritage
← AR 135	→ AR 137

Highway 136 (AR 136, Ark. 136, Hwy. 136) is an east–west state highway in northeast Arkansas. The route of 7.87 miles (12.67 km) runs from Highway 135 near Rivervale east across Highway 140 to Highway 77 near Etowah.

== Route description ==
Highway 136 begins at Highway 135 east of Rivervale. The route runs east to concur northeasterly with Highway 140. The route continues alone to Etowah, where it passes the Garden Point Cemetery and Edward Samuel Wildy Barn, both listed on the National Register of Historic Places. The highway turns east to terminate at Highway 77 at Carroll's Corner.

== Major intersections ==
Mile markers reset at concurrencies.

County	Location	mi	km	Destinations	Notes
Poinsett		0.00	0.00	AR 135 – Caraway, Black Oak, Lepanto	Western terminus
Mississippi		2.35	3.78	AR 140 west – Lepanto	Begin AR 140 overlap
Mississippi	Etowah	0.00	0.00	AR 140 east – Osceola	End AR 140 overlap
Mississippi	Carroll's Corner	5.52	8.88	AR 77 – Manila	Eastern terminus
1.000 mi = 1.609 km; 1.000 km = 0.621 mi: Concurrency terminus

== See also ==
- List of state highways in Arkansas
