= Arkansas Highway 198 =

State highway in Arkansas, United States

Highway 198
- AR 198 highlighted in red

Route information
- Maintained by ArDOT

Section 1
- Length: 2.45 mi (3.94 km)
- West end: AR 69 / AR 214 in Trumann
- East end: AR 463 in Trumann

Section 2
- Length: 2.70 mi (4.35 km)
- West end: AR 140
- East end: AR 77

Section 3
- Length: 3.38 mi (5.44 km)
- West end: US 61 near Grider
- East end: CR 661 in Sans Souci Landing

Location
- Country: United States
- State: Arkansas
- Counties: Poinsett, Mississippi

Highway system
- Arkansas Highway System; Interstate; US; State; Business; Spurs; Suffixed; Scenic; Heritage
← AR 197	→ AR 199

Highway 198 (AR 198, Ark. 198, and Hwy. 198) is a designation for three state highways in the Upper Arkansas Delta, United States. One route of 2.45 miles (3.94 km) in Trumann runs from Highway 69 east to Highway 463. A second route of 2.70 miles (4.35 km) connects Highway 140 and Highway 77. A third route of 3.38 miles (5.44 km) runs from US Highway 61 (US 61) near Grider east to the Sans Souci Landing on the Mississippi River. All routes are maintained by the Arkansas Department of Transportation.

== Route description ==
=== Trumann ===
Highway 198 begins at Highway 69 and Highway 214 in Trumann. This intersection is adjacent to exit 29 on Interstate 555 (I-555)/US 63, with Highway 214 continuing north from the intersection as a frontage road of the expressway. Highway 198 runs south as a frontage road briefly before turning due east through toward a residential section of Trumann. The highway intersects Highway 463, where it terminates.

=== Poinsett/Mississippi County ===
Highway 198 begins at Highway 140 northeast of Lepanto in eastern Poinsett County. The highway runs due east as a section line road before entering Mississippi County. In Mississippi County, the route curves around the Left Hand Chute of Little River and has an intersection with Highway 77 north of Bondsville, where it terminates.

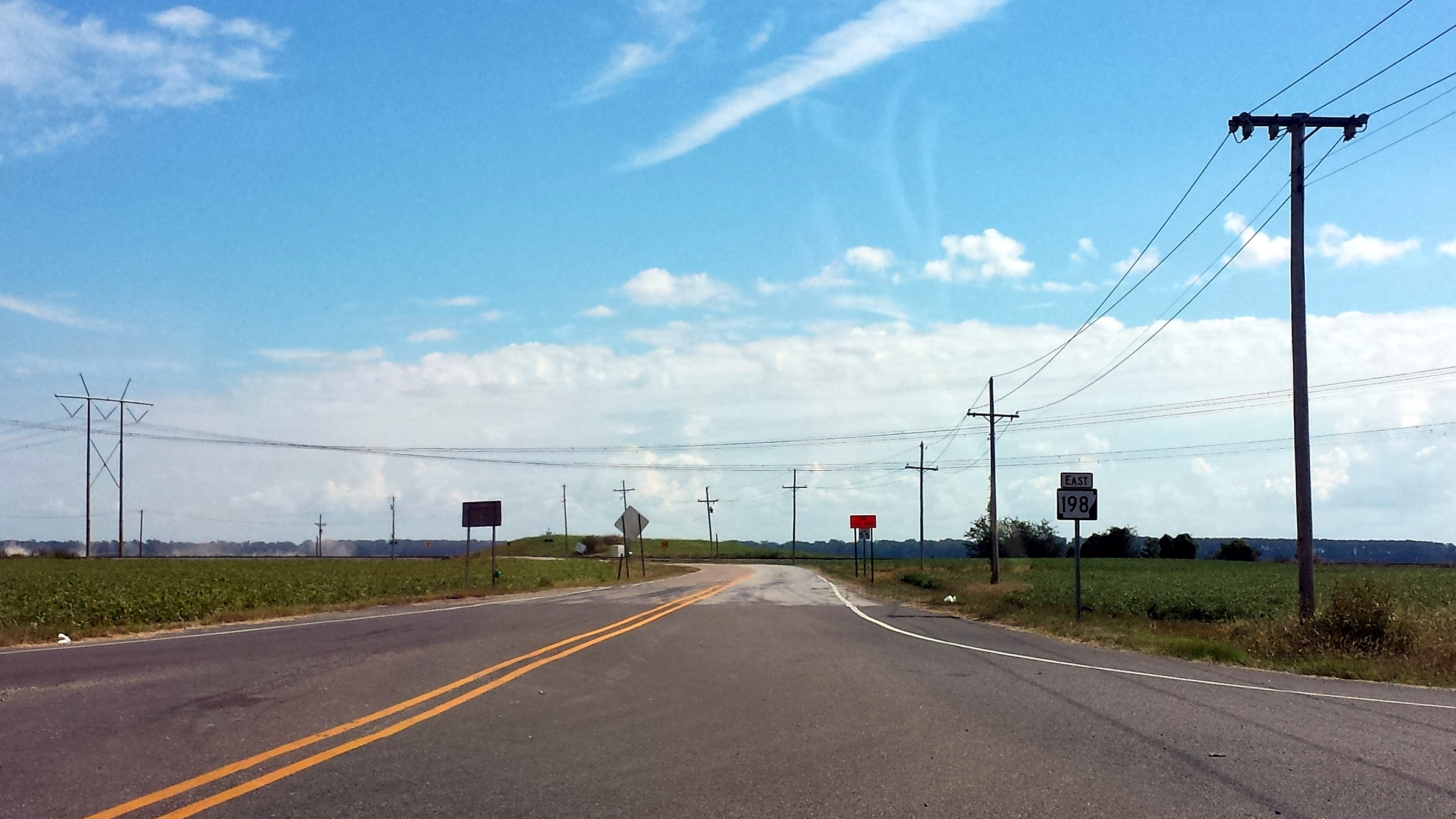
First Highway 198 reassurance marker east of Highway 61

=== Sans Souci ===
Highway 198 begins at US 61 in eastern Mississippi County south of Osceola. The route runs northeast through a heavy industrial area with several industrial facilities, including Big River Steel, Bunge Limited, Plum Point Energy, and Viskase. The route continues east to Sans Souci Landing on the Mississippi River, where it intersects CR 668 and terminates.

== Major intersections ==
County	Location	mi	km	Destinations	Notes
Poinsett	Trumann	0.00	0.00	AR 69 to I-555 east / US 63 / AR 214	Western terminus, AR 214 western terminus
Poinsett	Trumann	2.45	3.94	AR 463 – Payneway, Jonesboro	Eastern terminus
Poinsett	Gap in route				
Poinsett		0.00	0.00	AR 140 – Osceola, Lepanto	Western terminus
Mississippi		2.70	4.35	AR 77 – Turrell, Etowah	Eastern terminus
Mississippi	Gap in route				
Mississippi		0.00	0.00	US 61 – Osceola, Wilson	Western terminus
Mississippi	Sans Souci	3.38	5.44	CR 661	Eastern terminus
1.000 mi = 1.609 km; 1.000 km = 0.621 mi

== See also ==
- List of state highways in Arkansas
