= Edward Samuel Wildy Barn =

- Wildy, Edward Samuel, Barn
- U.S. National Register of Historic Places
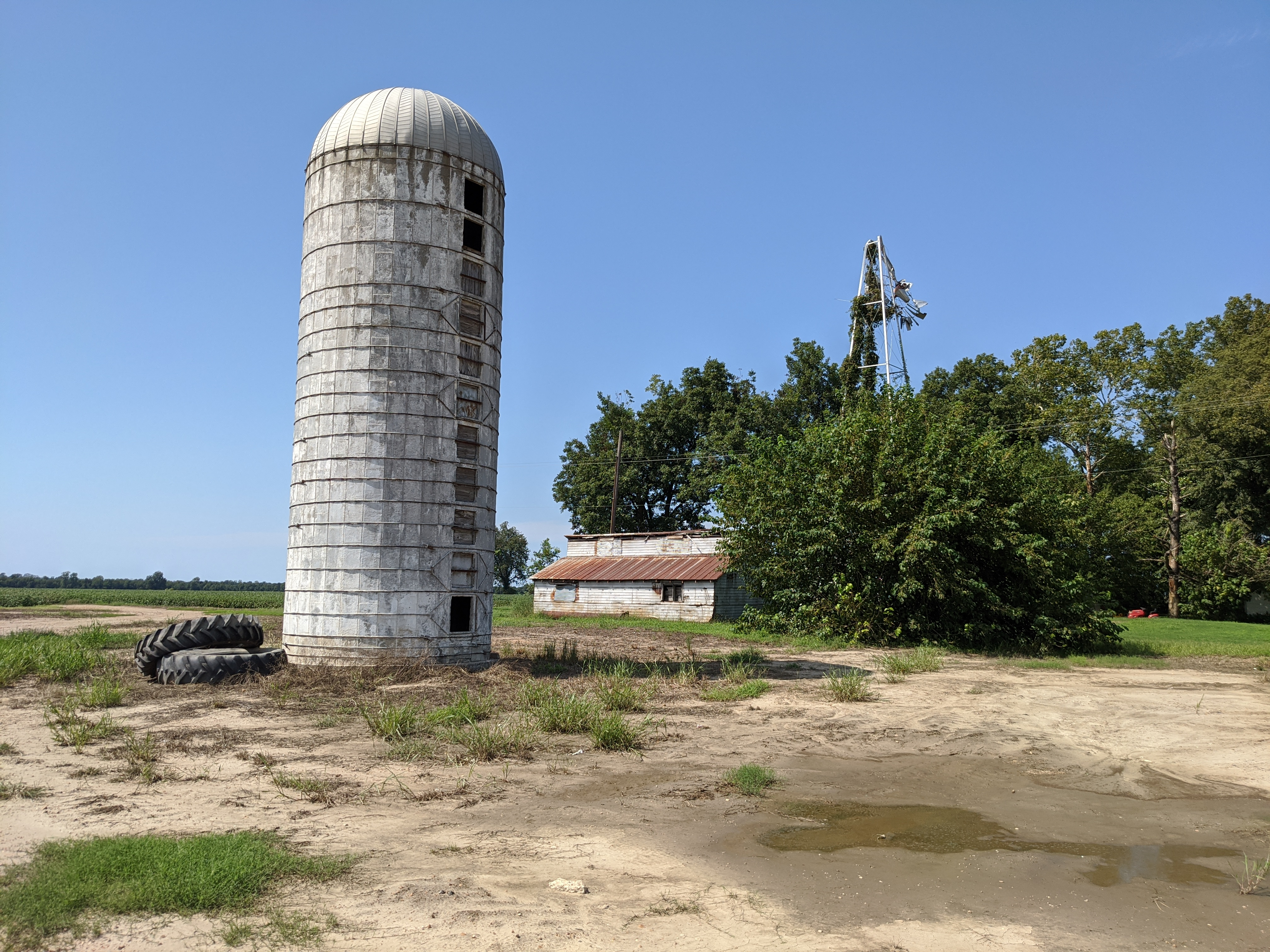

- Location within Arkansas Location within the United States
- Location: 1198 S AR 136; Etowah, Arkansas
- Coordinates: 35°43′7″N 90°14′33″W
- Area: less than one acre
- Built: 1915
- Architectural style: Gambrel Roof Barn
- NRHP reference No.: 03001382
- Added to NRHP: January 15, 2004

The Edward Samuel Wildy Barn is a historic barn at 1198 South Arkansas Highway 136 in rural Etowah, Arkansas. Built in 1915, it is a well-preserved example of a gambrel-roofed barn in Etowah, representative of agricultural practices of the early 20th century in Mississippi County. It is a rectangular structure, with a central component that is gambrel-roofed, and shed-roofed wings on the sides. The complex it stands in, built in 1915 by Edward Samuel Wildy, also includes from that period a windmill, silo, and concrete pads and troughs.

The barn was listed on the National Register of Historic Places in 2004.

== See also ==
- National Register of Historic Places listings in Mississippi County, Arkansas
