= George Washington Carver High School (Marked Tree, Arkansas) =

George Washington Carver School

Location
- Marked Tree, Arkansas; U.S.
- Coordinates: 35.53245°N 90.41360°W

Information
- Former name: George Washington Carver Agricultural School
- Type: Public
- Nickname: Trailblazers

George Washington Carver School was a public secondary school in Marked Tree, Arkansas. It served as the elementary and high school for black students until 1969. The public schools in Marked Tree were integrated in August 1965.

== History ==
In 1938, a school was built for the black children of Marked Tree, consisting of six classrooms and an auditorium. It was the only educational opportunity for black students in Poinsett County. Sometime in the 30s or 50s the teacher of Carver was murdered and burned for teaching black children how to read. In 1952, it was named George Washington Carver High School. In 1969 the school was closed and the 100 black students attended the formerly all-white schools. As of 2015, the only building that remained was the gym, which was in an advanced state of disrepair. Black community leaders advocated restoring the gym as a community center.

== Notable people ==
- Chris Mercer, civil rights activist, taught at the school.
- Fannie Lewis, Cleveland, Ohio's longest serving councilwoman attended the school.
