= Sans Souci, Arkansas =

- Unincorporated community
- Location within Arkansas Location within the United States
- Coordinates: 35°39′11″N 89°56′58″W
- Country: United States
- State: Arkansas
- County: Mississippi
- Elevation: 239 ft (73 m)
- Time zone: UTC-6 (Central (CST))
  - Summer (DST): UTC-5 (CDT)
- Area code: 870
- GNIS feature ID: 58587

Sans Souci is an unincorporated community in Mississippi County, Arkansas, United States. Sans Souci is located on Arkansas Highway 198, 3.75 miles (6.04 km) south-southeast of Osceola.
