= Denwood, Arkansas =

- Unincorporated community
- Location within Arkansas Location within the United States
- Coordinates: 35°29′17″N 90°15′03″W
- Country: United States
- State: Arkansas
- County: Mississippi
- Elevation: 226 ft (69 m)
- Time zone: UTC-6 (Central (CST))
  - Summer (DST): UTC-5 (CDT)
- Area code: 870
- GNIS feature ID: 76783

Denwood is an unincorporated community in Mississippi County, Arkansas, United States. Denwood is located on Arkansas Highway 77, 6 miles (9.7 km) west-southwest of Joiner.
