= Marion Colored High School =

- U.S. National Register of Historic Places
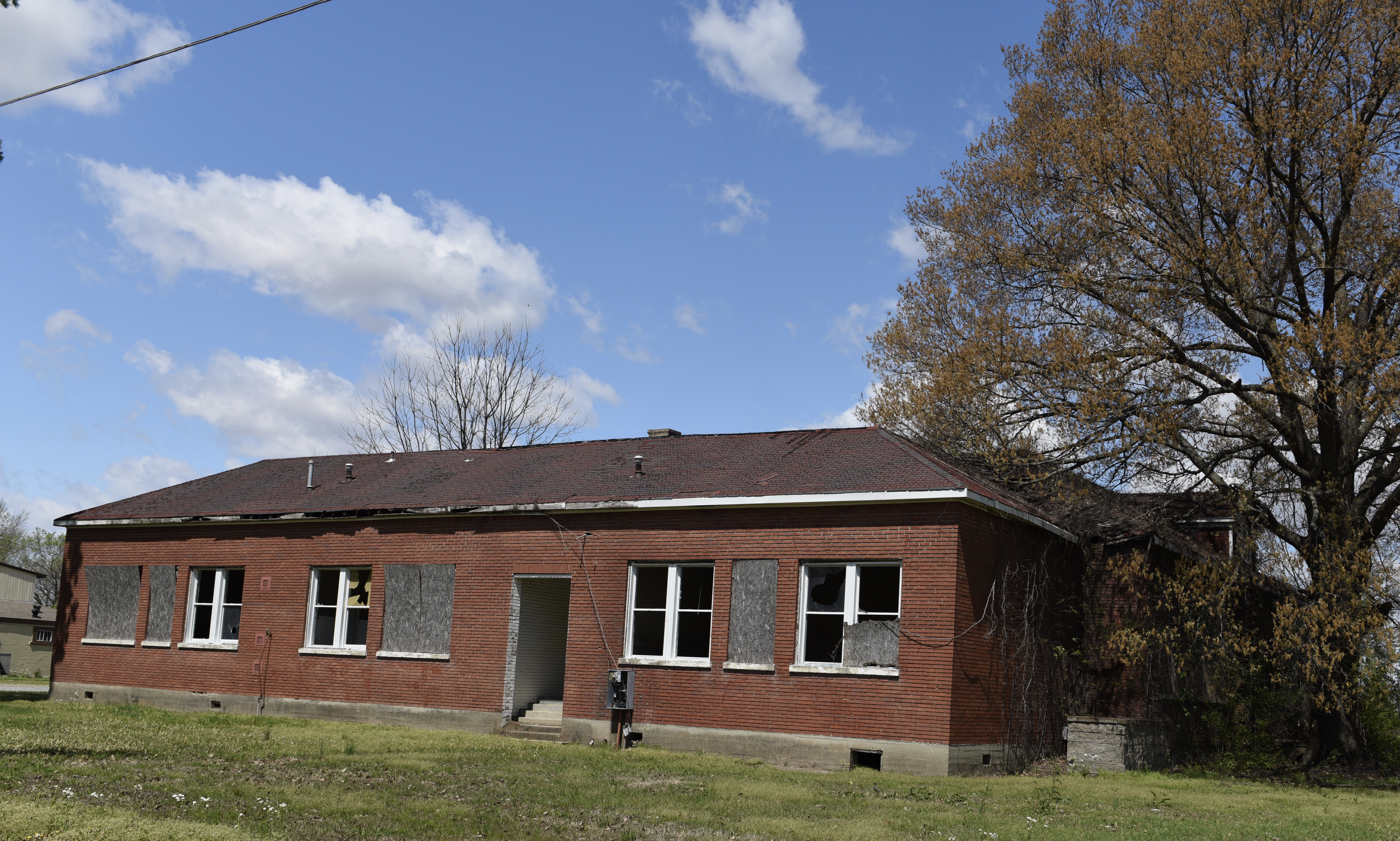

- Location within Arkansas Location within the United States
- Location: W of AR 77; Sunset, Crittenden County, Arkansas, U.S.
- Coordinates: 35°13′17″N 90°12′5″W
- Area: less than one acre
- Built: 1937
- MPS: Ethnic and Racial Minority Settlement of the Arkansas Delta MPS
- NRHP reference No.: 95000349
- Added to NRHP: March 23, 1995

The Marion Colored High School, also known as the Phelix School, is a former segregated public school, and a historic school building located at the northwest corner of Arkansas Highway 77 and Gannt Street in Sunset, Arkansas, United States.

The building was listed on the National Register of Historic Places since 1995.

== History ==
It is a single-story brick structure, roughly in an H shape, with hipped roofs on the wings. The oldest portion of the building, a U-shaped section, was built in 1924 with funding from the Rosenwald Fund, and was extended to its present shape sometime before 1940. The original construction is of load-bearing brick, while the added wings are frame construction finished in a matching brick veneer.

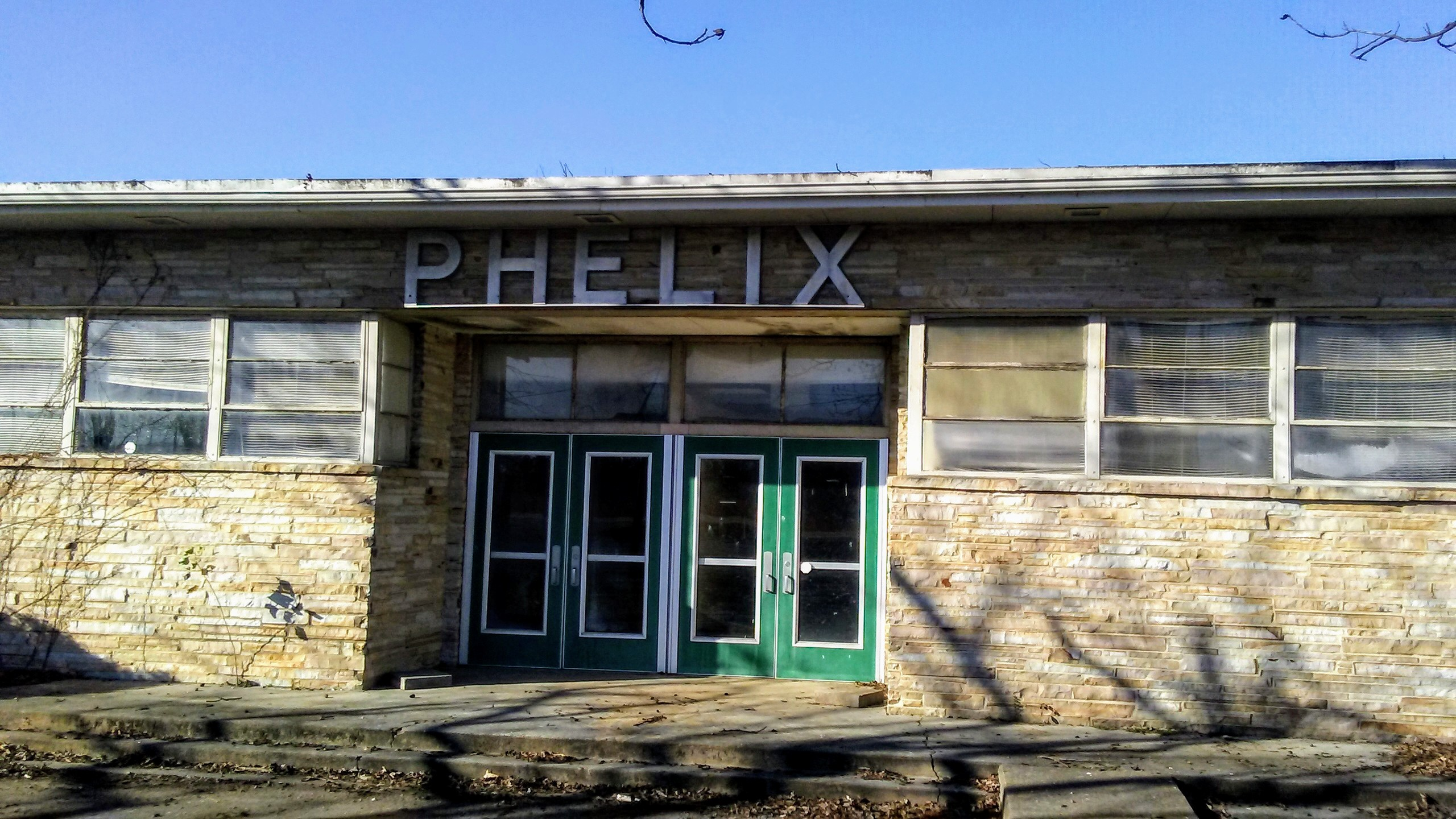
Phelix School, formerly Marion Colored High School

It was the first school built for African-American students in the area, originally serving grades 1st through 8th. In its early history students would come from other states to attend this school, such as Tennessee, Mississippi, and Missouri. In 1937 the school acquired high school status, and served students from four states in the region, prompting its enlargement.

The school was renamed the James Sebastian Phelix School (or J. S. Phelix School) after local mason and undertaker James Sebastian Phelix's death. In 1955 it was remodeled for use exclusively as a high school. It is now closed, and only used for special events.

== See also ==
- National Register of Historic Places listings in Crittenden County, Arkansas
