= Marked Tree High School =

Location
- 406 Saint Francis Street; Marked Tree, Arkansas; United States
- Coordinates: 35°31′38″N 90°25′13″W

Information
- Type: Public secondary
- Established: 1914 (112 years ago)
- School district: Marked Tree School District
- NCES District ID: 0509420
- CEEB code: 041570
- NCES School ID: 050942000687
- Staff: 21.82 (FTE)
- Grades: 9 to 12
- Student to teacher ratio: 10.08
- Colors: Blue and gold
- Athletics conference: 2A 3 (2012-14)
- Mascot: Indian
- Website: www.markedtreeschools.com

Marked Tree High School is a comprehensive public high school for students in grades 7 through 12 in Marked Tree, Arkansas, United States. Marked Tree is one of five public high schools in Poinsett County and is the only high school in the Marked Tree School District. The school is accredited by AdvancED since 1965. It was first established in 1914.

== Academics ==
The assumed course of study follows the Smart Core curriculum developed by the Arkansas Department of Education (ADE), which requires students to complete at least 22 units to graduate. Students complete regular (core and career focus) courses and exams and may select Advanced Placement coursework and exams that provide an opportunity for college credit. The school is accredited by the ADE and has been accredited by AdvancED (formerly North Central Association) since 1952.

== Extracurricular activities ==
The Marked Tree High School mascot and athletic emblem is the Indians with blue and gold serving as its school colors.

=== Athletics ===
For 2012-14, the Marked Tree Indians compete in the 2A Region 3 (Football) Conference under the administration of the Arkansas Activities Association. The Indians participate in a variety of Interscholastic activities including football, golf (boys/girls), basketball (boys/girls), baseball, softball, and track (boys/girls).

Golf

- 2011: 2A State championship

Men's Basketball

- 1988: 2A State championship
- 1989: 2A State runner-ups
- 2001: 2A State championship
- 2017: 2A State runner-ups
- 2018: 1A state runner-ups
- 2024: 1A state championship

=== Band ===
The marked tree high school band plays at football games, seasonal concerts, and parades.
