= Arkansas Highway 140 =

Highway in Arkansas

Highway 140

Route information
- Maintained by ArDOT
- Length: 34.63 mi (55.73 km)
- Existed: November 25, 1958–present

Western section
- Length: 32.70 mi (52.63 km)
- West end: AR 14 / AR 75 / AR 149 in Marked Tree
- East end: US 61 in Osceola

Eastern section
- Length: 1.93 mi (3.11 km)
- South end: Pearl Street / Quinn Avenue in Osceola
- North end: US 61 in Osceola

Location
- Country: United States
- State: Arkansas
- Counties: Poinsett, Mississippi

Highway system
- Arkansas Highway System; Interstate; US; State; Business; Spurs; Suffixed; Scenic; Heritage
← AR 139	→ AR 141
← I-40	AR 40	→ AR 41

Highway 140 is a designation for two east–west state highways in the Upper Arkansas Delta. One route of about 32.70 miles (52.63 km) begins at Highway 14 in Marked Tree and runs east to US 61 in Osceola. A second segment of 1.93 miles (3.11 km) in east Osceola runs from US 61 to Pearl Street and Quinn Avenue. Both routes are maintained by the Arkansas State Highway and Transportation Department (AHTD).

== Route description ==
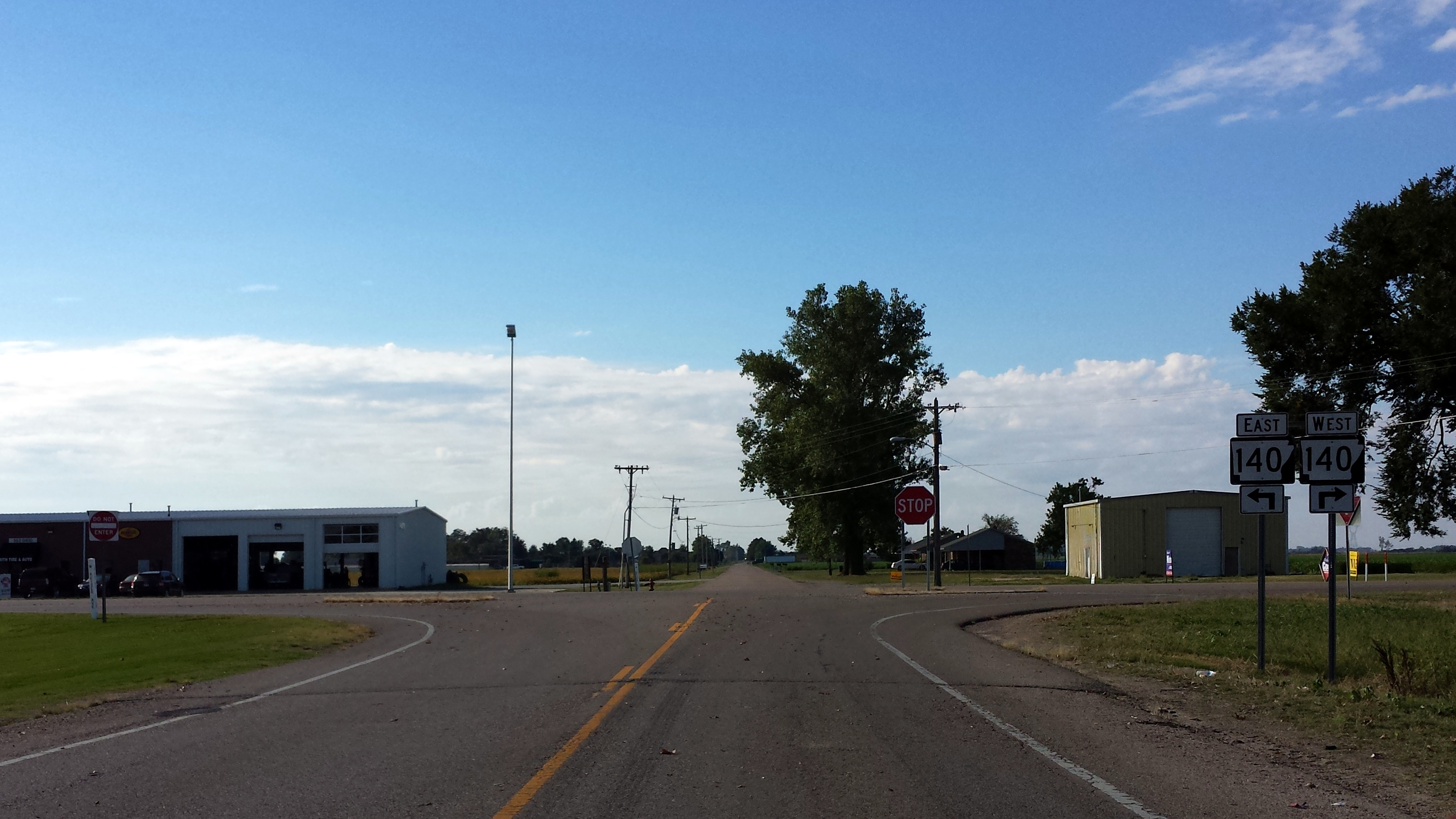
Looking south at AR 40 in western Osceola, September 2014

=== Marked Tree to Osceola ===
AR 140 begins at US 63B in Marked Tree. It runs north with AR 14 until Lepanto, where the route crosses AR 135. AR 140 then heads northeast, briefly concurring with AR 136 and AR 181 individually before crossing under Interstate 55.

The route continues east to Osceola, meeting US 61.

=== Osceola ===
A separate section begins in Osceola and runs north to US 61 near the city limits.

== History ==
State Road 40
- Location: Poinsett and Mississippi counties
- Existed: April 1, 1926–November 25, 1958

Present-day Highway 140 was created on April 1, 1926 as State Road 40, one of the original Arkansas state highways. On November 25, 1958, the route was renumbered to Highway 140 after the American Association of State Highway Officials (AASHTO) designated Interstate 40 in Arkansas.

The original Highway 140 was created between March 1930 and June 1931 from US 65 in Dumas westward to Garrett Bridge. This route became part of AR 54 in 1937.

== Major intersections ==
County	Location	mi	km	Destinations	Notes
Poinsett	Marked Tree	0.00	0.00	AR 149 south / AR 75 south	Western terminus, northern terminus of AR 75
Poinsett	Marked Tree	0.13	0.21	AR 308B east (Broadway Street)	
Poinsett	Lepanto	9.90	15.93	AR 135 – Caraway, Black Oak, Lepanto Business District, Lepanto Museum	
Poinsett	Lepanto	10.15	16.33	AR 14 east – Wilson	
Poinsett		13.17	21.20	AR 198 east	
Mississippi		14.23	22.90	AR 136 west to AR 135	West end of AR 136 overlap
Mississippi	West Ridge	16.34	26.30	AR 297 north	
Mississippi	Etowah	17.46	28.10	AR 136 east – Etowah	East end of AR 136 overlap
Mississippi	Etowah	18.62	29.97	AR 77 south – Bondsville	West end of AR 77 overlap
Mississippi	Athelstan	21.63	34.81	AR 77 north – Manila	East end of AR 77 overlap
Mississippi		26.05	41.92	AR 181 south – Keiser	West end of AR 181 overlap
Mississippi		27.51	44.27	AR 181 north to AR 18	East end of AR 181 overlap
Mississippi	Osceola	28.71	46.20	I-55 / US 78 – Blytheville, Memphis	I-55 exit 48
Mississippi	Osceola	30.60	49.25	AR 119Y (Country Club Road) – Victoria	
Mississippi	Osceola	32.70	52.63	US 61 / Great River Road – Osceola River Port	Eastern terminus
Mississippi	Osceola	32.70	52.63	Gap in route	
Mississippi	Osceola	32.70	52.63	North Pearl Street / Quinn Avenue	Southern terminus
Mississippi	Osceola	34.63	55.73	US 61 / Great River Road	Northern terminus
1.000 mi = 1.609 km; 1.000 km = 0.621 mi: Concurrency terminus

== See also ==
- List of state highways in Arkansas
