= Nick Bacon =

United States Army Medal of Honor recipient

Nicky Daniel Bacon
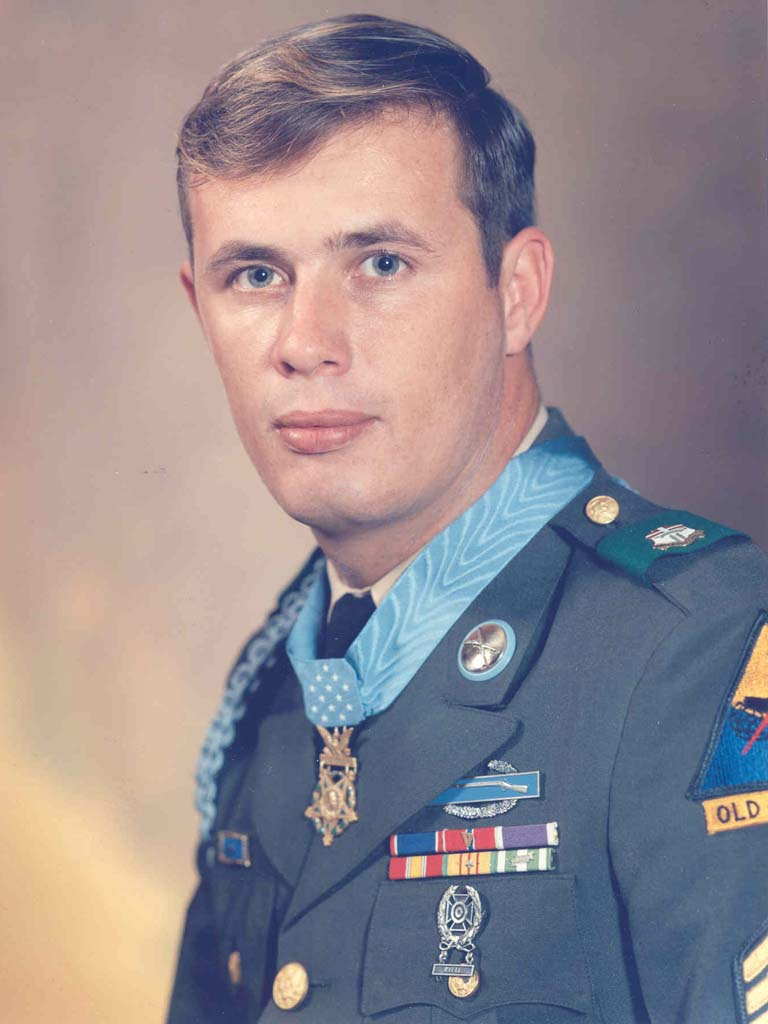
- Nick Bacon just after receiving the Medal of Honor from President Richard Nixon in 1969.
- Born: November 25, 1945; Caraway, Arkansas, U.S.
- Died: July 17, 2010 (aged 64); Rose Bud, Arkansas, U.S.
- Burial place: Arkansas State Veterans Cemetery, North Little Rock, Arkansas
- Military career
- Allegiance: United States of America
- Branch: Arizona National Guard; United States Army
- Service years: 1963 – 1964 (National Guard); 1964 – 1984 (Army)
- Rank: First Sergeant
- Units: 1st and 3rd Platoon, Company B, 4th Battalion, 21st Infantry Regiment, 11th Infantry Brigade, Americal Division
- Conflicts: Vietnam War
- Awards: Medal of Honor; Distinguished Service Cross; Legion of Merit; Bronze Star Medal (2); Purple Heart (2); Army Commendation Medal (4)

Nicky Daniel Bacon (November 25, 1945 – July 17, 2010) was a United States Army first sergeant from the Americal Division who served during the Vietnam War. For his actions in combat in Tam Ky, Vietnam, Bacon was awarded America's highest military decoration, the Medal of Honor.

== Early life ==
Bacon was born in Caraway, Arkansas, on November 25, 1945, one of nine children. His parents, Johno and Beta Imogene "Jean" (Meadows) Bacon, were sharecroppers on a cotton farm. His siblings were sisters Jenny, Brenda, Judy, Hope, and Wanda and brothers Doyle, Johno Jr., and Andy. In 1951, a poor farming economy prompted the family to move to Glendale, Arizona, where Johno Bacon's parents lived. Nicky Bacon grew up driving tractors and picking cotton on the ranch where his father worked. He dropped out of Peoria High School to work full-time to support the family when his father contracted polio, although he later earned a GED. "I hated picking cotton and that other stuff," he later said. "I've done my share of it. And I'll guarantee you one thing: I've never, ever went back to it once I was old enough to hold a man's job."

== Military service ==
In 1963, at age 17, Bacon forged his mother's signature to enlist in the Arizona National Guard. The next year, he joined the US Army, and after basic training at Fort Ord in California, he was stationed in Worms, Germany. Of his military service Bacon later said, "I was never prouder, I was never in better shape, I was never more sure that I stood for something in my life than I was when I wore the uniform." He served his first tour of Vietnam in 1966 during which he was wounded three times. On his first mission in Vietnam, the helicopter he was riding in collided with another, killing everyone except Bacon and one other soldier.

Bacon volunteered to serve a second combat tour in Vietnam from 1968 to 1969. He reached the rank of staff sergeant while serving with Company B, 4th Battalion, 21st Infantry Regiment, 11th Infantry Brigade of the Americal Division. On August 26, 1968, while leading a squad in Bravo Company's 1st Platoon, in an operation west of Tam Kỳ, Bacon and his unit came under fire from enemy positions. While Bacon destroyed these positions with hand grenades, his platoon leader was wounded in open ground. Assuming command, Bacon led the platoon in destroying still more enemy emplacements.

When the 3rd Platoon lost its leader, Bacon took command of that platoon as well and led both platoons against the remaining enemy positions. During the evacuation of the wounded, Bacon climbed the side of a nearby tank to gain a vantage point and direct fire into enemy positions, despite his exposure to enemy fire. "I got my boot heel shot off, I got holes in my canteens, I got my rifle grip shot up," he recalled in "Beyond Glory," a 2003 book by Larry Smith of history interviews with Medal of Honor recipients. "I got shrapnel holes in my camouflage covers, and bullets in my pot. A bullet creased the edge of it, tore the lining off." He was personally credited with killing at least 4 enemy soldiers and destroying an antitank gun. After the battle, Nicky discovered that his childhood friend John Ahrenberg, was a crew member of that tank.

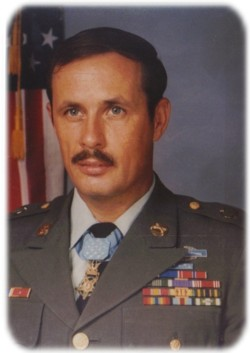
1SG Nick Bacon shortly before retirement from the US Army

For his actions in this battle, Bacon received the Medal of Honor. The medal was formally presented to him by President Richard Nixon during a 1969 White House ceremony. For his service in Vietnam and throughout his career, he also received the Distinguished Service Cross, the Legion of Merit, two Bronze Stars, two Purple Heart medals (one awarded later in 2008 due to an administrative oversight) and numerous other awards and decorations. "Did I enjoy combat? Yeah. I enjoyed the game," Bacon said in the "Beyond Glory" interview. "I was good at it."

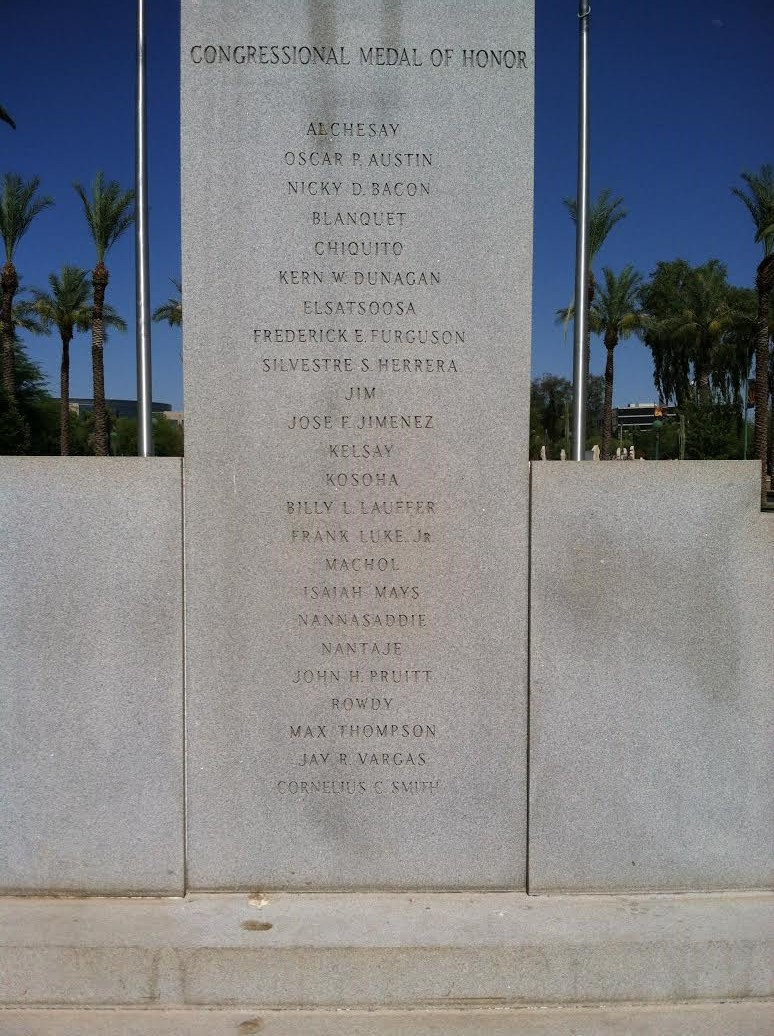
Nick Bacon's name listed on the Arizona's War Heroes Memorial

Bacon requested a third tour of duty in Vietnam but was denied. He instead served as a recruiter at Fort Hood, Texas, was stationed in Giessen, Germany, and worked in the training command at Fort McClellan, Alabama, before retiring in June 1984 as a first sergeant. He chose to retire from the military when he received orders to go to Korea. He was newly married to his second wife and had a young son. "When I was young, it was fun traveling and having new adventures," he told the Arkansas Democrat-Gazette in 1997. "But I didn't want to start over again with raising a family back home and being halfway around the world myself. As you get older, you would like to think of yourself as tough and that you could still strap it all on and head for the boonies, but you can't do that . . . Wars are fought by young men."

== Later years and legacy ==
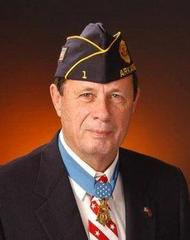
Nick Bacon in 2005 while Director of the Arkansas Department of Veterans Affairs

Bacon had six children, daughters Kristy and Kim and sons William, James, Wyatt, and Britt. Bacon was also a Christian, declaring in a published statement on the September 11, 2001 terrorist attacks: "I am a Christian, and as spiritual as the next person" and stating his belief that the "greatest weapon we have in America is our faith in God and his Grace and Power."

After his military retirement, Bacon returned with his wife, Tamera Ann, to Arizona and worked for the Department of Veterans Affairs at their Phoenix regional office. While there, he was the co-originator with Larry Mullins of the Med-Vet Healthcare Program in Phoenix and participated in John McCain's 1986 political campaign in which McCain was first elected to the US Senate. Bacon later served as town manager for the Phoenix suburb of Surprise from 1987 to 1990, during which time he oversaw the expansion of the town's territory and development by annexing nearly 75 square miles of land. Bacon was praised for his efforts by Surprise City Councilman Roy Villanueva, who initially opposed Bacon's expansion efforts but later commented that Bacon "was a good person who involved himself with the community and tried to help Surprise as much as possible." Likewise, former Surprise City Clerk Sherry Aguilar commented on Bacon's drive. "It seemed like he had so much energy and was really wanting to take (Surprise) to the next level," she said. "It seemed like he was so enthusiastic."

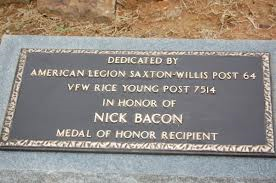
Dedication plaque at a flag pole in Heber Springs, AR.

In 1990, Bacon moved back to Arkansas and lived in the town of Rose Bud. He was appointed director of the Arkansas Department of Veterans Affairs by Governor Jim Guy Tucker in April 1993 and served until his final retirement in February 2005. During his tenure, he helped establish the Arkansas State Veterans Cemetery and the Arkansas Veterans Coalition. He "used the recognition he received throughout his life to draw attention to veterans' issues" and "considered the cemetery one of his greatest accomplishments" according to his brother John.

Bacon was part of the official United States delegation to normalize relations with Vietnam in 1995 and traveled to Israel in the late 1990s on behalf of Jewish veterans to urge the Israeli government not to cede the Golan Heights to Syria. He later served as president of the Congressional Medal of Honor Society and Chair Emeritus of the American Board for Certification in Homeland Security. Bacon was also inducted into the Military Police Hall of Fame at Fort Leonard Wood, Missouri. In 2006, Bacon was honored by the MacArthur Museum of Arkansas Military History with the Arsenal Award in recognition of his service to the nation and the State of Arkansas. Bacon was also inducted into the Arkansas Military Veterans Hall of Fame and the Arizona Veterans Hall of Fame. Bacon's other honors included the George Washington Award from the State of Arizona, the FBI Civilian Academy Award, The American Academy of Medical Administrators' Statesman Award, the Minuteman Award, the 82nd Airborne Iron Mike Award, and the Omar Bradley Award of the Congressional Medal of Honor Society. Bacon was an active member of numerous veterans' organizations, including the American Legion, Disabled American Veterans, Veterans of Foreign Wars, and the Military Order of the Purple Heart.

In 2004, Bacon was appointed by House Speaker Dennis Hastert (R-Ill.) to the Veterans' Disability Benefits Commission, an independent, 13-member panel charged with studying the military's system of compensating veterans for injuries to ensure that it was equitable and fair. The commission issued its final report, which made more than 100 recommendations, in 2007. He also served on the President's National Hire Veterans Committee and the Veterans Disability Benefits Commission. Bacon ventured into private business later in life, serving as president and chief executive of DVC Construction, Inc. Bacon, along with Steven Spielberg, was included in the production credits for the video game Medal of Honor: Allied Assault.

Bacon died on the morning of July 17, 2010, after a long battle with cancer. He was the last living Medal of Honor recipient from the state of Arkansas. His widow Tamera remembered him above all as a man of faith. "In life Nick was faced with a lot of battles," she said, "whether fighting in Vietnam, fighting for our veterans, fighting for this small town or fighting cancer. Through all these battles Nick’s strength was his relationship with our Lord, Jesus Christ." His brother John remembered his humility and friendliness. "He was very humble and he accepted the roles," John Bacon said. "I was impressed so many times going to banquets with dignitaries and politicians. It didn't affect him in the least. He was as comfortable with a person on the street as he was with George W. Bush." Likewise, his nephew, Surprise police Lieutenant John Bacon, stated that Bacon "was very humble and unassuming. He was a leader in a very quiet way but he wasn't afraid to speak out when he needed to." Arkansas Governor Mike Beebe referred to Bacon as an "American hero" and stated "He never wanted anything for himself, but always wanted to protect other people in uniform. Arkansas will miss him." Bacon's burial took place with full military honors at the Arkansas State Veterans Cemetery in North Little Rock on July 24.

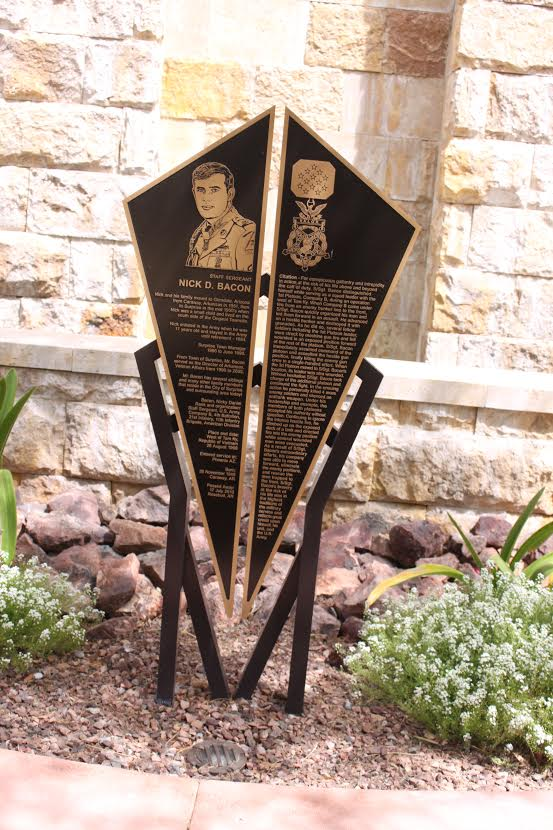
The Nick Bacon memorial

The Veterans of Foreign Wars has since honored him with the establishment of the Nick Bacon Memorial Scholarship for children and grandchildren of disabled veterans and has named VFW Post 285 in Surprise, Arizona in his honor. Likewise, "a Memorial Room at an American Legion Post in Little Rock now honors Nick Bacon." In 2012, the United States House of Representatives passed H.R. 3870X, which was introduced by Congressman Timothy Griffin (R-AR) and acted to "designate the facility of the United States Postal Service located at 6083 Highway 36 West in Rose Bud, Arkansas, as the Nicky "Nick" Daniel Bacon Post Office.'" Heber Springs, Arkansas installed a new flagpole and a memorial marker honoring Bacon in the town ball park in 2012. The City of Surprise, Arizona unveiled a memorial to Bacon in the plaza outside the city hall on November 11, 2014, in a ceremony including nearly fifty members of his family, US Congressman Trent Franks, Arizona Secretary of State of Arizona Ken Bennett, and Arizona House of Representatives members Debbie Lesko and Rick Gray.

== Medal of Honor ==
=== Medal of Honor ===
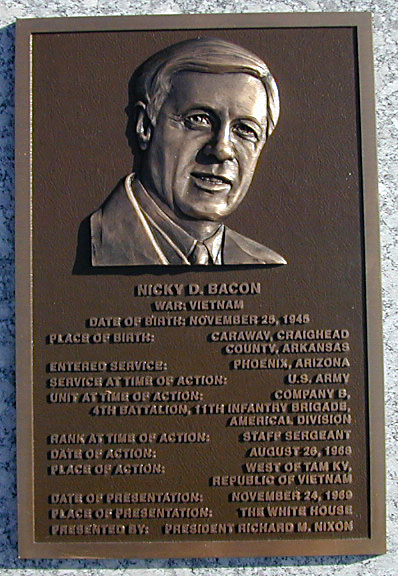
Arkansas Medal of Honor Memorial

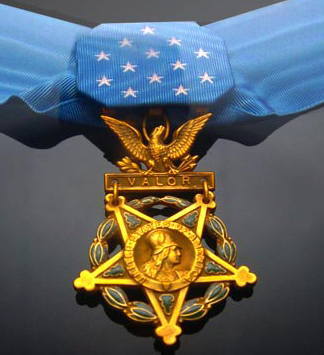

Nicky Daniel Bacon
Rank: Staff Sergeant
Conflict/Era: Vietnam War
Unit/Command: Company B, 4th Battalion, 21st Infantry 11th Infantry Brigade, Americal Division
Military Branch: U.S. Army
Location and Date: West of Tam Ky, Republic of Vietnam, August 26, 1968
Born: November 25, 1945, Caraway, Craighead County, Arkansas, United States

Citation:

For conspicuous gallantry and intrepidity in action at the risk of his life above and beyond the call of duty. S/Sgt. Bacon distinguished himself while serving as a squad leader with the 1st Platoon, Company B, during an operation west of Tam Ky. When Company B came under fire from an enemy bunker line to the front, S/Sgt. Bacon quickly organized his men and led them forward in an assault. He advanced on a hostile bunker and destroyed it with grenades. As he did so, several fellow soldiers including the 1st Platoon leader, were struck by machine gun fire and fell wounded in an exposed position forward of the rest of the platoon. S/Sgt. Bacon immediately assumed command of the platoon and assaulted the hostile gun position, finally killing the enemy gun crew in a single-handed effort. When the 3d Platoon moved to S/Sgt. Bacon's location, its leader was also wounded. Without hesitation S/Sgt. Bacon took charge of the additional platoon and continued the fight. In the ensuing action he personally killed 4 more enemy soldiers and silenced an antitank weapon. Under his leadership and example, the members of both platoons accepted his authority without question. Continuing to ignore the intense hostile fire, he climbed up on the exposed deck of a tank and directed fire into the enemy position while several wounded men were evacuated. As a result of S/Sgt. Bacon's extraordinary efforts, his company was able to move forward, eliminate the enemy positions, and rescue the men trapped to the front. S/Sgt. Bacon's bravery at the risk of his life was in the highest traditions of the military service and reflects great credit upon himself, his unit, and the U.S. Army.

== Awards and Decorations ==
1SG Bacon was awarded the following during his military career:

Badge	Combat Infantryman Badge		
1st row	Medal of Honor		Distinguished Service Cross
2nd row	Legion of Merit	Bronze Star Medal with "V" Device and 1 Oak leaf cluster	Purple Heart
3rd row	Air Medal	Army Commendation Medal	Army Good Conduct Medal with 7 Good Conduct Loops
4th row	National Defense Service Medal	Vietnam Service Medal with 3 Campaign stars	NCO Professional Development Ribbon
5th row	Army Service Ribbon	Overseas Service Ribbon with Numeral 2	Vietnam Campaign Medal
Unit awards	Presidential Unit Citation	Meritorious Unit Commendation	RVN Gallantry Cross Unit Citation with Palm

23rd Infantry Division patch

== See also ==
- List of Medal of Honor recipients for the Vietnam War
