= Arkansas Highway 191 =

State highway in Arkansas, United States

Highway 191

Route information
- Maintained by ArDOT
- Length: 2.27 mi (3.65 km)

Major junctions
- South end: US 70 in West Memphis
- I-40 / I-55 in West Memphis
- North end: AR 77 in West Memphis

Location
- Country: United States
- State: Arkansas
- Counties: Crittenden

Highway system
- Arkansas Highway System; Interstate; US; State; Business; Spurs; Suffixed; Scenic; Heritage
← AR 190	→ AR 192

Arkansas Highway 191 (AR 191, Hwy. 191) is a 2.27-mile (3.65 km) state highway located entirely within West Memphis in the U.S. state of Arkansas. The highway runs from U.S. Highway 70 (US 70) north to AR 77. The highway is maintained by the Arkansas Department of Transportation (ArDOT).

== Route description ==
AR 191 begins at a junction with US 70 in West Memphis. The highway heads north through a mixed residential and business area, crossing the Tenmile Bayou within this area. It crosses another bridge before reaching a junction with exit 278 on Interstate 40 (I-40), I-55, US 61, US 64, and US 79. The route heads through an open field north of this interchange, curving westward within the field to parallel a Union Pacific Railroad line. AR 191 terminates at an intersection with AR 77 (Great River Road) in an industrial area.

== History ==
The route which AR 191 follows first appeared on the 1966 Arkansas state highway map.

== Major intersections ==
The entire route is in West Memphis, Crittenden County.

mi	km	Destinations	Notes
0.0	0.0	US 70 (Broadway Avenue) / 7th Street	
1.3	2.1	I-40 / I-55 / US 61 / US 64 / US 79 – Memphis, Little Rock, Blytheville	Exit 278 (I-40), access via I-40 frontage roads
2.3	3.7	AR 77 / Great River Road to I-40 / AFCO Road – Marion	
1.000 mi = 1.609 km; 1.000 km = 0.621 mi
