= Deleta Williams =

American politician (1935–2024)

Deleta Parmley Williams (August 21, 1935 – December 11, 2024) was an American Democratic politician from Warrensburg, Missouri. She served in the Missouri House of Representatives from 1993 to 2003.

== Life and career ==
Born in Caraway, Arkansas, Williams graduated from Central Missouri State University with a bachelor's degree in business administration. She worked as a real estate broker and as Johnson County collector.

Williams died December 11, 2024, at the age of 89.
