= Marked Tree School District =

School district in Arkansas, United States

Address
- 406 Saint Francis Street Marked Tree, Arkansas, 72365; United States

District information
- Type: Public
- Grades: PreK–12
- Superintendent: Matt Wright
- NCES District ID: 0509420

Students and staff
- Students: 499
- Teachers: 42.99
- Staff: 37.2
- Student–teacher ratio: 11.61

Other information
- Website: www.markedtreeschools.com

Marked Tree School District 28 is a school district based in Marked Tree, Poinsett County, Arkansas, United States. The school district provides early childhood, elementary and secondary education for more than 650 students in prekindergarten through grade 12 and employs more than 100 educators and staff for its three schools and district offices.

The school district encompasses 100.57 square miles (260.5 km^{2}) of land in Poinsett County and supports Marked Tree, Trumann and Tyronza.

== History ==
Before 1901, the only public school for the children of Marked Tree was about one mile out of town in a building called Woodman Hall. In 1901, the first public school within Marked Tree began. A new building was built in 1906, and in 1914, a three-story brick building was built to house the school. In 1914, the high school began; it was remodeled in the summer of 1949. A new elementary school was built in 1937. It later became the middle school but burned down in 1978. A new elementary school was built in 1957.

In September 1938, a George Washington Carver School was started for black children. It had six classrooms. The schools were desegregated in 1965 with the enrollment of 6 African American children in the public school system. The names of the six children were King Solomon Johnson, Carl Lynn Johnson, Cleodis Lee Bradley, Florence Bradley, Chaundra Grant and Deborah Nix

== Schools ==
The school district consists of the following schools:

- Marked Tree Elementary School, serving prekindergarten through grade 6.
- Marked Tree High School, serving grades 7 through 12.

Marked Tree School District is one of several school districts affiliated with the Crowley's Ridge Education Service Cooperative.
