= Athelstan, Arkansas =

Unincorporated community in Arkansas, US

- Unincorporated community
- Location within Arkansas Location within the United States
- Coordinates: 35°41′53″N 90°10′42″W
- Country: United States
- State: Arkansas
- County: Mississippi
- Elevation: 230 ft (70 m)
- Time zone: UTC-6 (Central (CST))
  - Summer (DST): UTC-5 (CDT)
- Area code: 870
- GNIS feature ID: 57285

Athelstan is an unincorporated community in Mississippi County, Arkansas, United States. Athelstan is located at the junction of Arkansas highways 77 and 140, 11.5 miles (18.5 km) west of Osceola.
