= Frenchmans Bayou, Arkansas =

Unincorporated community in Mississippi County, Arkansas

- Unincorporated community
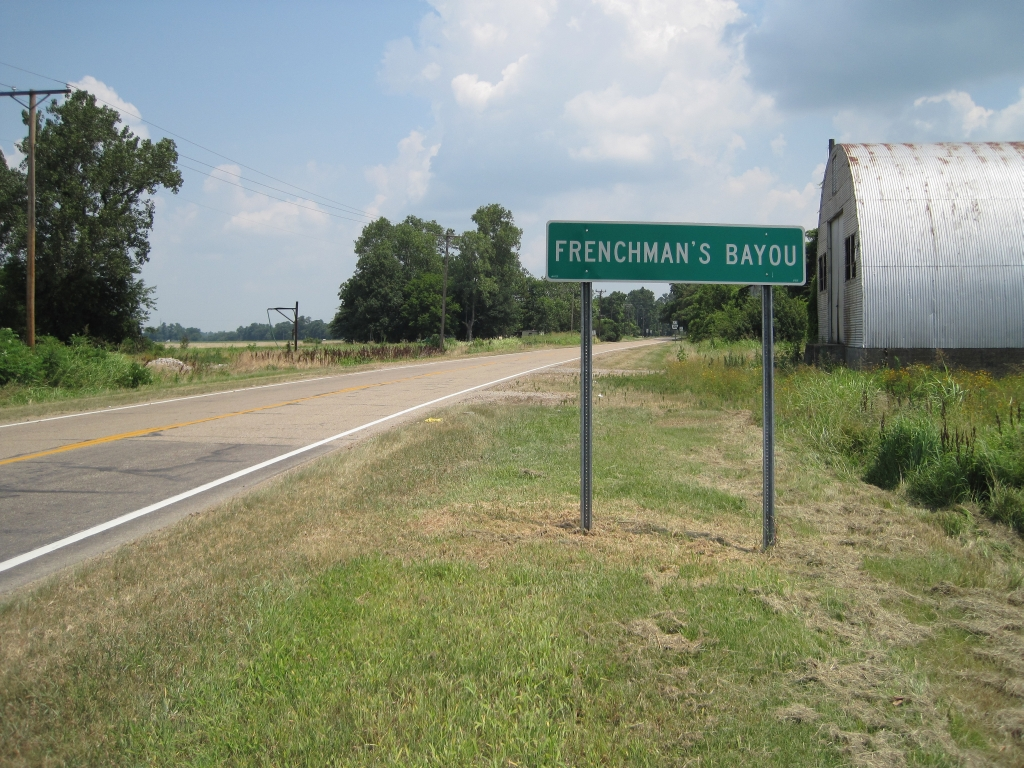

- Location within Arkansas Location within the United States
- Coordinates: 35°27′58″N 90°10′51″W
- Country: United States
- State: Arkansas
- County: Mississippi

Government
- Elevation: 217 ft (66 m)
- Time zone: UTC-6 (Central (CST))
  - Summer (DST): UTC-5 (CDT)
- ZIP code: 72338
- Area code: 870
- GNIS feature ID: 76978

Frenchmans Bayou is an unincorporated community in Mississippi County, Arkansas, United States. Frenchmans Bayou is located at the intersection of U.S. Route 61 and Arkansas Highway 308, 3.5 miles (5.6 km) southwest of Joiner. Frenchmans Bayou has a post office with ZIP code 72338.

== Education ==
Public education for elementary and secondary students is provided by the Rivercrest School District (formerly Southern Mississippi County School District). Students graduate from Rivercrest High School which located near Wilson.
