= Marked Tree, Arkansas =

- City
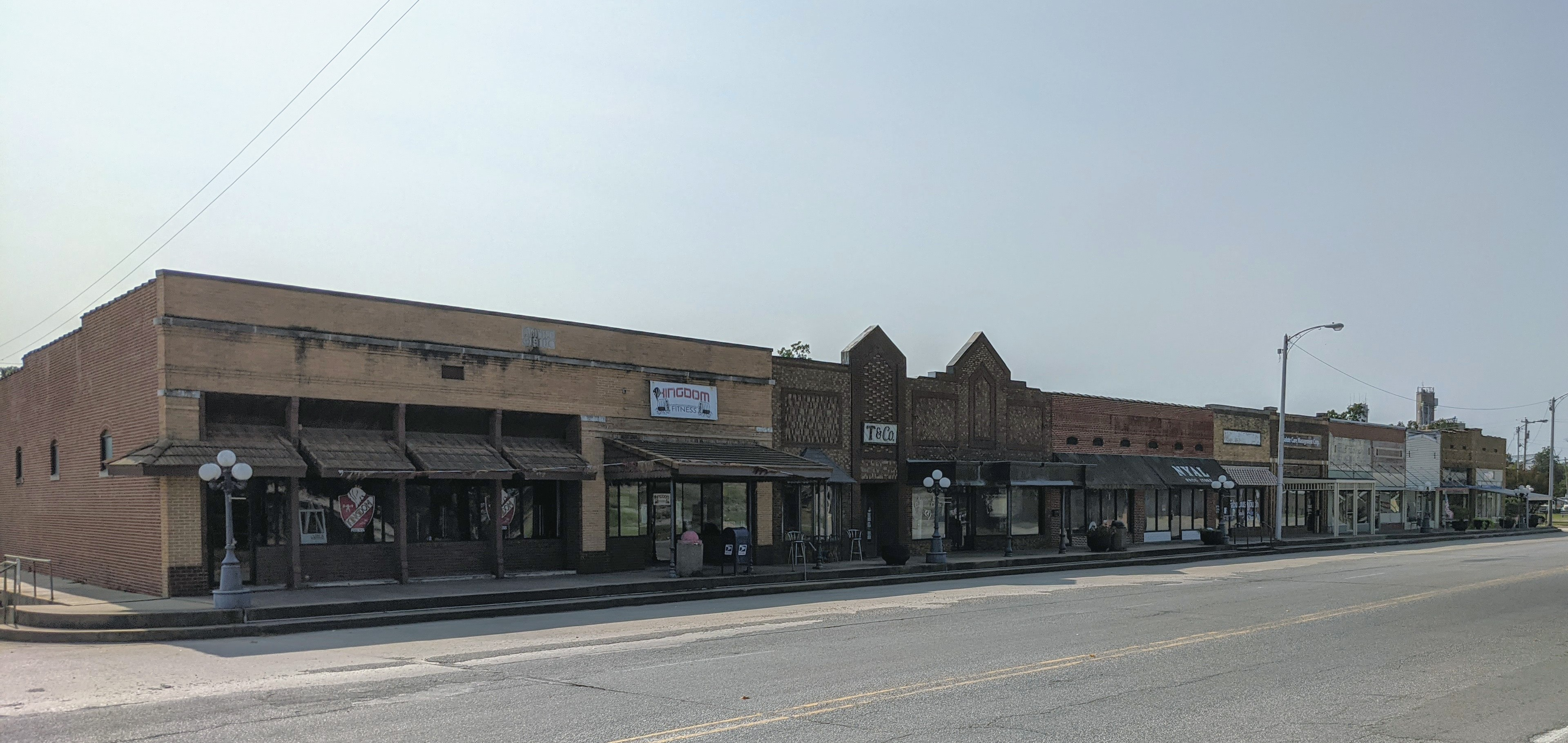

- Flag Seal

- Location of Marked Tree in Poinsett County, Arkansas.
- Coordinates: 35°31′30″N 90°25′31″W
- Country: United States
- State: Arkansas
- County: Poinsett

Area
  - Total: 5.81 sq mi (15.05 km^{2})
  - Land: 5.77 sq mi (14.95 km^{2})
  - Water: 0.039 sq mi (0.10 km^{2})
- Elevation: 203 ft (62 m)

Population (2020)
  - Total: 2,286
  - Estimate (2025): 2,208 ▼
  - Density: 396.1/sq mi (152.92/km^{2})
- Time zone: UTC-6 (Central (CST))
  - Summer (DST): UTC-5 (CDT)
- ZIP code: 72365
- Area code: 870
- FIPS code: 05-44210
- GNIS feature ID: 2405025

Marked Tree is a city in Poinsett County, Arkansas, United States, along the St. Francis River, at the mouth of the Little River. The population was 2,286 at the 2020 census. It is included in the Jonesboro, Arkansas, metropolitan statistical area.

Geologically, the area marks the southern end of the New Madrid Fault. In 1843, a magnitude 6.3 earthquake occurred near the city.

== History ==
The city got its name from a tree located on the bank of the St. Francis River until 1890 that had been blazed to mark a section of the river where Native Americans could walk about 120 yards (110 m) across land to reach the Little River and avoid paddling 12 mi (19 km) upstream. Marked Tree has been noted on lists of unusual place names.

In 1896, The Commercial Appeal reported that around eight years prior, the town had been a place where "no negroes were allowed to live in Marked Tree, and a delegation of citizens was organized to drive them out."

== Geography ==
Marked Tree is located on the St. Francis River at the intersection of US Route 63 and Arkansas Highways 140, 149, and 308. The south end of the Marked Tree Floodway lies just west of the city.

According to the United States Census Bureau, the city has a total area of 2.3 square miles (6.0 km^{2}), of which 2.3 square miles (6.0 km^{2}) are land and 0.04 square miles (0.10 km^{2}) (0.85%) is covered by water.

== Demographics ==
Historical population
Census	Pop.	Note	%±
1900	352		—
1910	2,026		475.6%
1920	1,318		−34.9%
1930	2,276		72.7%
1940	2,685		18.0%
1950	2,878		7.2%
1960	3,216		11.7%
1970	3,229		0.4%
1980	3,201		−0.9%
1990	3,100		−3.2%
2000	2,800		−9.7%
2010	2,566		−8.4%
2020	2,286		−10.9%
2025 (est.)	2,208	▼	−3.4%
U.S. Decennial Census

=== 2020 census ===
As of the 2020 census, there were 2,286 people, 922 households, and 585 families residing in the city. The median age was 43.3 years. 22.4% of residents were under the age of 18 and 20.9% of residents were 65 years of age or older. For every 100 females there were 85.0 males, and for every 100 females age 18 and over there were 79.7 males age 18 and over.

0.0% of residents lived in urban areas, while 100.0% lived in rural areas.

There were 922 households in Marked Tree, of which 29.7% had children under the age of 18 living in them. Of all households, 30.6% were married-couple households, 20.0% were households with a male householder and no spouse or partner present, and 42.5% were households with a female householder and no spouse or partner present. About 34.1% of all households were made up of individuals and 15.8% had someone living alone who was 65 years of age or older.

There were 1,083 housing units, of which 14.9% were vacant. The homeowner vacancy rate was 2.8% and the rental vacancy rate was 14.9%.

Marked Tree racial composition
Race	Number	Percentage
White (non-Hispanic)	1,433	62.69%
Black or African American (non-Hispanic)	680	29.75%
Native American	1	0.04%
Other/Mixed	106	4.64%
Hispanic or Latino	66	2.89%

=== 2000 census ===
As of the census of 2000, 2,800 people, 1,126 households, and 731 families were residing in the city. The population density was 1,208.8 inhabitants per square mile (466.7/km^{2}). The 1,234 housing units averaged 532.7 per square mile (205.4/km^{2}). The racial makeup of the city was 50.36% White, 47.07% African American, 0.11% Native American, 0.29% Asian, 1.25% from other races, and 0.93% from two or more races. About 2.07% of the population were Hispanics or Latinos of any race.

Of the 1,126 households, 29.7% had children under the age of 18 living with them, 41.9% were married couples living together, 19.4% had a female householder with no husband present, and 35.0% were not families. About 31.9% of all households were made up of individuals, and 14.5% had someone living alone who was 65 years of age or older. The average household size was 2.39, and the average family size was 3.04.

In the city, the population was distributed as 26.5% under the age of 18, 8.4% from 18 to 24, 24.1% from 25 to 44, 21.9% from 45 to 64, and 19.1% who were 65 years of age or older. The median age was 38 years. For every 100 females, there were 87.4 males. For every 100 females age 18 and over, there were 79.0 males.

The median income for a household in the city was $22,591, and for a family was $30,197. Males had a median income of $26,305 versus $19,602 for females. The per capita income for the city was $11,867. About 25.6% of families and 32.3% of the population were below the poverty line, including 47.4% of those under age 18 and 28.0% of those age 65 or over.

== Education ==
Public education for early childhood, elementary, and secondary-school students is provided by the Marked Tree School District. Until 1966, a dual system of education was provided with one set of schools for White children, and a different set for Blacks. The first school for Blacks was built in 1938, and was named George Washington Carver from 1952 until it was closed in 1966.

As of 2018, the Marked Tree School District consists of:

- Marked Tree Elementary School, serving prekindergarten through 6th grade
- Marked Tree High School, serving grades 7 through 12

== Notable people ==
- Fannie Lewis, Cleveland, Ohio's longest-serving councilwoman, was from Marked Tree.

== See also ==
- List of sundown towns in the United States
