= Greenfield, Arkansas =

Unincorporated community in Arkansas, US

Greenfield
- Interactive map of Greenfield
- Coordinates: 35°37′56″N 90°42′45″W
- Country: United States
- Arkansas: County
- Elevation: 253 ft (77 m)
- GNIS feature ID: 77071

Greenfield is an unincorporated community in Poinsett County, Arkansas, United States. A railroad town founded along the Missouri Pacific Railroad, it lies five miles north of Harrisburg, and approximately ten miles south of Jonesboro on the new Highway 1. The town lies at the foot of Crowley's Ridge, a lengthy formation that stretches for miles across the state.

At one time, Greenfield had a railway depot, passenger train service, five general mercantile establishments, two churches, a hotel, a saw mill, a cotton gin, flour mill, and numerous personal residences, though today, only the churches and houses remain. During the 19th century, loggers nearly clear cut the region for timber. Today, farms raise soybeans, rice, wheat, milo, cotton, and corn.

Greenfield is a small community, with a population of 1,162 in 2022. The median age was 31.1 and the median income was $28,818.

The University of Arkansas at Fayetteville purchased land on the west side of Highway 1 which is a mile or two north of Greenfield. Construction later began on the future home of the Northeast Rice Research and Extension Center. A pre-existing reservoir irrigates the farm, in addition to water being pumped from the L’Anguille River and a deep well was created 2023. In 2024, the $18.5 million center officially opened and is run by the Arkansas Agricultural Experiment Station.
