= Fannie Lewis =

Civil rights activist, politician

Member of Cleveland City Council from Ward 7
- In office January 2, 1980 – August 11, 2008

Personal details
- Born: June 6, 1926 Memphis, Tennessee, U.S.
- Died: August 11, 2008 (aged 82) Cleveland, Ohio, U.S.
- Party: Democratic

Fannie Lewis (June 6, 1926 – August 11, 2008) was Cleveland, Ohio's longest-serving councilwoman and civil rights activist, best known for the Fannie Lewis Law requiring government contracts in Cleveland provide for employment of local workers.

In 1986, Lewis was selected to be a member of a delegation of Black female politicians who traveled to China as representatives of the United States. Several members of the delegation included prominent National political figures including Congress Woman Maxine Waters and House Representative Woman Dianne Watson, both of California.

== Early life ==
Lewis was born in Memphis, Tennessee. She spent her early years in Marked Tree, Arkansas, before moving to Memphis, where, as a teenager she attended Booker T. Washington High in Memphis, Tennessee. At Booker T. she lettered in two sports, Basketball and Track. During the late Thirties, Lewis, who also excelled in baseball, was on a traveling female Barnstorming team, who, after agreeing to scrimmage an all white female team, were threaten with lynching by white spectators who felt her team was deliberately running up the score on their white opponents. Lewis and her teammates were forced to sprint to their already running pickup to escape the wrath of the white patrons.

As a child, she worked in the fields picking cotton in Marion, Arkansas, where she witnessed a white farmer publicly murder one of her friends from school without facing repercussions. Her schoolteacher, also from Marion, was tied to a tree and burned to death for teaching black children to read.

== Cleveland city council ==
Lewis, a Democrat, served on the Cleveland City Council from January 2, 1980 until her death on August 11, 2008, making her the longest-serving female council member in the history of the city. She clashed with established politicians, calling Mayor Michael White a demon, Councilman Joe Cimperman a Judas Goat, and mayor George Voinovich crazy. She met with George W. Bush in 2002, who stated "I had the honor of listening to a local elected official, Ms. Fannie Lewis, who had some things to say." Lewis was featured in the documentary No Umbrella: Election Day in the City, which highlighted her efforts to get more voting machines to her constituents precincts, as they were made to stand in the rain for hours waiting to vote. She was known for advocating the Cleveland School voucher program and for the Fannie Lewis Law, a 2003 statute that requires a portion of public works projects in Cleveland to be performed by Cleveland residents.
