= Manila High School (Arkansas) =

Location
- 419 East Olympia Street; Manila, Arkansas 72442; United States
- Coordinates: 35°52′46″N 90°9′24″W

Information
- School type: Public comprehensive
- Motto: A Great Place To Be
- Status: Open
- School district: Manila School District
- CEEB code: 041535
- NCES School ID: 050004600668
- Teaching staff: 44.54 (on FTE basis)
- Grades: 9–12
- Enrollment: 493 (2023-2024)
- Student to teacher ratio: 11.07
- Education system: ADE Smart Core
- Classes offered: Regular, Advanced Placement (AP)
- Colors: Black and gold
- Athletics: Football, golf, cross country, basketball, baseball, softball, track, cheer
- Athletics conference: 3A Region 3
- Mascot: Lion
- Team name: Manila Lions
- Accreditation: ADE; AdvancED (1966–)
- Feeder to: Manila Middle School (grades 5–8)
- Affiliation: Arkansas Activities Association
- Website: high.manilaschools.org

Manila High School is an accredited and nationally recognized comprehensive public high school for students in grades 9 through 12 located in Manila, Arkansas, United States. Manila High School is one of six public high schools in Mississippi County and the only high school of the Manila School District. For the 2010–11 school year, the high school instructed more than 280 students with more than 23 classroom teachers employed on a full time equivalent basis.

== Academics ==
Manila High School is accredited by the Arkansas Department of Education (ADE) and has been accredited by AdvancED (formerly North Central Association) since 1966. The assumed course of study follows the ADE Smart Core curriculum, which requires students complete at least 22 units prior to graduation. Students complete regular (core and career focus) coursework and exams and may take Advanced Placement (AP) courses and exam with the opportunity to receive college credit prior to graduation.

The Manila School District is one of 35 school districts listed as "Achieving" (the highest rating) by the Arkansas Department of Education in support of Adequate Yearly Progress and Augmented Benchmark Examinations.

== Athletics ==
The high school emblem (mascot) of the Lion and colors of black and gold have been shared by all schools in the district.

For 2012–14, the Manila Lions compete in interscholastic activities within the 3A Classification in the 3A Region 3 Conference administered by the Arkansas Activities Association. The Bobcats play within the 4A Region 1 Conference. Manila fields varsity teams in football, golf (boys/girls), cross country (boys/girls), basketball (boys/girls), cheer, baseball, fastpitch softball, track and field (boys/girls).

- Golf: The boys golf teams have won four state golf championships (1973, 1975, 1993, 1998).
- Basketball: The girls basketball team won a state basketball championship in 1958. The boys basketball team hold two state championships, one in 1962 and 2023.
- Notable Alumni: Michael Dover 1997, Luke Kirk 2023

== See also ==
- Manila School District
- Manila, Arkansas
