= Floodway, Arkansas =

- Unincorporated community
- Location within Arkansas Location within the United States
- Coordinates: 35°46′43″N 90°10′41″W
- Country: United States
- State: Arkansas
- County: Mississippi
- Elevation: 236 ft (72 m)
- Time zone: UTC-6 (Central (CST))
  - Summer (DST): UTC-5 (CDT)
- Area code: 870
- GNIS feature ID: 61865

Floodway is an unincorporated community in Mississippi County, Arkansas, United States. Floodway is located at the junction of Arkansas highways 77 and 158, 7 miles (11 km) south of Manila.
