= Whitton, Arkansas =

- Unincorporated community
- Location within Arkansas Location within the United States
- Coordinates: 35°30′41″N 90°16′06″W
- Country: United States
- State: Arkansas
- County: Mississippi
- Elevation: 223 ft (68 m)
- Time zone: UTC-6 (Central (CST))
  - Summer (DST): UTC-5 (CDT)
- Area code: 870
- GNIS feature ID: 58879

Whitton is an unincorporated community in Mississippi County, Arkansas, United States. The community is on Arkansas Highway 118 and Cross Bayou flows past to the north.
