= West Ridge, Arkansas =

- Unincorporated community
- Location within Arkansas Location within the United States
- Coordinates: 35°40′59″N 90°15′45″W
- Country: United States
- State: Arkansas
- County: Mississippi
- Elevation: 226 ft (69 m)
- Time zone: UTC-6 (Central (CST))
  - Summer (DST): UTC-5 (CDT)
- ZIP code: 72391
- Area code: 870
- GNIS feature ID: 66888

West Ridge is an unincorporated community in Mississippi County, Arkansas, United States. West Ridge is located on Arkansas Highway 140, 3.5 miles (5.6 km) south-southwest of Etowah. West Ridge has a post office with ZIP code 72391.
