= Birdsong, Arkansas =

- Town
- Location in Mississippi County, Arkansas
- Coordinates: 35°27′40″N 90°15′35″W
- Country: United States
- State: Arkansas
- County: Mississippi

Area
  - Total: 0.20 sq mi (0.52 km^{2})
  - Land: 0.20 sq mi (0.52 km^{2})
  - Water: 0 sq mi (0.00 km^{2})
- Elevation: 223 ft (68 m)

Population (2020)
  - Total: 32
  - Estimate (2025): 28 ▼
  - Density: 158.6/sq mi (61.25/km^{2})
- Time zone: UTC-6 (Central (CST))
  - Summer (DST): UTC-5 (CDT)
- ZIP Code: 72386 (Tyronza)
- FIPS code: 05-06340
- GNIS feature ID: 2405267

Birdsong is a town in Mississippi County, Arkansas, United States. The population was 32 at the 2020 census, down from 41 in 2010.

== Geography ==
The town is in the southwest corner of Mississippi County, 4 miles (6 km) north of Gilmore, 6 miles (10 km) southeast of Tyronza, and 5 miles (8 km) southwest of Joiner. Osceola, the county seat, is 27 miles (43 km) to the northeast.

According to the United States Census Bureau, the town of Birdsong has a total area of 0.2 square miles (0.5 km^{2}), all land.

== Demographics ==
Historical population
Census	Pop.	Note	%±
1990	104		—
2000	40		−61.5%
2010	41		2.5%
2020	32		−22.0%
2025 (est.)	28	▼	−12.5%
U.S. Decennial Census; 2014 Estimate

=== 2020 census ===
Birdsong town, Arkansas – Racial and ethnic composition Note: the US Census treats Hispanic/Latino as an ethnic category. This table excludes Latinos from the racial categories and assigns them to a separate category. Hispanics/Latinos may be of any race.
Race / Ethnicity (NH = Non-Hispanic)	Pop 2000	Pop 2010	Pop 2020	% 2000	% 2010	% 2020
White alone (NH)	0	12	3	0.00%	29.27%	9.38%
Black or African American alone (NH)	40	29	26	100.00%	70.73%	81.25%
Native American or Alaska Native alone (NH)	0	0	0	0.00%	0.00%	0.00%
Asian alone (NH)	0	0	0	0.00%	0.00%	0.00%
Pacific Islander alone (NH)	0	0	0	0.00%	0.00%	0.00%
Some Other Race alone (NH)	0	0	0	0.00%	0.00%	0.00%
Mixed race or Multiracial (NH)	0	0	1	0.00%	0.00%	3.13%
Hispanic or Latino (any race)	0	0	2	100.00%	100.00%	6.25%
Total	40	41	32	100.00%	100.00%	100.00%

As of the 2010 United States census, there were 41 people living in the town. The racial makeup of the town was 70.7% African American and 29.3% White.

As of the census of 2000, there were 40 people, 20 households, and 8 families living in the town. The population density was 140.4 people/km^{2} (364 people/mi^{2}). There were 27 housing units at an average density of 94.8 units/km^{2} (246 units/mi^{2}). The racial makeup of the town was 100% Black or African American.

There were 20 households, out of which two had children under the age of 18 living with them, 15.0% were married couples living together, 15.0% had a female householder with no husband present, and 60.0% were non-families. 60.0% of all households were made up of individuals, and 30.0% had someone living alone who was 65 years of age or older. The average household size was 2.00 and the average family size was 3.38.

In the town, the population was spread out, with 15.0% under the age of 18, 12.5% from 18 to 24, 22.5% from 25 to 44, 30.0% from 45 to 64, and 20.0% who were 65 years of age or older. The median age was 45 years. For every 100 females, there were 81.8 males. For every 100 females age 18 and over, there were 78.9 males.

The median income for a household in the town was $6,806, and the median income for a family was $7,083. Males had a median income of $18,750 versus $28,750 for females. The per capita income for the town was $9,363. There were 57.1% of families and 56.3% of the population living below the poverty line, including none under 18 and 100.0% of those over 64.
