= Caraway, Arkansas =

- City
- Location of Caraway in Craighead County, Arkansas.
- Coordinates: 35°45′05″N 90°19′22″W
- Country: United States
- State: Arkansas
- County: Craighead
- Incorporated: 1923

Area
  - Total: 2.31 sq mi (5.98 km^{2})
  - Land: 2.31 sq mi (5.97 km^{2})
  - Water: 0.0039 sq mi (0.01 km^{2})
- Elevation: 226 ft (69 m)

Population (2020)
  - Total: 1,133
  - Estimate (2025): 1,104 ▼
  - Density: 491.7/sq mi (189.83/km^{2})
- Time zone: UTC-6 (Central (CST))
  - Summer (DST): UTC-5 (CDT)
- ZIP code: 72419
- Area code: 870
- FIPS code: 05-11410
- GNIS feature ID: 2403991
- Website: www.cityofcarawayar.org

Caraway is a city in Craighead County, Arkansas, United States. The population was 1,133 at the 2020 census. It is included in the Jonesboro, Arkansas Metropolitan Statistical Area.

== History ==
The town originally began as a lumber camp known as White Switch in 1912. It was incorporated in 1923, taking its name from then-U.S. Senator Thaddeus H. Caraway.

== Geography ==
Caraway is located in the Arkansas Delta region. According to the United States Census Bureau, the town has a total area of 6.0 km^{2} (2.3 sq mi), all land.

Ecologically, Caraway is located within the St. Francis Lowlands ecoregion within the larger Mississippi Alluvial Plain. The St. Francis Lowlands are a flat region mostly covered with row crop agriculture today, though also containing sand blows and sunken lands remaining from the 1811–12 New Madrid earthquakes. Waterways have mostly been channelized, causing loss of aquatic and riparian wildlife habitat.town. The St. Francis Sunken Lands Wildlife Management Area, which preserves some of the bottomland hardwood forest typical of this ecoregion prior to development for row agriculture lies just west of Caraway along the St. Francis River.

=== List Of Highways ===
- Highway 135
- Highway 139
- Highway 158

== Demographics ==
Historical population
Census	Pop.	Note	%±
1930	425		—
1940	477		12.2%
1950	970		103.4%
1960	821		−15.4%
1970	952		16.0%
1980	1,165		22.4%
1990	1,178		1.1%
2000	1,349		14.5%
2010	1,279		−5.2%
2020	1,133		−11.4%
2025 (est.)	1,104	▼	−2.6%
U.S. Decennial Census

=== 2020 census ===
As of the 2020 census, Caraway had a population of 1,133. The median age was 41.7 years. 25.4% of residents were under the age of 18 and 19.2% of residents were 65 years of age or older. For every 100 females there were 93.0 males, and for every 100 females age 18 and over there were 86.5 males age 18 and over.

0.0% of residents lived in urban areas, while 100.0% lived in rural areas.

There were 490 households in Caraway, of which 32.2% had children under the age of 18 living in them. Of all households, 41.8% were married-couple households, 19.2% were households with a male householder and no spouse or partner present, and 33.3% were households with a female householder and no spouse or partner present. About 34.3% of all households were made up of individuals and 17.6% had someone living alone who was 65 years of age or older.

There were 540 housing units, of which 9.3% were vacant. The homeowner vacancy rate was 2.2% and the rental vacancy rate was 7.3%.

Caraway racial composition
Race	Number	Percentage
White (non-Hispanic)	1,068	94.26%
Black or African American (non-Hispanic)	1	0.09%
Native American	3	0.26%
Other/Mixed	36	3.18%
Hispanic or Latino	25	2.21%

=== 2000 census ===
As of the census of 2000, there were 1,349 people, 547 households, and 386 families residing in the town. The population density was 224.5 people/km^{2} (581 people/mi^{2}). There were 606 housing units at an average density of 100.9 units/km^{2} (261 units/mi^{2}). The racial makeup of the town was 97.63% White, 0.07% Native American, 0.07% Asian, 1.33% from other races, and 0.89% from two or more races. 2.89% of the population were Hispanic or Latino of any race.

There were 547 households, out of which 34.9% had children under the age of 18 living with them, 54.1% were married couples living together, 13.2% had a female householder with no husband present, and 29.4% were non-families. 27.6% of all households were made up of individuals, and 14.6% had someone living alone who was 65 years of age or older. The average household size was 2.41 and the average family size was 2.93.

In the town the population was spread out, with 25.4% under the age of 18, 9.0% from 18 to 24, 25.8% from 25 to 44, 24.9% from 45 to 64, and 14.9% who were 65 years of age or older. The median age was 37 years. For every 100 females, there were 87.9 males. For every 100 females age 18 and over, there were 80.9 males.

The median income for a household in the town was $22,279, and the median income for a family was $26,600. Males had a median income of $25,809 versus $17,000 for females. The per capita income for the town was $11,647. About 21.9% of families and 26.3% of the population were below the poverty line, including 37.1% of those under age 18 and 35.6% of those age 65 or over.

== Education ==
It is a part of the Riverside School District. It was served by the Caraway School District until it consolidated into Riverside on July 1, 1985.

== Notable people ==
- Nick Bacon, an army first sergeant during the Vietnam War and recipient of the Medal of Honor
- Deleta Williams, Missouri state representative
