= Etowah, Arkansas =

- Town
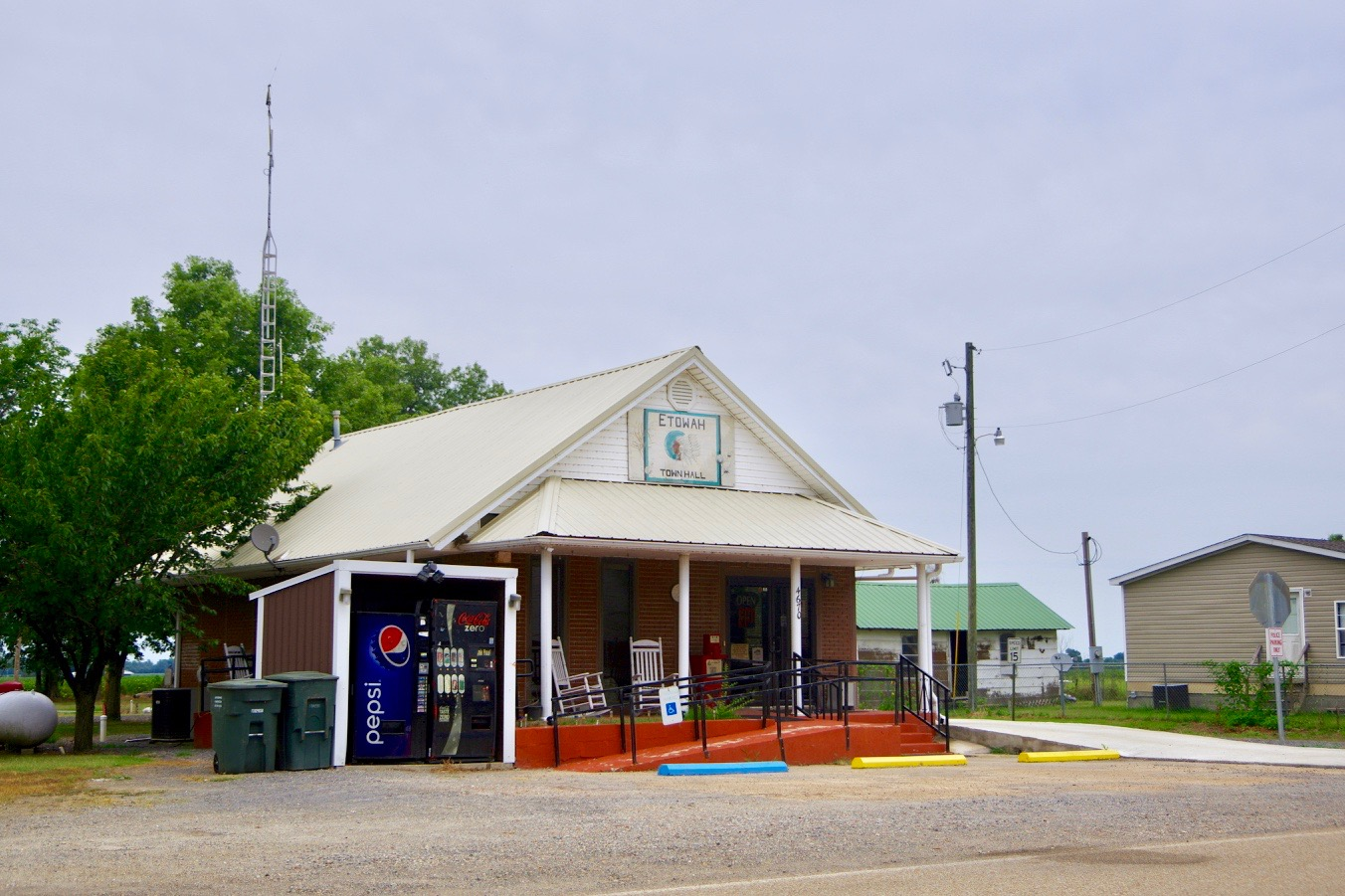
- Etowah Town Hall

- Location in Mississippi County, Arkansas
- Coordinates: 35°43′20″N 90°13′56″W
- Country: United States
- State: Arkansas
- County: Mississippi

Government
  - Type: Mayor-council
  - Mayor: Bo McCullom (IND)

Area
  - Total: 5.94 sq mi (15.39 km^{2})
  - Land: 5.94 sq mi (15.38 km^{2})
  - Water: 0.0039 sq mi (0.01 km^{2})
- Elevation: 230 ft (70 m)

Population (2020)
  - Total: 254
  - Estimate (2025): 237 ▼
  - Density: 42.8/sq mi (16.51/km^{2})
- Time zone: UTC-6 (Central (CST))
  - Summer (DST): UTC-5 (CDT)
- ZIP code: 72428
- Area code: 870
- FIPS code: 05-22120
- GNIS feature ID: 2406467

Etowah is a town in Mississippi County, Arkansas, United States. The population was 254 at the 2020 census, down from 351 in 2010.

== History and government ==
Etowah began as a settlement established for workers of the Chapman and Dewey Lumber Company in the 1890s. When a post office was established in 1902, the name "Etowah" was chosen after several other names had been rejected by the postal service. Etowah incorporated as a town in 1996.

In recent years few have run against Mayor McCullom (Mayor Bo), who usually runs unopposed. Similarly, the seven City Council members are usually re-elected.

== Geography ==
Etowah is located in western Mississippi County. The town is concentrated along Arkansas Highway 136 10 miles (16 km) northeast of Lepanto and 14 miles (23 km) south of Manila. It is 17 miles (27 km) west of Osceola, the county seat. Etowah's municipal boundaries stretch southward to Arkansas Highway 140 and eastward to Arkansas Highway 77. The Left Hand Chute of the Little River passes through the southeastern part of the town.

According to the United States Census Bureau, the town of Etowah has a total area of 5.9 square miles (15 km^{2}), of which 0.005 square miles (0.013 km^{2}), or 0.08%, are water.

== Demographics ==
Historical population
Census	Pop.	Note	%±
2000	366		—
2010	351		−4.1%
2020	254		−27.6%
2025 (est.)	237	▼	−6.7%
U.S. Decennial Census; 2014 Estimate

As of the 2010 United States census, there were 351 people living in the town. The racial makeup of the town was 89.5% White, 1.1% Black, 0.3% Asian and 2.0% from two or more races. 7.1% were Hispanic or Latino of any race.

As of the census of 2000, there were 366 people, 137 households, and 106 families living in the town. The population density was 24.0 people/km^{2} (62 people/mi^{2}). There were 153 housing units at an average density of 10.0 units/km^{2} (26 units/mi^{2}). The racial makeup of the town was 94.81% White, 1.37% Black or African American, 1.64% Native American, 0.55% from other races, and 1.64% from two or more races. 0.82% of the population were Hispanic or Latino of any race.

There were 137 households, out of which 36.5% had children under the age of 18 living with them, 60.6% were married couples living together, 11.7% had a female householder with no husband present, and 22.6% were non-families. 18.2% of all households were made up of individuals, and 6.6% had someone living alone who was 65 years of age or older. The average household size was 2.67 and the average family size was 3.07.

In the town, the population was spread out, with 28.1% under the age of 18, 7.4% from 18 to 24, 31.1% from 25 to 44, 21.9% from 45 to 64, and 11.5% who were 65 years of age or older. The median age was 34 years. For every 100 females, there were 94.7 males. For every 100 females age 18 and over, there were 105.5 males.

The median income for a household in the town was $21,563, and the median income for a family was $23,750. Males had a median income of $19,643 versus $17,679 for females. The per capita income for the town was $8,890. About 13.3% of families and 19.1% of the population were below the poverty line, including 20.5% of those under age 18 and 23.6% of those age 65 or over.

== Education ==
The Manila School District operates area public schools. The Etowah School District consolidated into the Manila district on July 1, 1986. The board of education of the Etowah district had asked for the merger. Because some people in Etowah wanted to consolidate into the Lepanto School District of Lepanto, a lawsuit was filed to stop the merger, but the Circuit Court of Mississippi County upheld the merger to the Manila district.
