= Joiner, Arkansas =

- City
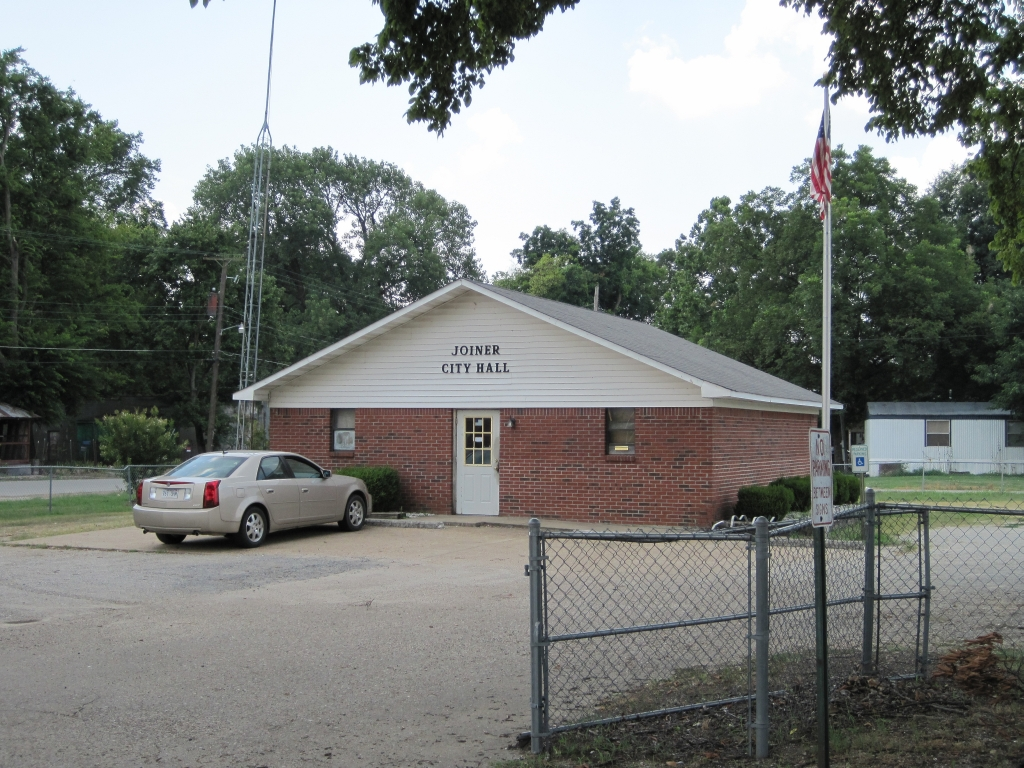
- Joiner City Hall

- Location in Mississippi County, Arkansas
- Coordinates: 35°30′35″N 90°09′01″W
- Country: United States
- State: Arkansas
- County: Mississippi
- Incorporated: March 20, 1922

Government
  - Mayor: Michelle Williams

Area
  - Total: 0.61 sq mi (1.59 km^{2})
  - Land: 0.61 sq mi (1.59 km^{2})
  - Water: 0 sq mi (0.00 km^{2})
- Elevation: 233 ft (71 m)

Population (2020)
  - Total: 498
  - Estimate (2025): 465 ▼
  - Density: 809.3/sq mi (312.48/km^{2})
- Time zone: UTC-6 (Central (CST))
  - Summer (DST): UTC-5 (CDT)
- ZIP code: 72350
- Area code: 870
- FIPS code: 05-35650
- GNIS feature ID: 2404810

Joiner is a city in Mississippi County, Arkansas, United States. The population was 498 as of the 2020 census, down from 576 at the 2010 census.

== History ==
Conflicting histories point to Joiner originally being settled in the 1880s by two different men. First, there was D.C. Joyner, a doctor from Stewart County, Tennessee. He came to Mississippi County after 1861 and settled in what is now the city of Joiner before 1888. Second, there was R.L. Joiner, a businessman from Shelby County, Tennessee. Joiner came to Mississippi County in 1868, and settled at what is now the city of Joiner in 1880.

At some point prior to 1903, executives from the St. Louis & San Francisco Railway traveled to Mississippi County and met with Rufus Joiner. "After an evening of dinner and entertainment" the railway executives decided to construct a depot in the vicinity of the Joiner household and name it after the family. The depot was constructed in 1903. The following year, the nascent community received a post office.

== Geography ==
Joiner is located in southern Mississippi County at 35°30′26″N 90°9′1″W (35.507345, -90.150245). U.S. Route 61 passes through the city center, leading northeast 19 miles (31 km) to Osceola and southwest 12 miles (19 km) to Turrell. Interstate 55 passes less than 2 miles (3 km) west of Joiner, with access from Exit 34 (Arkansas Highway 118).

According to the United States Census Bureau, the city has a total area of 0.6 square miles (1.6 km^{2}), all land.

== Demographics ==
Historical population
Census	Pop.	Note	%±
1930	306		—
1940	388		26.8%
1950	596		53.6%
1960	748		25.5%
1970	839		12.2%
1980	725		−13.6%
1990	645		−11.0%
2000	540		−16.3%
2010	576		6.7%
2020	498		−13.5%
2025 (est.)	465	▼	−6.6%
U.S. Decennial Census

=== 2020 census ===
Joiner Racial Composition
Race	Num.	Perc.
White	171	34.34%
Black or African American	291	58.43%
Asian	3	0.6%
Other/Mixed	11	2.21%
Hispanic or Latino	22	4.42%

As of the 2020 United States census, there were 498 people, 227 households, and 100 families residing in the city.

=== 2010 census ===
As of the 2010 United States census, there were 576 people living in the city. The racial makeup of the city was 50.0% White, 47.2% Black and 0.2% Native American. 2.6% were Hispanic or Latino of any race.

=== 2000 census ===
As of the census of 2000, there were 540 people, 197 households, and 139 families living in the city. The population density was 1,860.0 inhabitants per square mile (718.2/km^{2}). There were 223 housing units at an average density of 768.1 per square mile (296.6/km^{2}). The racial makeup of the city was 52.78% White, 45.93% Black or African American, 0.37% from other races, and 0.93% from two or more races. 0.74% of the population were Hispanic or Latino of any race.

There were 197 households, out of which 37.1% had children under the age of 18 living with them, 39.1% were married couples living together, 26.4% had a female householder with no husband present, and 29.4% were non-families. 25.4% of all households were made up of individuals, and 11.7% had someone living alone who was 65 years of age or older. The average household size was 2.74 and the average family size was 3.29.

In the city, the population was spread out, with 29.8% under the age of 18, 12.0% from 18 to 24, 23.5% from 25 to 44, 21.9% from 45 to 64, and 12.8% who were 65 years of age or older. The median age was 33 years. For every 100 females, there were 80.0 males. For every 100 females age 18 and over, there were 72.3 males.

The median income for a household in the city was $26,875, and the median income for a family was $30,000. Males had a median income of $28,750 versus $20,208 for females. The per capita income for the city was $10,454. About 27.7% of families and 27.5% of the population were below the poverty line, including 35.3% of those under age 18 and 23.4% of those age 65 or over.

== Notable people ==
- Alvin S. Bennett - born in Joiner in 1926, record company executive for whom the character Alvin Seville of Alvin and the Chipmunks was named
