= KLCN =

Radio station in Blytheville, Arkansas (1927–2017)

- Blytheville, Arkansas; United States
- Broadcast area: Blytheville, Arkansas; Dyersburg, Tennessee; Covington, Tennessee; Kennett, Missouri
- Frequency: 910 kHz

Ownership
- Owner: Sudbury Services, Inc.
- Sister stations: KAMJ, KHLS, KHPA, KNBY, KOKR, KOSE, KQXF, KTPA, KXAR

History
- First air date: August 15, 1927
- Last air date: May 4, 2017
- Former frequencies: 1050 kHz (1927–1928); 1290 kHz (1928–1941); 1320 kHz (1941); 900 kHz (1941–1953)
- Call sign meaning: Charles Leo "Dutch" Lintzenich and Courier-News (founders)

Technical information
- Facility ID: 63606
- Class: D
- Power: 5,000 watts (day); 85 watts (night)
- Transmitter coordinates: 35°55′27.3″N 89°52′18.3″W

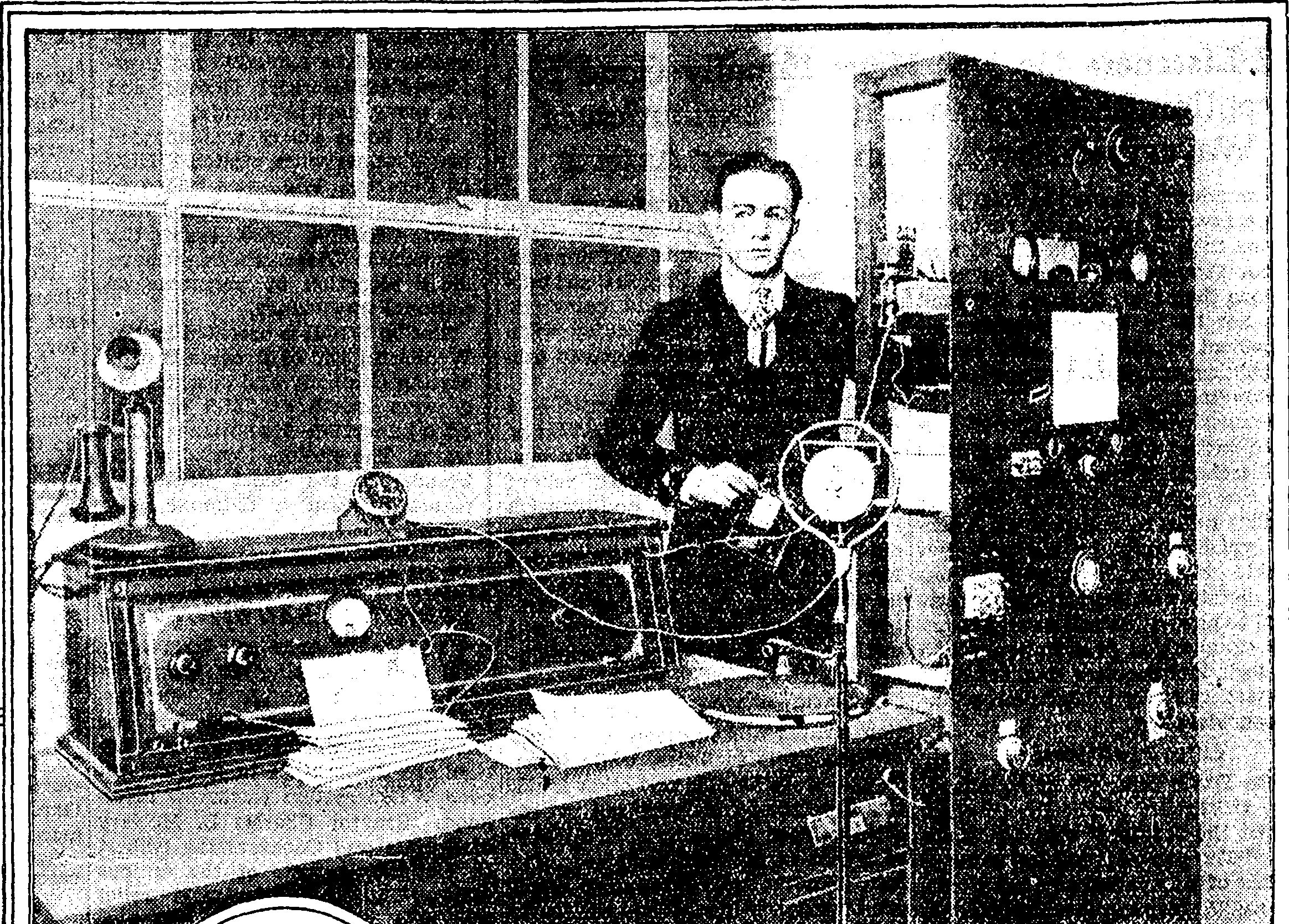
Photograph of KLCN radio station in 1929 from the New York Times.

KLCN was a radio station airing a classic hits format. Formally licensed to Blytheville, Arkansas, broadcasting on 910 AM. The station served the areas of Blytheville, Arkansas, Dyersburg, Tennessee, Covington, Tennessee, and Kennett, Missouri, for nearly 90 years. In the mid-1930s, among the blues musicians who performed live on the station were Calvin Frazier and James "Peck" Curtis. The station was owned by Sudbury Services, Inc.

Sudbury surrendered the license for KLCN to the Federal Communications Commission (FCC) on April 30, 2018, which subsequently cancelled it on December 31, 2018.
