= KTPA (AM) =

Prescott, Arkansas; United States
- Branding: 1370 AM

Programming
- Format: Defunct (was Classic country)

Ownership
- Owner: Newport Broadcasting Company
- Sister stations: KAMJ, KHLS, KHPA, KNBY, KOKR, KOSE, KQXF, & KXAR.

History
- First air date: December 1, 1959
- Last air date: 2022
- Call sign meaning: "Kome To Prescott, Arkansas"

Technical information
- Facility ID: 48745
- Class: D
- Power: 1,000 watts Daytime
- Transmitter coordinates: 33°47′42″N 93°23′41″W

KTPA (1370 AM, "KTPA 1370 AM Classic Country") was a radio station broadcasting a classic country music format. Licensed to Prescott, Arkansas, United States, the station was last owned by Newport Broadcasting Company.

KTPA began broadcasting on December 1, 1959, as a 500-watt, daytime-only station.

KTPA was deleted on February 4, 2022.
