= Arkansas Highway 119 =

State highway in Arkansas, United States

Highway 119
- Segments of AR 119 in red, AR 119Y in blue

Route information
- Maintained by ArDOT

Location
- Country: United States
- State: Arkansas
- Counties: Clay, Mississippi

Highway system
- Arkansas Highway System; Interstate; US; State; Business; Spurs; Suffixed; Scenic; Heritage
← AR 118	→ AR 120

Arkansas Highway 119 (AR 119, Ark. 119, and Hwy. 119) is a series of state highways that run in Northeast Arkansas. All routes are maintained by the Arkansas Department of Transportation (ArDOT).

== Section 0 ==
Highway 119
- Location: Marie–Driver
- Length: 5.640 mi (9.077 km)

Highway 119 is a state highway of 5.73 miles (9.22 km) that runs in Mississippi County. It begins at an intersection with AR 14 in Marie and heads east. After 1.9 miles (3.1 km), it makes a left turn and heads north for about one mile (1.6 km) before turning due east again. It continues east for 1.7 miles (2.7 km) before turning south and ending at an intersection with US 61 in Driver.

Major intersections
The entire route is in Mississippi County.

Location	mi	km	Destinations	Notes
Marie	0.000	0.000	AR 14 to US 61 – Lepanto, Wilson	Southern terminus
Driver	5.640	9.077	US 61 / Great River Road – Osceola, Wilson	Northern terminus
1.000 mi = 1.609 km; 1.000 km = 0.621 mi

== Section 2 ==
Highway 119
- Location: Osceola–Victoria
- Length: 7.208 mi (11.600 km)

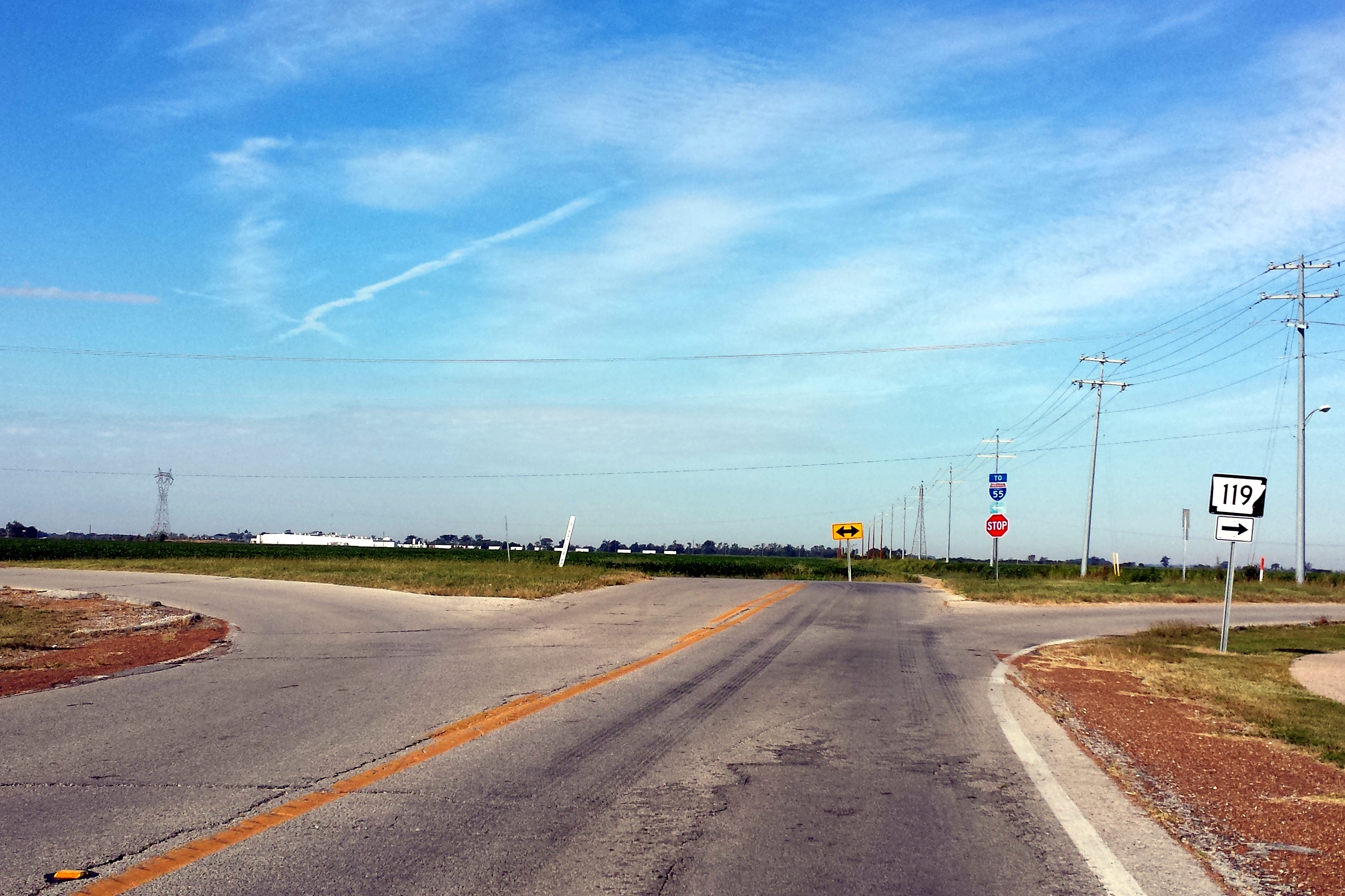
Highway 119 turns north in Osceola

Highway 119 is a 7.22-mile (11.62 km) state highway in Mississippi County running from US 61 in Osceola to AR 158 near Victoria. It begins at the intersection of US 61 (North Walnut Street) and West Semmes Avenue. It travels west intersecting the southern terminus of one segment of AR 325 at North Ermen Lane and the northern terminus of AR 119Y. There, it turns north, then west, and north again before crossing over I-55 and terminating at AR 158 outside the community of Victoria.

This segment of Highway 119 first appeared on the 1945 state highway map, designated between AR 40 (present-day AR 140) and a junction with AR 158 and AR 181.

Major intersections
The entire route is in Mississippi County.

Location	mi	km	Destinations	Notes
Osceola	0.000	0.000	US 61 / Great River Road (Walnut Street)	Southern terminus
Osceola			AR 325 north (Ermen Lane)	AR 325 southern terminus
Osceola			AR 119Y south (Country Club Road)	AR 119Y northern terminus
	7.208	11.600	AR 158 – Victoria, Luxora	Northern terminus
1.000 mi = 1.609 km; 1.000 km = 0.621 mi

=== Osceola spur ===
Highway 119Y
- Location: Osceola
- Length: 0.502 mi (808 m)

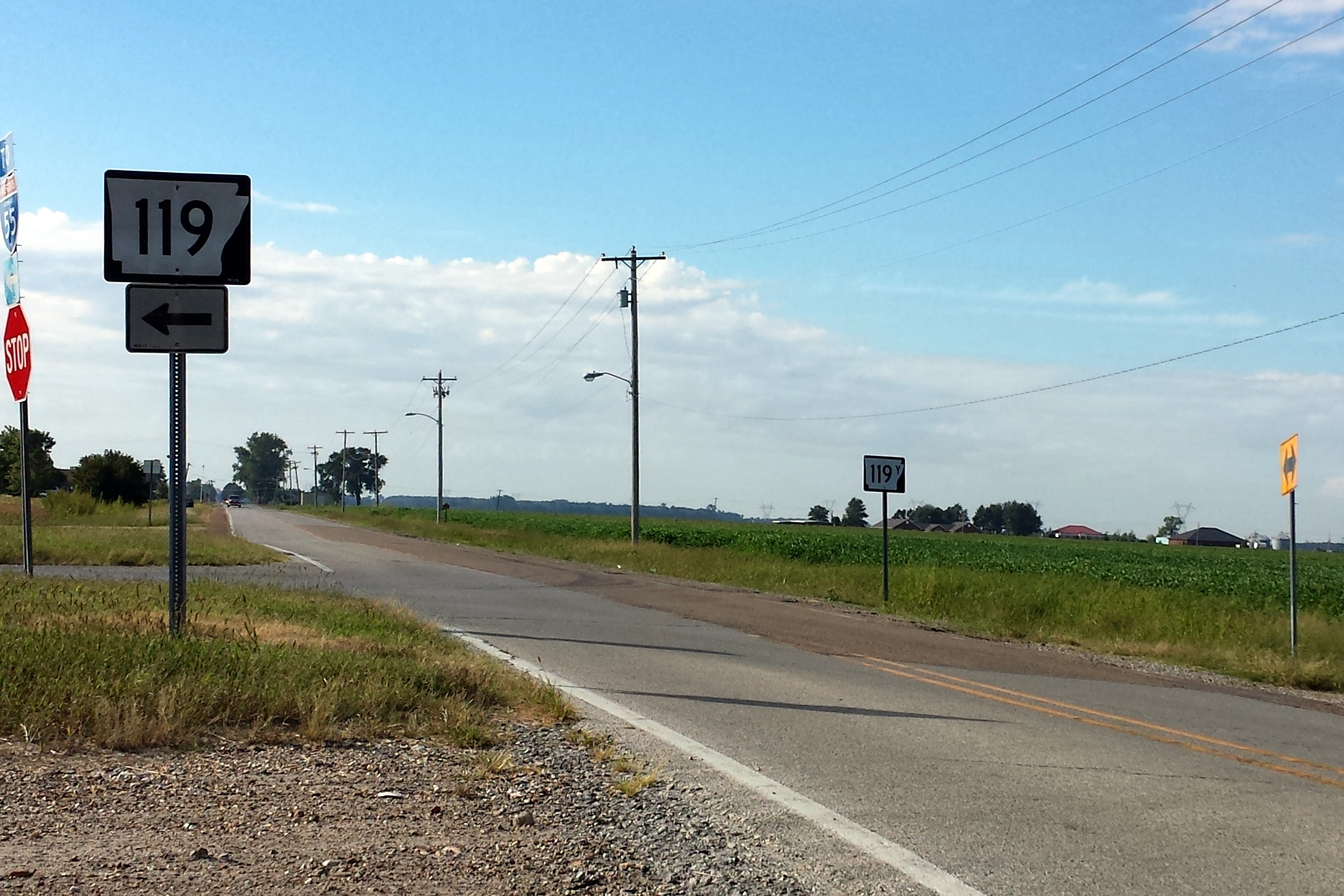
Highway 119Y northern terminus

Highway 119Y is a short 0.54-mile (0.87 km) spur of AR 119 entirely in Osceola, Mississippi County. It connects an intersection of AR 140 north to section 2 of AR 119.

Major intersections
The entire route is in Osceola, Mississippi County.

mi	km	Destinations	Notes
0.000	0.000	AR 119 (Semmes Avenue)	Northern terminus
0.502	0.808	AR 140 north (Keiser Avenue)	Southern terminus
1.000 mi = 1.609 km; 1.000 km = 0.621 mi

== Sections 4 and 5 ==
Highway 119
- Location: Leachville–Missouri state line
- Length: 8.847 mi (14.238 km)

Highway 119 is a 3.36-mile (5.41 km) state highway in Mississippi County that runs from an intersection with AR 18 in Leachville to the Missouri state line.

The route runs north through Leachville to an intersection with Highway 77. The two highways form a concurrency heading east to Poplar Corner. The concurrency ends when Highway 77 turns south; Highway 119 heads north for about 2 miles (3.2 km) before turning east. After one mile (1.6 km), it is in the community of Buckeye and makes a left turn towards the Missouri state line. It travels north for about 2.6 miles (4.2 km) before entering the community of Box Elder and ending at the state line. Missouri Supplemental Route K continues north from the state line and travel to Hornersville, Missouri.

Major intersections
Mile markers reset at concurrencies. The entire route is in Mississippi County.

Location	mi	km	Destinations	Notes
Leachville	0.000	0.000	US 78 / AR 18 – Manila, Monette	Southern terminus
Leachville	3.267	5.258	AR 77 north (Main Street / 3rd Street) – Cardwell, MO, Manila	Begin AR 77 overlap
Poplar Corner	0.000	0.000	AR 77 south	End AR 77 overlap
Box Elder	5.580	8.980	Arkansas–Missouri state line	
Box Elder			Route K – Hornersville, MO	Continuation into Missouri
1.000 mi = 1.609 km; 1.000 km = 0.621 mi: Concurrency terminus

== Section 6 ==
Highway 119
- Location: Rector
- Length: 3.03 mi (4.88 km)

Highway 119 is a 3.03-mile (4.88 km) state highway entirely in Clay County. The route runs north from an intersection with AR 139 near the community of Leonard to an intersection with US 49 in the city of Rector.

Major intersections
The entire route is in Clay County.

Location	mi	km	Destinations	Notes
	0.00	0.00	AR 139	
Rector	3.03	4.88	US 49 – Rector, Piggott	
1.000 mi = 1.609 km; 1.000 km = 0.621 mi

== See also ==
- Arkansas Highway 119 (1927–2022) former alignment in Mississippi County
