= Creamery Package, Arkansas =

- Unincorporated community
- Location within Arkansas Location within the United States
- Coordinates: 35°33′12″N 90°9′53″W
- Country: United States
- State: Arkansas
- County: Mississippi
- Township: Scott
- Elevation: 233 ft (71 m)
- Time zone: UTC-6 (Central (CST))
  - Summer (DST): UTC-5 (CDT)
- GNIS feature ID: 76703

Creamery Package (formerly Hitt) is an unincorporated community in Scott Township, Mississippi County, Arkansas, United States. It is north of Interstate 55, exit 36 and southeast of Dyess.
