= Rivercrest High School (Arkansas) =

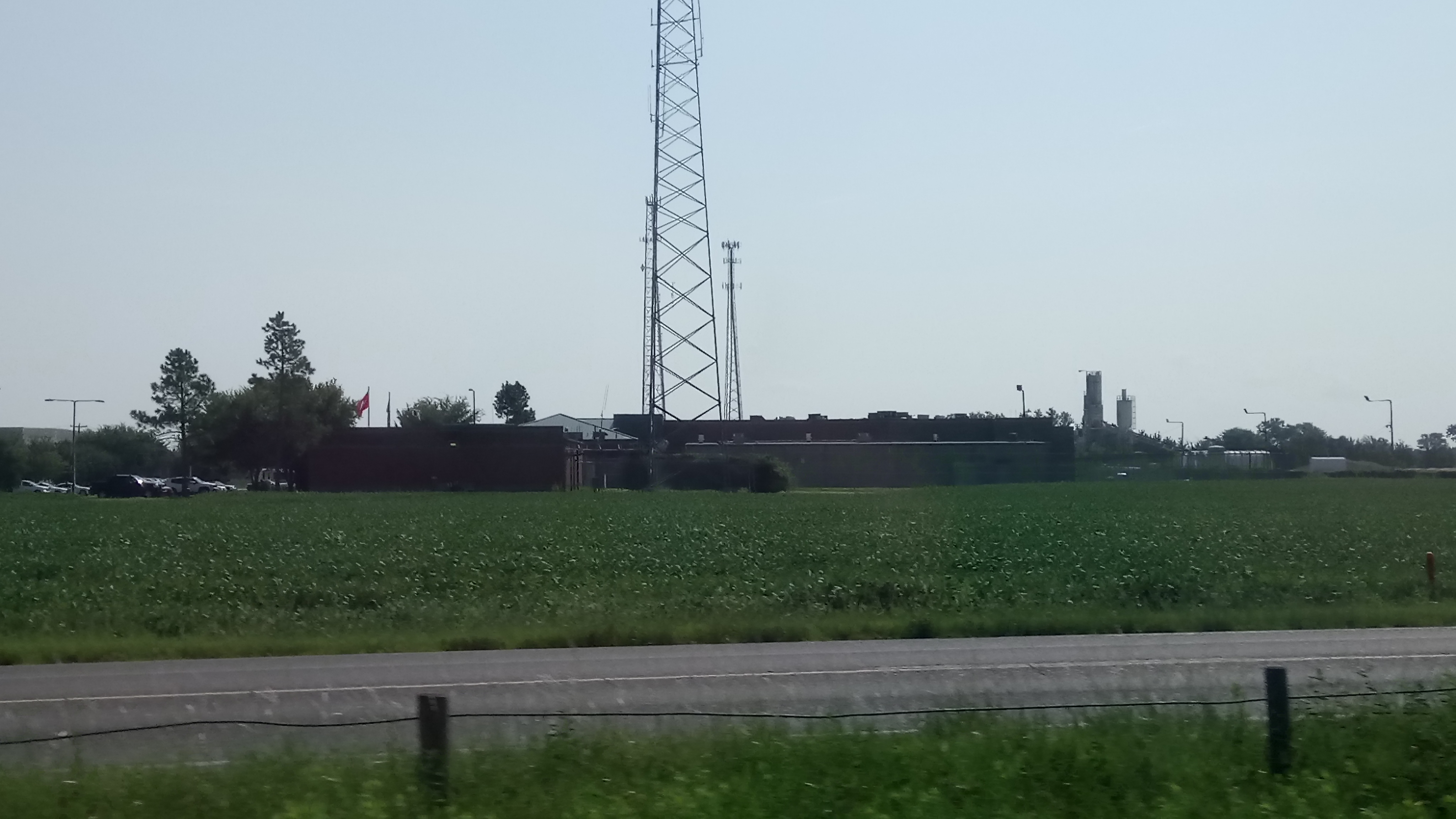

Location
- 1700 AR 14 West; Mississippi County (Marie postal address), Arkansas 72395; United States; 35°36′45″N 90°6′25″W

Information
- School type: Public comprehensive
- Status: Open
- School district: Rivercrest School District
- CEEB code: 042685
- NCES School ID: 050004501204
- Teaching staff: 51.59 (on FTE basis)
- Grades: 7–12
- Enrollment: 550 (2016–17)
  - Grade 7: 108
  - Grade 8: 102
  - Grade 9: 137
  - Grade 10: 90
  - Grade 11: 73
  - Grade 12: 93
- Student to teacher ratio: 11.69
- Education system: ADE Smart Core
- Classes offered: Regular, Advanced Placement (AP)
- Campus type: Rural
- Colors: Red and gray
- Athletics: Basketball, soccer, softball
- Athletics conference: 4A Region 3 (2018–20)
- Mascot: Colt
- Team name: Rivercrest Colts
- Accreditation: ADE
- Affiliation: Arkansas Activities Association
- Website: rivercrestcolts.org

Rivercrest High School is a comprehensive public high school located in unincorporated Mississippi County, Arkansas, United States, with a Wilson postal address. It is the only high school administered by the Rivercrest School District (formerly the Southern Mississippi County School District) and houses the district's administrative offices.

It is one of six public high schools in Mississippi County.

The school provides secondary education in grades 7 through 12 to students in the municipalities of Wilson, Bassett, Birdsong, Dyess, Joiner, Keiser, Luxora, Marie, and Victoria. It also includes a portion of Osceola and a small portion of Etowah. Additionally several unincorporated areas are on the map: Driver, and Frenchmans Bayou.

== Academics ==
The assumed course of study follows the Smart Core curriculum developed by the Arkansas Department of Education (ADE), which requires students complete at least 22 units prior to graduation. Students complete regular coursework and exams and may take Advanced Placement (AP) courses and exam with the opportunity to receive college credit. Rivercrest High School is accredited by the ADE and is accredited as a charter member of AdvancED (formerly North Central Association).

== Demographics ==
A 2011 report from the Arkansas Legislature stated that a staff member of the Osceola School District "indicated" that a few white students resident in that district may be attending the middle school section of Rivercrest High using addresses that do not reflect their true locations.

== Athletics ==
The Rivercrest High School mascot and athletic emblem is the Colt with red and gray serving as the school colors.

The Rivercrest Colts compete in interscholastic activities within the 4A Classification administered by the Arkansas Activities Association. The Warriors play within the 4A Region 3 Conference and participate in football, golf (boys/girls), cross country (boys/girls), swimming (girls only), basketball (boys/girls), cheer, and track (boys/girls).

- Football: The Rivercrest Colts football teams have won three state football championships (1985, 2010, 2017).
- Golf: The girls' golf team won its first and only state championship in 2011.
- Basketball: The boys' teams have won two state basketball championships (1990, 2011). The girls' teams have won three state championships (1974, 1978, 1980).
- Track and field: The boys' track and field teams have won three state championships (1993, 2010, 2011).

== Notable alumni ==
- Ann Clemmer (1976) – Republican member of the Arkansas House of Representatives from Saline County
- Cortez Kennedy – Former professional football player; inductee, NFL Hall of Fame
