= Driver, Arkansas =

- Unincorporated community
- Location within Arkansas Location within the United States
- Coordinates: 35°36′44″N 90°00′43″W
- Country: United States
- State: Arkansas
- County: Mississippi
- Elevation: 236 ft (72 m)
- Time zone: UTC-6 (Central (CST))
  - Summer (DST): UTC-5 (CDT)
- ZIP code: 72329
- Area code: 870
- GNIS feature ID: 57678

Driver is an unincorporated community in Mississippi County, Arkansas, United States. Driver is located at the intersection of U.S. Route 61 and Arkansas Highway 119, 3.5 miles (5.6 km) north-northeast of Wilson.

== Education ==
Residents are zoned to Rivercrest School District (formerly South Mississippi County School District). The public high school is Rivercrest High School.
