= Rivercrest School District =

School district in Arkansas, United States

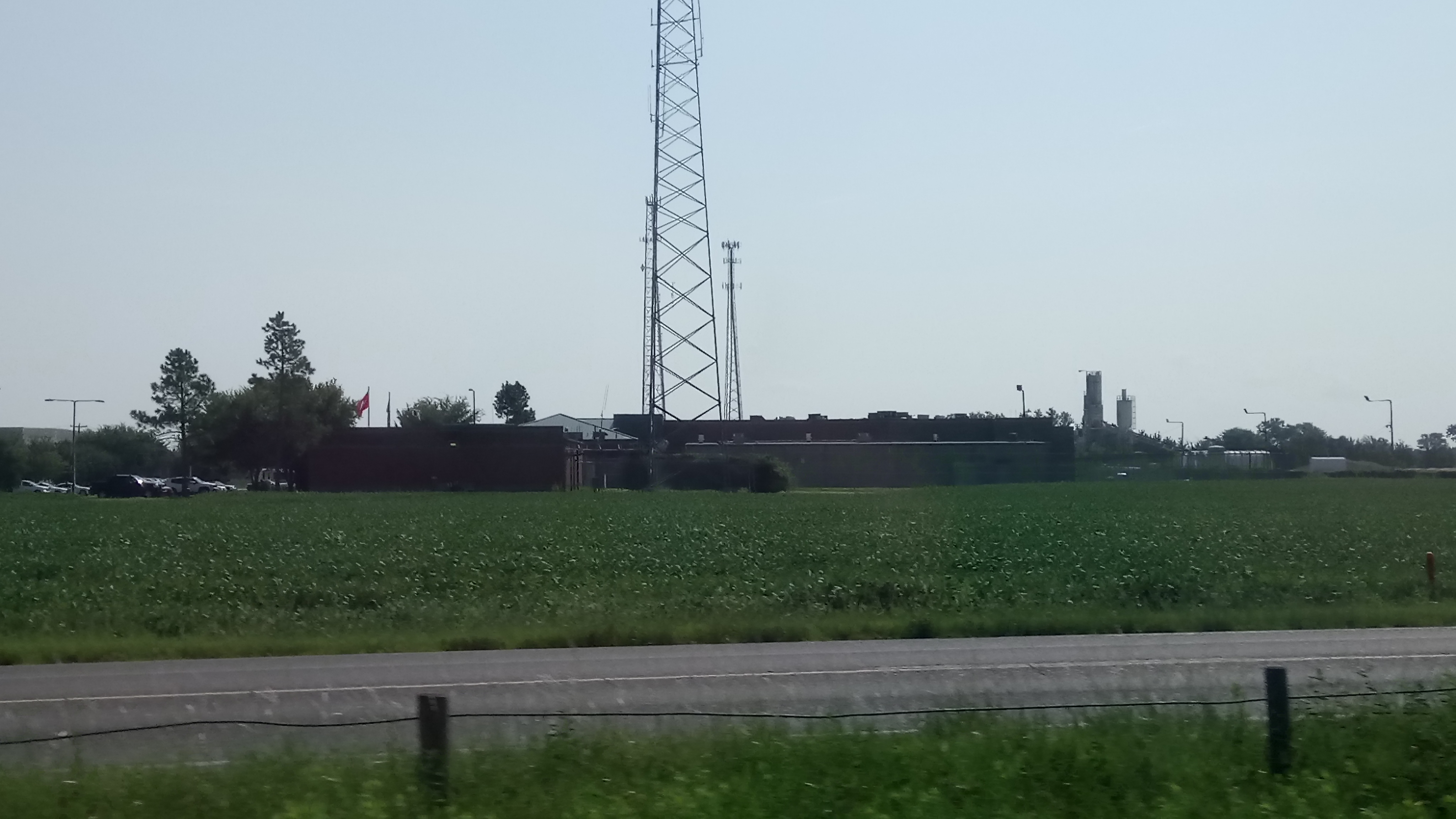
- District headquarters and Rivercrest High School

Location
- 1700 W. State Hwy 14; Mississippi County (Wilson address), AR 72395 United States

District information
- Grades: PK–12
- Established: 1968
- Superintendent: Mike Smith
- Accreditation: Arkansas Department of Education
- Schools: 4
- NCES District ID: 0500045

Students and staff
- Students: 1,364
- Teachers: 96.73 (on FTE basis)
- Staff: 223.73 (on FTE basis)
- Student–teacher ratio: 14.10
- Athletic conference: 3 AAA Region 3
- District mascot: Colt
- Colors: Red Gray

Other information
- Website: rivercrestcolts.org

Rivercrest School District, formerly Southern Mississippi County School District, is a public school district based in Rivercrest High School in unincorporated Mississippi County, Arkansas, United States, with a Wilson postal address. The school district provides early childhood, elementary and secondary education for more than 1,300 prekindergarten through grade 12 students and employs more than 220 staff (including faculty) at its two facilities. The district encompasses 363.77 square miles (942.2 km^{2}) of land in Mississippi County.

It serves the municipalities of Wilson, Bassett, Birdsong, Dyess, Joiner, Keiser, Luxora, Marie, and Victoria. It also includes a portion of Osceola and a small portion of Etowah. Additionally several unincorporated areas are on the map: Driver, and Frenchmans Bayou.

Rivercrest School District and its schools are accredited by the Arkansas Department of Education (ADE).

== History ==
It was formed in 1968 by the merger of the Dyess, Keiser, Shawnee, and Wilson school districts.

On July 1, 1986, the Luxora School District consolidated into the Southern Mississippi County School District.

== Schools ==
- Rivercrest High School —serving more than 540 students in grades 7 through 12.
- Rivercrest Elementary School -serving more than 700 Pre-Kindergarten through grade 6.

== Demographics ==
As of 2011, 64% of the students were white.
