= KTPA =

KTPA may refer to:

- The ICAO airport code for Tampa International Airport
- KTPA (AM), a defunct radio station (1370 AM) licensed to Prescott, Arkansas, United States
