= Greg Ruffin =

American football coach

Biographical details
- Education: Jackson State

Playing career
- 1993–1995: Lane
- Positions: Quarterback, fullback

Coaching career (HC unless noted)
- 1996: Jackson Cent.-Merry HS (TN) (RB)
- 1997–1998: Kemper Military (MO) (RB)
- 1999–2000: Lincoln (MO) (OC/WR)
- 2001: Benedict (OC/QB)
- 2002: Shaw
- 2004: Ouachita Baptist (def. asst.)
- 2005: Tuskegee (RB)
- 2006–2011: Jackson State (RB/RC)
- 2012: Texas Southern (TE/RC)
- 2014: Paine
- 2016: Texas College
- 2017: Bethune–Cookman (TE)
- 2018–2020: Edward Waters
- 2021: Blytheville HS (AR)
- 2022: Alabama State (RB/RC)

Head coaching record
- Overall: 7–35 (varsity); 7–3 (club); 2–8 (high school)

Gregory Ruffin is an American college football coach. He was the head football coach at Shaw University in Raleigh, North Carolina (2002), Paine College in Augusta, Georgia (2014), and Texas College in Tyler, Texas (2016) and Edward Waters College in Jacksonville, Florida (2018–2021).

Ruffin was fired from his post at Edward Waters in February 2021 after a 53–0 loss to Jackson State. Joseph Carter was appointed interim head coach. Ruffin was hired by the Blytheville School District for the Head Football Coach position at Blytheville High School in June 2021. At the end of the 2021 season, Ruffin's record with the Blytheville Chickasaws was 2-8, 2-5 in conference. Ruffin resigned from the Blytheville School District on December 30, 2021. According to the Alabama State University's Twitter, Ruffin has accepted a position to coach the running backs for the ASU Hornets.

== Head coaching record ==
=== Club ===
Year	Team	Overall	Conference	Standing	Bowl/playoffs
Shaw Bears (Club) (2002)
2002	Shaw	7–3			
Shaw:		7–3			
Total:		7–3			

=== Varsity ===
Year	Team	Overall	Conference	Standing	Bowl/playoffs
Paine Lions (Southern Intercollegiate Athletic Conference) (2014)
2014	Paine	2–8	1–6	T–5th (East)	
Paine:		2–8	1–6		
Texas College Steers (Central States Football League) (2016)
2016	Texas College	0–9	0–6	7th	
Texas College:		0–9	0–6		
Edward Waters Tigers (Mid-South Conference) (2018)
2018	Edward Waters	4–7	2–4	5th (Sun)	
Edward Waters Tigers (NAIA independent) (2019)
2019	Edward Waters	1–10			
2020–21	Edward Waters	0–1			
Edward Waters:		5–18	2–4		
Total:		7–35			

=== High school ===
Year	Team	Overall	Conference	Standing	Bowl/playoffs
Blytheville Chickasaws () (2021)
2021	Blytheville	2–8	2–5	6th	
Blytheville:		2–8	2–5		
Total:		2–8			
