= Poplar Corner, Arkansas =

- Unincorporated community
- Location within Arkansas Location within the United States
- Coordinates: 35°55′51″N 90°10′38″W
- Country: United States
- State: Arkansas
- County: Mississippi
- Elevation: 239 ft (73 m)
- Time zone: UTC-6 (Central (CST))
  - Summer (DST): UTC-5 (CDT)
- Area code: 870
- GNIS feature ID: 57162

Poplar Corner is an unincorporated community in Mississippi County, Arkansas, United States. Poplar Corner is located at the junction of Arkansas highways 77 and 119, 3 miles (4.8 km) north of Manila.
