= Arkansas Highway 119 (1927–2022) =

Former highway in Arkansas, USA

Highway 119

Route information
- Maintained by ArDOT
- Length: 3.914 mi (6.299 km)
- Existed: 1927–March 16, 2022

Major junctions
- South end: US 61 / Great River Road
- North end: Unnamed levee road

Location
- Country: United States
- State: Arkansas
- Counties: Mississippi

Highway system
- Arkansas Highway System; Interstate; US; State; Business; Spurs; Suffixed; Scenic; Heritage
← AR 118	→ AR 120

Highway 119 (AR 119, Ark. 119, and Hwy. 119) is a former state highway in Mississippi County, Arkansas. Created in 1927, the route connected a Mississippi River levee road to the state highway system until deletion in 2022. It was maintained by the Arkansas Department of Transportation (ArDOT).

== Route description ==
The route began at an access road for a Mississippi River levee at the unincorporated community of Butler and ran west to an intersection at US 61 (the Great River Road) between Rotan and Driver.

== History ==
The route first appeared on the 1927 state highway map. It was turned back to county maintenance on March 16, 2022, by the Arkansas State Highway Commission at the request of Mississippi County to expedite an economic development project (steel mill) being constructed in the area.

== Major intersections ==
The entire route was in Mississippi County.

Location	mi	km	Destinations	Notes
	0.000	0.000	US 61 / Great River Road – Osceola, Wilson	Southern terminus
Butler	3.914	6.299	Unnamed levee road	Northern terminus; northern end of state maintenance
1.000 mi = 1.609 km; 1.000 km = 0.621 mi
