= Whiquitta Tobar =

American lawyer and basketball player

- Born: Whiquitta Tobar; Blytheville, Arkansas
- Education: Alabama A&M University (B.A.); Georgetown University Law Center (J.D.)
- Occupation: Lawyer
- Known for: College Basketball; Community Service

Whiquitta "Kee" Tobar is an American lawyer, podcaster, and a former college basketball player at Alabama A&M University. In 2012, Tobar was named the Southwestern Athletic Conference Player of the Year.

== Early life and education ==
Born and raised in the Arkansas Delta, Tobar grew up in Blytheville and attended Blytheville High School. Tobar is the daughter of Frankie Hatcher and Willie Tobar, Sr. Tobar is the youngest of four children. She was raised in a trailer park with five other children. Her mother, Frankie Hatcher, worked at a restaurant to support the family. Later, Tobar's mother would have to take care of Tobar's brother, who was paralyzed while still working. In 2014, Tobar's brother, Willie Lee Tobar, died from complications related to gunshot wounds and paralysis. As a child, Tobar participated in the Head Start Program. She stated: "I came from a single-parent household, and a lot of whatever I may have accomplished came from attending Head Start. Head Start taught me an awful lot of what I needed to know early in my life." While a student at Georgetown Law, Tobar met the woman who helped establish the program, Marian Wright Edelman. Tobar graduated from Blytheville High School in 2008.

=== Community service ===
After high school, Tobar attended Alabama A&M University where she became involved in community service on campus. Tobar interned with the Madison County, Alabama Commissioner’s office, where she helped former prisoners secure jobs upon release. She also volunteered at various domestic violence shelters. Her social justice activism influenced her interest in prison reform, women's rights, and labor law and her decision to attend law school. In 2011, Tobar participated in the Fulbright-Hays Group Project Abroad for study in Africa. Tobar was also involved in Young Democrats of America. She recalled: "I began helping with the voter registration drives, making certain that as many people as possible had the necessary information to become knowledgeable voters. As a result, I became much more politically active." As a senior, Tobar was named a candidate for the 2011–12 Lowe's Senior CLASS Award. To be eligible for the award, a student-athlete must be classified an NCAA Division I senior and have notable achievements in four areas of excellence: community, classroom, character and competition.

In 2012, Tobar graduated from Alabama A&M University with a Bachelor of Arts degree in Political Science and a minor in Philosophy.

== Basketball ==
=== High school basketball ===
Tobar attended Blytheville High School where she played on the Lady Chickasaws basketball team. Arkansas Activities Association gave Tobar All-State recognition for her basketball play, in 2005, and in 2007. In 2008, Tobar was one of twelve seniors in Arkansas selected to play in the 2008 Arkansas State All-Star Basketball Game.

=== College basketball ===
After high school, Tobar played basketball at Alabama A&M University. As a junior, Tobar led the Southwestern Athletic Conference in scoring, averaging 18.1 points per game, was third in steals (2.3), fourth in free throw percentage (.755), sixth in assists (3.0) and eighth in rebounding (6.3). Tobar was named a first-team All-SWAC selection. Heading into her senior year, Tobar was the SWAC's preseason Player of the Year. Tobar also went over the 1,000-point mark for her career. At the close of her senior campaign, Tobar was named the Southwestern Athletic Conference Player of the Year. Tobar was a prospect for the Women's National Basketball Association.

=== College statistics ===
Season	Team	Games	FGM	FGA	PCT	FTM	FTA	PCT	3PM	3PA	PCT	REB	AST	STL	BL	PTS	AVG
2008–09	Alabama A&M	26	30	79	.380	49	78	.628	2	11	.182	56	29	24	3	111	4.30
2009–10	Alabama A&M	17	89	224	.397	111	142	.782	14	61	.230	102	57	44	2	303	17.8
2010–11	Alabama A&M	29	155	404	.384	182	245	.743	32	114	.281	181	87	66	5	524	18.1
2011–12	Alabama A&M	28	165	421	.392	202	253	.798	23	75	.307	174	79	52	15	555	19.8
Totals		100	439	1128	.289	544	718	.716	71	261	.272	513	252	186	25	1493	14.9

== Law ==
After graduating from college, Tobar began studies at Georgetown University Law Center where she was a Public Interest Law Scholar. After her brother was shot and paralyzed from the neck down in an incident while she was growing up in rural Arkansas, Tobar aspired to be a public defender. Tobar was on the Pro Bono Board at Georgetown Law.

After graduating from Georgetown Law, Tobar became the Zubrow Fellow in Children’s Law at the Juvenile Law Center in Philadelphia. As of February 2023, Tobar is Chief Equity and Inclusion Officer at Community Legal Services of Philadelphia. She is host of the podcast "How Is That Legal?: Breaking Down Systemic Racism One Law at a Time."
