= Sherman Mound and Village =

- U.S. National Register of Historic Places
- Location: Address restricted, vicinity of Osceola, in Mississippi County, Arkansas
- NRHP reference No.: 100002062
- Added to NRHP: February 1, 2018

The Sherman Mound and Village site in Mississippi County, Arkansas is a c.1200 archeological site which was listed on the National Register of Historic Places in 2018.

It has "components from the Prehistoric Late Woodland and Middle Mississippian periods. 'Geophysics produced evidence for the presence of all the basic architectural design elements of a Mississippian town with a mound-and-plaza complex, including: a primary mound; two secondary mounds (B and C); one or two plazas; a palisade wall with bastions; and discrete residential or habitation areas characterized by multiple geophysical features and surface artifact concentrations,' according to the National Register nomination. 'The most conspicuous remaining element of this Mississippian town is the Sherman Mound, which is one of the largest and best-preserved Middle Mississippian period earthworks in the Central Mississippi Valley.'"
