= Blytheville High School =

Location
- 600 North 10th Street; Blytheville, Mississippi County, Arkansas 72315; United States
- Coordinates: 35°55′56″N 89°54′52″W

Information
- Status: Open
- School board: Blytheville School Board
- School district: Blytheville School District
- NCES District ID: 0503320
- Oversight: Arkansas Department of Education (ADE)
- CEEB code: 040240
- NCES School ID: 050332000091
- Grades: 9–12
- Enrollment: 411 (2023-2024)
- Student to teacher ratio: 9.00
- Education system: ADE Smart Core curriculum
- Classes offered: Regular, Advanced Placement
- Campus type: Rural
- Colors: Maroon and white
- Athletics conference: 5A East (2012–14)
- Mascot: Chickasaw
- Team name: Blytheville Chickasaws
- Accreditation: AdvancED (1924–)
- Feeder schools: Blytheville Middle School
- Affiliation: Arkansas Activities Association (AAA)
- Website: www.blythevilleschools.com/o/bhs

Blytheville High School is a comprehensive public high school for students in grades nine through twelve located in Blytheville, Arkansas, United States. It is one of six public high schools in Mississippi County, Arkansas and the only high school managed by the Blytheville School District.

The school serves most of Blytheville and all of Burdette.

== History ==
In the late 1960s, Blytheville's African-American high school students had the option to transfer from the Richard B. Harrison High School to the white Blytheville High School. Several black students chose Blytheville High School to receive a college preparatory education. In 1970, a federal court judge in nearby Jonesboro ordered the total integration of Blytheville schools.

== Curriculum ==
The assumed course of study at Blytheville High School is the Smart Core curriculum developed by the Arkansas Department of Education. Students are engaged in regular and Advanced Placement (AP) coursework and exams prior to graduation, with the opportunity for qualified students to be named honor graduates based on grade point average and additional coursework above minimum requirements. Blytheville High School is a charter member and has been accredited since 1924 by AdvancED (formerly North Central Association).

== Athletics ==
Blytheville High School's mascot is the Chickasaw and the school colors are maroon and white. Blytheville High School is a member of the Arkansas Activities Association (AAA) and currently competes in the 5A East Conference, which has as its members, Batesville High, Paragould High, Beebe High, Greene County Tech High (Paragould), Forrest City High, Wynne High, and Nettleton High (Jonesboro). For 2012–14, the Blytheville participate in interscholastic competition including baseball, basketball (boys/girls), competitive cheer, competitive dance, cross country, football, golf (boys/girls), softball, tennis (boys/girls), track and field (boys/girls), and volleyball.

The girls gymnastics team won three state championships (1986, 1987, 1997).

== Notable alumni ==
- Fred Akers - former American football coach
- Monte Hodges - American politician
- Edgar H. Lloyd (ca. 1940) - World War II Medal of Honor recipient
- Whiquitta Tobar - lawyer, activist, and former college basketball player
- Michael Utley - award-winning composer, singer and longtime member of Jimmy Buffett's Coral Reefer Band and Club Trini.
- Ira T Young - Community Activist, Coach and mentor.
