= Big Lake National Wildlife Refuge =

US nature reserve

- IUCN category IV (habitat/species management area)
- Location within the United States
- Location: Mississippi County, Arkansas, United States
- Nearest city: Manila, Arkansas
- Coordinates: 35°55′N 90°07′W
- Area: 11,047 acres (44.71 km^{2}) (2014)
- Established: 1915
- Governing body: U.S. Fish and Wildlife Service
- Website: Big Lake National Wildlife Refuge

Big Lake National Wildlife Refuge is an 11,047-acre (45 km^{2}) National Wildlife Refuge located in Mississippi County, Arkansas, managed by the United States Fish and Wildlife Service. It is situated 2 miles (3.2 km) east of Manila, Arkansas, and consists mostly of a shallow lake, swamp, and bottomland hardwood forests. The preservation of habitat for waterfowl in an intensely agricultural region is the primary purpose of the refuge. 6,400 acres (20 km^{2}) of Big Lake was named a National Natural Landmark. 2,144 acres (8 km^{2}) are designated as wilderness.

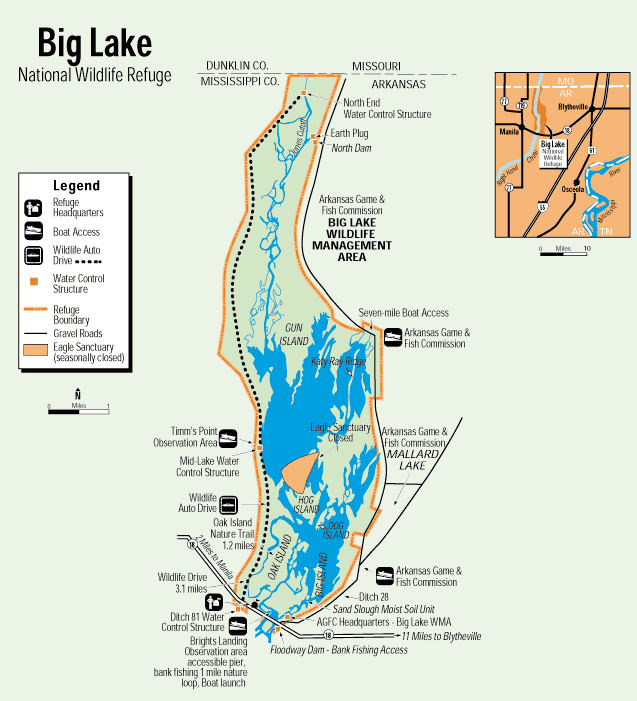
Map of Big Lake National Wildlife Refuge in Arkansas.

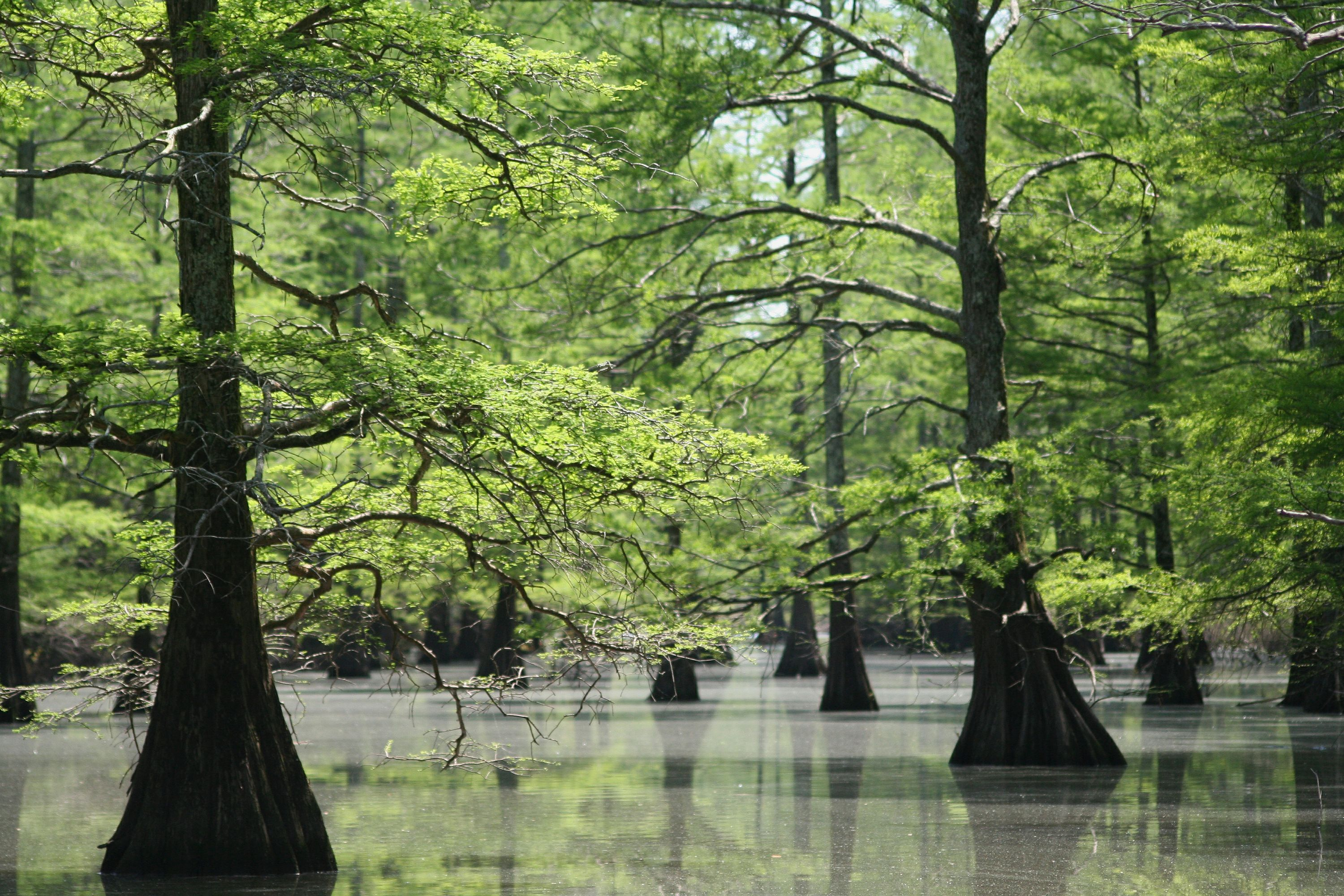
The refuge features old-growth bald cypress forests.

== History ==
Prior to the 1811–12 New Madrid earthquakes, the Little River flowed unimpeded through the flat lowlands adjacent to the Mississippi River in Arkansas and the Missouri Bootheel. The earthquake altered the drainage pattern of the region and created Big Lake. The region was known to the first White settlers as the "Great Swamp" and consisted of hardwood forests, especially bald cypress, wooded swampland, and open water.

After the American Civil War, railroads were built through the region and exploitation of the timber began. The Big Lake area was also popular with hunters because of its abundant waterfowl. Market hunters killed white-tailed deer and ducks and netted largemouth bass and crappie to sell the meat in cities, and hunting clubs acquired large tracts for sport hunting. This created problems with the local residents who depended upon hunting for subsistence. Locals, mostly poor, were shut out of land acquired by hunting clubs and timber companies. The result was the "Big Lake Wars" from the 1870s to 1915, which pitted the locals against the sportsmen and market hunters. Legal disputes as well as fights, shootings, and burnings of clubhouses resulted.

In the early twentieth century, rice cultivation was established in Arkansas and soon the region around Big Lake was crisscrossed with levees and drainage and irrigation ditches, leaving Big Lake as an island in a sea of agricultural cultivation. In 1915, with the wildlife populations seriously in decline and agricultural development increasing, the U.S. government established Big Lake National Wildlife Refuge, the third oldest inland federal wildlife refuge to be created.

The large network of man-made ditches in the Missouri bootheel region drains 2,500 square miles (6,500 km^{2}) of former swamp land. The non-natural drainage adversely affects the refuge. Silt from agricultural lands was impacting Big Lake, but in the 1990s the U.S. Army Corps of Engineers undertook to divert silt-laden water around the refuge. Water quality has improved and wildlife populations have increased as a result.

== The refuge ==
Big Lake averages only three feet (one meter) in depth. The refuge consists of 8,138 acres (21 km^{2}) of open water interspersed with wooded swampland at normal water levels. Most of the remaining land is seasonally flooded. In times of flood, 99 percent of the refuge can be under water. The lake is bordered by a virgin swamp forest of tupelo and bald cypress. The drier parts of the refuge are also forested in hardwoods, including several species of oak, green ash, cottonwood, river birch and red maple.

About 227 species of birds have been identified in the Big Lake area. The refuge hosts wintering and migrating waterfowl, with as many as 200,000 present during the winter. Wood ducks are permanent year-round residents, with about 2,500 chicks born each year. Bald eagles began to nest on the refuge in 1993. Other animals found include the river otter, beaver, raccoon, wild turkey, white-tailed deer, bobcat and occasionally armadillo. The Arkansas record largemouth bass, weighing 16 pounds 8 ounces (7.5 kg), was caught in the refuge in 1976.

The refuge is open to the public year round, although it is sometimes closed during floods.

== Adjacent conservation areas ==
Bordering the refuge on the north is the contiguous Hornersville Swamp Conservation Area, owned and managed by the Missouri Department of Conservation. It comprises 3,166 acres (12.81 km^{2}) that are also protected and managed for native wildlife. Contiguous with the refuge on the east is the Big Lake Wildlife Management Area, owned by the state of Arkansas. It comprises 12,320 acres (49.9 km^{2}) and is open for hunting deer, waterfowl, and small game. The wildlife management area consists mostly of bottomland hardwood forests. Both areas are subject to flooding.
