= Blytheville School District =

School district in Arkansas, United States

Coordinates: 35°55′55″N 89°54′27″W

Address
- 405 West Park Street Blytheville, Arkansas, 72315; United States

District information
- Type: Public
- Grades: PreK–12
- Superintendent: Jennifer Blankenship
- NCES District ID: 0503320

Students and staff
- Students: 1,750
- Teachers: 144.57
- Staff: 165.01
- Student–teacher ratio: 12.1

Other information
- Website: www.blythevilleschools.com

Blytheville School District #5 is a school district based in Blytheville, Arkansas, United States. BSD provides early childhood, elementary and secondary education to more than 2,900 students in prekindergarten through grade 12. The district employs more than 500 faculty and staff at its seven schools. The district encompasses 116.60 square miles (302.0 km^{2}) of land in Mississippi County.

The district serves most of Blytheville and all of Burdette.

== History ==
The Blytheville school district was formally created by the state of Arkansas on May 4, 1905.

The Burdette school district merged into the Blytheville district in 1971.

On May 29, 2025, The Arkansas State Board of Education announced it had voted to take over the district because of multiple achievement, certification, and governance issues, and had dissolved the school board. and the State Commissioner of Secondary and Elementary Education will act in place of the school board. Interim Superintendent Jennifer Blankenship will remain in place until the Arkansas Department of Education names a successor.

== Schools ==
Secondary education

- Blytheville High School, serving grades 9 through 12.
- Blytheville Middle School, serving grades 6 through 8.
- Blytheville Charter School & Alternative Learning Community, serving grades 7 through 12.

Early childhood and elementary education

- Blytheville Elementary School, serving grades 3 through 5.
- Blytheville Primary School, serving grades 1 and 2.
- Blytheville Kindergarten Center, serving prekindergarten and kindergarten.
