= Luxora, Arkansas =

- City
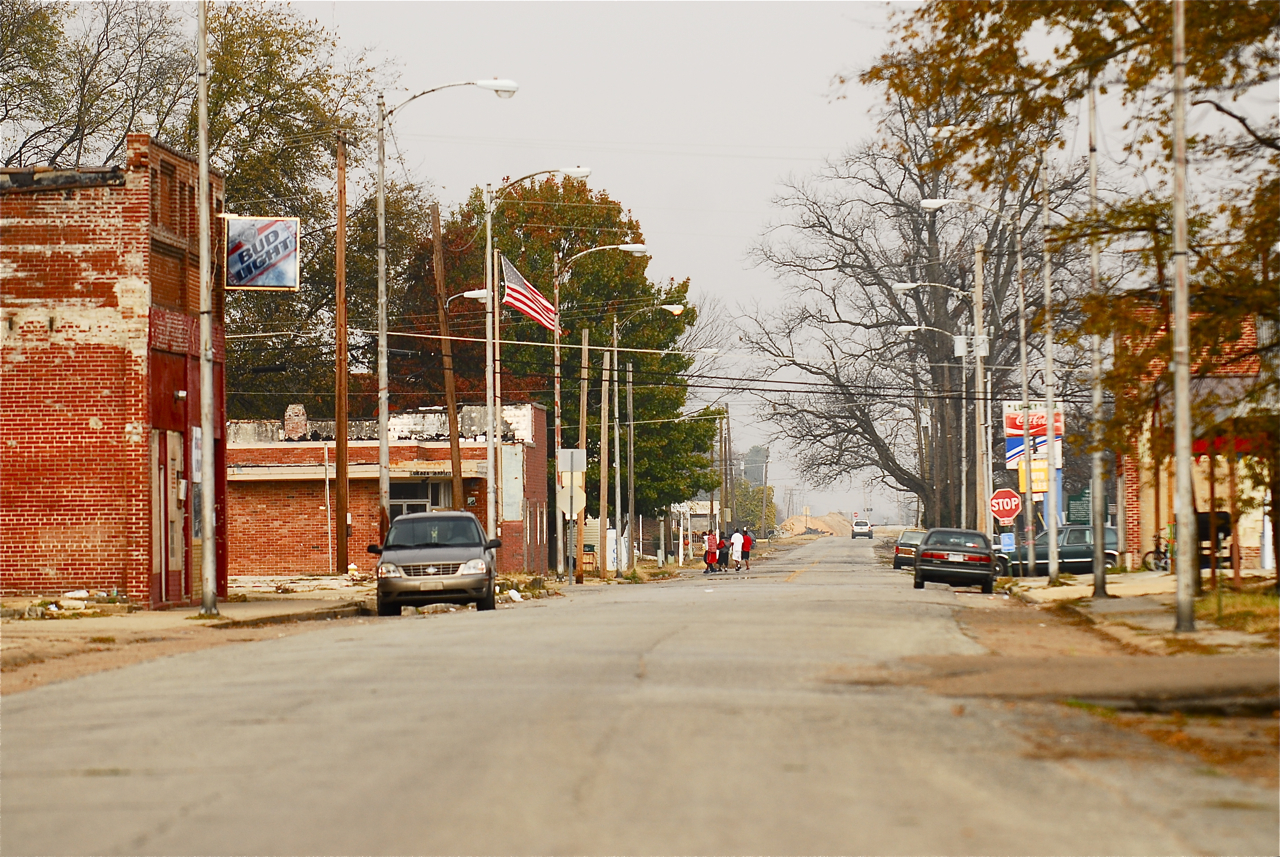

- Location in Mississippi County, Arkansas
- Coordinates: 35°45′25″N 89°55′48″W
- Country: United States
- State: Arkansas
- County: Mississippi
- Incorporated: 1897
- Named for: Luxora Waller

Area
  - Total: 0.85 sq mi (2.20 km^{2})
  - Land: 0.85 sq mi (2.20 km^{2})
  - Water: 0 sq mi (0.00 km^{2})
- Elevation: 246 ft (75 m)

Population (2020)
  - Total: 942
  - Estimate (2025): 855 ▼
  - Density: 1,107.1/sq mi (427.44/km^{2})
- Time zone: UTC-6 (Central (CST))
  - Summer (DST): UTC-5 (CDT)
- ZIP code: 72358
- Area code: 870
- FIPS code: 05-42170
- GNIS feature ID: 2404978

Luxora is a city in Mississippi County, Arkansas, United States. The population was 942 at the 2020 census, down from 1,178 in 2010.

== History ==
The city was originally settled as the community of Elmot Landing in the 1880s next to the Mississippi River. By 1897, the town had moved inland, behind the federal levee and was incorporated as Luxora, named after the daughter of a local businessman.

During World War II, the Civil Aeronautics Authority operated an intermediate landing field in the vicinity of Luxora. This field was also utilized by Air Cadets at Blytheville Army Airfield and Walnut Ridge Army Air Field during the war.

== Geography ==
Luxora is located in eastern Mississippi County, Arkansas. It is bordered to the southeast by the Tennessee state line, which follows a side channel of the Mississippi River. U.S. Route 61 passes through the northwest side of the city, leading north 14 miles (23 km) to Blytheville and southwest 5 miles (8 km) to Osceola.

According to the United States Census Bureau, the city has a total area of 0.9 square miles (2.3 km^{2}), in terms of geographical area.

== Demographics ==
Historical population
Census	Pop.	Note	%±
1900	943		—
1910	677		−28.2%
1920	1,179		74.2%
1930	1,074		−8.9%
1940	1,258		17.1%
1950	1,302		3.5%
1960	1,236		−5.1%
1970	1,566		26.7%
1980	1,739		11.0%
1990	1,338		−23.1%
2000	1,317		−1.6%
2010	1,178		−10.6%
2020	942		−20.0%
2025 (est.)	855	▼	−9.2%
U.S. Decennial Census

=== 2020 census ===
Luxora city, Arkansas – Racial and ethnic composition Note: the US Census treats Hispanic/Latino as an ethnic category. This table excludes Latinos from the racial categories and assigns them to a separate category. Hispanics/Latinos may be of any race.
Race / Ethnicity (NH = Non-Hispanic)	Pop 2000	Pop 2010	Pop 2020	% 2000	% 2010	% 2020
White alone (NH)	527	390	333	40.02%	33.11%	35.35%
Black or African American alone (NH)	738	716	533	56.04%	60.78%	56.58%
Native American or Alaska Native alone (NH)	1	6	1	0.08%	0.51%	0.11%
Asian alone (NH)	0	0	0	0.00%	0.00%	0.00%
Native Hawaiian or Pacific Islander alone (NH)	0	0	0	0.00%	0.00%	0.00%
Other race alone (NH)	2	0	0	0.15%	0.00%	0.00%
Mixed race or Multiracial (NH)	13	12	32	0.99%	1.02%	3.40%
Hispanic or Latino (any race)	36	54	43	2.73%	4.58%	4.56%
Total	1,317	1,178	942	100.00%	100.00%	100.00%

As of the 2020 United States census, there were 942 people, 358 households, and 200 families residing in the city.

=== 2010 census ===
As of the 2010 United States census, there were 1,178 people living in the town. The racial makeup of the town was 60.8% Black, 33.1% White, 0.5% Native American and 1.0% from two or more races. 4.6% were Hispanic or Latino of any race.

=== 2000 census ===
At the 2000 census, there were 1,317 people, 477 households and 352 families living in the town. The population density was 584.5/km^{2} (1,514.5/mi^{2}). There were 537 housing units at an average density of 238.3/km^{2} (617.5/mi^{2}). The racial makeup of the town was 40.93% White, 56.04% Black or African American, 0.08% Native American, 1.97% from other races, and 0.99% from two or more races. 2.73% of the population were Hispanic or Latino of any race.

There were 477 households, of which 38.6% had children under the age of 18 living with them, 43.0% were married couples living together, 26.0% had a female householder with no husband present, and 26.0% were non-families. 23.9% of all households were made up of individuals, and 11.1% had someone living alone who was 65 years of age or older. The average household size was 2.76 and the average family size was 3.29.

Age distribution was 34.8% under the age of 18, 7.6% from 18 to 24, 24.8% from 25 to 44, 21.1% from 45 to 64, and 11.7% who were 65 years of age or older. The median age was 31 years. For every 100 females, there were 87.1 males. For every 100 females age 18 and over, there were 78.2 males.

The median household income was $20,304, and the median family income was $23,906. Males had a median income of $22,375 versus $18,698 for females. The per capita income for the town was $9,060. About 30.7% of families and 32.4% of the population were below the poverty line, including 37.7% of those under age 18 and 30.3% of those age 65 or over.

== Education ==
Public education for elementary and secondary students is provided by the Rivercrest School District (formerly the Southern Mississippi County School District), which includes the Southern Mississippi County Elementary School at Luxora (prekindergarten through grade 4). Students graduate from Rivercrest High School located near Wilson.

On July 1, 1986, the Luxora School District consolidated into the Southern Mississippi County School District.
