= Dyess, Arkansas =

- Town
- Town of Dyess
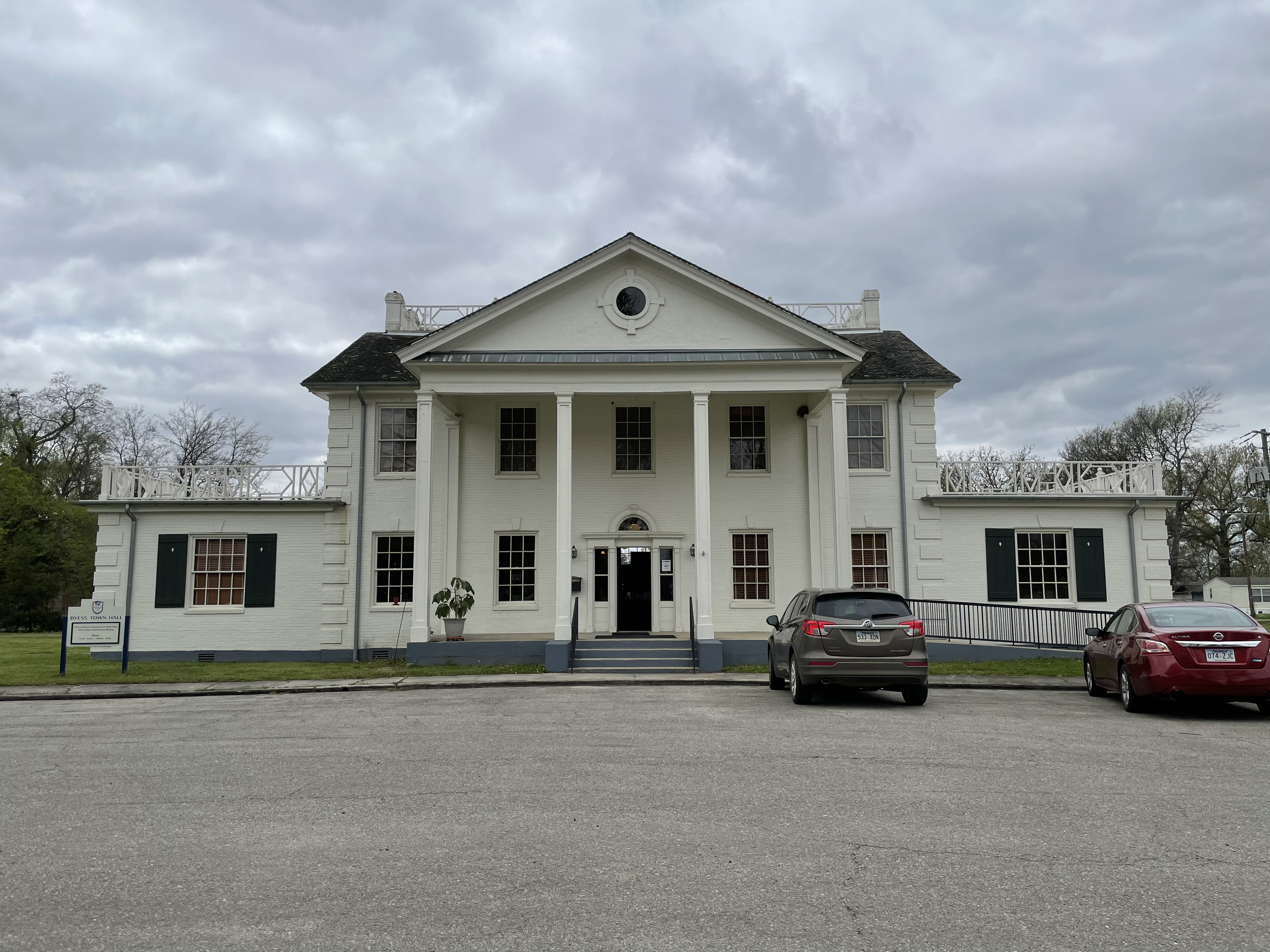
- Main façade of the Dyess Town Hall

- Location in Mississippi County and Arkansas

- Location in the United States
- Coordinates: 35°35′22″N 90°12′48″W
- Country: United States
- State: Arkansas
- County: Mississippi
- Township: Dyess
- Founded: 1934
- Incorporated: 1964
- Founder: Federal Emergency Relief Administration
- Named for: William R. Dyess

Area
  - Total: 0.96 sq mi (2.49 km^{2})
  - Land: 0.96 sq mi (2.49 km^{2})
  - Water: 0 sq mi (0.00 km^{2})
- Elevation: 223 ft (68 m)

Population (2020)
  - Total: 339
  - Estimate (2025): 318 ▼
  - Density: 352.9/sq mi (136.25/km^{2})
- Time zone: UTC-6 (Central (CST))
  - Summer (DST): UTC-5 (CDT)
- ZIP code: 72330
- Area code: 870
- FIPS code: 05-20230
- GNIS feature ID: 2406409

Dyess is a town in Mississippi County, Arkansas, which was founded as Dyess Colony in 1934 by the Federal Emergency Relief Administration as part of the Roosevelt administration's agricultural relief and rehabilitation program. It was the largest agrarian community established by the Federal Government during the Great Depression.

As of the 2020 census, the population of Dyess was 339, down from 410 in 2010. Dyess Colony was the boyhood home of country music singer Johnny Cash.

== History ==
=== Establishment ===
Dyess Colony was established in Mississippi County in 1934 as part of the New Deal efforts of Franklin D. Roosevelt to provide economic relief to destitute workers in the Great Depression. The experiment was the largest such community-building experiment established by the federal government during these years.

The project was established by Mississippi politician and cotton planter William R. Dyess (1890–1936), director of the Arkansas Emergency Relief Administration, who initially sought the establishment of a self-supporting agricultural community housing 800 families upon unused Mississippi Delta farmland. Director Dyess established the entity remembered to history as "Dyess Colony" and as "Colonization Project No. 1", plans for which were submitted to chief of the Federal Emergency Relief Administration (FERA) Harry Hopkins early in 1934. The project was approved by Hopkins in March 1934.

Some 15,144 acres (61.29 km^{2}) of unimproved land were purchased by Dyess for the colonization project at the cost of $9.05 per acre, with the parcel redeemed for the payment of unpaid back taxes in this amount. The site consisted primarily of swamp and cutover forest land, although containing deep topsoil deposited by the Mississippi River, part of what was then the most productive cotton farming county in the entire United States.

The project's scope was immediately scaled back to 500 family parcels, with the participants to be recruited from Arkansas sharecroppers and tenant farmers from across the entire state. Thousands of applicants were carefully screened, and eligibility requirements included being an experienced farmer made destitute through no fault of his own and being an Arkansas resident "of good moral background" in good health, under the age of 50, and white. Funds for the purchase of land were provided by FERA in the form of a grant to the Arkansas Emergency Relief Administration, which initially managed the project. Subsequently, a new entity was established known as Dyess Colony Inc., the stock of which was held in trust by the US Secretary of Agriculture, and management and control passed over to the managing board of that company.

The main purpose of the town's administration was to give poor white families a chance to start over with land that they could work toward owning. The original township included 500 individually owned and operated farms which were 20 or 40 acres each.

=== Early administrative structure ===
The colony was carefully planned and administered by Dyess and a board of directors, who managed the day-to-day activities of the colonists. A turnover of this top leadership took place on January 14, 1936, however, when Dyess and his top lieutenant, chief accountant and finance director Robert H. McNair Jr., were killed in an airplane crash returning to Arkansas from Washington, DC.

After his death, leadership of the Dyess Colony passed to Little Rock attorney and Arkansas Department of Labor statistician Floyd Sharp, a personal friend of Dyess, and Lawrence Westbrook, a Texas rancher who had been recruited by Harry Hopkins to work at FERA. Westbrook was fired by Hopkins in 1937 for a highly absentee work ethic and for attempting to imperially micromanage the colony's affairs from his desk in Washington.

Two cooperative associations were incorporated by the board of directors of Dyess Colony Inc. — a consumer cooperative which operated a colony store and other businesses and a producer cooperative which coordinated the processing and sale of cotton farmed by residents of the colony. The colony also launched its own cooperative credit union not later than 1938.

=== Dissolution ===
The Dyess Colony gained a powerful opponent in the form of Governor Carl E. Bailey, a rival and political opponent of Floyd Sharp. It was the governor and his allies who persuaded the directors of Dyess Colony Inc. to incorporate under Arkansas rather than Delaware law—an action which later made the colony vulnerable to punitive bureaucratic attack. Multiple attempts were made in the Arkansas legislature to undermine and disestablish the Dyess colony, an effort culminating on March 10, 1939, when the Arkansas Corporation Commission, serving at Gov. Bailey's pleasure, revoked the Dyess charter for failing to file reports for three years and failing to pay an $11 annual corporation fee.

In an effort to avoid additional capricious action, a new legal entity called the Dyess Rural Rehabilitation Corporation (DRRC) was established, to which Dyess Colony Inc. sold its assets. This succeeded in saving the non-profit colony until the DRRC was absorbed by the Farm Security Administration (FSA) in 1944. The federal aspect of the project was formally terminated in 1951.

== Geography ==
Dyess is located in southwestern Mississippi County at 35°35′25″N 90°12′52″W (35.590224, -90.214523). It is 19 miles (31 km) southwest of Osceola, the county seat.

According to the United States Census Bureau, the town has a total area of 0.96 square miles (2.49 km^{2}), all land.

== Demographics ==
Historical population
Census	Pop.	Note	%±
1970	433		—
1980	446		3.0%
1990	466		4.5%
2000	515		10.5%
2010	410		−20.4%
2020	339		−17.3%
2025 (est.)	318	▼	−6.2%
U.S. Decennial Census

As of the 2010 United States census, there were 410 people living in the town. The racial makeup of the town was 83.2% White, 1.2% Black and 2.0% from two or more races. 13.7% were Hispanic or Latino of any race.

According to the census of 2000, there were 515 people, 177 households, and 138 families living in the town. The population density was 205.0 people/km^{2} (531 people/mi^{2}). There were 204 housing units at an average density of 81.2 units/km^{2} (210 units/mi^{2}). The ethnic makeup of the town was 90.10% White, 2.14% Black or African American, 0.19% Native American, 0.19% Asian, 6.99% from other races, and 0.39% from two or more races. 9.51% of the population were Hispanic or Latino of any race.

There were 177 households, of which 49.7% had children under the age of 18 living with them, 62.1% were married couples living together, 13.0% had a female householder with no husband present, and 21.5% were non-families. 19.8% of all households were made up of individuals, and 9.6% had someone living alone who was 65 years of age or older. The average household size was 2.91 and the average family size was 3.36.

In the town, the population was spread out, with 31.5% under the age of 18, 9.7% from 18 to 24, 34.8% from 25 to 44, 15.3% from 45 to 64, and 8.7% who were 65 years of age or older. The median age was 29 years. For every 100 females, there were 91.4 males. For every 100 females age 18 and over, there were 86.8 males.

The median income for a household in the town was $25,000, and the median income for a family was $26,447. Males had a median income of $22,500 versus $18,229 for females. The per capita income for the town was $11,047. About 25.3% of families and 25.1% of the population were below the poverty line, including 26.6% of those under age 18 and 37.7% of those age 65 or over.

== Education ==
Public education for elementary and secondary students is provided by the Rivercrest School District (formerly the Southern Mississippi County School District). Students graduate from Rivercrest High School located near Wilson. The Dyess school district merged into the South Mississippi district in 1968.

== Notable people ==
Dyess is the hometown of iconic country singer-songwriter Johnny Cash, who grew up in the area from the age of three. His boyhood home is listed on the National Register of Historic Places, along with various surviving buildings from the colony period.

== Gallery ==
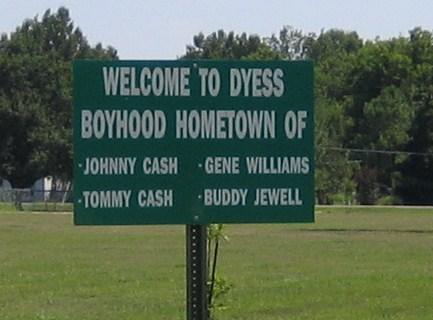
Border sign

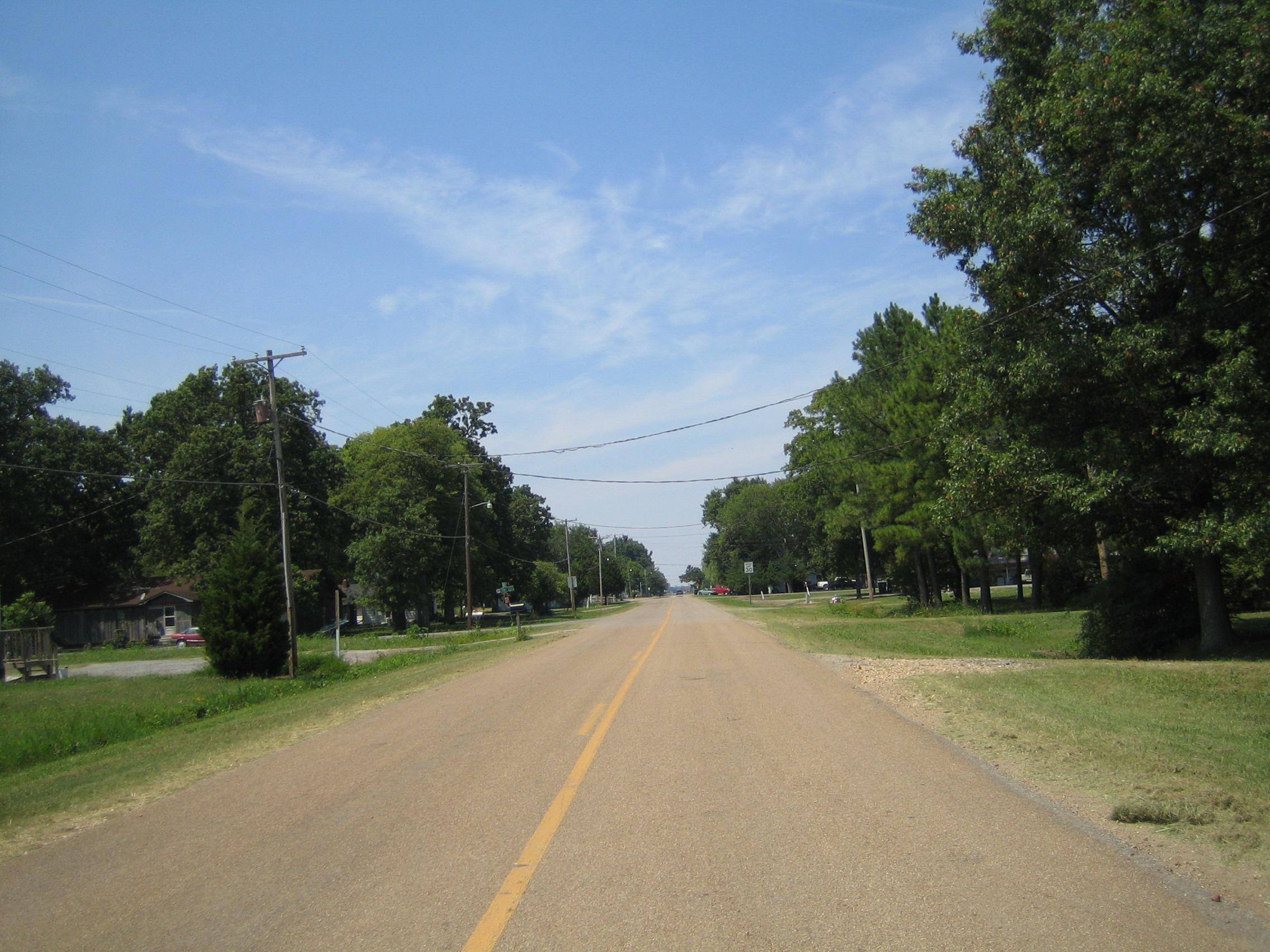
Main Street

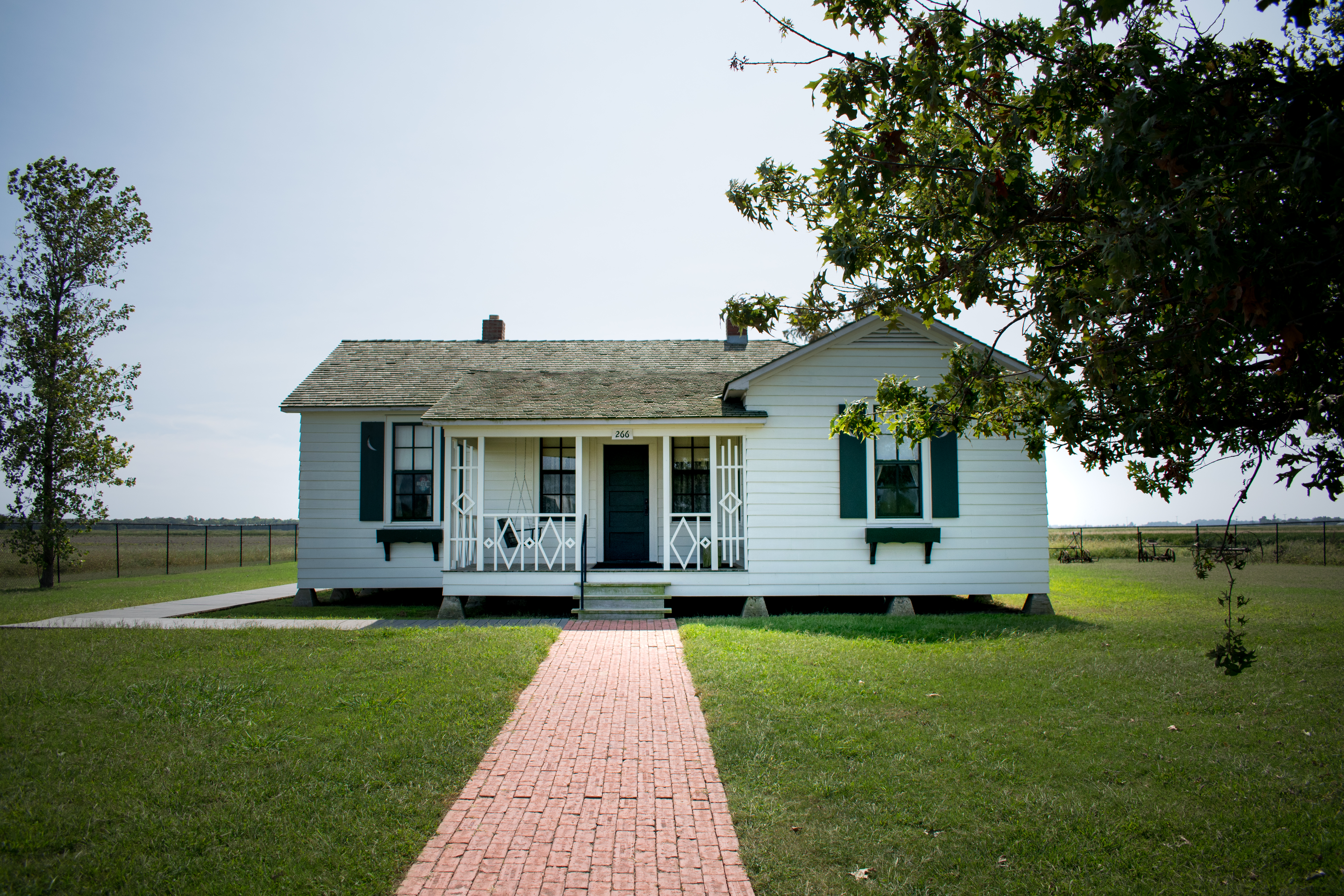
Johnny Cash Boyhood Home

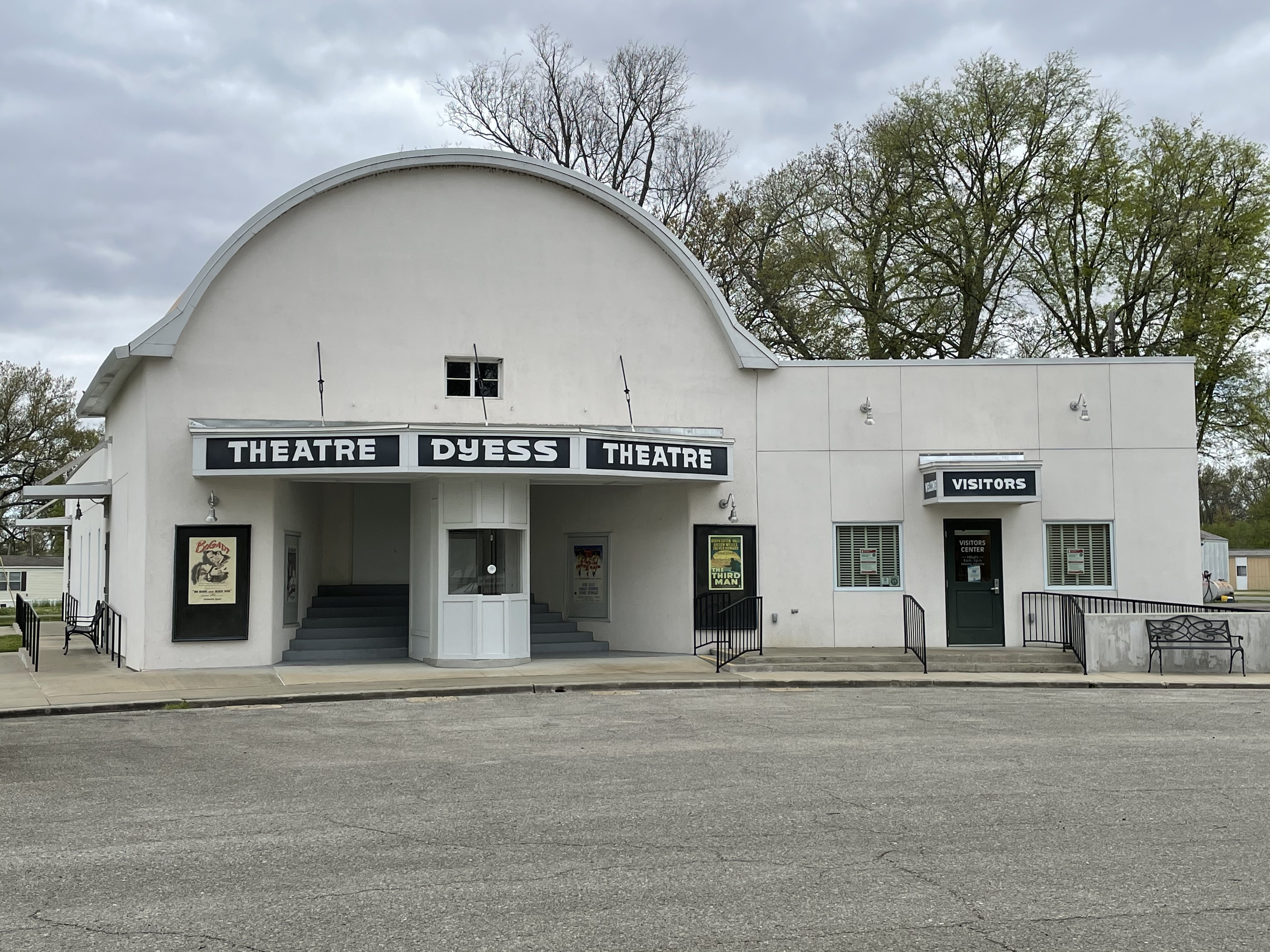
The Dyess Theatre

== See also ==
- Matanuska Valley Colony, a similar experiment in Alaska
- National Register of Historic Places listings in Mississippi County, Arkansas
