= Victoria, Arkansas =

- Town
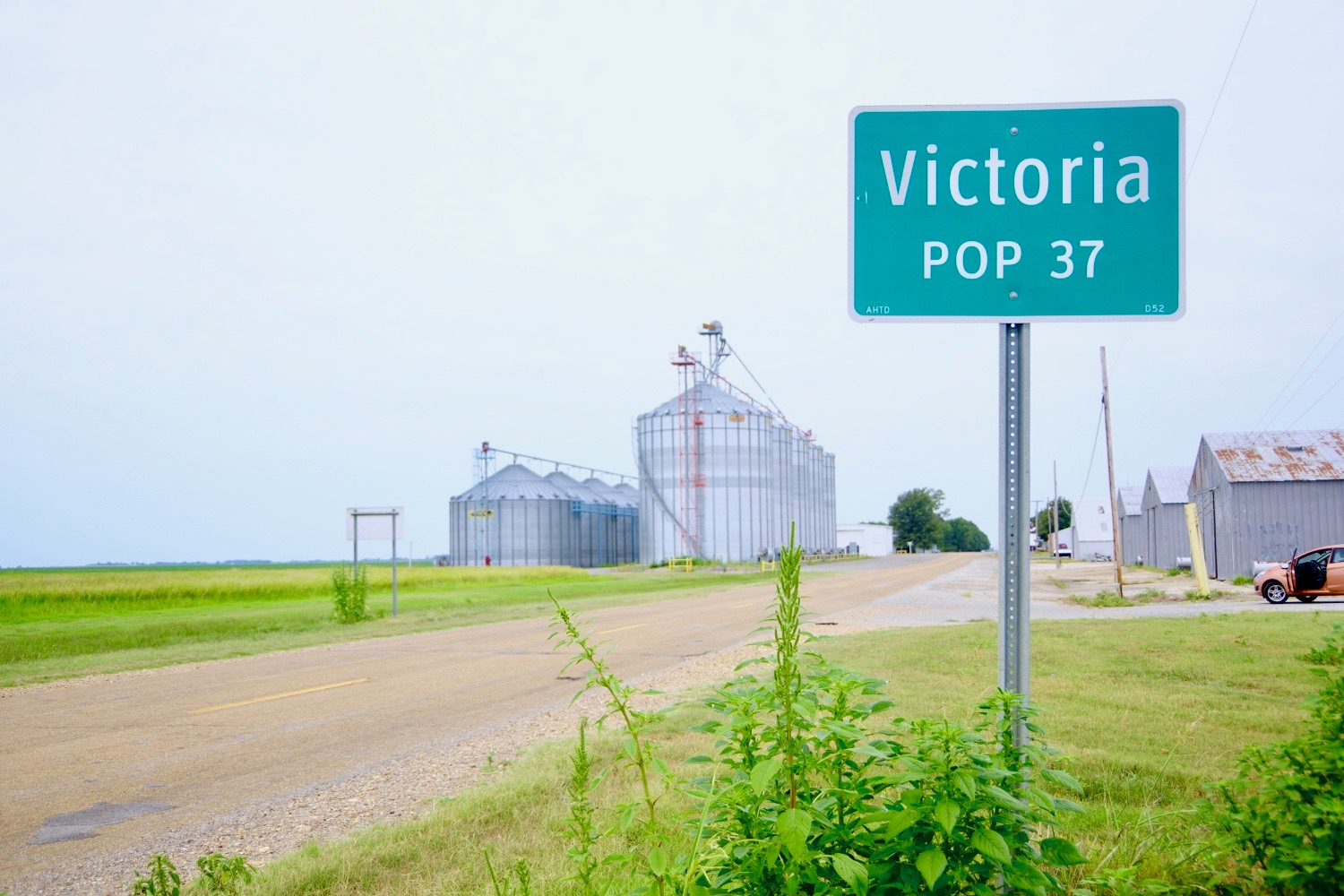
- Sign along AR 158 with 2010 population

- Location in Mississippi County, Arkansas
- Coordinates: 35°45′27″N 90°03′37″W
- Country: United States
- State: Arkansas
- County: Mississippi

Area
  - Total: 0.32 sq mi (0.82 km^{2})
  - Land: 0.32 sq mi (0.82 km^{2})
  - Water: 0 sq mi (0.00 km^{2})
- Elevation: 230 ft (70 m)

Population (2020)
  - Total: 20
  - Estimate (2025): 17 ▼
  - Density: 63.3/sq mi (24.45/km^{2})
- Time zone: UTC-6 (Central (CST))
  - Summer (DST): UTC-5 (CDT)
- FIPS code: 05-71900
- GNIS feature ID: 2406798

Victoria is a town in Mississippi County, Arkansas, United States. The population was 20 as of the 2020 census, down from 37 in 2010. It is named after a sister of the town's founder, Robert E. Lee Wilson.

== History ==
Robert E. Lee Wilson, a prominent late-19th century planter, established several small towns in Arkansas. These include Armorel, Marie, and Wilson - all of which are also in Mississippi County - as well as Victoria itself, which was named after his sister. Wilson's daughter, also named Victoria, married Frank Wesson (an heir of the firearms manufacturer), and the company they established, now known as "Wesson Farms", still operates much of the land around Victoria. The town incorporated in 1966 and reported a population of nearly 200 four years later, but it has gradually declined since.

== Geography ==
Victoria is located in central Mississippi County and lies along State Highway 158, 8 miles (13 km) northwest of Osceola, the county seat. State Highway 181 passes just to the west, and Interstate 55 passes 2.5 miles (4.0 km) to the east, with access from Exit 53.

According to the United States Census Bureau, the town has a total area of 0.32 square miles (0.83 km^{2}), all land.

== Demographics ==
Historical population
Census	Pop.	Note	%±
1970	198		—
1980	175		−11.6%
1990	110		−37.1%
2000	59		−46.4%
2010	37		−37.3%
2020	20		−45.9%
2025 (est.)	17	▼	−15.0%
U.S. Decennial Census

As of the 2010 United States census, there were 37 people living in the town. 94.6% were White Non-Hispanic, and 5.4% were Hispanic or Latino of any race.

As of the 2000 census, there were 59 people, 21 households, and 14 families living in the town. The population density was 73.5/km^{2} (191.7/mi^{2}). There were 30 housing units at an average density of 37.4/km^{2} (97.5/mi^{2}). The racial makeup of the town was 98.31% White, and 1.69% other races, such as Hispanic or Latino.

There were 21 households, out of which 28.6% had children under the age of 18 living with them, 57.1% were married couples living together, and 33.3% were non-families. 23.8% of all households were made up of individuals, and 4.8% had someone living alone who was 65 years of age or older. The average household size was 2.81 and the average family size was 3.50.

In the town, the population was spread out, with 33.9% under the age of 18, 10.2% from 18 to 24, 22.0% from 25 to 44, 28.8% from 45 to 64, and 5.1% who were 65 years of age or older. The median age was 30 years. For every 100 females, there were 126.9 males. For every 100 females age 18 and over, there were 129.4 males.

The median income for a household in the town was $28,750, and the median income for a family was roughly the same. Males had a median income of $19,500, versus $11,667 for females. The per capita income for the town was $8,721. None of the families and only 5.3% of the population were living below the poverty line, including no individuals under eighteen and none over 64.

== Education ==
Public education for elementary and secondary students is provided by the Southern Mississippi County School District. Students graduate from Rivercrest High School located in nearby Wilson.
