= Arkansas Highway 120 =

State highway in Mississippi County, Arkansas

Highway 120

Route information
- Maintained by ArDOT
- Length: 8.03 mi (12.92 km)
- Existed: c. April 1, 1926-1927–present

Major junctions
- West end: US 61 in Tuckertown
- East end: CR 903 at O'Donnell Bend

Location
- Country: United States
- State: Arkansas
- Counties: Mississippi

Highway system
- Arkansas Highway System; Interstate; US; State; Business; Spurs; Suffixed; Scenic; Heritage
← AR 119	→ AR 121

Highway 120 (AR 120, Ark. 120, and Hwy. 120) is an east–west state highway in Mississippi County, Arkansas. The route begins at US Highway 61 (US 61) and the Great River Road at Tuckertown and runs 8.03 miles (12.92 km) east to CR 903 at O'Donnell Bend at a levee along the Mississippi River. The route is maintained by the Arkansas Department of Transportation (ArDOT).

== Route description ==
Highway 120 begins at US 61 in eastern Mississippi County within the Arkansas Delta. The route runs east before turning north to Double Bridges, when it turns east and runs as a section line road. Highway 120 crosses Bear Bayou before terminating at County Road 903, which runs along a levee for the Canadian Reach of the Mississippi River.

== History ==
The highway was created after the original 1926 Arkansas state highway numbering, first appearing on the 1927 highway map.

== Major intersections ==
The entire route is in Mississippi County.

Location	mi	km	Destinations	Notes
Tuckertown	0.00	0.00	US 61 / Great River Road – Osceola	Western terminus
O'Donnell Bend	8.03	12.92	CR 903	Eastern terminus
1.000 mi = 1.609 km; 1.000 km = 0.621 mi
