= KHPA =

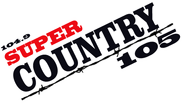
- Hope, Arkansas; United States
- Frequency: 104.9 MHz

Ownership
- Owner: Newport Broadcasting Company
- Sister stations: KXAR

History
- First air date: 1977
- Last air date: 2024
- Call sign meaning: Hope, Arkansas

Technical information
- Facility ID: 48740
- Class: A
- ERP: 6,000 watts
- HAAT: 100 meters (330 ft)
- Transmitter coordinates: 33°43′12″N 93°29′12″W

KHPA (104.9 FM) was a radio station that last aired a country music format licensed to Hope, Arkansas. The station was last owned by Newport Broadcasting Company.
