= KOSE-FM =

- Osceola, Arkansas; United States
- Broadcast area: Mississippi County, Arkansas; Lauderdale County, Tennessee; Tipton County, Tennessee
- Frequency: 107.3 MHz
- Branding: 107.3 The Goat

Programming
- Format: Oldies

Ownership
- Owner: Bobby Caldwell; (Bobby D. Caldwell Revocable Trust)
- Sister stations: KAMJ, KHLS, KNBY, KOKR, KOSE

History
- Former call signs: KAFW (1993–1994); KOSE-FM (1994–2000); KQDD (2000–2009); KQMJ (2009); KQXF (2009–2024)

Technical information
- Licensing authority: FCC
- Facility ID: 52904
- Class: A
- Power: 1,600 watts
- HAAT: 102 meters (335 ft)
- Transmitter coordinates: 35°45′59″N 89°55′44″W

Links
- Public license information: Public file; LMS

KOSE-FM (107.3 FM) is an oldies fornat broadcast radio station licensed to serve the community of Osceola, Arkansas, and broadcasting to Mississippi County in Arkansas and Lauderdale and Tipton counties in Tennessee. KOSE-FM is owned and operated by Bobby Caldwell's East Arkansas Broadcasters, through licensee Bobby D. Caldwell Revocable Trust.

As KQXF, the station was originally a contemporary hit radio station branded as "107.3 The Fix". On April 11, 2020, KQXF changed its format to oldies and rebranded as "107.3 The Goat".

Former logo as "107.3 The Fix" (2009–2020)

On January 9, 2024, the station changed its call sign to KOSE-FM.
