= KOSE (AM) =

- Wilson, Arkansas; United States
- Broadcast area: Osceola, Arkansas
- Frequency: 860 kHz
- Branding: Classic Country AM860 KOSE

Programming
- Format: Gospel and classic country
- Affiliations: Arkansas Radio Network

Ownership
- Owner: Bobby Caldwell; (Bobby D. Caldwell Revocable Trust)
- Sister stations: KAMJ, KHLS, KNBY, KOKR, KOSE-FM

History
- Call sign meaning: Osceola, former community of license

Technical information
- Licensing authority: FCC
- Facility ID: 52902
- Class: D
- Power: 1,000 watts (day); 21 watts (night)
- Transmitter coordinates: 35°41′3.3″N 89°58′57.3″W

Links
- Public license information: Public file; LMS

KOSE (860 AM) is a southern gospel and classic country formatted radio station licensed to Wilson, Arkansas, United States, and serving Mississippi County, Arkansas, and Lauderdale and Tipton counties in Tennessee. KOSE is owned and operated by Bobby Caldwell's East Arkansas Broadcasters, through licensee Bobby D. Caldwell Revocable Trust.
