= KNBY =

- Newport, Arkansas; United States
- Broadcast area: Searcy, Arkansas; Batesville, Arkansas
- Frequency: 1280 kHz
- Branding: AM 1280 Gold Oldies

Programming
- Format: Oldies

Ownership
- Owner: Bobby Caldwell; (Bobby D. Caldwell Revocable Trust)
- Sister stations: KAMJ, KHLS, KOKR, KOSE, KOSE-FM

History
- Call sign meaning: Newport Broadcasting Company (previous owner)

Technical information
- Licensing authority: FCC
- Facility ID: 48750
- Class: D
- Power: 1,000 watts (day); 88 watts (night)
- Transmitter coordinates: 35°36′38″N 91°15′2″W

Links
- Public license information: Public file; LMS

KNBY (1280 AM) is a radio station airing an Oldies format licensed to Newport, Arkansas, United States The station serves the areas of Newport, Searcy, and Batesville, and is owned by Bobby Caldwell's East Arkansas Broadcasters, through licensee Bobby D. Caldwell Revocable Trust.
