= KXAR =

- Hope, Arkansas; United States
- Frequency: 1490 kHz
- Branding: AM 1490 Classic Hits

Programming
- Format: Defunct (was Classic hits)

Ownership
- Owner: Newport Broadcasting Company
- Sister stations: KHPA

History
- First air date: December 12, 1947
- Last air date: June 20, 2024; (76 years, 191 days)

Technical information
- Licensing authority: FCC
- Facility ID: 33763
- Class: C
- Power: 700 watts unlimited
- Transmitter coordinates: 33°41′20.9″N 93°35′55.5″W

Links
- Public license information: Public file; LMS

KXAR (1490 AM, "KXAR 1490AM Classic Hits") was a radio station broadcasting a classic hits format. Licensed to Hope, Arkansas, United States, the station was owned by Newport Broadcasting Company.

== History ==
KXAR's logo under its previous talk format

KXAR began broadcasting December 12, 1947, as a Mutual affiliate on 1490 kHz with 250 watts power. It was owned by the Hope Broadcasting Company.

The Federal Communications Commission cancelled the station’s license on June 20, 2024.
