= KOKR =

Coordinates: 35°29′16″N 91°26′13″W

- Newport, Arkansas; United States
- Broadcast area: Searcy, Arkansas; Batesville, Arkansas
- Frequency: 96.7 MHz
- Branding: River Country 96.7

Programming
- Format: Country music
- Affiliations: ABC News Radio

Ownership
- Owner: Bobby Caldwell; (Bobby D. Caldwell Revocable Trust)
- Sister stations: KAMJ, KHLS, KNBY, KOSE, KOSE-FM

History
- First air date: 1967
- Former call signs: KNBY-FM (1967–1974)
- Former frequencies: 105.5 MHz (1967–1991); 100.7 MHz (1991–1992)

Technical information
- Licensing authority: FCC
- Facility ID: 48743
- Class: C2
- ERP: 40,000 watts
- HAAT: 167 meters (548 ft)

Links
- Public license information: Public file; LMS
- Website: http://rivercountry967.com/

KOKR (96.7 FM) is a radio station licensed to Newport, Arkansas. The station broadcasts a country music format and is owned by Bobby Caldwell's East Arkansas Broadcasters, through licensee Bobby D. Caldwell Revocable Trust.
