= Marie, Arkansas =

- Town
- Location in Mississippi County, Arkansas
- Coordinates: 35°36′47″N 90°04′59″W
- Country: United States
- State: Arkansas
- County: Mississippi

Area
  - Total: 0.15 sq mi (0.38 km^{2})
  - Land: 0.15 sq mi (0.38 km^{2})
  - Water: 0 sq mi (0.00 km^{2})
- Elevation: 236 ft (72 m)

Population (2020)
  - Total: 108
  - Estimate (2025): 96 ▼
  - Density: 734.9/sq mi (283.76/km^{2})
- Time zone: UTC-6 (Central (CST))
  - Summer (DST): UTC-5 (CDT)
- FIPS code: 05-44150
- GNIS feature ID: 2406095

Marie is a town in Mississippi County, Arkansas, United States. It was founded by the R.E.L. Wilson cotton company. The population was 108 at the 2020 census.

== Geography ==
Marie is located in southern Mississippi County 12 miles (19 km) southwest of Osceola, the county seat, and 4 miles (6 km) northwest of Wilson. Arkansas Highway 14 passes through the town, leading southeast to Wilson and west 1.5 miles (2.4 km) to Interstate 55 at Exit 41.

According to the United States Census Bureau, the town has a total area of 0.15 square miles (0.39 km^{2}), all land.

== Demographics ==
Historical population
| Census | Pop. | Note | %± |
|---|---|---|---|
| 1970 | 72 | | — |
| 1980 | 287 | | 298.6% |
| 1990 | 129 | | −55.1% |
| 2000 | 108 | | −16.3% |
| 2010 | 84 | | −22.2% |
| 2020 | 108 | | 28.6% |
| 2025 (est.) | 96 | ▼ | −11.1% |
U.S. Decennial Census

As of the 2010 United States census, there were 84 people living in the town. The racial makeup of the town was 78.6% White, 15.5% Black and 3.6% from two or more races. 2.4% were Hispanic or Latino of any race.

As of the census of 2000, there were 108 people, 34 households, and 26 families living in the town. The population density was 278.0 people/km^{2} (720 people/mi^{2}). There were 39 housing units at an average density of 100.4 units/km^{2} (260 units/mi^{2}). The racial makeup of the town was 69.44% White, 29.63% Black or African American, and 0.93% from two or more races.

There were 34 households, out of which 47.1% had children under the age of 18 living with them, 52.9% were married couples living together, 26.5% had a female householder with no husband present, and 20.6% were non-families. 14.7% of all households were made up of individuals, and 5.9% had someone living alone who was 65 years of age or older. The average household size was 3.18 and the average family size was 3.59.

In the town, the population was spread out, with 35.2% under the age of 18, 6.5% from 18 to 24, 28.7% from 25 to 44, 22.2% from 45 to 64, and 7.4% who were 65 years of age or older. The median age was 28 years. For every 100 females, there were 96.4 males. For every 100 females age 18 and over, there were 79.5 males.

The median income for a household in the town was $38,333, and the median income for a family was $38,333. Males had a median income of $40,313 versus $16,750 for females. The per capita income for the town was $12,686. There were 21.9% of families and 19.8% of the population living below the poverty line, including 34.4% of under eighteens and none of those over 64.

== See also ==
- Armorel, Arkansas: company town founded by R.E.L. Wilson
- Victoria, Arkansas: company town founded by R.E.L. Wilson
- Wilson, Arkansas: company town founded by R.E.L. Wilson
