= KHLS =

- Blytheville, Arkansas; United States
- Broadcast area: Blytheville, Arkansas; Dyersburg, Tennessee; Covington, Tennessee; Kennett, Missouri
- Frequency: 96.3 MHz
- Branding: Cash Country 96.3

Programming
- Format: Country music

Ownership
- Owner: Bobby Caldwell; (Bobby D. Caldwell Revocable Trust)
- Sister stations: KAMJ, KNBY, KOKR, KOSE, KOSE-FM

History
- Former call signs: KLCN-FM (1948–1973)
- Former frequencies: 96.1 MHz (1948–1985)
- Call sign meaning: "Happy Listening Station"

Technical information
- Licensing authority: FCC
- Facility ID: 63607
- Class: C1
- ERP: 100,000 watts
- HAAT: 132 meters (433 ft)
- Transmitter coordinates: 35°53′56.4″N 89°52′48.4″W

Links
- Public license information: Public file; LMS
- Website: thundercountry963.com

KHLS (96.3 FM) is a radio station airing a country music format licensed to Blytheville, Arkansas. The station serves the areas of Blytheville, Arkansas, Dyersburg, Tennessee, Covington, Tennessee, and Kennett, Missouri, and is owned by Bobby Caldwell's East Arkansas Broadcasters, through licensee Bobby D. Caldwell Revocable Trust.

KHLS is the home of Blytheville Chickasaw Football and Arkansas Razorbacks Football.
