= KAMJ =

- Gosnell, Arkansas; United States
- Broadcast area: Blytheville, Arkansas
- Frequency: 93.9 MHz
- Branding: K-JAM 93-9

Programming
- Format: Mainstream Urban

Ownership
- Owner: Bobby Caldwell; (Bobby D. Caldwell Revocable Trust)
- Sister stations: KHLS, KNBY, KOKR, KOSE, KOSE-FM

Technical information
- Licensing authority: FCC
- Facility ID: 24666
- Class: A
- ERP: 1,000 watts
- HAAT: 149.0 meters
- Transmitter coordinates: 35°53′56.4″N 89°52′48.4″W

Links
- Public license information: Public file; LMS

KAMJ (93.9 FM) is a radio station licensed to Gosnell, Arkansas, United States. The station is owned by Bobby Caldwell's East Arkansas Broadcasters, through licensee Bobby D. Caldwell Revocable Trust.
