= Mississippi County, Arkansas =

County in Arkansas, United States

- County
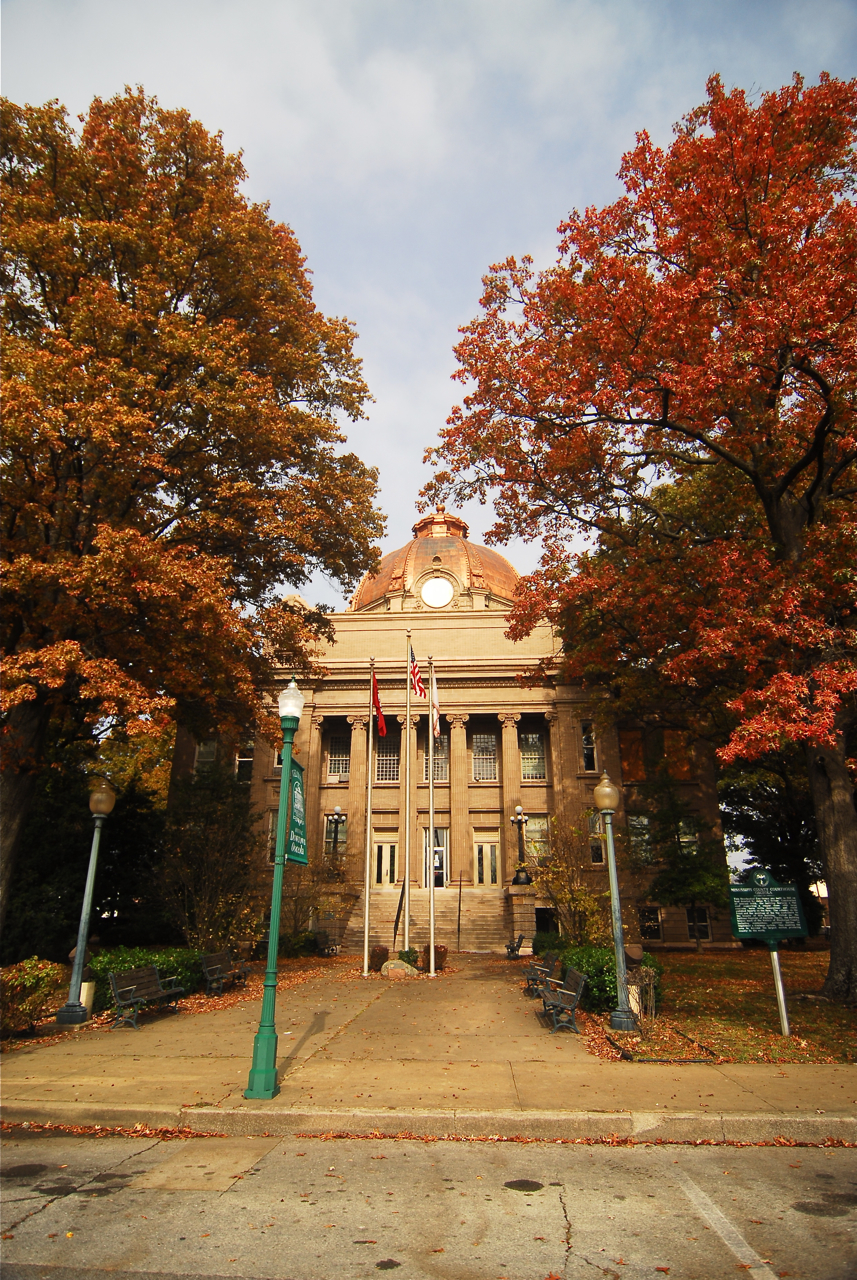
- Mississippi County Courthouse, Osceola

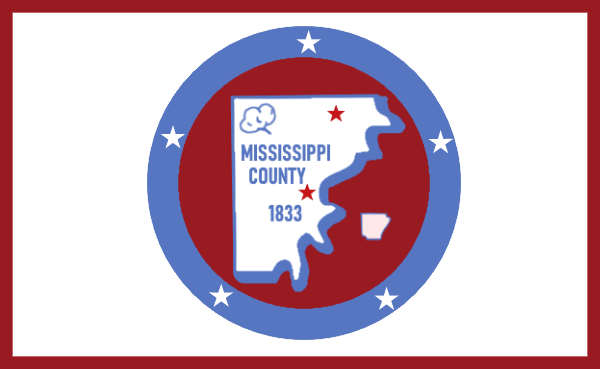
- Flag

- Location within the U.S. state of Arkansas
- Coordinates: 35°46′36″N 90°03′16″W
- Country: United States
- State: Arkansas
- Founded: November 1, 1833
- Named for: Mississippi River
- Seat: Blytheville and Osceola
- Largest city: Blytheville

Government
  - Judge: John Nelson

Area
  - Total: 920 sq mi (2,400 km^{2})
  - Land: 901 sq mi (2,330 km^{2})
  - Water: 19 sq mi (49 km^{2}) 2.1%

Population (2020)
  - Total: 40,685
  - Estimate (2025): 37,828 ▼
  - Density: 45.2/sq mi (17.4/km^{2})
- Time zone: UTC−6 (Central)
  - Summer (DST): UTC−5 (CDT)
- Congressional district: 1st
- Website: www.mississippicountyar.org

Mississippi County is the easternmost county in the U.S. state of Arkansas. As of the 2020 census, the population was 40,685. There are two county seats, Blytheville and Osceola. The county is named for the Mississippi River which borders the county to the east. Mississippi County is part of the First Congressional District in Arkansas.

The Blytheville, AR Micropolitan Statistical Area includes all of Mississippi County.

== History ==
=== Pre-European exploration ===
Extant early settlements include the Eaker Site and the Sherman Mound.

=== 1812 New Madrid earthquake ===
Local oral tradition held that prior to the major earthquakes of 1812, the lands in Mississippi County were higher in elevation compared to now and were not prone to flooding. Though the earthquake was named for New Madrid, Missouri, as that was the only town in the area with any population, the actual epicenter of the quake was three miles below what is now Blytheville, Arkansas.

=== Antebellum period ===
American settlers were recorded in the area as early as 1828. These early settlers include John Troy, the first Mississippi County Judge and namesake of Troy township and G.C. Barfield, the first county surveyor and namesake of Barfield Landing.

Mississippi County was created on November 1, 1833, when it was split off from Craighead County. By 1836, when Arkansas achieved statehood, the county's white population had slightly increased and the local Native population was pushed in the eastern part of the county, towards what is now Big Lake. The first county seat was a small community called Cornwall, which was located on the banks of the Mississippi River, on the remains of an old Spanish "encampment." Osceola was named as the County Seat in 1833, and later incorporated in 1843.

The Federal Swamp Act of 1850 granted federally controlled swamp lands to their respective state governments for sale. According to the 1852 surveyor general's report, Mississippi County had the largest amount of swamp and "Sunken" lands of any county in the country.

=== Reconstruction period ===
Following the American Civil War, Mississippi County was one of 10 counties in Arkansas put under martial law due to increased activity from the Ku Klux Klan. In 1872, a series of racial and political confrontations known as the Black Hawk War took place. The genesis of this was the murder of "Carpetbagger" Charles Fitzpatrick by the county Sheriff J.B. Murray over Fitzpatrick's allegations of Murray's embezzlement of school funds.

=== 20th century ===
During World War II, a B-25 pilot training school was constructed at Blytheville, with satellite landing strips at Manilla and in the Missouri Bootheel. The facility was later reopened in 1954 at Blytheville Air Force Base, and hosted a squadron of B-52s from 1959 to 1992.

In 1987, Nucor Steel opened a steel plant at Barfield Landing on the Mississippi River. In 2014, U.S. Steel opened a steel plant at Osceola. Mississippi County is now reportedly the largest steel producing county in America.

== Geography ==
According to the U.S. Census Bureau, the county has a total area of 920 square miles (2,400 km^{2}), of which 901 square miles (2,330 km^{2}) is land and 19 square miles (49 km^{2}) (2.1%) is water.

=== Major highways ===
- Interstate 55
- U.S. Highway 61
- U.S. Highway 78
- Highway 14
- Highway 18
  - Highway 18 Business
- Highway 77
- Highway 118
- Highway 119
- Highway 120
- Highway 135
- Highway 136
- Highway 137
  - Highway 137 Spur
- Highway 140
- Highway 148
- Highway 150
- Highway 151
- Highway 158
- Highway 181
- Highway 198
- Highway 239
  - Highway 239 Spur
- Highway 297
- Highway 308
- Highway 312
- Highway 325
- Highway 947
- Highway 980

=== Adjacent counties ===
- Dunklin County, Missouri (northwest)
- Pemiscot County, Missouri (north)
- Dyer County, Tennessee (northeast)
- Lauderdale County, Tennessee (east)
- Tipton County, Tennessee (southeast)
- Crittenden County (south)
- Poinsett County (southwest)
- Craighead County (west)

=== National protected area ===
- Big Lake National Wildlife Refuge

== Demographics ==
Historical population
Census	Pop.	Note	%±
1840	1,410		—
1850	2,368		67.9%
1860	3,895		64.5%
1870	3,633		−6.7%
1880	7,332		101.8%
1890	11,635		58.7%
1900	16,384		40.8%
1910	30,468		86.0%
1920	47,320		55.3%
1930	69,289		46.4%
1940	80,217		15.8%
1950	82,375		2.7%
1960	70,174		−14.8%
1970	62,060		−11.6%
1980	59,517		−4.1%
1990	57,525		−3.3%
2000	51,979		−9.6%
2010	46,480		−10.6%
2020	40,685		−12.5%
2025 (est.)	37,828	▼	−7.0%
U.S. Decennial Census; 1790–1960 1900–1990; 1990–2000 2010–2020 2020

=== 2020 census ===
As of the 2020 census, the county had a population of 40,685. The median age was 37.3 years. 25.8% of residents were under the age of 18 and 15.4% of residents were 65 years of age or older. For every 100 females there were 97.3 males, and for every 100 females age 18 and over there were 94.2 males age 18 and over.

The racial makeup of the county was 57.0% White, 35.2% Black or African American, 0.2% American Indian and Alaska Native, 0.6% Asian, <0.1% Native Hawaiian and Pacific Islander, 2.5% from some other race, and 4.4% from two or more races. Hispanic or Latino residents of any race comprised 4.4% of the population.

54.4% of residents lived in urban areas, while 45.6% lived in rural areas.

There were 16,036 households in the county, of which 32.8% had children under the age of 18 living in them. Of all households, 37.8% were married-couple households, 21.7% were households with a male householder and no spouse or partner present, and 33.6% were households with a female householder and no spouse or partner present. About 30.3% of all households were made up of individuals and 11.4% had someone living alone who was 65 years of age or older.

There were 19,075 housing units, of which 15.9% were vacant. Among occupied housing units, 54.9% were owner-occupied and 45.1% were renter-occupied. The homeowner vacancy rate was 3.2% and the rental vacancy rate was 12.8%.

=== 2010 census ===
As of the 2010 census, there were 46,480 people living in the county. The racial makeup of the county was 60.5% White, 33.9% Black, 0.3% Native American, 0.5% Asian, <0.0% Pacific Islander, 0.1% from some other race and 1.2% from two or more races. 3.6% were Hispanic or Latino of any race.

=== 2000 census ===
As of the 2000 census, there were 51,979 people, 19,349 households, and 13,911 families living in the county. The population density was 58 people per square mile (22 people/km^{2}). There were 22,310 housing units at an average density of 25 units per square mile (9.7 units/km^{2}). The racial makeup of the county was 64.45% White, 32.70% Black or African American, 0.26% Native American, 0.38% Asian, 0.03% Pacific Islander, 1.07% from other races, and 1.12% from two or more races. 2.25% of the population were Hispanic or Latino of any race.

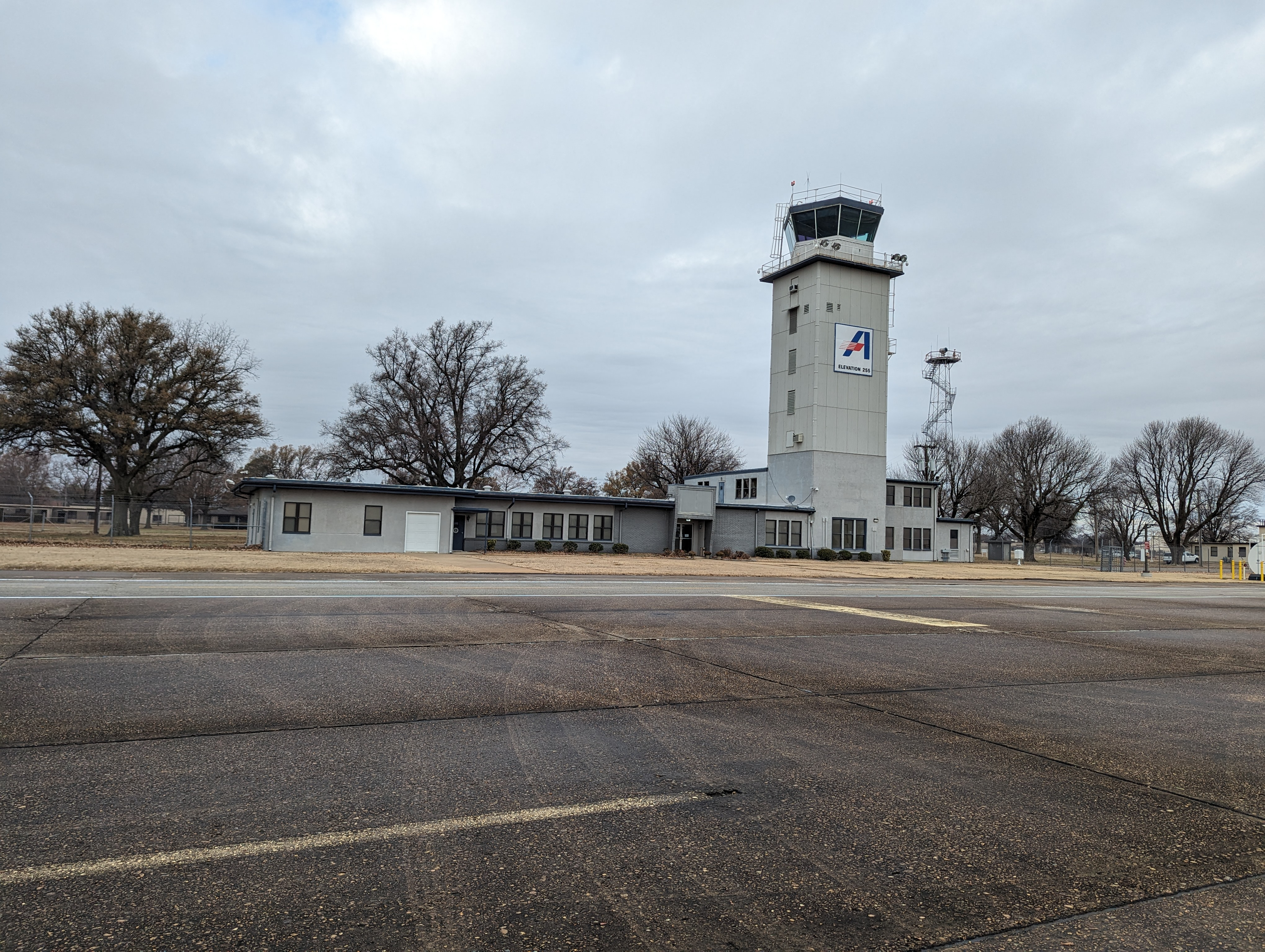
Control Tower for the Arkansas Aeroplex, formerly Blytheville Air Force Base. The Aeroplex contains the longest runway in the state.

There were 19,349 households, out of which 36.00% had children under the age of 18 living with them, 50.00% were married couples living together, 17.40% had a female householder with no husband present, and 28.10% were non-families. 24.70% of all households were made up of individuals, and 10.70% had someone living alone who was 65 years of age or older. The average household size was 2.64 and the average family size was 3.15.

In the county, the population was spread out, with 29.60% under the age of 18, 9.90% from 18 to 24, 27.50% from 25 to 44, 20.80% from 45 to 64, and 12.20% who were 65 years of age or older. The median age was 33 years. For every 100 females there were 91.80 males. For every 100 females age 18 and over, there were 87.70 males.

The median income for a household in the county was $27,479, and the median income for a family was $32,648. Males had a median income of $29,645 versus $19,782 for females. The per capita income for the county was $13,978. About 19.00% of families and 23.00% of the population were below the poverty line, including 31.10% of those under age 18 and 19.80% of those age 65 or over.

== Government ==
The county government is a constitutional body granted specific powers by the Constitution of Arkansas and the Arkansas Code. The quorum court is the legislative branch of the county government and controls all spending and revenue collection. Representatives are called justices of the peace and are elected from county districts every even-numbered year. The number of districts in a county vary from nine to fifteen, and district boundaries are drawn by the county election commission. The Mississippi County Quorum Court has eleven members. Presiding over quorum court meetings is the county judge, who serves as the chief executive officer of the county. The county judge is elected at-large and does not vote in quorum court business, although capable of vetoing quorum court decisions.

Mississippi County, Arkansas Elected countywide officials
Position	Officeholder	Party
County Judge	John Alan Nelson	Republican
County Clerk	Janice Currie	Democratic
Circuit Clerk	Leslie Mason	Republican
Sheriff	Dale Cook	Republican
Treasurer	Candice Nichols	(Unknown)
Collector	Susan McCormick	Republican
Assessor	Brannah Bibbs	Republican
Coroner	Karen Ash-Crane	Republican

The composition of the Quorum Court after the 2024 elections is 7 Republicans, 3 Democrats, and 1 Independent. Justices of the Peace (members) of the Quorum Court following the elections are:

- District 1: Drake Brown (R) of Manila
- District 2: Michael White (R) of Manila
- District 3: Neil Burge (R) of Blytheville
- District 4: Tobye McClanahan (R) of Blytheville
- District 5: Molly Jackson (R) of Blytheville
- District 6: Cecil McDonald (D) of Blytheville
- District 7: Butch Prunty (I)
- District 8: Ricky Ash (R) of Blytheville
- District 9: Harbans Mangat (D) of Osceola
- District 10: Betty Hepler (R) of Osceola
- District 11: Dr. Sumner R. "Reggie" Cullom Sr. (D) of Joiner

Additionally, the townships of Mississippi County are entitled to elect their own respective constables, as set forth by the Constitution of Arkansas. Constables are largely of historical significance as they were used to keep the peace in rural areas when travel was more difficult. The township constables as of the 2024 elections are:

- Big Lake: Keith Hill (R)
- Burdette: Terry McCanless Sr. (R)
- Carson Lake: Sumner R. Cullom Jr. (R)
- Chickasawba: Rob Rounsavail (R)
- Dyess: Kenneth Gilmore (R)
- Golden Lake: Lucky Smith (R)
- Half Moon: Carl W. Foster (R)
- Hector: Mark Dixon (R)
- Little River: Roger Ferrell (R)
- Monroe: Jim Creecy (R)
- Neal: Steve Lancaster (R)
- Scott: Dennis E. Tucker Sr. (R)

Formerly a traditionally Democratic area, Mississippi County has voted Republican in the past five presidential elections.

United States presidential election results for Mississippi County, Arkansas
Year	Republican		Democratic		Third party(ies)	
Year	No.	%	No.	%	No.	%
1896	168	17.06%	815	82.74%	2	0.20%
1900	378	39.01%	591	60.99%	0	0.00%
1904	417	37.40%	689	61.79%	9	0.81%
1908	1,167	51.57%	930	41.10%	166	7.34%
1912	263	20.23%	767	59.00%	270	20.77%
1916	417	25.03%	1,249	74.97%	0	0.00%
1920	1,050	35.23%	1,809	60.70%	121	4.06%
1924	703	24.86%	2,039	72.10%	86	3.04%
1928	1,324	22.83%	4,451	76.75%	24	0.41%
1932	364	5.87%	5,776	93.12%	63	1.02%
1936	303	5.89%	4,835	93.94%	9	0.17%
1940	616	10.46%	5,257	89.24%	18	0.31%
1944	1,292	24.68%	3,938	75.22%	5	0.10%
1948	771	12.17%	3,763	59.40%	1,801	28.43%
1952	4,586	39.65%	6,968	60.24%	13	0.11%
1956	4,269	38.97%	6,428	58.68%	258	2.36%
1960	4,983	47.08%	5,138	48.54%	464	4.38%
1964	6,213	41.67%	8,678	58.20%	20	0.13%
1968	4,369	28.17%	4,993	32.19%	6,147	39.64%
1972	10,931	74.73%	3,544	24.23%	152	1.04%
1976	6,009	36.80%	10,292	63.03%	27	0.17%
1980	7,170	43.67%	8,908	54.26%	339	2.06%
1984	10,180	57.30%	7,548	42.49%	38	0.21%
1988	7,841	52.67%	6,759	45.40%	288	1.93%
1992	4,697	29.43%	10,046	62.94%	1,219	7.64%
1996	3,919	29.36%	8,301	62.19%	1,127	8.44%
2000	5,199	41.31%	7,107	56.47%	280	2.22%
2004	6,121	43.25%	7,593	53.65%	439	3.10%
2008	6,976	49.79%	6,667	47.59%	367	2.62%
2012	6,603	49.37%	6,467	48.35%	305	2.28%
2016	7,061	53.48%	5,670	42.94%	473	3.58%
2020	7,296	59.12%	4,558	36.93%	488	3.95%
2024	6,963	64.97%	3,574	33.35%	180	1.68%

== Economy ==
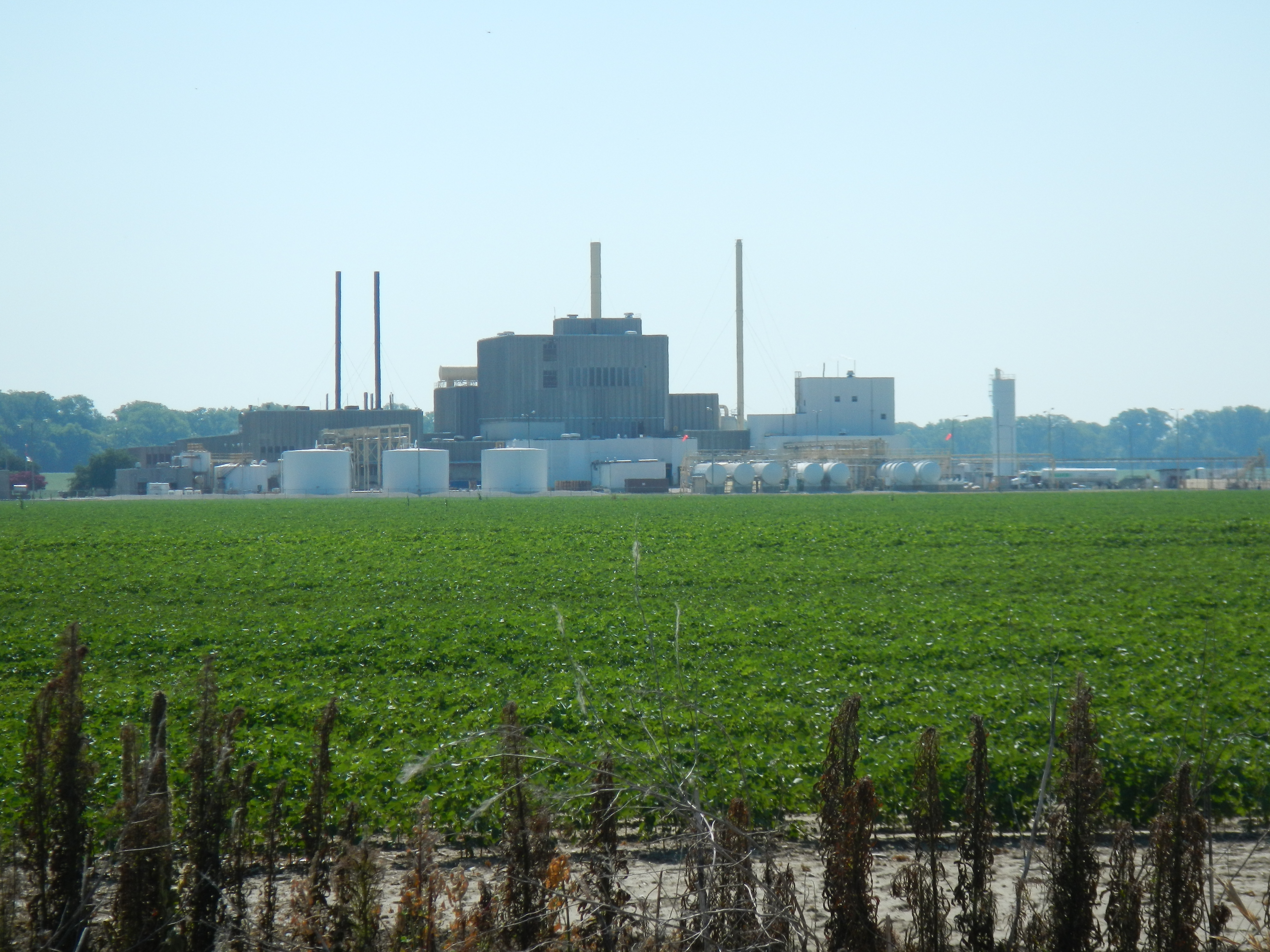
A steel plant rises behind a soybean field in Mississippi County

The economy of Mississippi County transitioned from agriculture (especially cotton) to manufacturing (mostly steel production) beginning in the 1980s. Over $2.1 billion has been invested in plants and supporting infrastructure in the county, with major facilities being operated by Nucor and Big River Steel (a U.S. Steel company). As of 2021 Mississippi County is the second-largest steel producing county in the United States. The county's position near the center of the United States and along the Mississippi River allows the input for steel mills, scrap metal, to be shipped in on barges, often the most inexpensive method of shipping, and by railroad from Memphis. Company executives have also praised the work ethic of the rural farm families of the area as a natural fit for ironworkers.

== Education ==
=== Public education ===
Mississippi County is home to the following public school districts, listed in order of student population:

- Blytheville School District
- Osceola School District
- Gosnell School District
- Rivercrest School District
- Manila School District
- Buffalo Island Central School District
- Armorel School District

The following school districts are based outside of the county but serve portions:

- East Poinsett County School District
- KIPP: Delta Public Schools
- Nettleton School District

=== Libraries ===
Mississippi County is served by the Mississippi–Crittenden Regional Library System, which includes the Mississippi County Library System (central library) and 13 branch libraries in communities throughout the county.

== Media ==
=== Radio ===
FM

- FM 88.3 KBCM Blytheville
- FM 93.9 KAMJ Gosnell
- FM 96.3 KHLS Blytheville
- FM 103.7 KBAI K279BJ Blytheville
- FM 107.3 KOSE-FM Osceola

AM

- AM 860 KOSE Wilson

=== Print ===
- NEA Town Courier, Newspaper, Blytheville, Arkansas
- The Osceola Times, Newspaper, Osceola, Arkansas

=== Television ===
There are no television stations in Mississippi County, Arkansas. Mississippi County, Arkansas is placed in the Memphis, TN Television Market. Those stations include:

- ABC- WATN 24
- NBC- WMC 5
- CBS- WREG 3
- Fox- WHBQ 13
- PBS- WKNO 10
- CW- WLMT 30
- Ion WPXX 50

However some residents in county may watch stations from the Jackson, TN, Jonesboro, AR, or Little Rock, AR Television Markets.

== Communities ==
=== Cities ===
- Blytheville (county seat)
- Gosnell
- Joiner
- Keiser
- Leachville
- Luxora
- Manila
- Osceola (county seat)
- Wilson

=== Towns ===
- Bassett
- Birdsong
- Burdette
- Dell
- Dyess
- Etowah
- Marie
- Victoria

=== Census-designated places ===
- Armorel

=== Townships ===
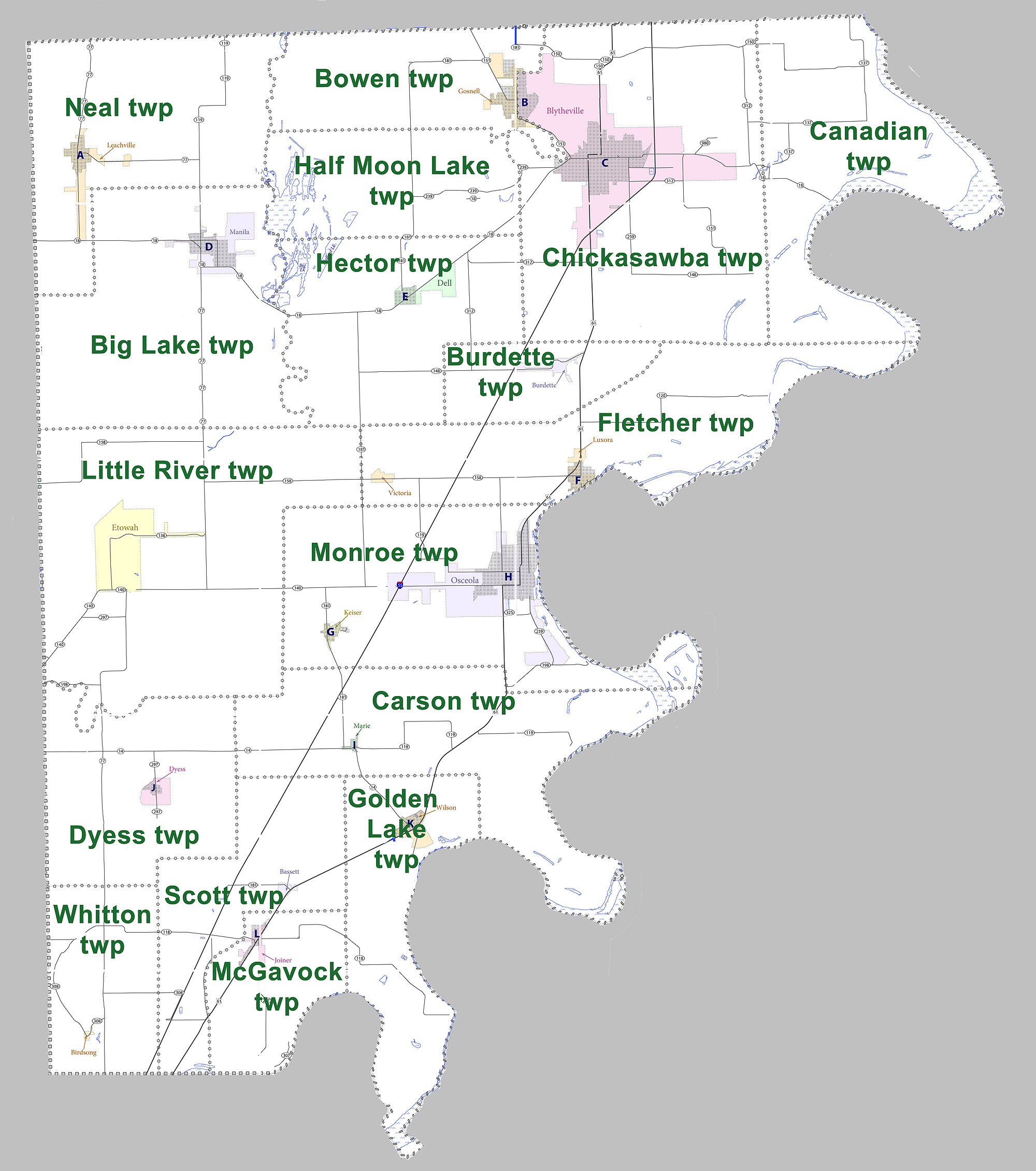
Townships in Mississippi County, Arkansas as of 2010

Townships in Arkansas are the divisions of a county. Each township includes unincorporated areas; some may have incorporated cities or towns within part of their boundaries. Arkansas townships have limited purposes in modern times. However, the United States census does list Arkansas population based on townships (sometimes referred to as "county subdivisions" or "minor civil divisions"). Townships are also of value for historical purposes in terms of genealogical research. Each town or city is within one or more townships in an Arkansas county based on census maps and publications. The townships of Mississippi County are listed below; listed in parentheses are the cities, towns, and/or census-designated places that are fully or partially inside the township.

- Big Lake (Manila)
- Bowen (Gosnell)
- Burdette (Burdette)
- Canadian (Huffman)
- Carson (Marie)
- Chickasawba (Blytheville)
- Dyess (Dyess)
- Fletcher (Luxora, Victoria)
- Golden Lake (Wilson)
- Half Moon Lake
- Hector (Dell)
- Little River (Etowah)
- McGavock (Joiner)
- Monroe (Keiser, Osceola)
- Neal (Leachville)
- Scott (Bassett)
- Whitton (Birdsong)

== See also ==
- Arkansas Highway 119 (1927–2022), former state highway in Mississippi County
- Island 35 Mastodon
- List of lakes in Mississippi County, Arkansas
- National Register of Historic Places listings in Mississippi County, Arkansas
