= Delta Valley and Southern Railway =

Railroad in Arkansas

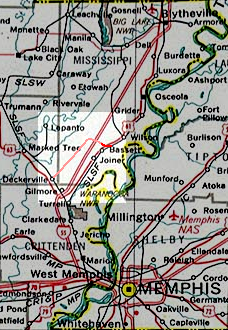
- Map of Delta Valley and Southern's active (red) and abandoned (pink) line

Overview
- Headquarters: Wilson, Arkansas
- Reporting mark: DVS
- Locale: Arkansas
- Dates of operation: 1893–Present
- Predecessor: St. Louis & San Francisco Railway
- Successor: Burlington Northern & Santa Fe Railway

Technical
- Track gauge: 4 ft 8 1/2 in (1,435 mm) standard gauge
- Length: 2 Miles

The Delta Valley and Southern Railway (reporting mark DVS) is a short-line railroad headquartered in Wilson, Arkansas.

DVS operates a two-mile line in Arkansas near Wilson with one switch engine.

== History ==
Originally constructed in the 1850s as a narrow gauge line to haul timber, this 18.1-mile (29.1 km) St. Louis-San Francisco Railway branch line ran from Evadale Junction (south of Wilson, Arkansas) in Mississippi County to Deckerville (south of Tyronza, Arkansas) in Poinsett County. The line was converted to standard gauge in 1898. By 1920, the Frisco was running multiple trains over the line from Deckerville to Osceola, Arkansas.

The line was abandoned by the Frisco Railway in June of 1934. It was soon after incorporated as the Delta Valley and Southern Railway in August 1934 by C.L. Deaton, C.W. Ferguson, L.P. Nicholson, and J.D. Newell. By 1950, it was being advertised as a freight railroad with daily freight services from Wilson. All but 2 miles (3.2 km) from Delpro to Evadale Junction was abandoned in 1947.

The railway company became a subsidiary of Lee Wilson & Company when the latter incorporated in 1958.

As of 1996, the railroad operated from its engine house at the present end of the line to a connection with the Burlington Northern Santa Fe (BNSF) south of Wilson. The line served one cotton processing plant owned by the R.E.L. Wilson company.

In 1970, the president of the company was R.E.L. Wilson 3rd, grandson of local plantation owner Robert E. Lee Wilson. In 2002, the president and director of the company was Michael Wilson.

Motive power was a GE 45-tonner side-rod locomotive, purchased new in May 1954, GE s/n 32129. The locomotive, DV&S 50, is on the National Register of Historic Places. The locomotive was housed in a single stall engine house built right over the main line of this short railroad, at the end of the line. However, that locomotive was sold in 2009.

By 2026, the line is now operated as a short line of Burlington Northern Santa Fe Railroad. Its office is located in the company town of Wilson, Arkansas.

== Surviving equipment ==
No. 73 is a 2-6-0 “Mogul” built by Baldwin in 1916. It has 19" cylinders and 49-1/2" driving wheels. Numbered as 34 by the Jonesboro, Lake City and Eastern Railroad before that line was sold to the St. Louis-San Francisco Railway ("Frisco") in 1925, the locomotive was renumbered to 73 and kept by the Frisco until sold on September 19, 1945, to the Delta Valley and Southern. It is preserved on the Lee Wesson Plantation in Victoria, Arkansas under the Delta Valley & Southern Locomotive No. 73 name with no visible numbers on the cab or tender, but with the original Frisco raccoon-skin-shaped number board and “73” on its nose.
