= Manila station (Arkansas) =

- Jonesboro, Lake City & Eastern Railroad Depot
- U.S. National Register of Historic Places
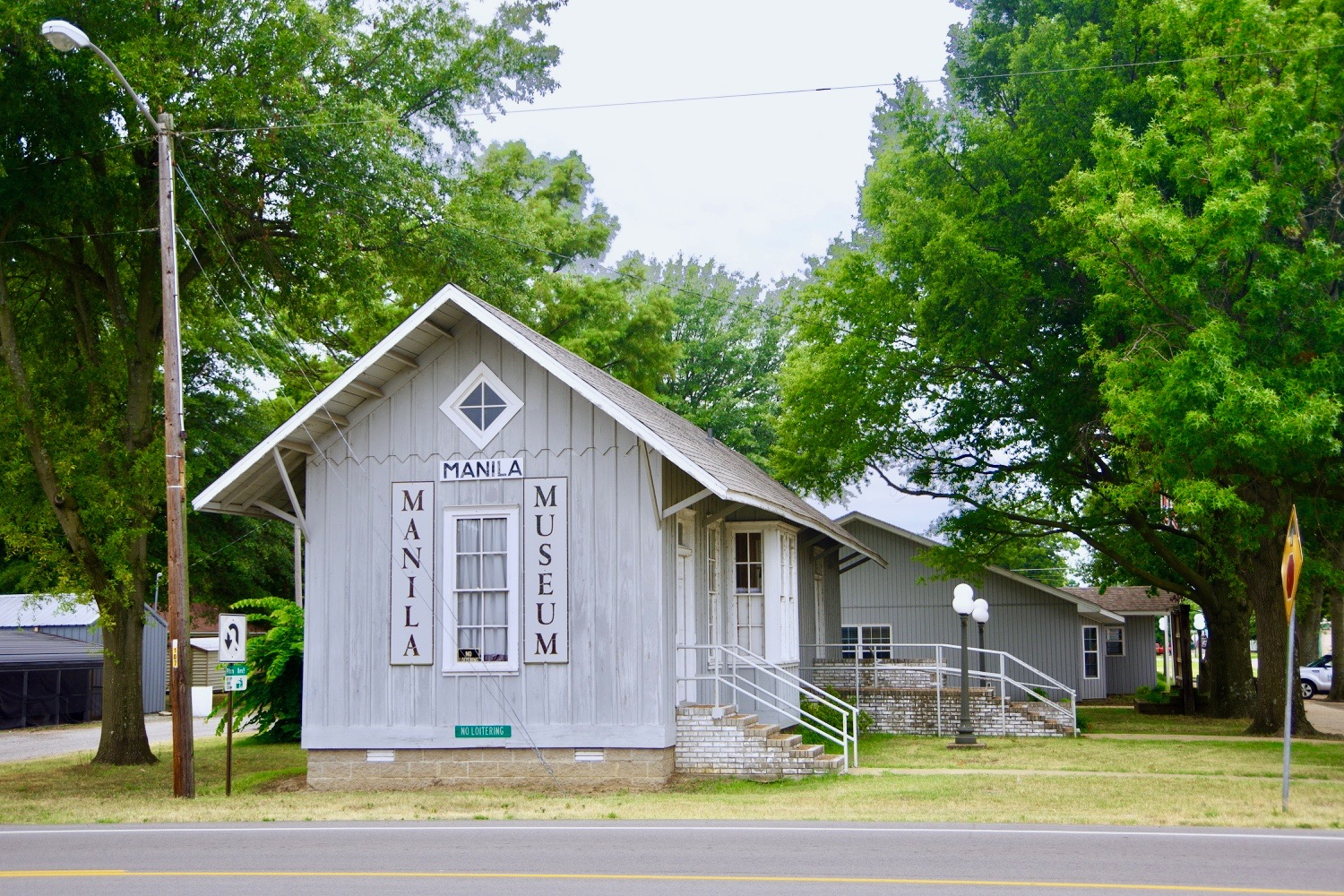
- The Manila Depot, looking west from Baltimore Avenue

- Location within Arkansas Location within the United States
- Location: Jct. of S. Dewey and Baltimore Sts., NW corner, Manila, Arkansas
- Coordinates: 35°52′43″N 90°10′0″W
- Area: less than one acre
- Built: 1910
- Architectural style: Plain traditional
- Restored: 1997
- MPS: Historic Railroad Depots of Arkansas MPS
- NRHP reference No.: 97000206
- Added to NRHP: March 8, 1997

The Jonesboro, Lake City & Eastern Railroad Depot is a historic former railroad station in Manila, Arkansas.

== History ==
The Jonesboro, Lake City and Eastern Railroad was chartered in 1897 by businessmen from Jonesboro, Arkansas in neighboring Craighead County to take advantage of the virgin timber of the "sunken lands" of the north eastern part of the state. The first train arrived in Manila on December 2, 1900, and the town would usually see four trains a day until 1938.

This station was built in 1910, and is a well-preserved example of a wood-frame board-and-batten station of the period. The following year, the railroad came under the ownership of prominent Mississippi County plantation owner Robert E. Lee Wilson. Though the depot was primarily utilized to serve the timber industry area, as Manila was also the fish processing center for that part of Arkansas, it was not uncommon for 40 tons of fish and other aquatic cargo to be shipped out of the depot on a daily basis.

The depot was formally closed on December 30, 1977. It is now owned by the city. The building was completely restored in 1997 with funds from the estates of Eena Wilson Grieshammer and her sister, Roxie Wilson Cates.

The depot was listed on the National Register of Historic Places in 1997.

== Building Description ==
It is a modest single-story wood-frame structure with a gable roof, standing at the northwest corner of South Dewey and Baltimore Streets. The board-and-batten walls are fenestrated by four over four double hung windows.

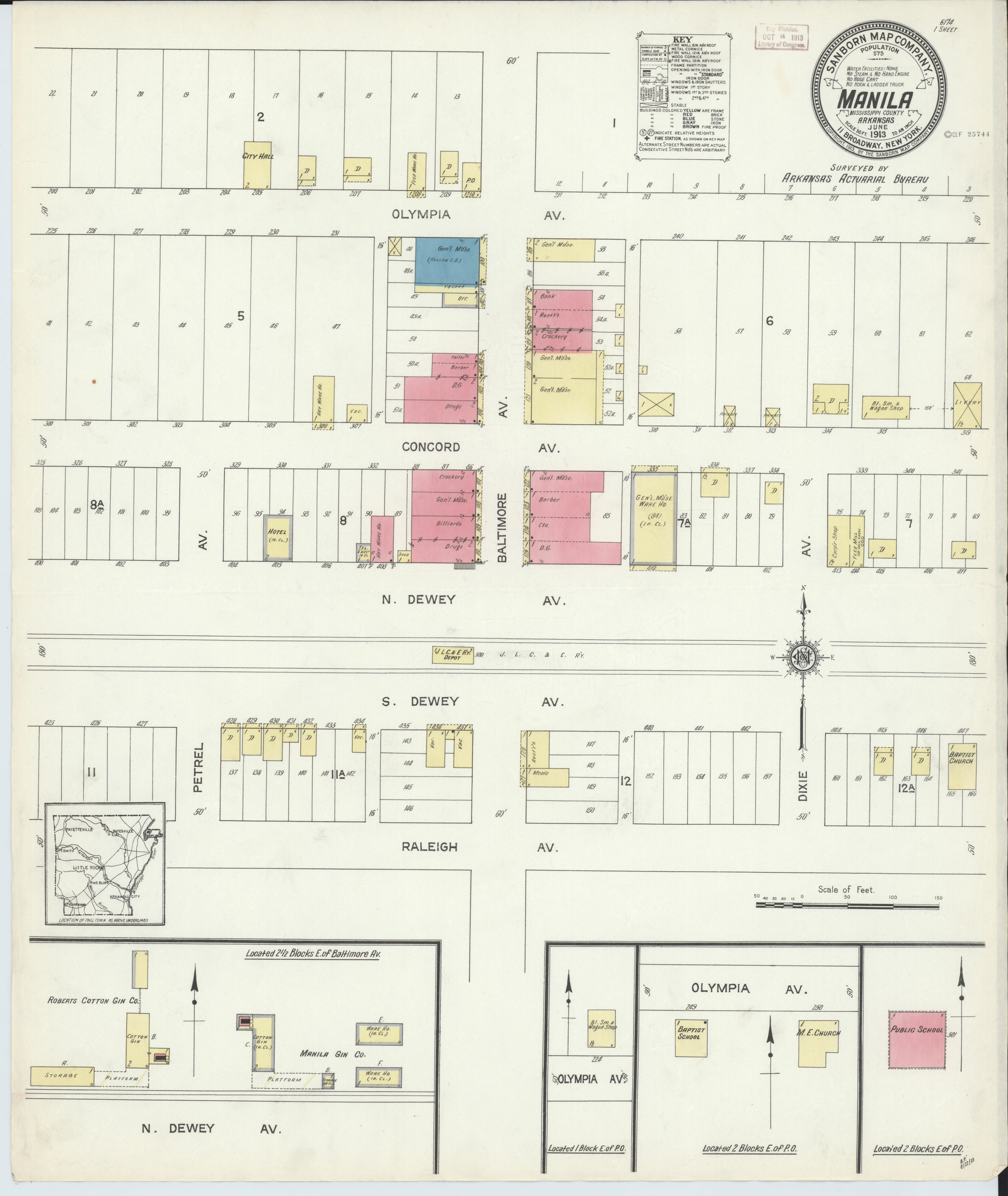
1913 Sanborn Fire Insurance Map showing the location of the Manila Depot

== Manila Depot Museum ==
In 2001, a museum was opened in the depot to interpret the history of the city of Manila. Exhibits include artifacts from local military veterans, and the depot office and waiting room are set up to recreate the heyday of Manila of the 1920s.

== See also ==
- National Register of Historic Places listings in Mississippi County, Arkansas
