= Jonesboro, Lake City and Eastern Railroad =

Jonesboro, Lake City, & Eastern Railroad
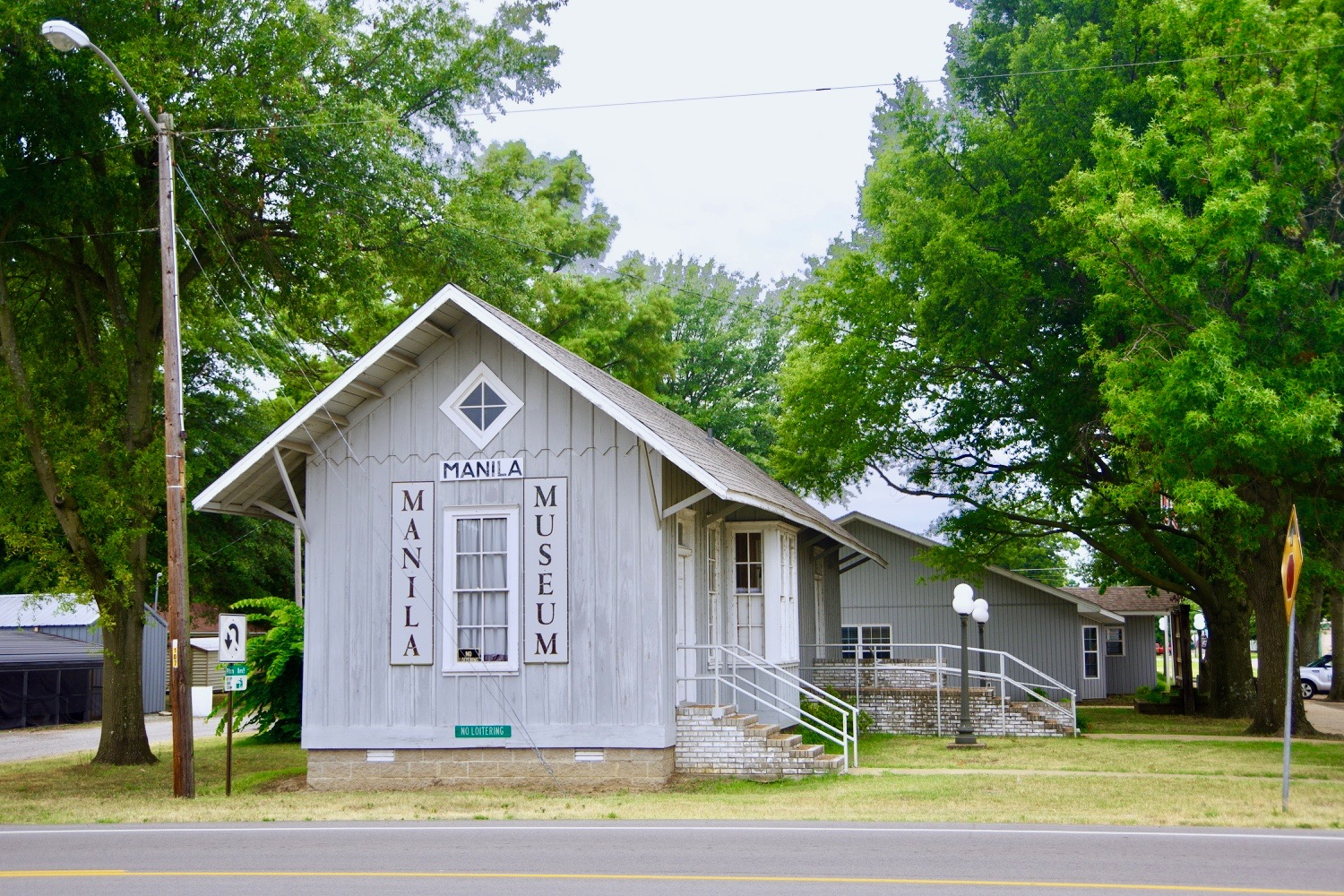
- The JLC&E Depot in Manila, Arkansas, constructed in 1910 and currently serving as a museum

Overview
- Headquarters: Jonesboro, Arkansas
- Key people: Robert E. Lee Wilson
- Locale: Arkansas
- Dates of operation: April 1897–1925
- Successor: St. Louis–San Francisco Railway

Technical
- Track gauge: 4 ft 8+1/2 in (1,435 mm) standard gauge

The Jonesboro, Lake City and Eastern Railroad (JLC&E) was a short-line railroad that operated in Mississippi and Craighead counties of northeast Arkansas. This railroad received a charter from the state of Arkansas on April 7, 1897, and track construction between Jonesboro and Blytheville began soon thereafter.

== History ==
=== Origins ===
The initial push to construct the JLC&E came from timber owners and land speculators in northeast Arkansas, all of whom saw the availability of railroad transportation as a necessary ingredient to harvesting timber. The group procured a charter from the Arkansas state legislature in 1897 to construct a railroad in Craighead and Mississippi Counties and began construction soon after. The largest hurdle was constructing bridges in the "sunken lands" east of Jonesboro, but the company was able to run its first train from Nettleton (now a suburb of Jonesboro) to Lake City in November of that year.

By the time the railroad line was extended to Blytheville in the summer of 1901, several large sawmills were either in operation or being built along the tracks. In early 1911, the JLC&E was purchased by Robert E. Lee Wilson, a prominent landowner who resided in Wilson, Arkansas.

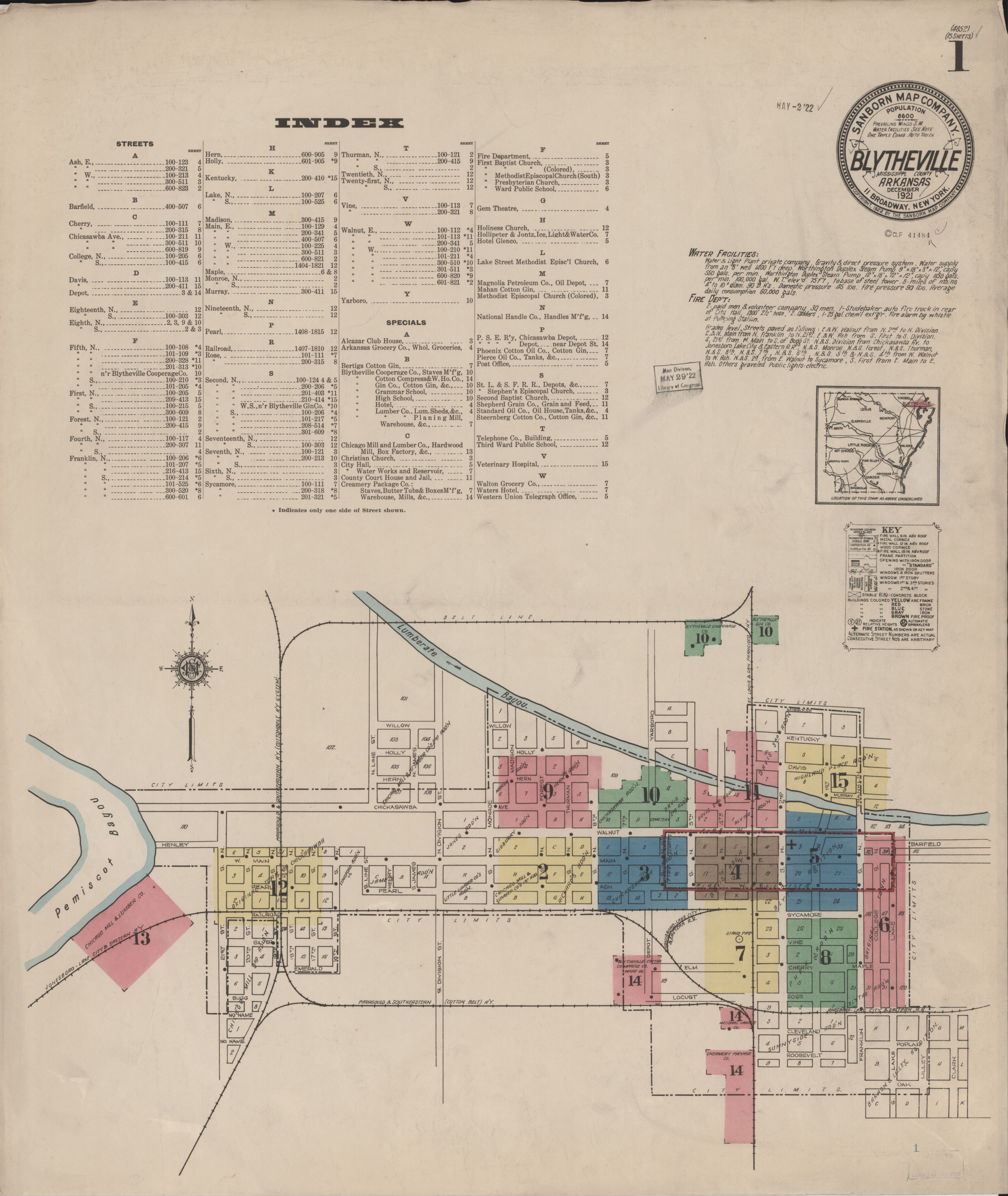
1925 Sanborn Fire Insurance Map of Blytheville, AR, showing the location of the JLC&E line in the town

=== Wilson Northern Railway ===
Separately, R.E. Wilson interests incorporated the Wilson Northern Railway (“WNR”) on December 28, 1904 under laws of Arkansas. On January 2, 1905, the WNR purchased an existing 10-mile private logging rail line, constructed as early as 1884, that was owned by Wilson. That line extended northward from a sawmill also controlled by Wilson interests at a location now known as Wilson, Arkansas, to Keiser, Arkansas. It then had constructed on its behalf an additional 7 miles of track from Keiser to Ross, Arkansas, where it had a connection with the JLC&E. The WNR also purchased lands for a proposed extension from Wilson, Arkansas to a point known as Bridge Junction, Arkansas; but, the extension was never built. On February 5, 1912, the JLC&E absorbed the WNR by purchase.

=== Chickasawba Railroad Company ===
The Chickasawba Railroad Company was incorporated October 13, 1902 under Arkansas law. Its stated goal was to construct a road from Blytheville, Arkansas eastward to Barfield Landing on the Mississippi River, and it actually built a 9-mile line from Blytheville to the river town of Barfield. On June 24, 1925, this was absorbed into the JLC&E.

=== Sale ===
The JLC&E railroad was purchased by the St. Louis–San Francisco Railway (Frisco) in 1925, and operated as a Frisco branch line into the 1970s. All of the former JLC&E tracks have been dismantled, except for a short segment between Blytheville and Armorel, Arkansas.

== Surviving equipment ==
No. 34 is a 2-6-0 “Mogul” built by Baldwin in 1916 and operated on the JLC&E. It has 19-inch (480 mm) cylinders and 49 1/2-inch (1.26 m) driving wheels. When the line was sold to the Frisco, the locomotive was renumbered to 73 and kept by the Frisco until sold on September 19, 1945, to the Delta Valley and Southern Railway. The engine is preserved on the Lee Wesson Plantation in Victoria, Arkansas under the Delta Valley & Southern Locomotive No. 73 name with no visible numbers on the cab or tender, but with the original Frisco raccoon-skin-shaped number board and “73” on its nose.

No. 40 and No. 41 are 2-8-0 Consolidation-type engines built by the Baldwin Locomotive Works in December 1920 for the JLC&E. When the line became part of the Frisco, the locomotives were renumbered as 76 and 77. After performing freight service for years, both engines were sold in 1947 to the Mississippian Railway where they retained the Frisco numbers. After several further changes in ownership for each, No. 40 is now owned by the B&O Railroad Museum in Oakland, Maryland, where it has been renumbered and relettered as the Baltimore & Ohio 476, and No. 41 is now with Alberta Prairie Railway in Stettler, Alberta, where it pulls excursion trains and has been renumbered back to the original 41.

== See also ==
- Manila station (Arkansas): JLC&E station
