= Herman Davis State Park =

State park in Arkansas, United States

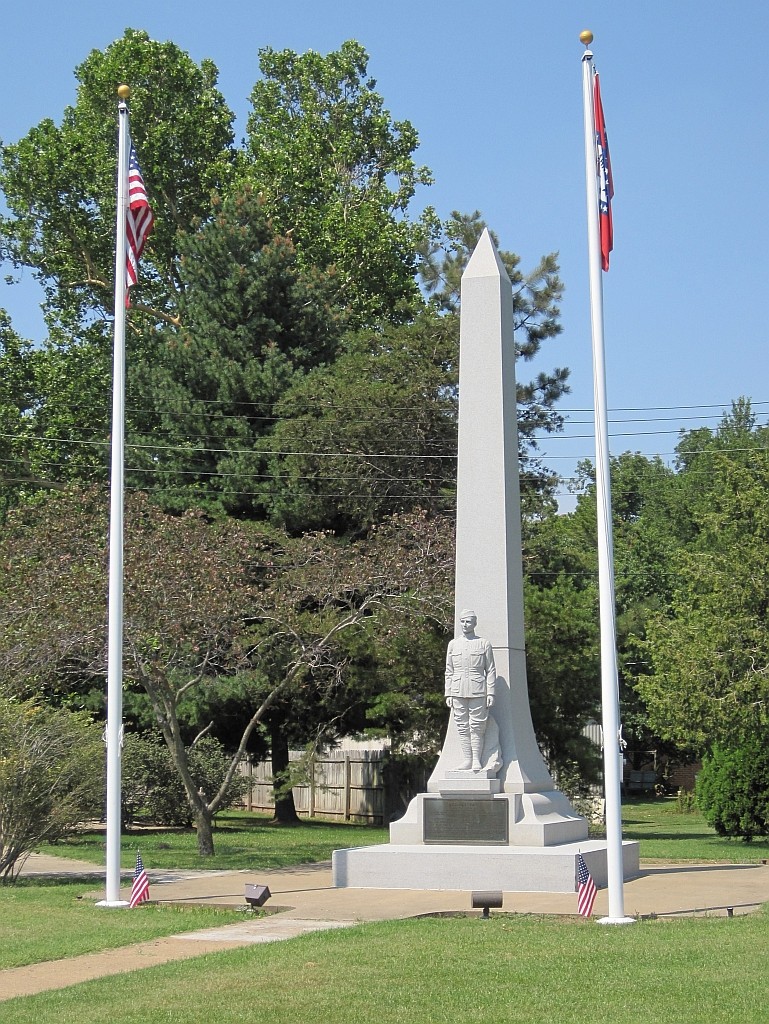
- Herman Davis Memorial, 2011

- Location within Arkansas Location within the United States
- Location: Mississippi County, Arkansas, United States
- Coordinates: 35.8731°N 90.1661°W
- Area: 1 acre (0.40 ha)
- Named for: Herman Davis
- Governing body: Arkansas Department of Parks and Tourism
- Website: Herman Davis State Park

Herman Davis State Park is a 1-acre (0.40 ha) state park in Manila, Arkansas, United States. The park includes the grave of and a memorial to Herman Davis (1888-1923), a U.S. sniper during World War I. The park is located at the junction of Baltimore Avenue and Arkansas Highway 18, south of the city center. It consists of a grassy area, with a concrete walk leading to the memorial. The memorial is a granite obelisk, 25 feet (7.6 m) in height, in front of which stands a full-size granite likeness of Davis in his infantry uniform. Davis' remains are buried just behind the monument. Davis is also honored with a fountain on the grounds of the Old State House in Little Rock. The fountain was a part of the Arkansas exhibition at the 1876 Philadelphia Centennial Exposition. In 1954, the three-tiered iron fountain was renamed the Herman Davis Memorial Fountain. Davis, a native of Manila, won distinction in the war for taking out a nest of German machine gunners with his marksmanship. Davis was a modest man and rarely mentioned the awards he received for this and other actions (including the US Distinguished Service Medal and two French Croix de Guerre), but was called out by General John J. Pershing, who placed him fourth on a list of 100 heroes of the war.

After his death, Arkansans rallied to erect a memorial in his honor, resulting in the establishment of this site as a local memorial in 1925. The park was formally designated a state park in 1953, and the Arkansas Department of Parks and Tourism is responsible for its maintenance. The original statue of Davis, executed in marble, was destroyed by vandals in 1967; it was replaced by the present statue. The park was listed on the National Register of Historic Places in 1995.

== See also ==
- National Register of Historic Places listings in Mississippi County, Arkansas
