= Wayne Wagner =

Arkansas politician

Wayne Wagner (February 19, 1946 – June 30, 2022) was a lawyer, state legislator, and mayor in Arkansas. He was a member of the Arkansas House of Representatives from 1987 to 1998. Term limits prevented him from running again. He served three terms as mayor of Manila, Arkansas.

Wagner was born February 19, 1946, in Manila to Oscar Bryan Wagner and Bertha Griffin Wagner and died on June 30, 2022, at 76 years old.
