= Comal Power Plant =

- U.S. National Register of Historic Places
- U.S. Historic district
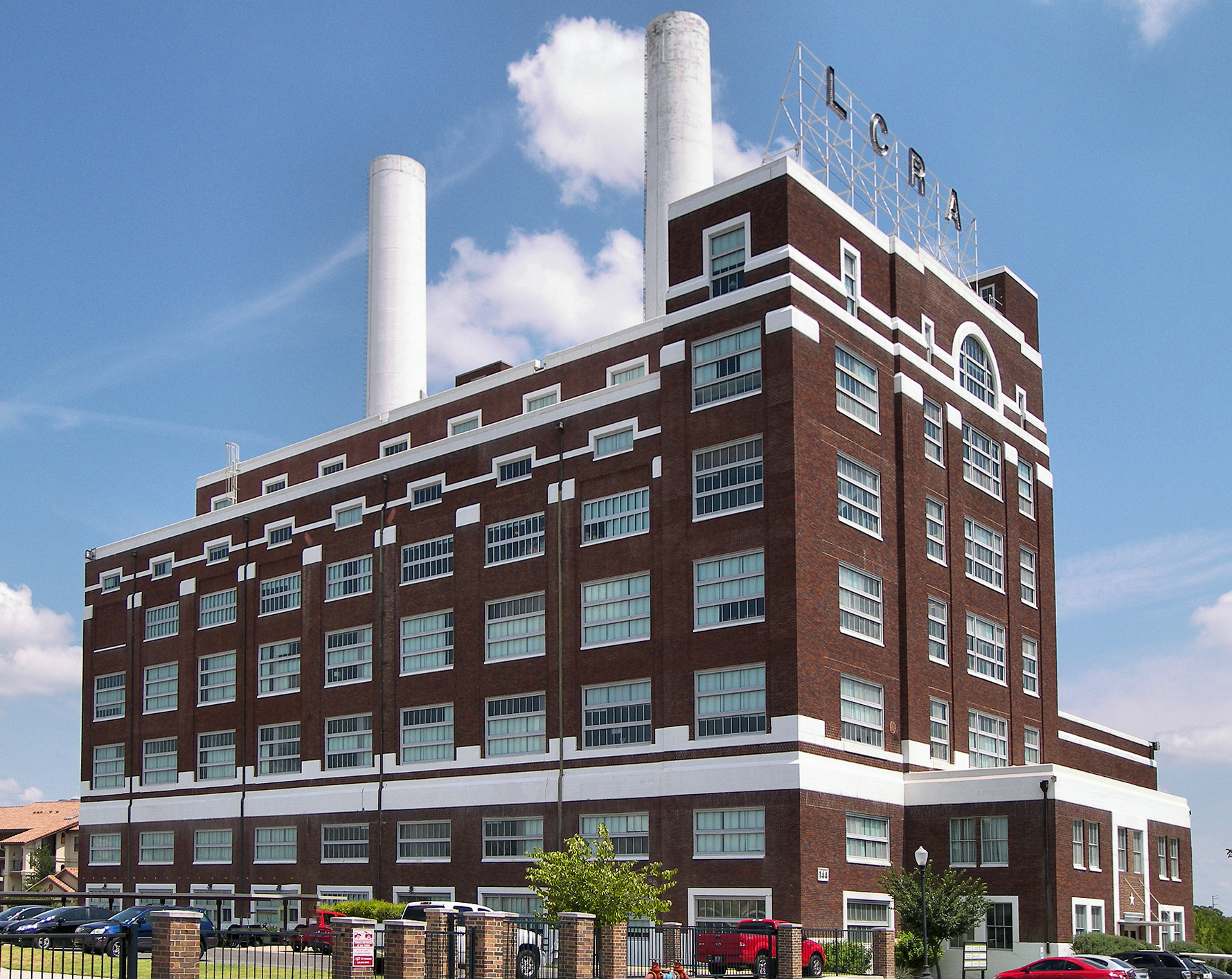
- Comal Power Plant in 2012

- Location within Texas Location within the United States
- Location: 144 Landa St., New Braunfels, Texas
- Coordinates: 29°42′23″N 98°7′57″W
- Area: 13.7 acres (5.5 ha)
- Built: 1925
- Built by: United Gas Improvement Const. Co., Philadelphia
- Architectural style: Classical Revival
- NRHP reference No.: 04000895
- Added to NRHP: August 20, 2004

The Comal Power Plant was originally a lignite (brown coal) power generating facility, built starting in 1925, in New Braunfels, Comal County, Texas. It was decommissioned in the 1970s, and was listed on the National Register of Historic Places in 2004. It has since been converted to The Landmark Lofts apartments. At its peak, the plant supplied about 70 MW.

== History ==
The plant was built near the Comal Canal, which was the main source of water to cool the turbines and generators. Power was derived from fuel-burning steam generators, it was not a hydroelectric plant. The Comal Power Plant supplied power to central Texas, as well as several nearby military bases, particularly during World War II when the plant was temporarily under the direction of the United States War Department.

The plant was designed to use lignite, a low energy form of coal that, while relatively inexpensive, required special shipping and processing to use as a fuel source. Once natural gas was made available in the area around 1927, the plant began a conversion to natural gas as its primary heat source with fuel oil as a secondary source. This was completed in 1929, and reduced the manpower needed by the plant from a peak of 135 workers to less than half of that number. During the Great Depression, the plant reduced the work week from six to five days to allow additional workers to be added to the payroll.

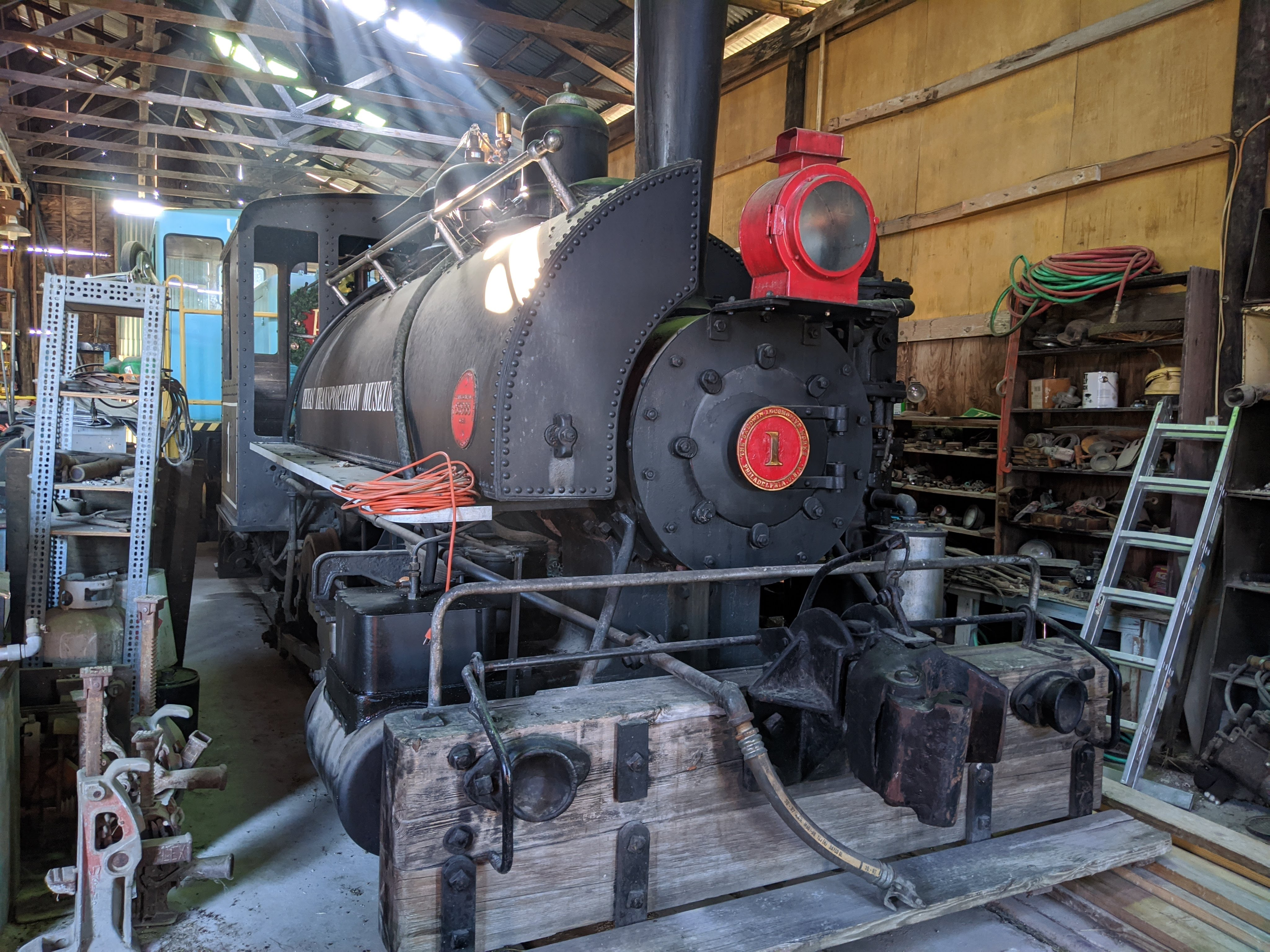
No. 1 in storage at the Texas transportation museum with broken valve gear awaiting repairs

In 1925, a small 23.5 ton 0-4-0 steam locomotive was built at Baldwin Locomotive Works for the San Antonio Public Services Company. This locomotive was used for only the two years the plant burned lignite and was subsequently put on display at the power plant after the conversion to gas and was regularly painted silver in an effort preserve it. The locomotive was equipped with a vastly oversized air compressor and five air tanks to operate a rotary car dumper in the plant. In the early 1960s, a group of volunteers who organized as the Texas Transportation Museum were able to get the locomotive donated to their new organization. They moved it to the old tracks around the Pearl Brewery San Antonio, Texas and fired it up there and used it to give train rides to passengers. After decades in storage, the locomotive is today preserved and stored awaiting repairs at the Longhorn and Western Railroad at the Texas Transportation Museum

== Closing ==
The 1970s energy crisis caused the price of natural gas to climb and its availability to decrease, forcing the plant to switch to fuel oil when its natural gas contract expired at the start of 1973. The expense of the additional workers needed to maintain the plant when using fuel oil resulted in the closing of the facility on June 16, 1973. The turbine generators and ancillary equipment were sold or relocated to other plants in the late 1970s and 1980s. At the end, the remaining equipment was disassembled and sold for scrap.

== See also ==
- National Register of Historic Places listings in Comal County, Texas
- List of power stations in Texas
