= Jerry Jaye =

American country/rockabilly singer (born 1937)

Jerry Jaye (born October 19, 1937 in Manila, Arkansas) is an American country/rockabilly singer.

Jaye grew up on a sharecropper's farm and did a stint in the Navy from 1954 to 1958. After his return he started a band with bassist Tommy Baker and drummer Carl Frye, who began playing the local Arkansas circuits. In 1966, the group traveled to Memphis, Tennessee, and recorded a single, "My Girl Josephine" (a hit for Fats Domino the previous decade). The single was initially released in a press run of 500; Jaye shopped the disc to local radio stations, and as the tune began getting airplay, Jaye signed a contract with Hi Records for national distribution. Re-released in 1967, "My Girl Josephine" became a hit single in the US, peaking at No. 29 on the Billboard Pop Singles chart. A full-length LP, My Girl Josephine, followed, which hit No. 195 in the US, but four further singles from the album failed to make an impact on the charts. During this time Jaye toured with Booker T and the MGs and Lou Rawls among others.

Jaye left Hi Records in 1970 and began recording new material for Nashville's Mega/Raintree. Seven singles were released, some of which found regional success. Between 1974 and 1975 he sang lead with the Bill Black Combo after its founder's death. In 1975, Jaye signed with Columbia Records, first releasing a cover of Tommy Edwards's "It's All in the Game". This was followed by two further US Country hits (again with Hi Records) in 1976, "Honky Tonk Women Love Redneck Men" (US Country No. 32) and "Hot and Still Heatin' (US Country No. 78). In 1979 he left Hi again, and began touring the American South with his wife Darlene Battles. Together they released an album on Bejay Records in 1984. Jaye toured Sweden and England in the 1990s, and released another album, One More Time, in 2005.
