= Herman Davis =

American sniper (1888–1923)

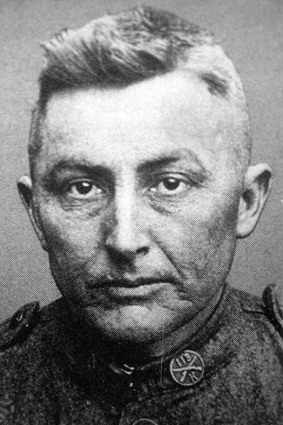
- Davis in uniform, circa 1918
- Born: January 3, 1888; Manila, Arkansas, U.S.
- Died: January 5, 1923 (aged 35); Memphis, Tennessee, U.S.
- Military career
- Allegiance: United States
- Branch: United States Army
- Service years: 1918–1919
- Rank: Private
- Units: 113th Infantry Regiment
- Conflicts: Meuse-Argonne Offensive
- Awards: Distinguished Service Cross; Croix de guerre (France)

Herman Davis (January 3, 1888 – January 5, 1923) was a decorated American sniper of World War I. He was a United States Infantry Private Company I, 113th Infantry Regiment, 29th Division.

Born in Manila, Arkansas, Davis was drafted into the Army in March 1918. On October 10, 1918, he achieved distinction by killing four German machine gunners, using a standard-issue 1903 Springfield with open sights, near Verdun during the Meuse-Argonne Offensive. The gunners had pinned his platoon down, and his actions secured safety to advance for the platoon. In another instance, Davis shot and killed five enemy crew members that were setting up a machine gun 1,000 yards away in an area they thought was out of range of American troops. Being told the distance was too great, he said, "Why, that is just a good shootin' distance." His marksmanship was attributed to the skill he had developed as a youngster hunting small game in the Big Lake area.

General Pershing named Davis fourth among the 100 greatest heroes of World War I. He received the Distinguished Service Cross, the Croix de Guerre with palm, the Croix de Guerre with Gilt Star, and the Médaille Militaire awards from the American and French governments. Davis was honorably discharged from the Army on May 29, 1919. After the war, he returned home and died four years later, on January 5, 1923, during an operation related to tuberculosis that he possibly contracted from exposure to poison gas during the war.

Herman Davis State Park, in his hometown of Manila, a monument located in the park and a street in Manila, honors him. Other streets in Davis' hometown of Manila are named after another military honoree, Admiral George Perry.

== Sources ==
- "Arkansas' Greatest Hero Lies in Unmarked Grave Herman Davis memorial Association to Erect Monument". The Osceola Times. Osceola, Ark. August 31, 1923.
- "Herman Davis (1888–1923)". Encyclopedia of Arkansas.
