= Texas Transportation Museum =

- Established: 1964
- Location: San Antonio, Texas
- Coordinates: 29.548163°N 98.434766°W
- Type: Transportation Museum
- Website: txtransportationmuseum.org

The Texas Transportation Museum (TTM) is a transportation museum located in San Antonio, Texas.

It was created in 1964 to help preserve artifacts and information about San Antonio's transportation history. TTM operates as much of its collection as possible, including many railroad vehicles on its own heritage railroad, the Longhorn and Western Railroad, multiple model train layouts, and many antique automobiles. TTM's goal is to provide an educational and entertaining experience which interprets how developments in transportation technology shaped and continue to impact daily life.

The museum hosts three major events annually, an Easter egg hunt in April for Easter, "Spook-Track-Ula" in October for Halloween, and "Santa's Railroad Wonderland" in December for Christmas. High school Cross Country running races starting from the adjacent North East ISD Sports Park run through the property as well.

Different areas, including a remodeled caboose, picnic tables, children's play area and a large outdoor pavilion can be rented for group parties. The children's play area includes a playscape consisting of a wooden steam engine and a metal scale-model diesel engine.

TTM is a registered 501(c)(3) charitable organization.

== History ==
The museum was formed in 1964 after some Railfans tried to restore a steam locomotive that was being displayed at the Comal Power Plant. The locomotive was taken to the Pearl Brewery and fired up where it spread black soot across the area.

The museum was originally located at the Pearl Brewing Company in Downtown San Antonio and had used the tracks of the Texas Transportation Company. In 1967 the museum was granted use of approximately forty acres (16 ha) of what was then known as the Northeast Preserve, now McAllister Park, just north of the San Antonio International Airport on Wetmore Road.

== Longhorn and Western Railroad ==
The Longhorn and Western Railroad is the Texas Transportation Museum's standard gauge heritage railroad that operates on its property with no connection to the general rail system. The L&W consists of approximately 5/8-mile (1.0 km) of trackage in total, with its mainline that runs 1/3-mile (0.54 km) from the east and west ends of the property.

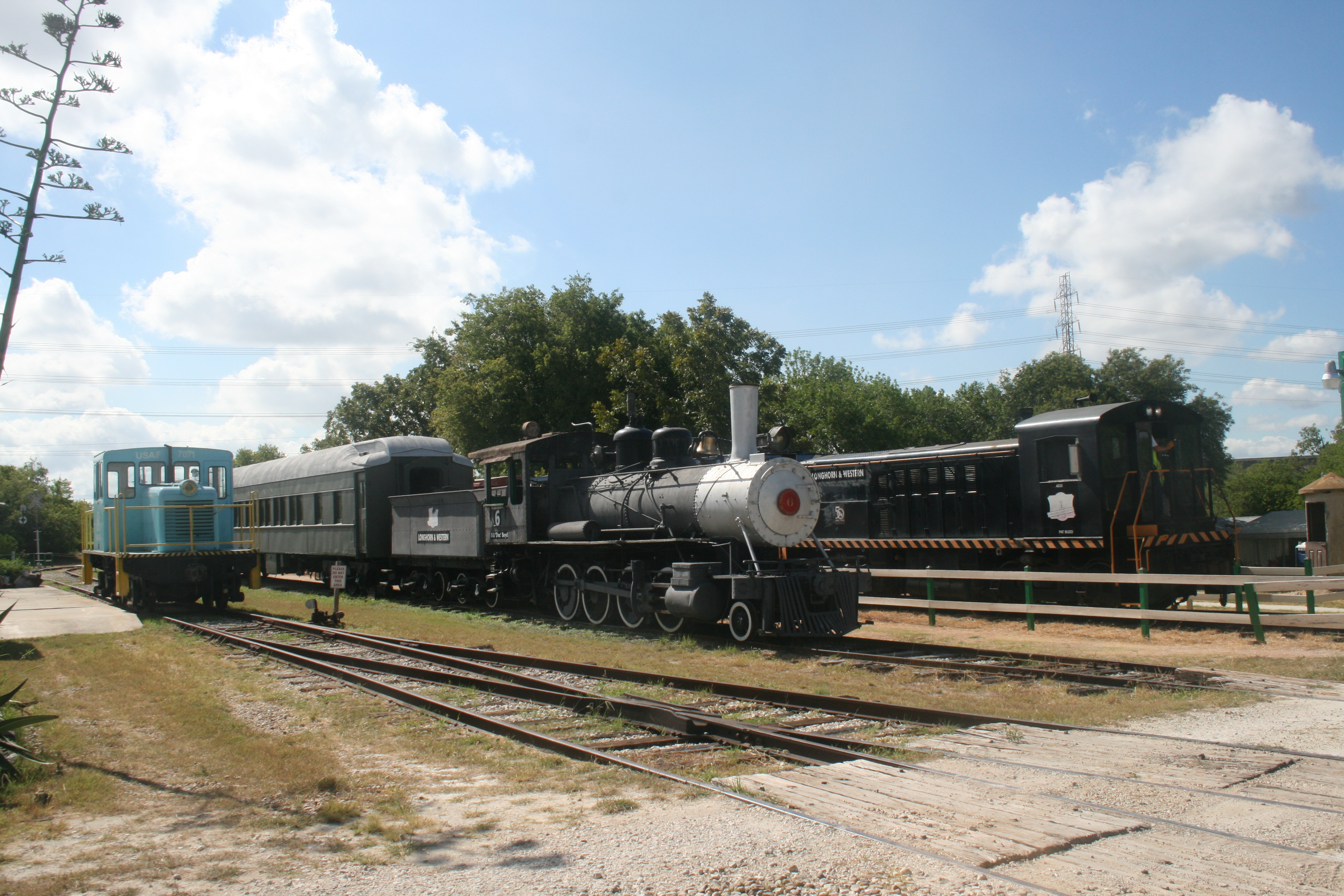
Left to right: 1942 GE 45-ton switcher #7071, 1911 Baldwin 2-8-0 #6, and 1954 Baldwin RS-4-TC 1A #4035

=== Rolling stock preserved on the L&W ===
==== Operating ====
- US Army 1954 Baldwin RS-4-TC 1A Switcher #4035
- US Air Force 1942 GE 45-ton switcher #7071
- Comal Power Plant 1925 Baldwin 0-4-0T #1
- Missouri Pacific Railroad Flat car #50043
- Missouri Pacific Railroad Caboose #13083
- US Marine Corps Fairmont motor car #256260

==== Static display ====
- Moscow, Camden and San Augustine Railroad 1911 Baldwin 2-8-0 Steam locomotive #6
- Atchison, Topeka and Santa Fe Railway Pullman business car #404
- Pullman Company (operated by Missouri–Kansas–Texas Railroad) 1924 Pullman McKeever sleeper car
- Union Pacific Railroad Caboose #25275
- Missouri Pacific Railroad Caboose #11919 - Awaiting restoration
- Missouri Pacific Railroad Caboose #13430 - Converted into a birthday party room
- Miscellaneous railroad speeders

== Antique vehicles ==
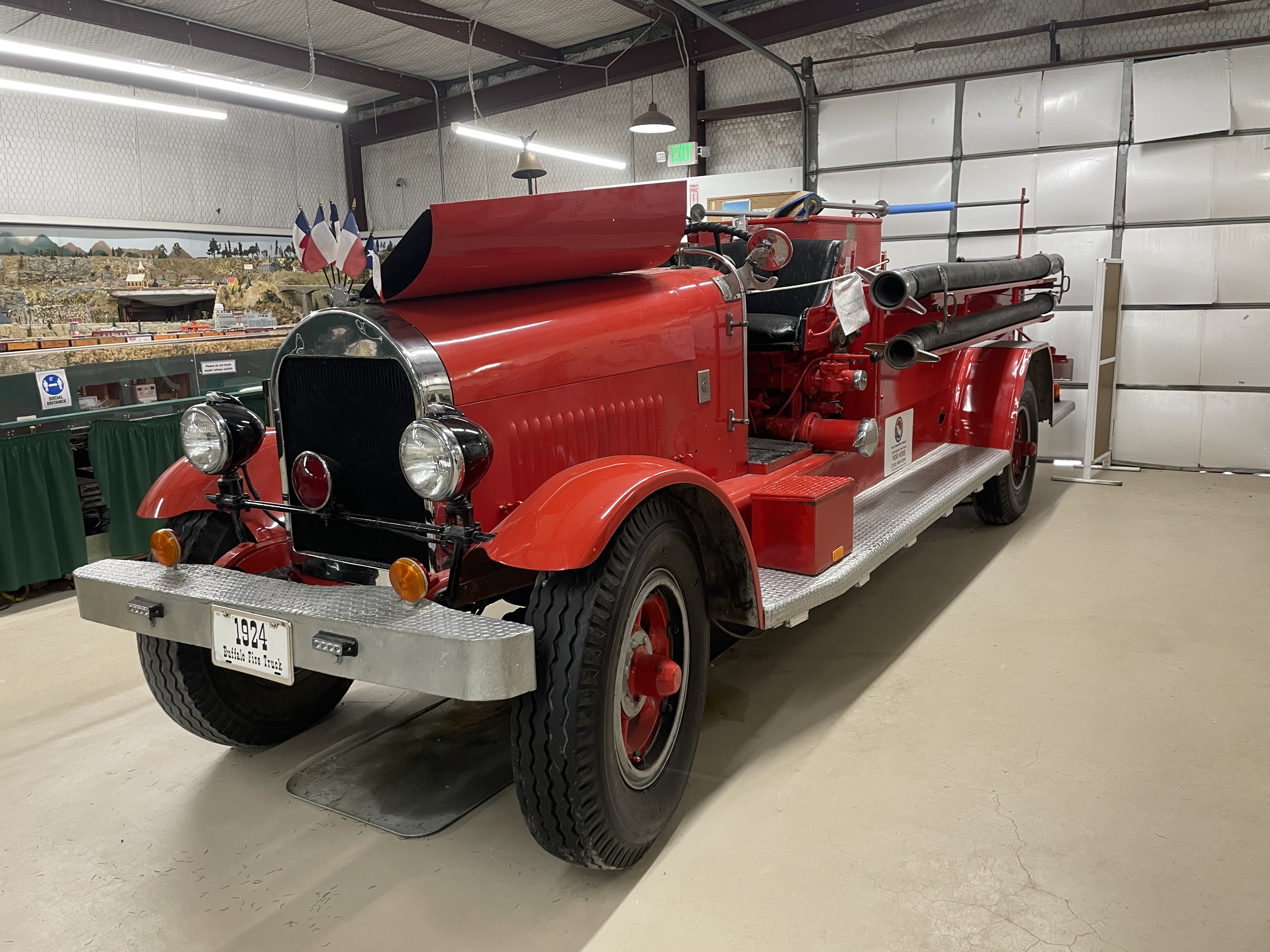
1924 Buffalo Type 50 fire engine

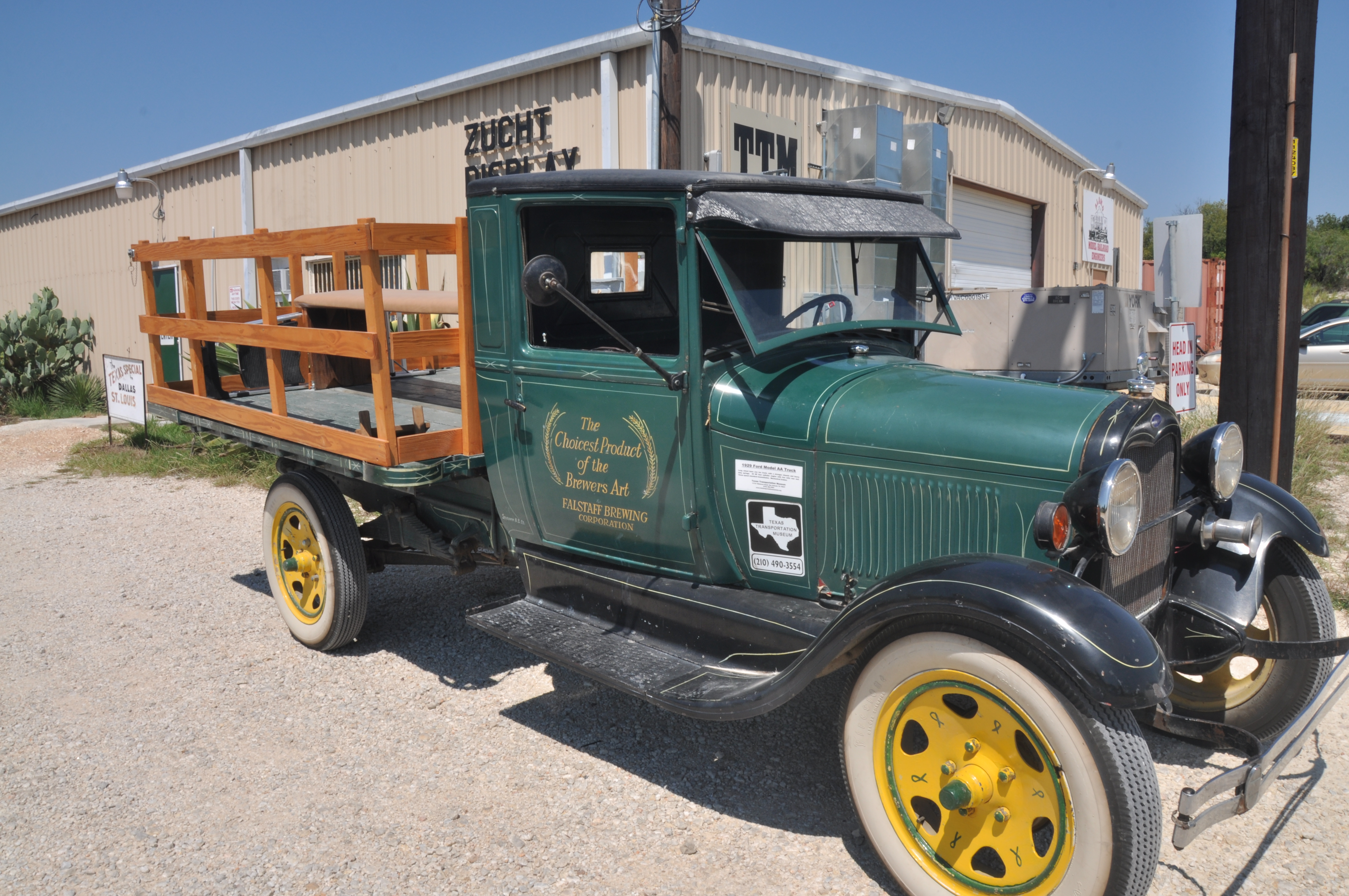
Ford Model AA Truck

=== Fire apparatus ===
- 1898 American LaFrance steam pumper
- 1924 Buffalo Type 50 fire engine
- 1947 Mack Type 85

=== Tractors ===
- 1939 Case
- 1941 Cletrac DG-5
- 1948 Ford 8N
- 1946 John Deere Model H

=== Cars and trucks ===
- 1929 Ford Model AA
- 1931 Ford Model A Tudor
- 1924 Ford Model TT
- 1903 Oldsmobile Curved Dash
- 1918 Oldsmobile Speedster

=== Carriages ===
- 1900 Doctor’s Carriage
- 1898 Victorian Brougham
- 1903 Studebaker

== Model railroad displays ==
- HO scale layout operated by the Alamo Model Railroad Engineers (AMRE)
- G gauge outdoor layout operated by the San Antonio Garden Railroad Engineers Society (SAGRES)
- N scale layout operated by the San Antonio N-Trak Association (SANTRAK)
- O scale layout operated by TTM volunteers
- Z scale layout

== Gallery ==
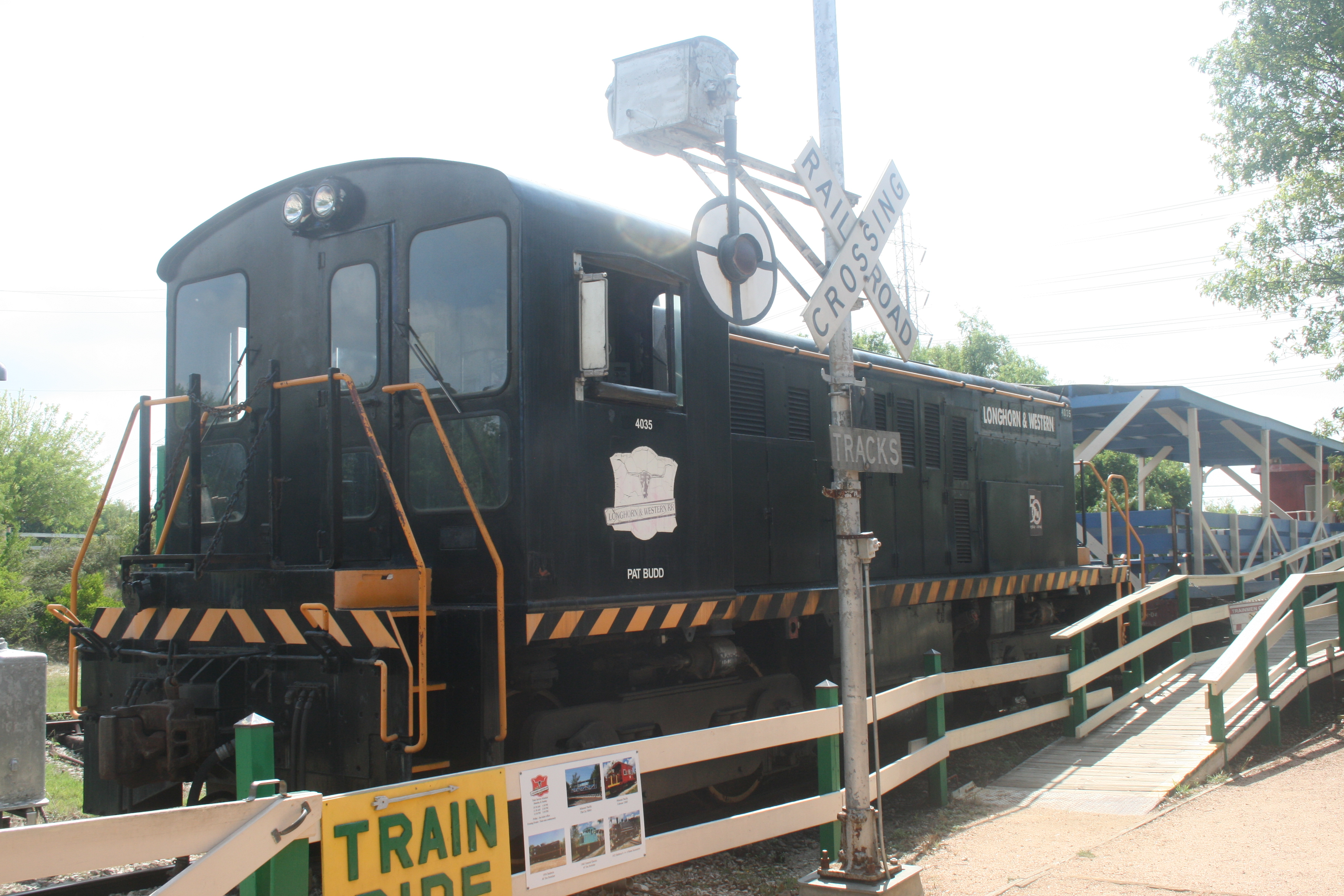
Former US Army 1954 Baldwin RS-4-TC 1A Diesel-Electric Switcher #4035

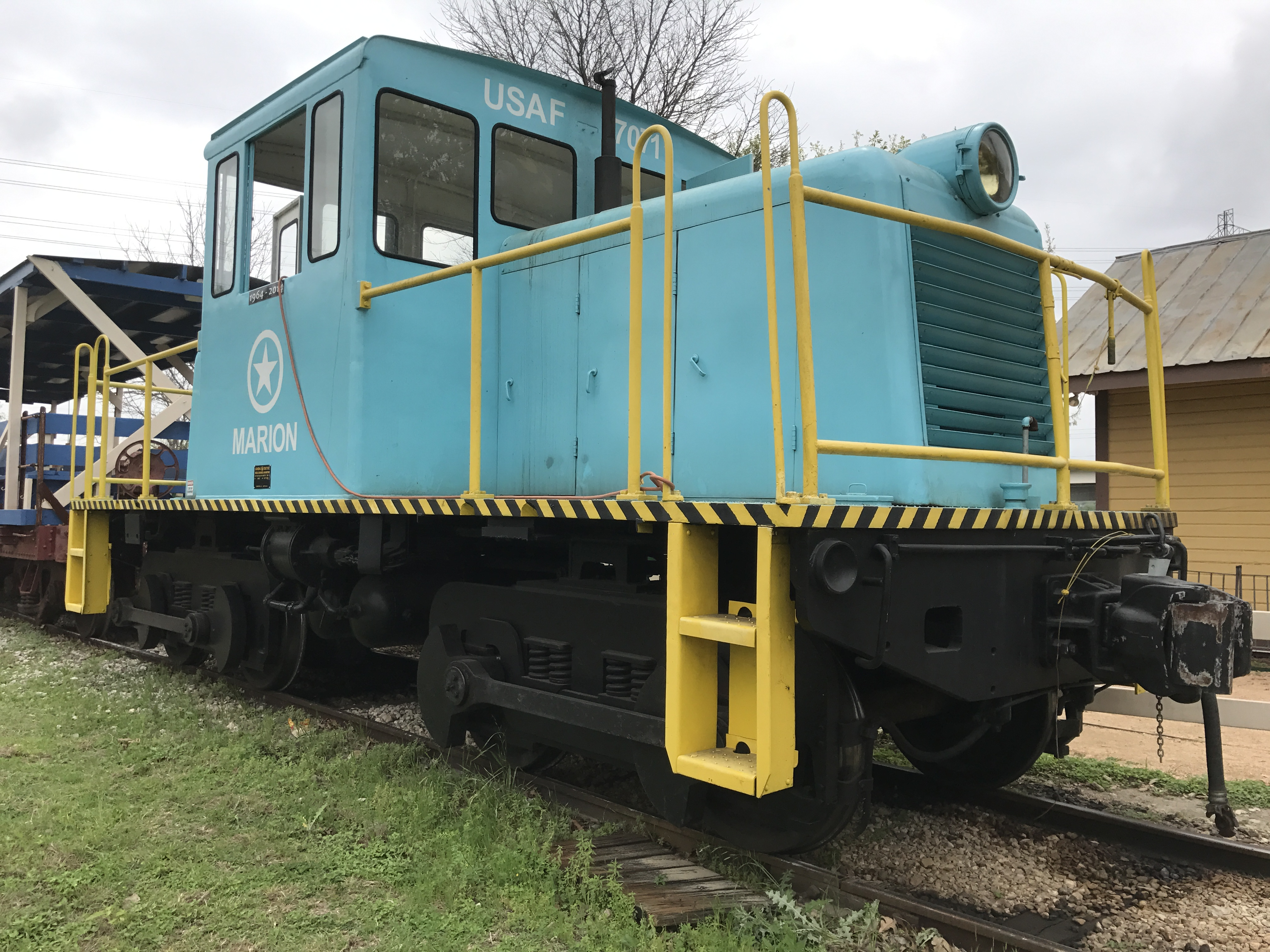
Former US Air Force 1942 GE 45-ton switcher #7071

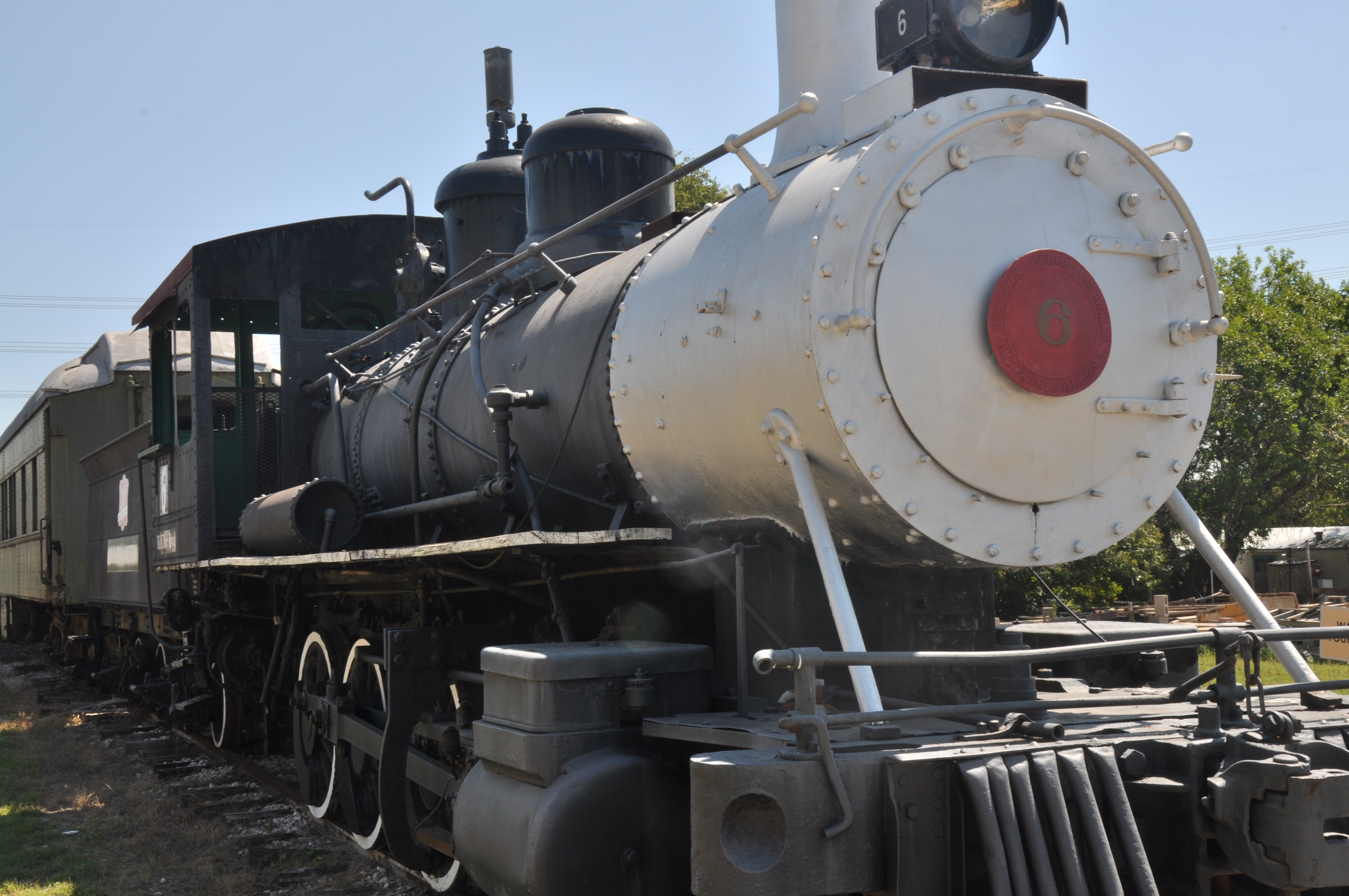
Former Moscow, Camden and San Augustine Railroad 1911 Baldwin 2-8-0 Steam Locomotive #6

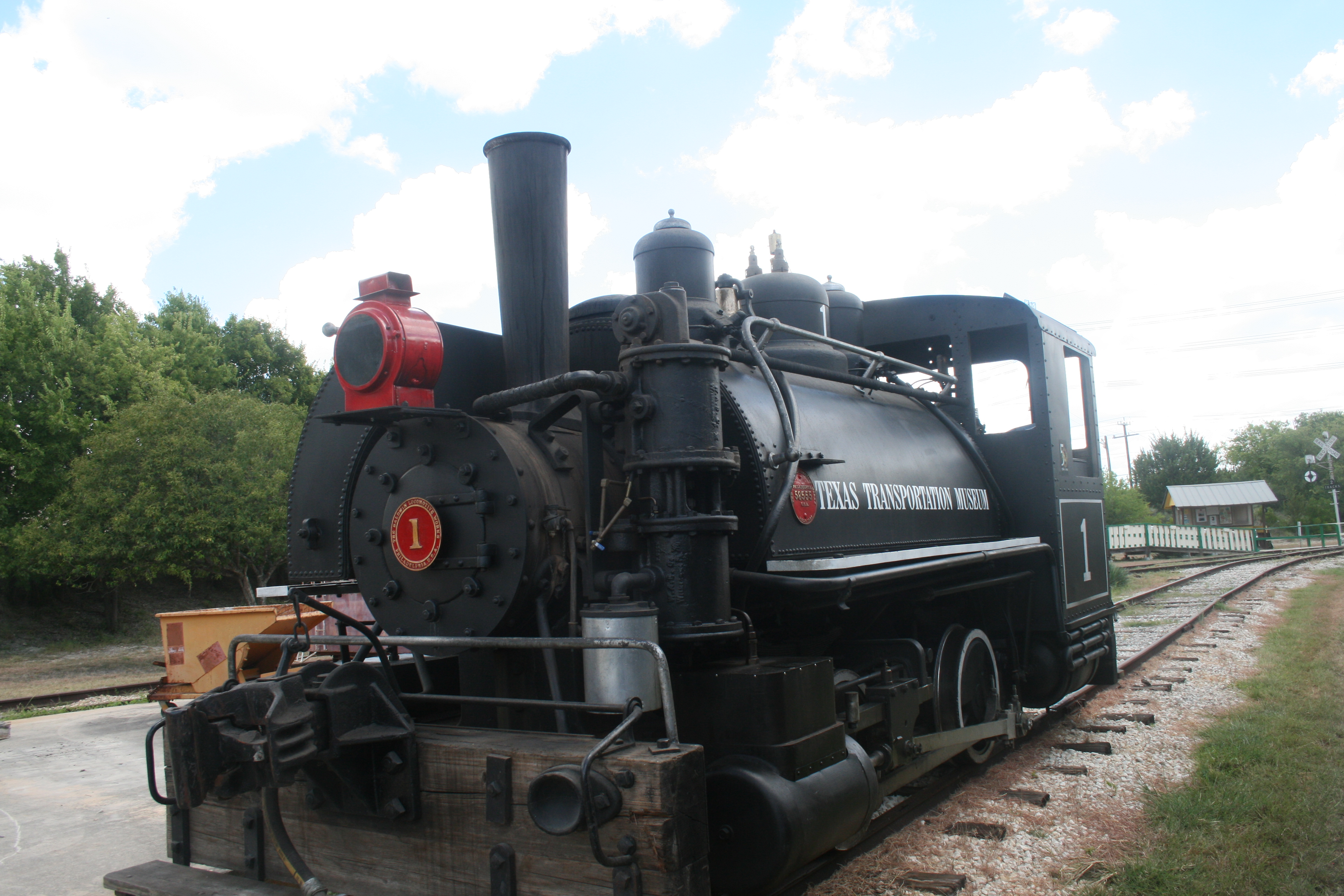
Former Comal Power Plant 1925 Baldwin 0-4-0T #1

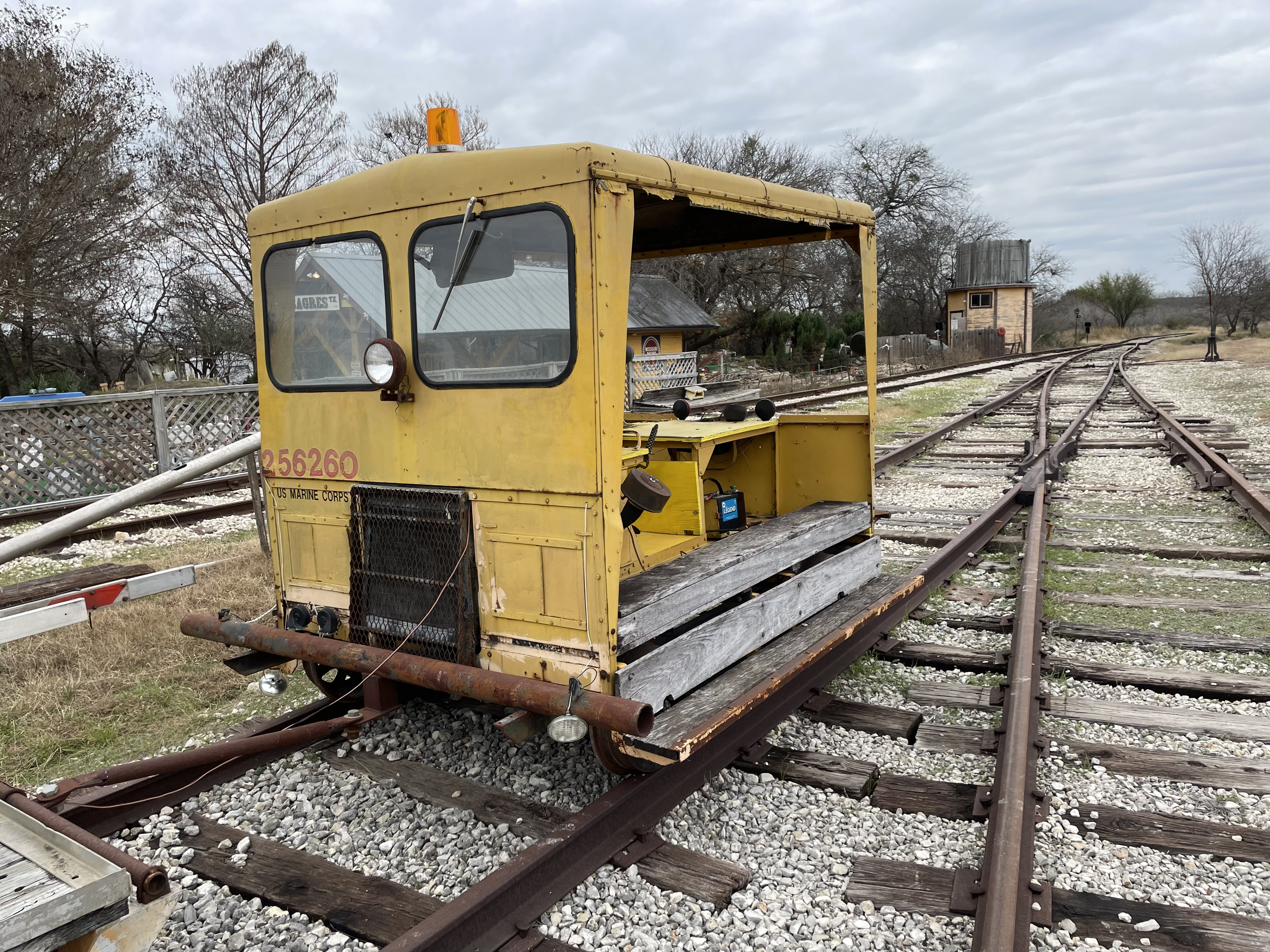
US Marine Corps Fairmont motor car #256260
