= Delta Valley and Southern 50 =

DV&S 50
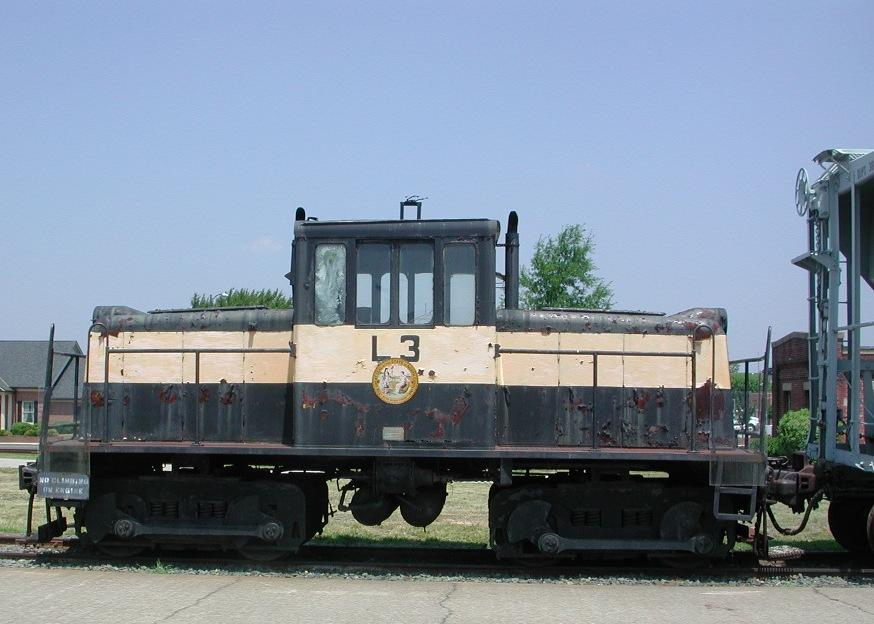
- A sister locomotive
Type and origin
- Power type: Diesel Electric
- Builder: General Electric
- Serial number: 32129
- Model: 45 ton
- Build date: May 1954
Specifications
- Configuration
  - AAR: B-B
  - UIC: B'B'
- Gauge: 4 ft 8 1/2 in (1,435 mm)
- Minimum curve: 50 ft (15 m)
- Adhesive weight: 45 short tons (41 t)
- Loco weight: 45 short tons (41 t)
- Fuel type: Diesel
- RPM range: 1800
- Displacement: 672 cubic inches (11 L)
- Traction motors: one on each truck side rod drive to second axle
- Cylinders: 6 in each of two engines
- Cylinder size: 4 7/8 in × 6 in (124 mm × 152 mm)
- Loco brake: Air
- Train brakes: Air
Performance figures
- Maximum speed: 20 mph (32 km/h)
- Power output: 2 x 150 hp (112 kW)
- Tractive effort: 27,000 lbf (120 kN)
Career
- Operators: Delta Valley & Southern
- Numbers: 50
- Last run: unknown
- Current owner: unknown
- Disposition: unknown
- Delta Valley & Southern Railway Locomotive #50
- U.S. National Register of Historic Places
- Area: less than one acre
- Built: 1954
- Architect: General Electric
- NRHP reference No.: 06001263
- Added to NRHP: January 24, 2007

Delta Valley and Southern 50 is a standard gauge diesel-electric locomotive built by General Electric in May, 1954, GE #32129 for the Delta Valley and Southern Railway. It replaced a small steam locomotive. It is of the type designated as a 45-ton, although the actual weight may be different from that. It is powered by two Cummins HBI-600 six-cylinder diesel prime movers, each of which drives a generator which, in turn, drives a single electric traction motor, one on each truck. The second axle on each truck is driven by a side rod.

The Delta Valley and Southern Railway, "DVS", in 1996 operated two miles of track from Delpro to Elkins, Arkansas, carrying about 600 cars a year. The line originally operated over 18.1 miles of track from Delpro to Tyronza, but was cut back in 1947. It was part of the St. Louis – San Francisco Railway (Frisco) for most of its life.

DV&S 50 was the only locomotive used on the railroad from 1954 until sold to Edwin Kessler. Burlington Northern Santa Fe accepted payment for delivery to Oklahoma City, but attempted to auctioned it there over a delivery dispute on May 6, 2009. Bidding closed May 26 without a winner. The locomotive was last seen running in Omaha, Nebraska on November 5, 2009. It is not known where the locomotive is now.

The locomotive was added to the National Register of Historic Places in 2007 as Delta Valley & Southern Railway Locomotive #50.

== Nomenclature ==
General Electric made a wide variety of small diesel electric locomotives for industrial and railroad use. These included:

- 44 ton. These were specifically designed to weigh less than 90,000 pounds and therefore could be operated by a single engineer, without a fireman, under the labor contracts of the time. They had two Caterpillar diesels, two four-wheel trucks, four traction motors, 400 horsepower, top speed of 35 mph, minimum radius of 125 feet, and were designed for use on branch lines of major railroads.
- 45 ton. These were designed for light industrial use. They had two Cummins diesels, two four-wheel trucks, one traction motor per truck, 300 horsepower, top speed of 20 mph, minimum radius of 50 feet, and were designed for industrial use with tight curves and clearances.
- 50 ton. These were a two-axle (four-wheel) configuration with a traction motor on each of the two axles. They had the same prime movers as the 45 ton, but a much lower and narrower body, designed to operate in steel mills and other very tight places at a top speed of 15 mph. The extra weight was ballast.
