= GE 45-ton switcher =

4-axle diesel locomotive

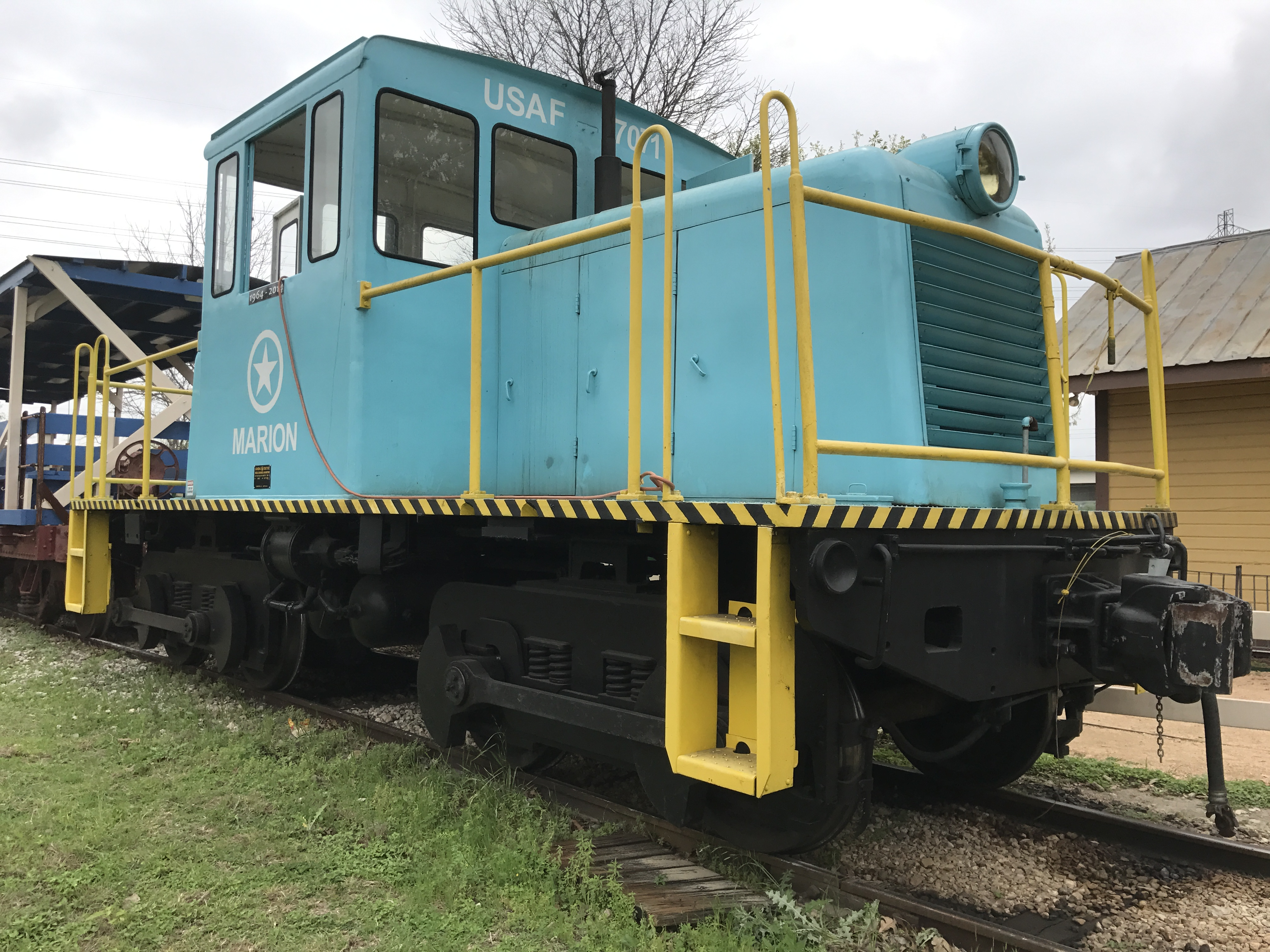
- GE 45-Ton (side rod driven) at the Texas Transportation Museum
Type and origin
- Power type: Diesel-electric
- Builder: GE Transportation Systems
- Model: 45-ton switcher
- Build date: April 1941–October 1956
Specifications
- Configuration
  - AAR: B-B
  - UIC: B′B′
- Gauge: 4 ft 8 1/2 in (1,435 mm)
- Minimum curve: 50 ft (15.24 m)
- Loco weight: 43 to 50 short tons (38 to 45 long tons; 39 to 45 t)
- Prime mover: two Cummins HBI-600 or 855NTC diesels in later models
- RPM range: 1,800 rpm (max)
- Aspiration: Normally aspirated
- Displacement: 672 cubic inches (11 L) or 855 cubic inches (14 L)
- Traction motors: Two, one per truck. Chain or side rod drive to second axle on each truck
- Cylinders: 6 per engine
- Cylinder size: 4 7/8 in × 6 in (123.825 mm × 152.400 mm)
- Loco brake: Air
- Train brakes: Air
Performance figures
- Maximum speed: 20 mph (32 km/h)
- Power output: 2 x 150 hp (112 kW)
- Tractive effort: 27,000 lbf (120 kN)

The GE 45-ton switcher is a 4-axle diesel locomotive built by General Electric between 1940 and 1956.

== Equipment ==
The locomotive was equipped with two 150 hp (110 kW) Cummins diesel engines, each driving a GE 1503 generator which, in turn, drove one of the two GE 733 traction motors, one per truck. In early models, the second axle on each truck was driven with side rods. Later models had chain drives inside the trucks that served the same purpose.

A traditional train air brake was optional, but all came with two compressors (one per engine) and a straight-air independent (locomotive) brake. The cabs were spacious for the size of the locomotive. Both the engineer's and fireman's seats were raised almost two feet on platforms (under which was the brake equipment, if applicable), to provide better visibility during switching.

== Uses ==
The GE 45-ton was extremely versatile and many variants existed. It has a high weight to power ratio and good traction, rated to be able to pull 20 loaded freight cars on level track. They were built with a short wheelbase for use in industrial plants, yards, and other places where clearances were tight. Although intended as switcher locomotives, they sometimes served mainline duties, although nearly all had an imposed speed limit of 20 mph (32 km/h) due to the double reduction gearing of their traction motors.

== Preserved examples ==
- Alberni Pacific Railway, The Alberni Pacific Railway in Port Alberni, BC Canada has one GE 45 Tonner that is used as a backup locomotive for their Heritage Railway operations over six miles of track from downtown Port Alberni to McLean Mill National Historic Site. The locomotive was originally built for the US Army in 1942 and later retired working for MacMillian Bloedel Ltd at their railyard in Port Alberni, BC.
- American Railcar Industries Inc., The railcar repair facility in Tennille, Georgia has one GE 45 Tonner that's used to switch their yard and to move railcars into and out of their repair shop. It is painted light blue with a white cab roof and black trucks. It has a white ARI company logo but has no number.
- Catskill Mountain Railroad, The in Kingston, NY has an early side rod 45 Tonner in service as both an MOW engine and a pusher for Polar Express and other large event consists.
- East Terminal Railway, The in Columbus, Ohio acquired one of these locomotives in August 2021, with plans to restore it to full operation and to use it as its primary service unit.
- Edmonton Transit also uses one of these locomotives, numbered 2010, for MOW tasks.
- Escanaba and Lake Superior Railroad, The operates the former White Pine Copper no 1 45-ton and uses it as their car shop switcher, alternating with other diesel locomotives.
- Fox River Trolley Museum of South Elgin, IL operates the Aurora, Elgin & Fox River Electric Company no. 5.
- Henry Ford Greenfield Village, The operates the former Naval Weapons Station Charleston No. 1, previously located at the base outside of Goose Creek, South Carolina. It is used to shuttle supplies for their steam locomotives from the Canadian National tracks to the village rails.
- Lake Superior And Mississippi railroad, The of Duluth, Minnesota owns and operates one.
- Lake Superior Railroad Museum, The has a former Minnesota Power 45-ton, which is now used for switching rolling stock around the museum.
- National Steel Car Limited in Hamilton Ontario currently owns four of these engines. Two are inactive, and two are used for moving all cars throughout the plant.
- Nevada Northern Railway, The owns one and is currently restoring it.
- North Carolina Transportation Museum, The operates North Carolina Ports Authority 45-ton No. L3
- Newport and Narragansett Bay Railroad, The operates two of these locomotives on a regular revenue basis.
- Northwest Railway Museum, has a side-rod equipped unit built in 1941 (#12981) for the U.S. Army Transportation Corps as #7320. It later performed naval shipyard switching duties in Washington State until retirement in 1976, when it was donated to Washington State Parks. The Northwest Railway Museum leased the locomotive and operated it until 1994; it is currently on static display at the Snoqualmie Depot. Formerly known as "Cecil the Diesel", a mascot for a museum membership program.
- Railroad Museum of New England, The / Naugatuck railroad owns a side-rod equipped 45-tonner which was built in 1942 (#15807) for the Rohm & Haas Chemical Co. as #RH-1. Donated 1993 by Cold Metal Products, it was repainted orange by RMNE and numbered 42, for its year of construction. Currently, the locomotive is stored out of service.
- Richmond Railroad Museum, The, operated by the Old Dominion Chapter, National Railway Historical Society, owns one that is located at its Hallsboro Yard site west of Richmond, Virginia. It was built in 1946 and purchased by the East Washington Railway in September of that year. It was retired in 1970 and sold to the Pinto Islands Metals Company in Mobile, Alabama, and for decades had been the plant switcher at the James River Cogeneration Company in Hopewell, VA. The plant was retired in 2019 and, following the plant's closing, the locomotive was acquired by the Richmond Railroad Museum. The locomotive itself was transported from the plant to the museum's satellite yard in Hallsboro, Virginia.
- Rochester & Genesee Valley Railroad Museum, The has restored former Rochester Gas & Electric 1941, a unit originally used by GE at River Works in Lynn, MA. It was donated to the museum in 1991 by Rochester Gas and Electric.
- Sioux City Railroad Museum, The owns and operates a former US Marine Corps 45-ton locomotive, painted in a Milwaukee Road paint scheme and numbered to #206.
- Railstar Corp. at Lowville, NY owns one in preparation of a tourist railroad startup.
- Southeastern Railway Museum, The operates a 50 ton ballasted unit built for the Anglo-Canadian Paper Company and which was later Hudson Bay Mining no. 101
- Southeastern Pennsylvania Transportation Authority, The (SEPTA) has one numbered LM-2 used as a maintenance of way (MOW) and rescue locomotive for its Broad Street subway line.
- South Carolina Railroad Museum, The has No 82, a side-rod 45-ton, built for and used at Naval Shipyard Charleston, South Carolina, prior to going to the museum. It is currently being restored to full operation.
- The Delta Valley and Southern 50 is listed on the National Register of Historic Places. Its present location is unknown.
- Texas Transportation Museum, The operates the former USAF 7071 45-ton and uses it on regular train rides, alternating with its other diesel locomotive.
- Walkersville Southern Railroad, The uses two as its primary service units, plus it acquired a third in 2021 that is presently under restoration. Number 4 (ex-USA 8538) and No. 9 (ex-USN 65-00439) are owned by Jamie Haislip, a volunteer on the WS. No. 45 (ex-US Army 7496)) was owned by Al Leyh who died in 2023, and since had his ashes spread on the railroad.
- Wanamaker, Kempton & Southern, The WK&S operates No. 7258, built for the US Army, it was acquired from Birdsboro Steel in 1997 and now serves as the primary power for the railroads excursions out of Kempton, Pennsylvania.

== Gallery ==
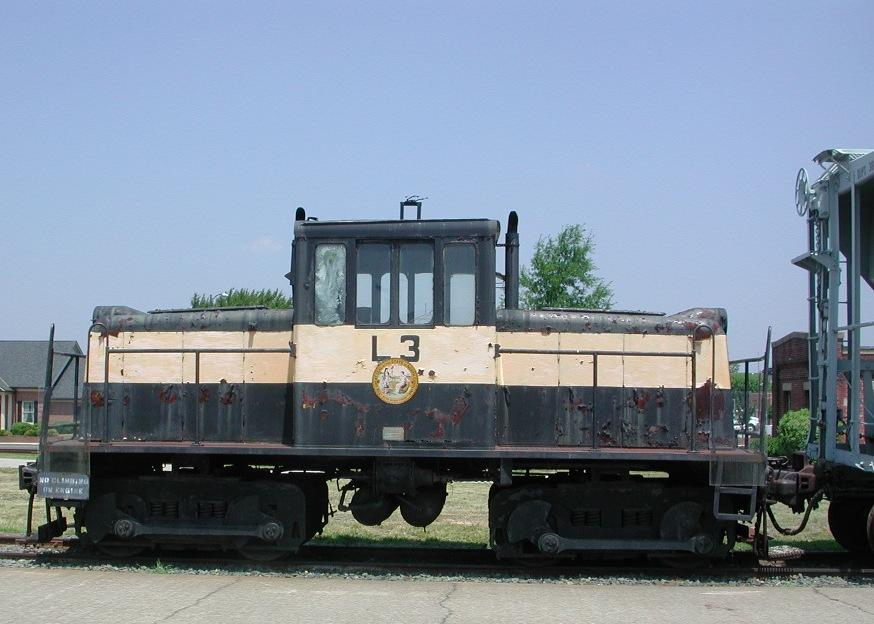
GE 45-ton switcher

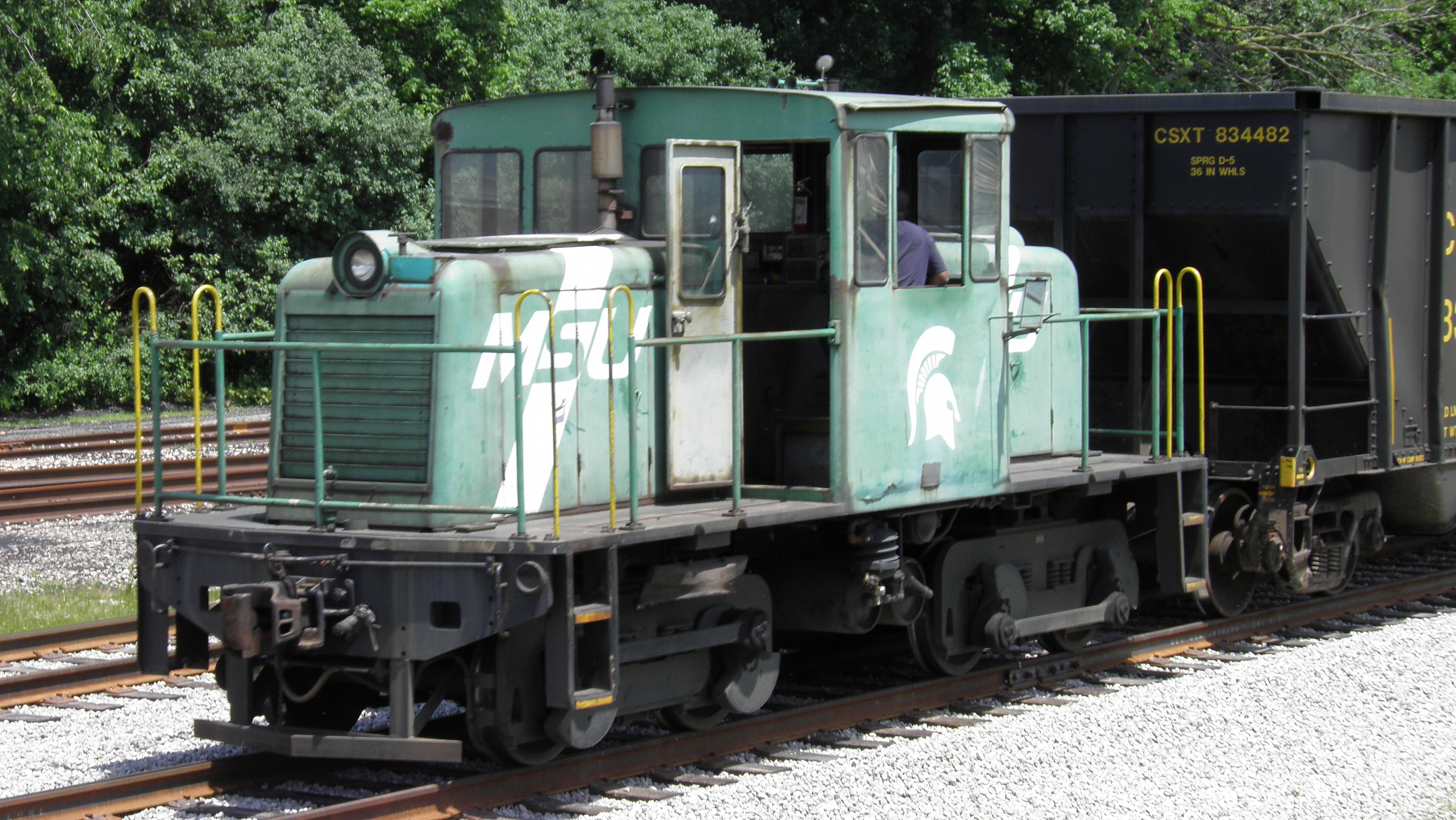
MSU's GE 45-ton Switcher positions coal cars for its power plant.

Control stand of a 1942 GE 45-ton switcher

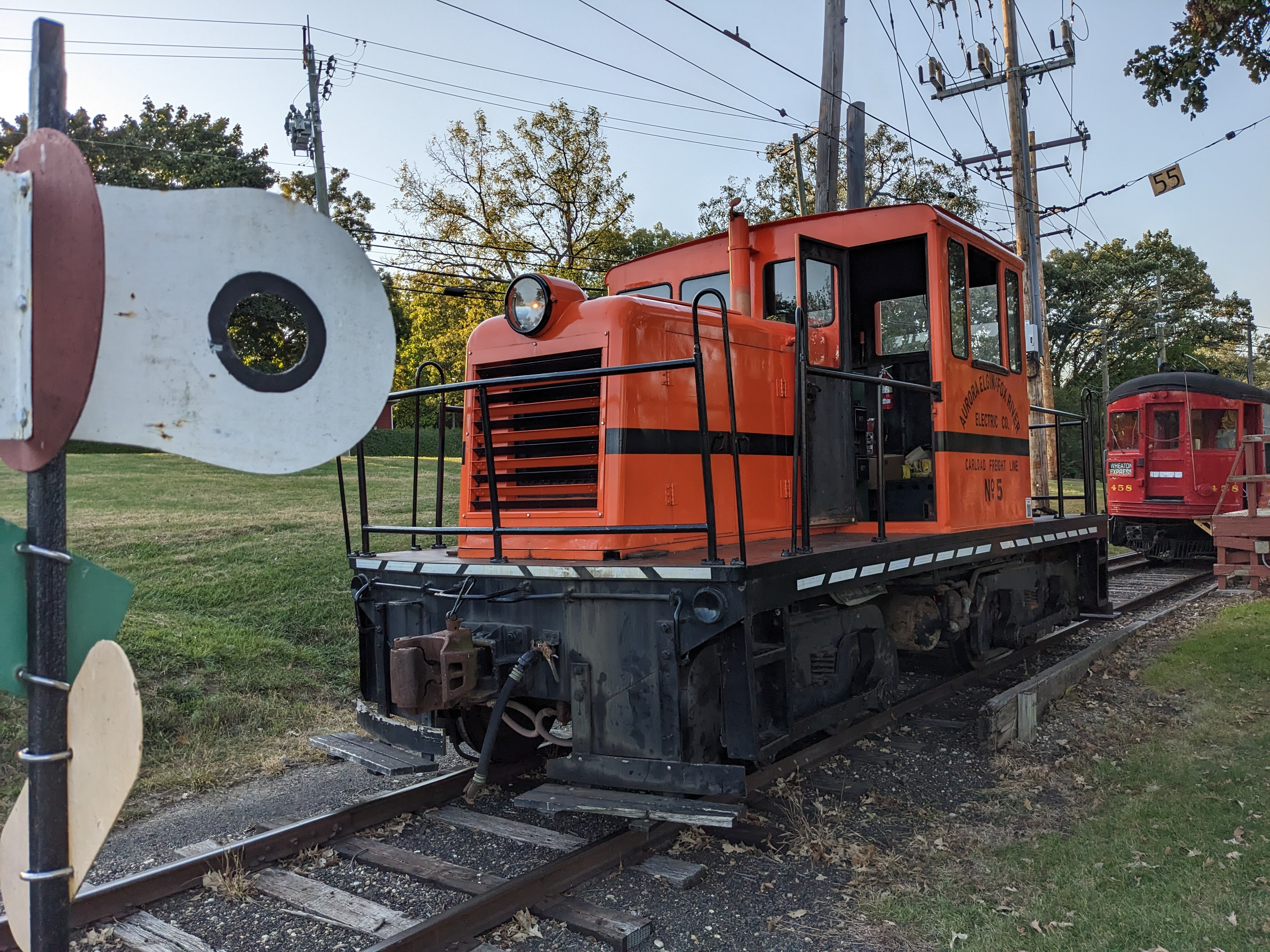
Aurora Elgin and Fox River Electric #5 at the Fox River Trolley Museum on October 5th, 2024.
