= Manila, Arkansas =

- City
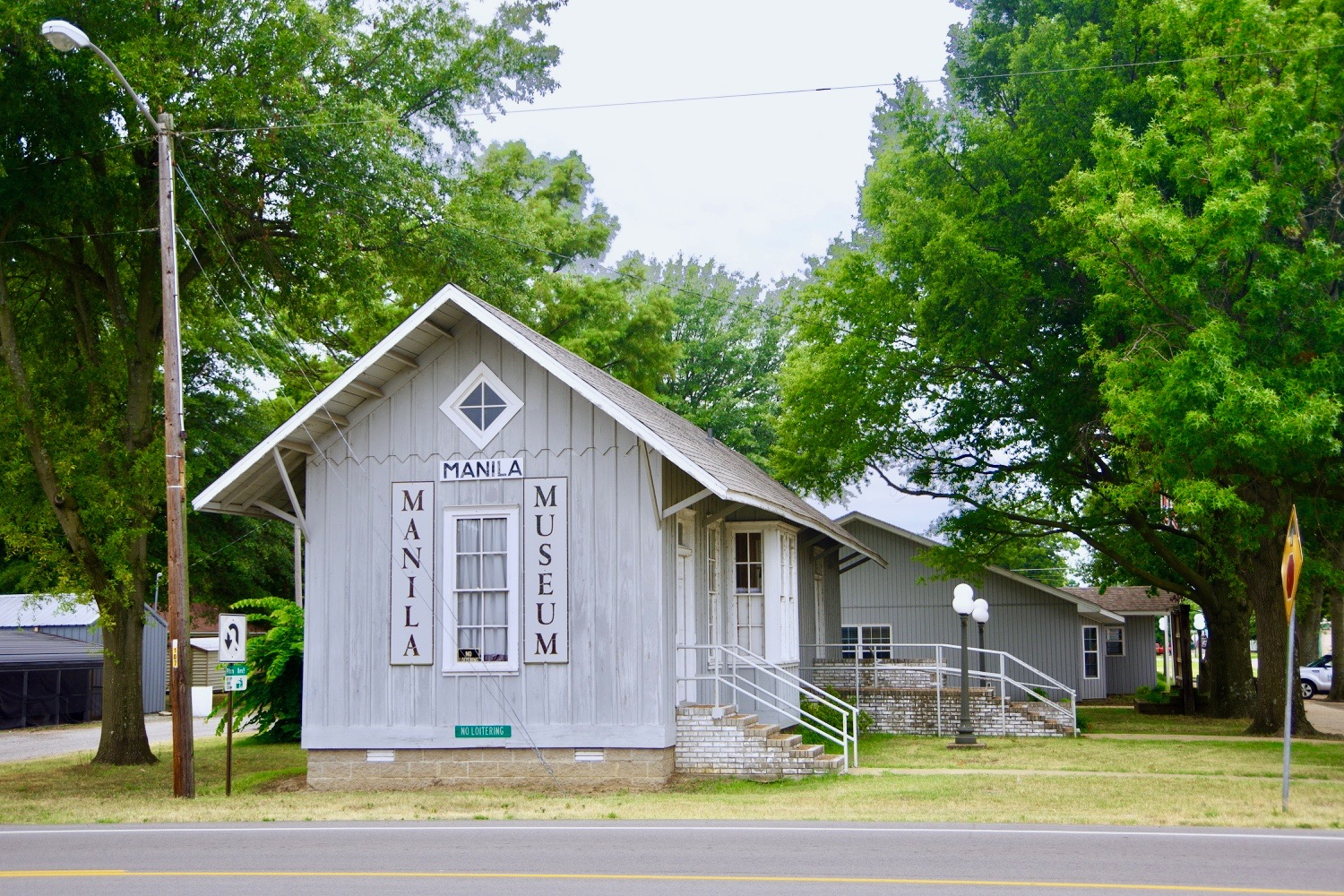
- Manila Depot Museum

- Location in Mississippi County, Arkansas
- Coordinates: 35°52′48″N 90°10′00″W
- Country: United States
- State: Arkansas
- County: Mississippi
- Named for: Manila, Philippines

Government
  - Mayor: Tracey Reinhart

Area
  - Total: 3.78 sq mi (9.78 km^{2})
  - Land: 3.78 sq mi (9.78 km^{2})
  - Water: 0 sq mi (0.00 km^{2})
- Elevation: 243 ft (74 m)

Population (2020)
  - Total: 3,682
  - Estimate (2025): 3,773 ▲
  - Density: 974.9/sq mi (376.43/km^{2})
- Time zone: UTC-6 (Central (CST))
  - Summer (DST): UTC-5 (CDT)
- ZIP code: 72442
- Area code: 870
- FIPS code: 05-43820
- GNIS feature ID: 2405008
- Website: www.manilaark.com

Manila is a city in Mississippi County, Arkansas, United States. The population was 3,682 at the 2020 census, up from 3,342 in 2010. It was the hometown of World War I sniper Herman Davis.

== History ==
Manila has its origins in a herdsman's camp established by John Needham in the late 1860s. By the late 1890s, a community known as "Cinda" (named after an early postmaster's sister) had developed in the area. In 1901, this community incorporated as a city, and chose the name "Manila" to honor Commodore George Dewey's 1898 victory in the Battle of Manila Bay during the Spanish–American War.

In the early 1900s, the Jonesboro, Lake City and Eastern Railroad (later part of the St. Louis-San Francisco Railway system) extended a rail line to Manila. In 1910, the Manila Depot was constructed by the railroad. This train station now serves as a museum, and is listed on the National Register of Historic Places.

In 1925, a memorial was established in the city for Herman Davis. The memorial was designated a state park in 1953, and the Arkansas Department of Parks and Tourism is responsible for its maintenance.

During the April 16, 1998 tornado outbreak, a 400 yard wide F4 tornado tracked into downtown Manila, killing 2 people and injuring 12 others.

== Geography ==
Manila is located in northwestern Mississippi County in the Arkansas Delta region. The city is situated at the intersection of Arkansas Highway 18 and Arkansas Highway 77, 9 miles (14 km) south of the Arkansas–Missouri state line. According to the United States Census Bureau, the city has a total area of 3.8 square miles (9.8 km^{2}), all land.

Ecologically, Manila is located within the St. Francis Lowlands ecoregion within the larger Mississippi Alluvial Plain. The St. Francis Lowlands are a flat region mostly covered with row crop agriculture today, though also containing sand blows and sunken lands remaining from the 1811–12 New Madrid earthquakes. Waterways have mostly been channelized, causing loss of aquatic and riparian wildlife habitat. The Big Lake National Wildlife Refuge, which preserves some of the bottomland hardwood forest typical of this ecoregion prior to development for row agriculture lies just east of Manila.

== Demographics ==
Historical population
| Census | Pop. | Note | %± |
|---|---|---|---|
| 1910 | 562 | | — |
| 1920 | 971 | | 72.8% |
| 1930 | 1,226 | | 26.3% |
| 1940 | 1,248 | | 1.8% |
| 1950 | 1,729 | | 38.5% |
| 1960 | 1,753 | | 1.4% |
| 1970 | 1,961 | | 11.9% |
| 1980 | 2,553 | | 30.2% |
| 1990 | 2,635 | | 3.2% |
| 2000 | 3,055 | | 15.9% |
| 2010 | 3,342 | | 9.4% |
| 2020 | 3,682 | | 10.2% |
| 2025 (est.) | 3,773 | ▲ | 2.5% |
U.S. Decennial Census

=== 2020 census ===
As of the 2020 census, Manila had a population of 3,682, with 1,410 households and 863 families residing in the city.

The median age was 36.6 years. 26.3% of residents were under the age of 18 and 14.4% were 65 years of age or older. For every 100 females there were 92.4 males, and for every 100 females age 18 and over there were 86.6 males age 18 and over.

There were 1,410 households, of which 37.1% had children under the age of 18 living in them. Of all households, 48.2% were married-couple households, 17.1% were households with a male householder and no spouse or partner present, and 28.2% were households with a female householder and no spouse or partner present. About 26.9% of all households were made up of individuals and 11.9% had someone living alone who was 65 years of age or older.

There were 1,583 housing units, of which 10.9% were vacant. The homeowner vacancy rate was 5.1% and the rental vacancy rate was 9.2%.

0.0% of residents lived in urban areas, while 100.0% lived in rural areas.

Manila racial composition
| Race | Number | Percentage |
|---|---|---|
| White (non-Hispanic) | 3,380 | 91.8% |
| Black or African American (non-Hispanic) | 21 | 0.57% |
| Native American | 6 | 0.16% |
| Asian | 18 | 0.49% |
| Other/Mixed | 116 | 3.15% |
| Hispanic or Latino | 141 | 3.83% |

=== 2000 census ===
As of the census of 2000, there were 3,055 people, 1,214 households, and 842 families residing in the city. The population density was 946.2 inhabitants per square mile (365.3/km^{2}). There were 1,304 housing units at an average density of 403.9 per square mile (155.9/km^{2}). The racial makeup of the city was 98.20% White, 0.03% Black or African American, 0.39% Native American, 0.07% Asian, 0.26% from other races, and 1.05% from two or more races. 1.08% of the population were Hispanic or Latino of any race.

There were 1,214 households, out of which 34.1% had children under the age of 18 living with them, 55.8% were married couples living together, 10.0% had a female householder with no husband present, and 30.6% were non-families. 27.4% of all households were made up of individuals, and 14.6% had someone living alone who was 65 years of age or older. The average household size was 2.47 and the average family size was 3.02.

In the city, the population was spread out, with 25.9% under the age of 18, 8.6% from 18 to 24, 28.0% from 25 to 44, 21.6% from 45 to 64, and 15.9% who were 65 years of age or older. The median age was 36 years. For every 100 females, there were 89.3 males. For every 100 females age 18 and over, there were 85.6 males.

The median income for a household in the city was $24,896, and the median income for a family was $33,105. Males had a median income of $31,344 versus $19,063 for females. The per capita income for the city was $13,754. About 13.4% of families and 18.4% of the population were below the poverty line, including 18.6% of those under age 18 and 26.4% of those age 65 or over.

== Transportation ==
The Manila Municipal Airport (IATA: MXA, ICAO: KMXA, FAA LID: MXA) is a public-use airport located two nautical miles (4 km) northeast of the central business district of Manila, in Mississippi County, Arkansas, United States. It is owned by the City of Manila.

== Climate ==
The climate in this area is characterized by hot, humid summers and generally mild to cool winters. According to the Köppen Climate Classification system, Manila has a humid subtropical climate, abbreviated "Cfa" on climate maps.

== Notable people ==
- Cloria Brown, Missouri state legislator
- Honey Bruce, stripper and showgirl
- Herman Davis, World War I sniper
- Jerry Jaye, singer
- Wayne Wagner, state legislator and mayor
- Mel Wright, baseball player and coach
