= Robert E. Lee Wilson =

American businessman and plantation owner (1865–1933)

- Born: March 5, 1865; Frenchman's Bayou, Arkansas
- Died: September 27, 1933 (aged 68)
- Resting place: Wilson town square 35°34′7″N 90°2′33″W
- Occupations: Owner of Lee Wilson & Company, plantation owner, railroad builder, logger
- Years active: 1886–1933
- Known for: Lee Wilson & Company
- Successor: Robert E. Lee Wilson, Jr. James H. Crain
- Board member of: Arkansas State Highway Commission; Arkansas State University
- Spouse: Elizabeth Beall
- Parent(s): Josiah Wilson; Martha Parsons Wilson

Robert Edward Lee Wilson (March 5, 1865 – September 27, 1933) was the creator and owner of Lee Wilson and Company, a group of large cotton plantations in Mississippi County, Arkansas. Acquiring much of his father's former swamplands, Wilson formed a logging and farming business that would become one of the largest and most successful in the United States.

== Personal History ==
Wilson was born to Josiah Wilson and Martha Parsons Wilson on a rural plantation in Mississippi County in 1865. Robert's father died without a proper will, so his heirs fought over estate after Josiah Wilson's death in 1870. Wilson went to court in 1878 to declare himself "emancipated" at the age of 17 so as to be able to lay a proper legal claim to a part of his father's estate.

Besides his agricultural holdings, in 1908, Wilson founded a bank in Mississippi County. This bank helped his companies to weather the worst of the Great Depression.

== Lee Wilson & Company ==
In 1882, Wilson started a lumber business with his father-in-law, the Wilson & Beall Lumber Company. As the company cleared the land of timber, it transitioned to an agricultural business. In 1904, Wilson founded Lee Wilson & Company to oversee the vast agricultural holding he had amassed. He employed the sharecropping system to operate thousands of acres of land in Mississippi County.

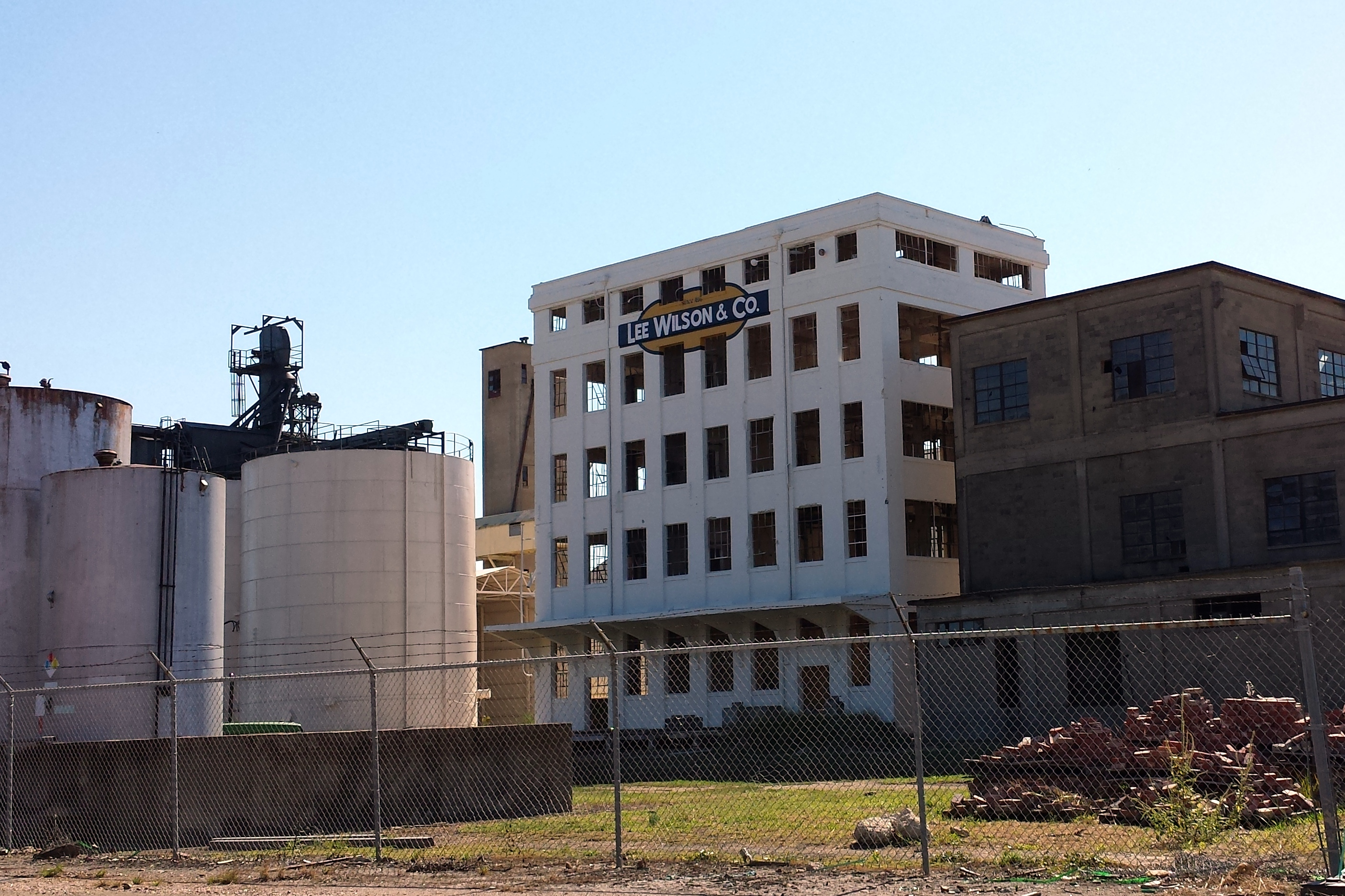
Lee Wilson & Company cotton storage and processing building in Wilson, AR

Wilson founded many company towns for his workers, including Armorel, Keiser, Marie, Victoria, and Wilson, and was one of the most influential Arkansans of his time. A period company brochure claims the Wilson & Company grounds to be the world's largest plantation.

A proponent of President Roosevelt's Agricultural Adjustment Administration, Wilson used his political connections to secure federal help for his cotton business during the Great Depression. In 1935, Lee Wilson & Company was the single largest recipient of Agricultural Adjustment Administration funds of any farming company or operation in America.
