= Turrell =

Turrell may refer to

- Margaret Hoberg Turrell, composer
- Turrell, Arkansas, a city in the United States
  - Turrell School District
  - Old Turrell City Hall
- Salmon Turrell Farmstead, a historic home and farm in Indiana, U.S.
- Turrell (name)
- Smoove & Turrell, a British musical group
- Accles-Turrell, an English automobile built c.1900
