= Crawfordsville, Arkansas =

- Town
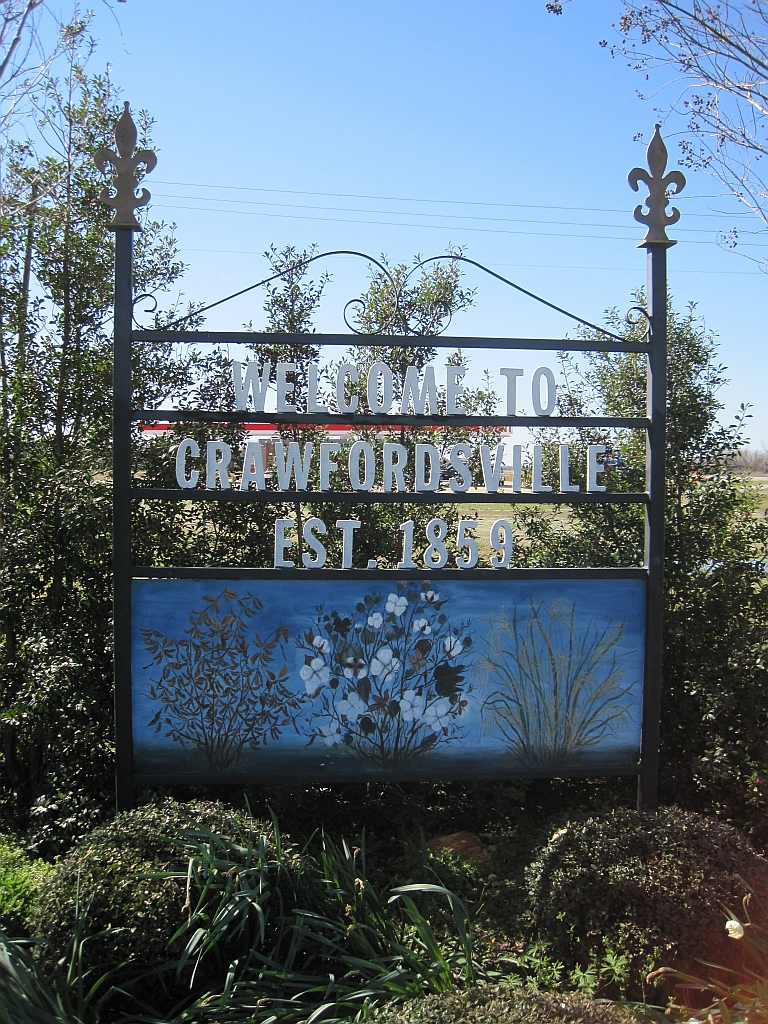

- Location of Crawfordsville in Crittenden County, Arkansas.
- Coordinates: 35°13′36″N 90°19′27″W
- Country: United States
- State: Arkansas
- County: Crittenden

Area
  - Total: 0.56 sq mi (1.45 km^{2})
  - Land: 0.56 sq mi (1.45 km^{2})
  - Water: 0 sq mi (0.00 km^{2})
- Elevation: 220 ft (67 m)

Population (2020)
  - Total: 462
  - Estimate (2025): 443 ▼
  - Density: 826.6/sq mi (319.16/km^{2})
- Time zone: UTC-6 (Central (CST))
  - Summer (DST): UTC-5 (CDT)
- ZIP code: 72327
- Area code: 870
- FIPS code: 05-15940
- GNIS feature ID: 2406334

Crawfordsville, historically Crawfordville, is a town in Crittenden County, Arkansas, United States. The population was 462 at the 2020 census.

== Geography ==
Crawfordsville is located near the center of Crittenden County. According to the United States Census Bureau, Crawfordsville has a total area of 0.58 square miles (1.5 km^{2}), all land.

Ecologically, Crawfordsville is located within the Northern Backswamps ecoregion within the larger Mississippi Alluvial Plain. The Northern Backswamps are a network of low-lying overflow areas and floodplains historically dominated by bald cypress, water tupelo, overcup oak, water hickory, and Nuttall oak forest subject to year-round or seasonal inundation. The Wapanocca National Wildlife Refuge, which preserves some of the year-round flooded bald cypress forest typical of this ecoregion prior to development for row agriculture lies northeast of Crawfordsville.

U.S. Route 64 passes just north of the town, leading east 8 miles (13 km) to Marion and 19 miles (31 km) to Memphis, Tennessee, and west 9 miles (14 km) to Earle.

== Demographics ==
Historical population
Census	Pop.	Note	%±
1920	605		—
1930	612		1.2%
1940	656		7.2%
1950	680		3.7%
1960	744		9.4%
1970	831		11.7%
1980	685		−17.6%
1990	617		−9.9%
2000	514		−16.7%
2010	479		−6.8%
2020	462		−3.5%
2025 (est.)	443	▼	−4.1%
U.S. Decennial Census; 2018 Estimate

As of the census of 2000, there were 514 people, 202 households, and 142 families residing in the town. The population density was 451.0 people/km^{2} (1,168 people/mi^{2}). There were 222 housing units at an average density of 194.8 units/km^{2} (505 units/mi^{2}). The racial makeup of the town was 49.81% White, 49.42% Black or African American, 0.19% Asian, and 0.58% from two or more races. 1.17% of the population were Hispanic or Latino of any race.

There were 202 households, out of which 29.7% had children under the age of 18 living with them, 42.1% were married couples living together, 22.3% had a female householder with no husband present, and 29.7% were non-families. 27.7% of all households were made up of individuals, and 13.4% had someone living alone who was 65 years of age or older. The average household size was 2.54 and the average family size was 3.12.

In the town, the population was spread out, with 27.0% under the age of 18, 8.8% from 18 to 24, 27.0% from 25 to 44, 23.9% from 45 to 64, and 13.2% who were 65 years of age or older. The median age was 37 years. For every 100 females, there were 89.7 males. For every 100 females age 18 and over, there were 91.3 males.

The median income for a household in the town was $26,518, and the median income for a family was $31,667. Males had a median income of $31,250 versus $19,205 for females. The per capita income for the town was $12,176. About 19.4% of families and 21.1% of the population were below the poverty line, including 27.9% of those under age 18 and 16.4% of those age 65 or over.

== Education ==
Marion School District, including Marion High School, serves Crawfordsville. On July 1, 2004, the Crawfordsville School District consolidated into the Marion School District.

== Notable people ==
- Fred Smith, member of the Arkansas House of Representatives
- James C. Taylor, Illinois state legislator; born in Crawfordsville
- Johnnie Taylor, singer; born in Crawfordsville
