= Stan Adams =

American football player (born 1960)

No. 59
- Position: Linebacker

Personal information
- Born: May 22, 1960 (age 66); Marion, Arkansas, U.S.
- Listed height: 6 ft 2 in (1.88 m)
- Listed weight: 215 lb (98 kg)

Career information
- High school: Marion
- College: Memphis (1978–1982)

Career history
- Los Angeles Raiders (1982–1985); Minnesota Vikings (1986)*
- * Offseason or practice squad member only

Awards and highlights
- Super Bowl champion (XVIII)

Career NFL statistics
- Games played: 4
- Stats at Pro Football Reference

Stanley Earl Adams (born May 22, 1960) is an American former professional football player who was a linebacker in the National Football League (NFL). He played college football for the Memphis Tigers before playing for the Los Angeles Raiders of the NFL in the 1980s.

== Early life ==
Adams grew up in Jericho, Arkansas, and attended Marion High School in Marion, Arkansas.

== College career ==
In 1978, Adams joined Memphis State University, where he played for the Tigers, first as an end and then as a linebacker during his senior year.

== Professional career ==
After going undrafted in the 1982 NFL draft, Adams signed with the Raiders as a free agent. He spent the next two seasons on the injury reserve list; in 1982 with a bruised chest and 1983 with torn knee cartilage. In 1983, he was awarded a championship ring following the Raiders' win against the Washington Redskins in Super Bowl XVIII. Adams made his professional debut during the 1984 season and appeared in four games, including three starts. He was named a starter at the beginning of the season, following the retirement of Ted Hendricks, but missed most of the season due to a knee injury.

In July 1986, he signed with the Minnesota Vikings as a free agent but left the team prior to the start of the season.
