= Christene Brownlee =

American politician

Christene Jackson Brownlee (born October 16, 1955) is an American politician. She was formerly the mayor of Gilmore, Arkansas and a former state legislator in Arkansas. She switched parties to become a member of the Republican Party; she served in the Arkansas House of Representatives from 1991 to 1994.

She graduated from Turrell High School in 1973.
