= Marion High School (Arkansas) =

Location
- 1 Patriot Drive; Marion, Arkansas 72364; United States; 35°11′42″N 90°11′47″W

Information
- Type: Comprehensive
- Established: 1911 (115 years ago)
- School district: Marion School District
- CEEB code: 041560
- NCES School ID: 050939000682
- Principal: Emily Hall
- Teaching staff: 88.82 (on FTE basis)
- Grades: 10–12
- Enrollment: 904 (2023–2024)
- Student to teacher ratio: 10.18
- Campus: Suburban
- Colors: Red, white, and blue
- Mascot: Patriots
- Rivals: West Memphis High School
- Website: www.msd3.org/o/mhs

Marion High School is an accredited public high school in Marion, Arkansas, United States. Established in 1911, Marion High School is one of four public high schools in Crittenden County and the only high school of the Marion School District.

The school district, and therefore the high school's attendance boundary, includes almost all of Marion, the municipalities of Clarkedale, Crawfordsville, Gilmore, Jericho, Sunset, Turrell, and portions of Jennette and West Memphis. It is one of the few remaining schools in the United States & the world at large that still practices Corporal Punishment.

== History ==
The first Marion High School began in 1911 with construction of its first building completed in 1912 and housed all grades and then subsequently served solely as a high school and later as a middle school until the 1990s.

In recent years the Marion School District has absorbed students from smaller nearby districts due to state mandated consolidation—most recently Crawfordsville School District (2004) and Turrell School District (2010). Previous consolidations and expansions added the communities of Jericho (1947), a small portion of adjacent West Memphis (1953) and with integration Sunset (1968). The current facility dates from 1970, but Marion's schools were founded in 1869 and the first High School opened in 1911. The school averages between 850 and 900 students in grades 10–12.

=== Campus ===
Marion High School is located on a 2-acre (0.81 ha) campus adjacent to Interstate 55 and immediately north of Marion Junior High School. The campus is a series of buildings arranged around a plaza.

The main building houses nineteen teaching spaces including a suite of rooms for family and consumer science; the media center; faculty lounge/workroom; administrative offices; and a reception area for visitors. A seismic upgrade was completed on the main building in 2006 to enhance earthquake preparedness.

Separate buildings are maintained for Arts & Sciences, Band, Building Trades, Food Services, Humanities, Special Education and the In-school suspension program.

=== Athletic facilities ===
The gymnasium can seat approximately 1,000 people on foldaway bleachers and includes two classroom spaces for junior high choir and health classes.

East of the main campus is a 3500-seat football stadium completed in 1993. The seating capacity was raised in 2005 to 5000 upon entry to the newly formed 6A conference. The football field is encircled by a urethane running track. The campus also includes a baseball field, tennis courts and an indoor practice building for football.

With the completion of the new Marion Junior High School in 2009, the unofficially named "Patriot Arena" opened for basketball games for both MJHS and MHS. The front lobby of the facility is surrounded by glass panes and the facility itself has many aesthetic touches that make it unique. The arena can seat multiple volumes of people including 1600, 1900 in 2 different configurations, and 2200. This new capacity, state-of-the-art sound system, and the building's design and aesthetics marked a huge upgrade from the 1,000 seat gym on the campus of MHS and made it a statewide destination to play basketball. Marion High School hosted the 2011 6A State Basketball Tournament in the arena and the 2011 6A State Baseball Tournament at adjacent John Robbins Field.

== Academics ==
The assumed course of study follows the Smart Core curriculum developed by the Arkansas Department of Education (ADE). Students complete regular coursework and exams and may select Advanced Placement (AP) courses and exams that may lead to college credit. AP classes are offered in English, Mathematics, Science and Social Studies. Students are also afforded concurrent enrollment at Mid-South Community College in nearby West Memphis. College credits from this program are accepted for transfer to all state colleges and universities in Arkansas. Twenty-four credits are required for graduation.

Marion High School is accredited by the ADE and has been accredited by AdvancED (formerly North Central Association) since 1930.

== Athletics ==
The Marion High School mascot is the Patriot with red, white and blue serving as the school colors.

For 2012–14, the Marion Patriots compete in the 6A Classification—the state's second largest—in the 7A/6A East Conference administered by the Arkansas Activities Association. The Patriots may participate in basketball, football, tennis, track, cross country, baseball, softball, volleyball, soccer and golf.

== Notable alumni ==
The following are notable alumni of Marion High School. The number in parentheses indicates the year of graduation.

- Barrett Baber— The Voice winner
- Ray Brown—professional football coach and former professional football player
- Jerry Franklin (2007)—professional football player
- Abbey Smith— Grammy-winning singer, commonly known by her stage name YEBBA
