= Gilmore, Arkansas =

- City
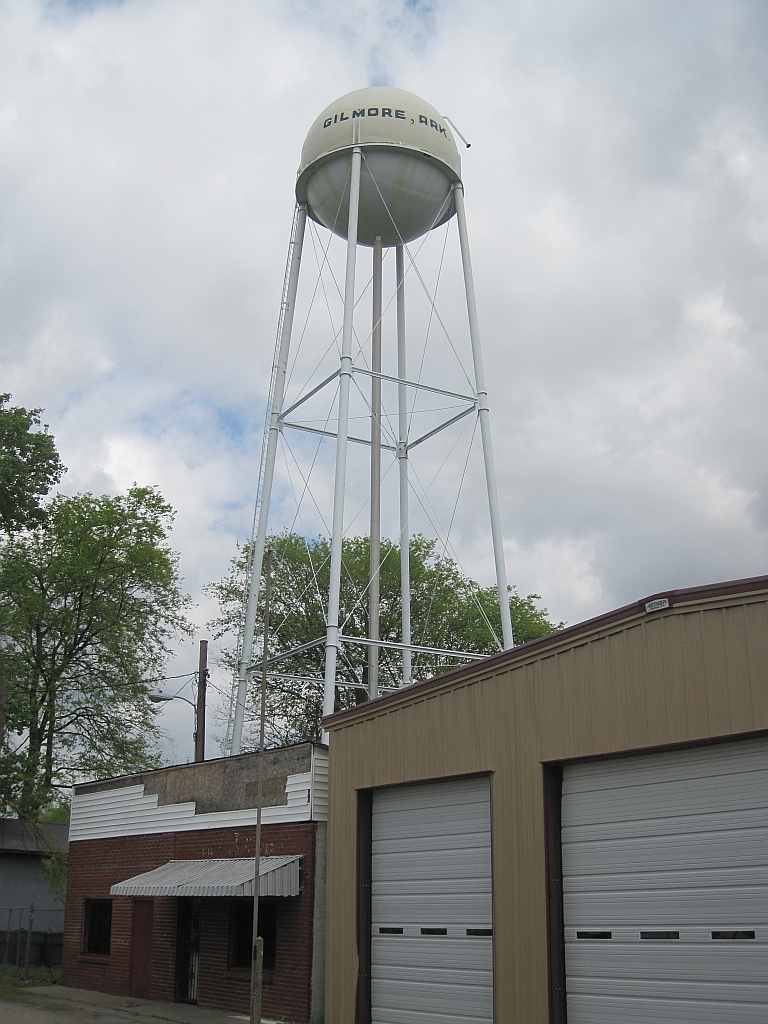

- Location of Gilmore in Crittenden County, Arkansas.
- Coordinates: 35°24′52″N 90°16′40″W
- Country: United States
- State: Arkansas
- County: Crittenden

Area
  - Total: 13.54 sq mi (35.07 km^{2})
  - Land: 13.52 sq mi (35.01 km^{2})
  - Water: 0.027 sq mi (0.07 km^{2})
- Elevation: 220 ft (67 m)

Population (2020)
  - Total: 176
  - Estimate (2025): 172 ▼
  - Density: 13.0/sq mi (5.03/km^{2})
- Time zone: UTC-6 (Central (CST))
  - Summer (DST): UTC-5 (CDT)
- ZIP code: 72339
- Area code: 870
- FIPS code: 05-27040
- GNIS feature ID: 2403698

Gilmore is a city in Crittenden County, Arkansas, United States. Per the 2020 census, the population was 176.

== Geography ==
Gilmore is located in northern Crittenden County and is bordered to the south by the city of Turrell. Interstate 555 (I-555) pass through the west part of Gilmore, leading northwest 44 miles (71 km) to Jonesboro and south 20 miles (32 km) via I-55 to West Memphis. According to the United States Census Bureau, Gilmore has a total area of 0.23 square miles (0.6 km^{2}), all land.

Ecologically, Gilmore is located within the Northern Backswamps ecoregion within the larger Mississippi Alluvial Plain. The Northern Backswamps are a network of low-lying overflow areas and floodplains historically dominated by bald cypress, water tupelo, overcup oak, water hickory, and Nuttall oak forest subject to year-round or seasonal inundation. The Wapanocca National Wildlife Refuge, which preserves some of the year-round flooded bald cypress forest typical of this ecoregion prior to development for row agriculture lies southeast of Gilmore.

== Demographics ==
Historical population
Census	Pop.	Note	%±
1960	438		—
1970	461		5.3%
1980	503		9.1%
1990	331		−34.2%
2000	292		−11.8%
2010	188		−35.6%
2020	176		−6.4%
2025 (est.)	172	▼	−2.3%
U.S. Decennial Census; 2010 2020

=== Racial and ethnic composition ===
Gilmore city, Arkansas – Racial and ethnic composition Note: the US Census treats Hispanic/Latino as an ethnic category. This table excludes Latinos from the racial categories and assigns them to a separate category. Hispanics/Latinos may be of any race.
Race / Ethnicity (NH = Non-Hispanic)	Pop 2000	Pop 2010	Pop 2020	% 2000	% 2010	% 2020
White alone (NH)	58	42	51	19.86%	22.34%	28.98%
Black or African American alone (NH)	231	144	102	79.11%	76.60%	57.95%
Native American or Alaska Native alone (NH)	0	0	0	0.00%	0.00%	0.00%
Asian alone (NH)	0	0	0	0.00%	0.00%	0.00%
Native Hawaiian or Pacific Islander alone (NH)	0	0	0	0.00%	0.00%	0.00%
Other race alone (NH)	2	0	0	0.68%	0.00%	0.00%
Mixed race or Multiracial (NH)	1	0	5	0.34%	0.00%	2.84%
Hispanic or Latino (any race)	0	2	18	0.00%	1.06%	10.23%
Total	292	188	176	100.00%	100.00%	100.00%

=== 2000 Census ===
As of the census of 2000, there were 292 people, 100 households, and 78 families residing in the town. The population density was 512.5 people/km^{2} (1,327 people/mi^{2}). There were 114 housing units at an average density of 200.1 units/km^{2} (518 units/mi^{2}). The racial makeup of the town was 19.86% White, 79.11% Black or African American, 0.68% from other races, and 0.34% from two or more races.

There were 100 households, out of which 38.0% had children under the age of 18 living with them, 43.0% were married couples living together, 31.0% had a female householder with no husband present, and 22.0% were non-families. 22.0% of all households were made up of individuals, and 8.0% had someone living alone who was 65 years of age or older. The average household size was 2.92 and the average family size was 3.38.

In the town the population was spread out, with 35.3% under the age of 18, 9.9% from 18 to 24, 24.3% from 25 to 44, 19.9% from 45 to 64, and 10.6% who were 65 years of age or older. The median age was 30 years. For every 100 females, there were 105.6 males. For every 100 females age 18 and over, there were 83.5 males.

The median income for a household in the town was $20,625, and the median income for a family was $22,031. Males had a median income of $29,375 versus $18,000 for females. The per capita income for the town was $8,867. About 29.1% of families and 38.6% of the population were below the poverty line, including 52.2% of those under the age of eighteen and 44.8% of those 65 or over.

== Education ==
Gilmore is in the Marion School District. Its comprehensive high school is Marion High School.

Gilmore was formerly in the Turrell School District. On July 1, 2010, the former Turrell district consolidated with the Marion School District, thus closing the former Turrell High School.
