= Marion, Arkansas =

- City
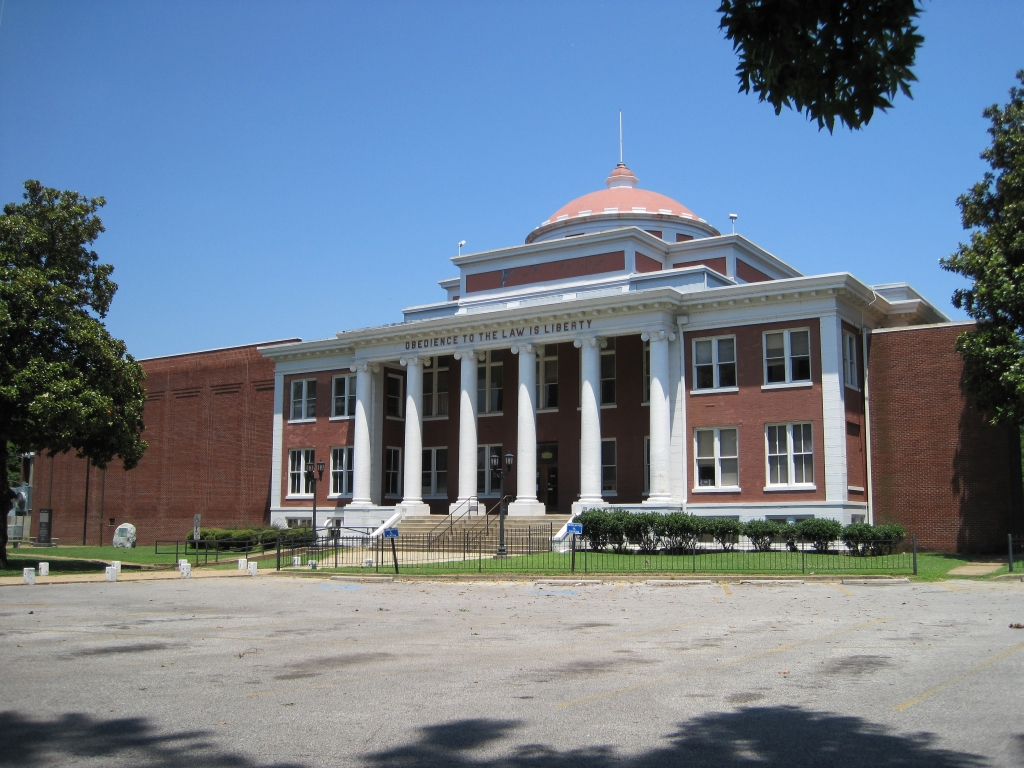
- Crittenden County Courthouse

- Location of Marion in Crittenden County, Arkansas.
- Coordinates: 35°12′22″N 90°12′56″W
- Country: United States
- State: Arkansas
- County: Crittenden
- Incorporated: March 5, 1896
- Named for: Marion Tolbert

Area
  - Total: 20.12 sq mi (52.11 km^{2})
  - Land: 20.04 sq mi (51.91 km^{2})
  - Water: 0.077 sq mi (0.20 km^{2})
- Elevation: 213 ft (65 m)

Population (2020)
  - Total: 13,752
  - Estimate (2025): 13,378 ▼
  - Density: 686.1/sq mi (264.91/km^{2})
- Time zone: UTC−06:00 (Central (CST))
  - Summer (DST): UTC−05:00 (CDT)
- ZIP Code: 72364
- Area code: 870
- FIPS code: 05-44180
- GNIS feature ID: 2405021
- Website: www.marionar.org

Marion is a city in and the county seat of Crittenden County, Arkansas, United States. As of the 2020 census, Marion had a population of 13,752. The city is part of the Memphis metropolitan area. It is the second largest city in Crittenden County, behind West Memphis.

== History ==
=== Early history ===
Although Marion was incorporated in 1896, the community predates that significantly. The site of Marion was part of Louisiana (New Spain) from 1764 to 1803, when it became Louisiana (New France). Some of the oldest land titles in the area are from Spanish land grants from a time prior to the Louisiana Purchase. After the Louisiana Purchase the area was part of the Arkansas Territory. During the 1830s the Trail of Tears (the forced removal of Native Americans from Georgia, Alabama, and Mississippi) passed through the area.

In 1837, two commissioners had been appointed by Crittenden county court to select a site for a new county seat. County residents Marion Tolbert and his wife Temperance gave a deed to the commissioners "for the county of Crittenden for county purposes" on June 25, 1837. A town was laid out and named Marion in honor of the man who gave the land for the site. The town of Marion was officially made the county seat of Crittenden County, Arkansas.

Soon after the county seat was moved from its first location of Greenock on the Mississippi River to Marion, a wooden frame building was constructed in the town for holding court. At an unknown point, the building was destroyed by a tornado. In the late 1850s, the first railroad in the state of Arkansas, the Memphis & Little Rock Railroad, laid tracks 5.5 miles south of the town.

=== American Civil War and after ===
During the American Civil War the steamboat Sultana was destroyed in an explosion on April 27, 1865, as it was transporting released Union POWs near Mound City, just east of Marion. It is estimated that 1,500 soldiers and crew were killed, the largest loss of life in a maritime accident in US history. This tragedy is commemorated by a historic marker placed by the Daughters of the American Revolution.

By 1873, construction started on a two-story brick county courthouse in Marion. This building burned in 1908 and was later replaced with the current brick courthouse. The initial contract for the courthouse and jail was $60k, and due to unknown circumstances construction took many years to finish. In the 1880s, the town received its first proper railway connection when the St. Louis–San Francisco Railway built a line through the town to make a connection between St. Louis, Missouri and Memphis.

In 1954, a local Black man, Isadore Banks, was murdered by a mob in the town. He was chained to a tree, covered with gasoline and burned. Nobody was ever charged in the killing.

=== Incorporation ===
The city of Marion was officially incorporated on March 5, 1896.

=== Italian settlement ===
In the late 19th and early 20th centuries, many Italian immigrants settled in Marion to engage in agricultural work for local plantation owners, such as Will Dockery. Many families later opened various businesses and contributed significantly to the local economy.

Several Italian businesses exist in Marion and the surrounding area, such as Veanos Italian Restaurant and Sicily's in West Memphis.

== Geography ==
Marion is located in eastern Crittenden County. According to the United States Census Bureau, Marion has a total area of 20.5 square miles (53.1 km^{2}), of which 20.4 square miles (52.9 km^{2}) is land and 0.077 square miles (0.2 km^{2}), or 0.37%, is water. It is bordered by the city of West Memphis to the south and by Sunset and Clarkedale to the north.

Ecologically, Marion is located on the border between the Northern Backswamps (west Marion) and Northern Holocene Meander Belts (east Marion) ecoregions within the larger Mississippi Alluvial Plain. The Northern Backswamps are a network of low-lying overflow areas and floodplains historically dominated by bald cypress, water tupelo, overcup oak, water hickory, and Nuttall oak forest subject to year-round or seasonal inundation. The Northern Holocene Meander Belts are the flat floodplains and former alignments of the Mississippi River, including levees, oxbow lakes, and point bars. Much of the wetlands and riverine habitat have been drained and developed for agricultural or urban land uses. The Wapanocca National Wildlife Refuge, which preserves some of the year-round flooded bald cypress forest typical of this ecoregion prior to development for row agriculture lies north of Marion.

Marion is 11 miles (18 km) west of Memphis, Tennessee, which has a humid subtropical climate.

Climate data for Memphis (Memphis Int'l), 1991−2020 normals, (Note: Mean monthly maxima and minima (i.e. the expected highest and lowest temperature readings at any point during the year or given month) calculated based on data at said location from 1991 to 2020.) extremes 1875−present (Note: Official records for Memphis were kept at downtown from January 1875 to December 1939 and at Memphis Int'l since January 1940.)
| Month | Jan | Feb | Mar | Apr | May | Jun | Jul | Aug | Sep | Oct | Nov | Dec | Year |
|---|---|---|---|---|---|---|---|---|---|---|---|---|---|
| Record high °F (°C) | 79 (26) | 81 (27) | 87 (31) | 94 (34) | 99 (37) | 104 (40) | 108 (42) | 107 (42) | 103 (39) | 98 (37) | 86 (30) | 81 (27) | 108 (42) |
| Mean maximum °F (°C) | 70.5 (21.4) | 73.5 (23.1) | 80.2 (26.8) | 85.3 (29.6) | 90.7 (32.6) | 95.9 (35.5) | 98.1 (36.7) | 98.5 (36.9) | 95.3 (35.2) | 88.5 (31.4) | 79.1 (26.2) | 71.4 (21.9) | 99.9 (37.7) |
| Mean daily maximum °F (°C) | 50.9 (10.5) | 55.5 (13.1) | 64.2 (17.9) | 73.4 (23.0) | 81.7 (27.6) | 89.4 (31.9) | 91.9 (33.3) | 91.5 (33.1) | 86.0 (30.0) | 75.1 (23.9) | 62.6 (17.0) | 53.4 (11.9) | 73.0 (22.8) |
| Daily mean °F (°C) | 42.1 (5.6) | 46.1 (7.8) | 54.2 (12.3) | 63.2 (17.3) | 72.1 (22.3) | 79.9 (26.6) | 82.8 (28.2) | 82.1 (27.8) | 76.0 (24.4) | 64.6 (18.1) | 52.7 (11.5) | 44.8 (7.1) | 63.4 (17.4) |
| Mean daily minimum °F (°C) | 33.3 (0.7) | 36.7 (2.6) | 44.3 (6.8) | 53.0 (11.7) | 62.4 (16.9) | 70.4 (21.3) | 73.6 (23.1) | 72.6 (22.6) | 65.9 (18.8) | 54.0 (12.2) | 42.9 (6.1) | 36.2 (2.3) | 53.8 (12.1) |
| Mean minimum °F (°C) | 16.0 (−8.9) | 20.8 (−6.2) | 26.3 (−3.2) | 37.3 (2.9) | 48.4 (9.1) | 60.4 (15.8) | 67.0 (19.4) | 64.8 (18.2) | 52.4 (11.3) | 38.0 (3.3) | 27.3 (−2.6) | 21.1 (−6.1) | 13.6 (−10.2) |
| Record low °F (°C) | −8 (−22) | −11 (−24) | 12 (−11) | 27 (−3) | 36 (2) | 48 (9) | 52 (11) | 48 (9) | 36 (2) | 25 (−4) | 9 (−13) | −13 (−25) | −13 (−25) |
| Average precipitation inches (mm) | 4.14 (105) | 4.55 (116) | 5.74 (146) | 5.87 (149) | 5.27 (134) | 3.99 (101) | 4.82 (122) | 3.37 (86) | 3.03 (77) | 3.98 (101) | 4.69 (119) | 5.49 (139) | 54.94 (1,395) |
| Average snowfall inches (cm) | 0.9 (2.3) | 1.0 (2.5) | 0.5 (1.3) | 0.0 (0.0) | 0.0 (0.0) | 0.0 (0.0) | 0.0 (0.0) | 0.0 (0.0) | 0.0 (0.0) | 0.0 (0.0) | 0.1 (0.25) | 0.2 (0.51) | 2.7 (6.9) |
| Average precipitation days (≥ 0.01 in) | 10.0 | 9.9 | 11.5 | 9.6 | 10.6 | 8.9 | 9.5 | 7.6 | 7.1 | 7.5 | 9.0 | 10.2 | 111.4 |
| Average snowy days (≥ 0.1 in) | 1.0 | 0.8 | 0.3 | 0.0 | 0.0 | 0.0 | 0.0 | 0.0 | 0.0 | 0.0 | 0.2 | 0.3 | 2.6 |
| Average relative humidity (%) | 68.2 | 66.4 | 63.2 | 62.5 | 66.4 | 66.8 | 69.1 | 69.6 | 71.3 | 66.2 | 67.7 | 68.8 | 67.2 |
| Average dew point °F (°C) | 28.6 (−1.9) | 31.8 (−0.1) | 39.4 (4.1) | 48.6 (9.2) | 58.3 (14.6) | 65.7 (18.7) | 70.0 (21.1) | 68.5 (20.3) | 63.1 (17.3) | 50.2 (10.1) | 41.0 (5.0) | 32.7 (0.4) | 49.8 (9.9) |
| Mean monthly sunshine hours | 166.6 | 173.8 | 215.3 | 254.6 | 301.5 | 320.6 | 326.9 | 307.0 | 251.2 | 245.9 | 173.0 | 151.9 | 2,888.3 |
| Percentage possible sunshine | 53 | 57 | 58 | 65 | 69 | 74 | 74 | 74 | 68 | 70 | 56 | 50 | 65 |
| Average ultraviolet index | 2.4 | 3.7 | 5.6 | 7.5 | 8.8 | 9.5 | 9.7 | 8.8 | 7.1 | 4.8 | 3.0 | 2.2 | 6.0 |
Source 1: NOAA (relative humidity and dew point 1961−1990, sun 1961−1987)
Source 2: UV Index Today (1995 to 2022)

== Notable citizens ==
- Sid Eudy – pro wrestler, "Sid Vicious"
- John Tate – heavyweight boxing champion
- Asa Hodges – politician, slaveholder, and lawyer
- Sonora Smart Dodd - Responsible for the founding of Father's Day

== Transportation ==
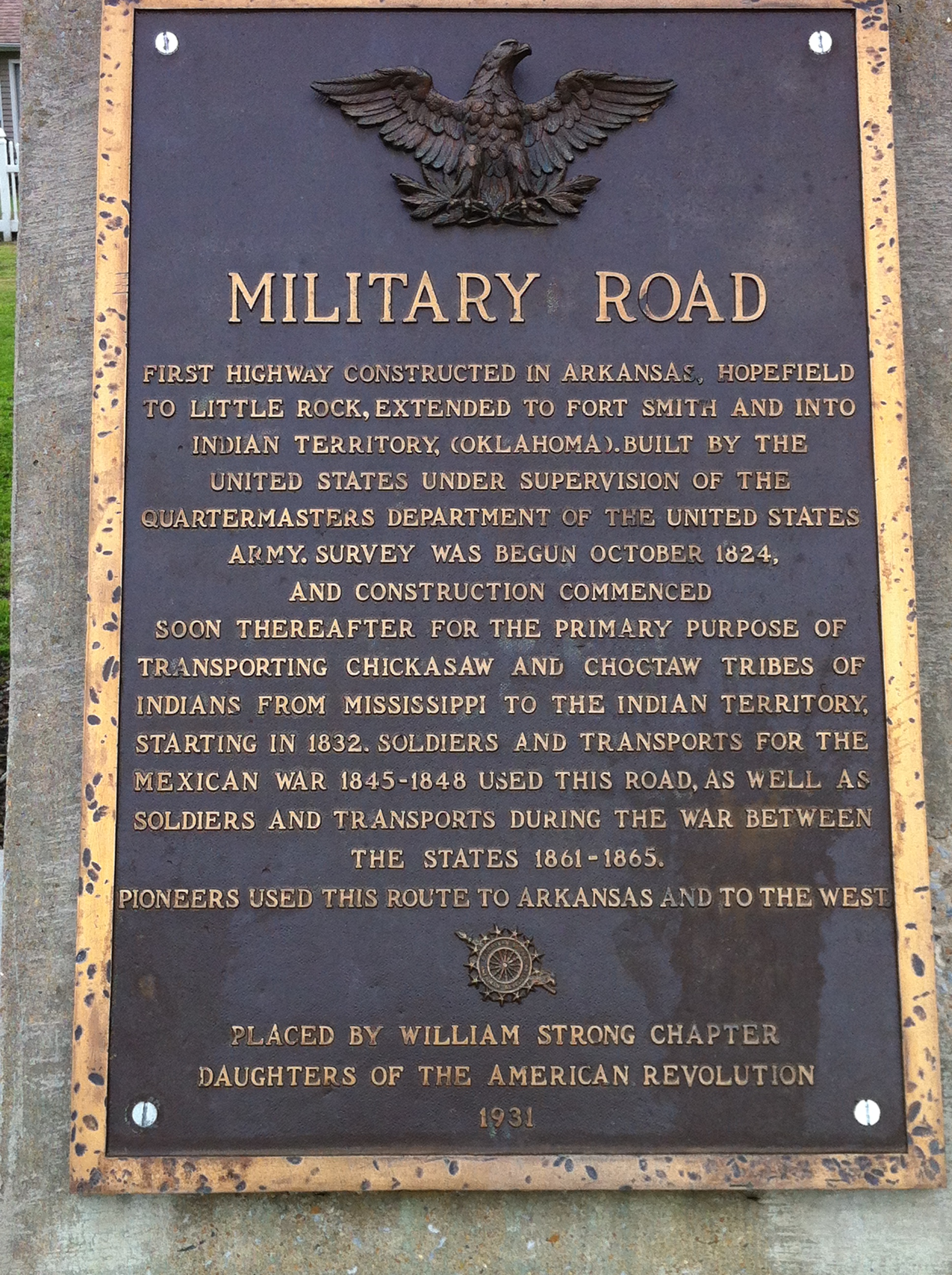
Historic marker in Marion noting that Military Road (US 64) was used for the Trail of Tears

=== Major highways ===
Marion is bisected by Interstate 55/US 61 and is located just to the north of its junction with Interstate 40 prior to their crossing the Mississippi River, en route to Memphis. U.S. Highway 64 is the major east–west route through the town. Arkansas Highway 77 is a major north–south arterial road, east of Interstate 55, and Highway 118 is the major north–south arterial road, west of Interstate 55.

=== Aviation ===
Marion is served for general aviation by the West Memphis Municipal Airport (KAWM). General DeWitt Spain Airport is a civil aviation airport just north of downtown Memphis. Memphis International Airport is located south of Memphis; it provides commercial aviation through numerous carriers and is the international cargo hub for FedEx.

=== Rail ===
Union Pacific operates a 600-acre (240 ha) intermodal facility west of Marion. BNSF Railway also operates an intermodal yard in Marion.

Limited passenger rail is available on Amtrak at Central Station in nearby Memphis. The City of New Orleans runs twice daily on a north–south route from Chicago to New Orleans.

=== Water ===
Crittenden County and West Memphis jointly operate a port on the Mississippi River. The International Port of Memphis lies just across the Mississippi River via Interstate 55. The International Port of Memphis is the fourth-largest inland port in the United States.

== Community ==
Because of its proximity to Memphis and Interstate highways, Marion offers the activities and enrichment of a large city while maintaining the character of a small community. In addition to the many community events common to any town, each May Marion hosts the Esperanza Bonanza, a festival that includes live music, a barbecue competition, a rodeo, a golf tournament, a carnival, and games for adults & children. More recently Marion has begun "Christmas on the Square" in early December co-sponsored by the local Kiwanis Club and the Marion Chamber of Commerce.

Marion is served by the Woolfolk Public Library which is jointly operated by Crittenden County and the city of Marion. It was named in honor of a local author and newspaper editor, Margaret Woolfolk.

Outdoor recreation is a big part of community life, from organized youth sports to individual and family activities. Marion is located less than 1 hour from 12 Arkansas, Tennessee or Mississippi state parks. Additional outdoor recreation is available at Wapanocca National Wildlife Refuge about 10 miles (16 km) north of town. The nearby community of Horseshoe Lake offers opportunity for water sports.

== Healthcare ==
Marion and Crittenden County were served by Crittenden Regional Hospital, a 152-bed JCAHO Accredited facility in nearby West Memphis until its closure in 2014. Starting in 2016 Crittenden Regional Hospital was converted into a female correctional facility and renamed East Central Arkansas Community Correction Center.

Marion and Crittenden County have been served by Baptist Memorial Hospital-Crittenden which opened on December 13, 2018.

== Demographics ==
Historical population
| Census | Pop. | Note | %± |
|---|---|---|---|
| 1880 | 199 | | — |
| 1940 | 758 | | — |
| 1950 | 883 | | 16.5% |
| 1960 | 881 | | −0.2% |
| 1970 | 1,431 | | 62.4% |
| 1980 | 2,996 | | 109.4% |
| 1990 | 4,391 | | 46.6% |
| 2000 | 8,901 | | 102.7% |
| 2010 | 12,345 | | 38.7% |
| 2020 | 13,752 | | 11.4% |
| 2025 (est.) | 13,378 | ▼ | −2.7% |
U.S. Decennial Census

=== 2020 census ===
As of the 2020 census, Marion had a population of 13,752, with 5,096 households and 3,198 families residing in the city. The median age was 35.7 years. 27.3% of residents were under the age of 18 and 11.5% of residents were 65 years of age or older. For every 100 females there were 90.0 males, and for every 100 females age 18 and over there were 84.8 males age 18 and over.

96.4% of residents lived in urban areas, while 3.6% lived in rural areas.

Of the city's households, 39.5% had children under the age of 18 living in them. Of all households, 48.4% were married-couple households, 16.0% were households with a male householder and no spouse or partner present, and 30.4% were households with a female householder and no spouse or partner present. About 24.0% of all households were made up of individuals and 7.1% had someone living alone who was 65 years of age or older.

There were 5,344 housing units, of which 4.6% were vacant. The homeowner vacancy rate was 1.0% and the rental vacancy rate was 8.2%.

Racial composition as of the 2020 census
| Race | Number | Percent |
|---|---|---|
| White | 7,440 | 54.1% |
| Black or African American | 5,276 | 38.4% |
| American Indian and Alaska Native | 40 | 0.3% |
| Asian | 191 | 1.4% |
| Native Hawaiian and Other Pacific Islander | 6 | 0.0% |
| Some other race | 195 | 1.4% |
| Two or more races | 604 | 4.4% |
| Hispanic or Latino (of any race) | 428 | 3.1% |

=== 2010 census ===
As of the census of 2010, there were 12,345 people and 4,278 households in the city. The population density was 604.4 inhabitants per square mile (233.4/km^{2}). The racial makeup of the city was 68.1% White, 28% Black or African American, 0.4% Native American, 1.5% Asian, 1.4% from two or more races. 2.0% of the population were Hispanic or Latino of any race.

88% of the population had a high school diploma and 28% reported a bachelor's degree or higher. 2.5% of the population is foreign born and 4.4% report a language other than English being spoken at home. The home ownership rate was 71.3% at a median value of $142,200. The median household income was $60,051. 7.3% of the population are below the poverty line.

== Education ==
Crittenden County is served by Mid-South Community College in West Memphis. The college offers bachelor's and master's degree programs in conjunction with Arkansas State University, the University of Arkansas, the University of Central Arkansas, Arkansas Tech University and Franklin University.

=== Public schools ===
The Marion School District serves most of the city while a small portion is zoned to the West Memphis School District.

Marion district schools:

- Visual and Performing Arts Magnet School (grades pre-k through 6th grade) (West Memphis)
- Math, Science, and Technology Magnet School (grades K through 6th)
- Herbert Carter Global Magnet School (grades K through 6th)
- Marion Middle School (grade 7)
- Marion Jr. High School (grades 8 through 9)
- Marion High School (grades 10–12)

The sole high school of the West Memphis district is Academies of West Memphis (formerly West Memphis High School).

=== Private schools ===
- West Memphis Christian School, PK–12 (West Memphis)
- Crittenden Pentecostal Academy, K–12 (West Memphis)
- St. Michael's Catholic School, PK–6 (West Memphis)
