= James Wofford (politician) =

State legislator in Arkansas

Arkansas State Representative
- In office 1877–?

James Wofford was a state legislator in Arkansas. He represented Crittenden County in the Arkansas House of Representatives in 1877. He was one of eight African Americans elected to the Arkansas General Assembly in 1876.

== See also ==
- African American officeholders from the end of the Civil War until before 1900
