= Crittenden County Courthouse =

- U.S. National Register of Historic Places
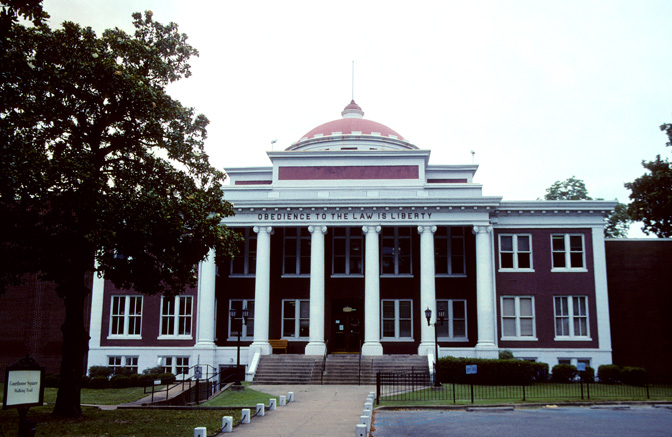
- Crittenden County Courthouse

- Location within Arkansas Location within the United States
- Location: 85 Jackson St., Marion, Arkansas
- Coordinates: 35°12′57″N 90°11′45″W
- Area: 1 acre (0.40 ha)
- Built: 1910
- Architect: Chamberlain & Co.
- NRHP reference No.: 77000251
- Added to NRHP: August 3, 1977

The Crittenden County Courthouse is located at 85 Jackson Street in Marion, Arkansas, United States, the county seat of Crittenden County. It is a two-story brick and stone structure, nine bays wide and seven deep, with a dome centered on its otherwise flat roof. The north and south elevations, identical in appearance, feature porticos supported by six Ionic columns framing the center five bays. The frieze on each portico is inscribed "Obedience to the law is liberty". The courthouse was designed by the Chamberlain architectural firm of Fort Worth, Texas, and was built in 1911, replacing the county's second courthouse, which was destroyed by fire in 1909.

The building was listed on the National Register of Historic Places in 1977.

== See also ==
- National Register of Historic Places listings in Crittenden County, Arkansas
