= Jerry Franklin =

American football player (born 1988)

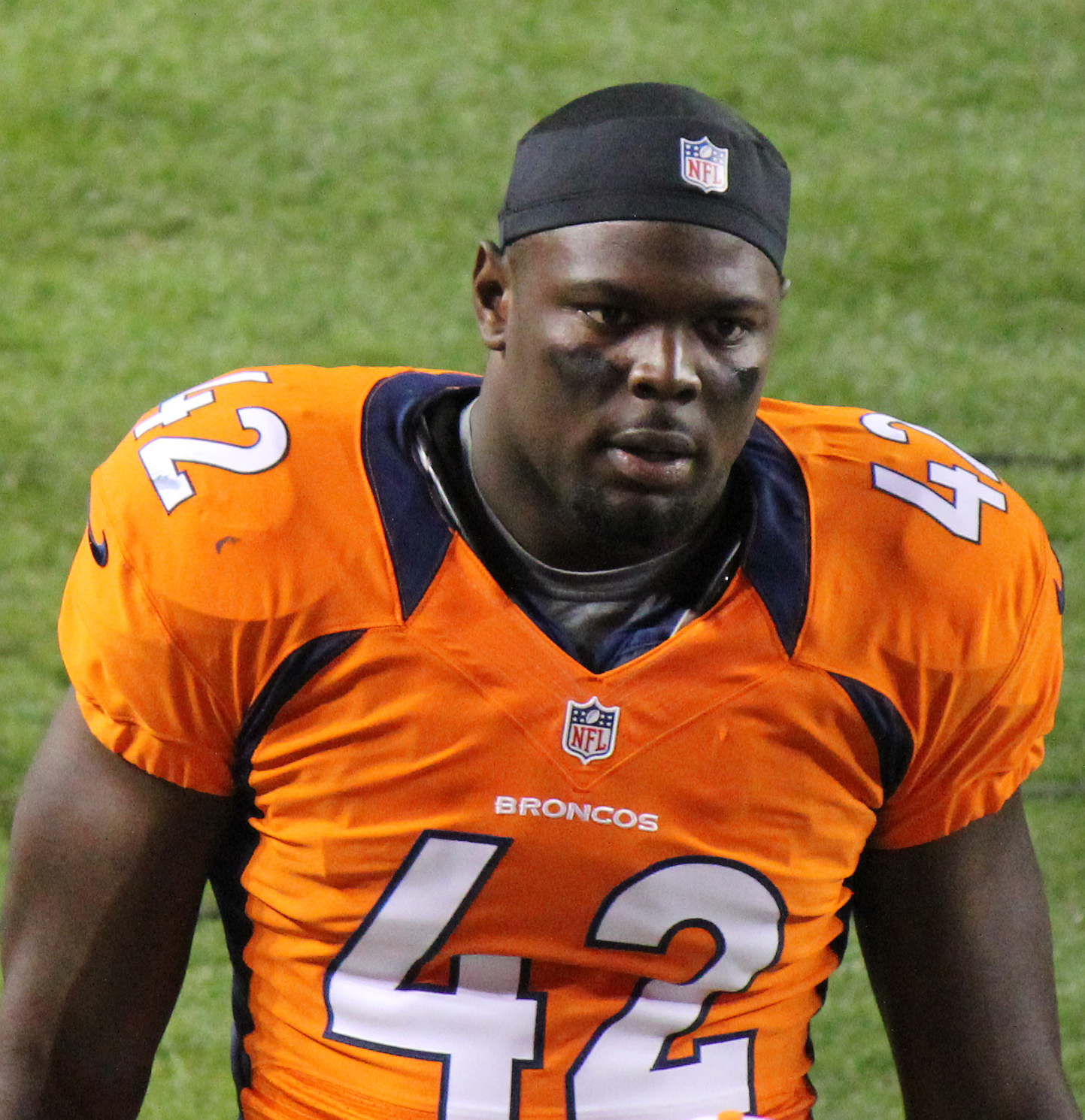
- Franklin with the Denver Broncos in 2012

No. 42, 53, 59
- Position: Linebacker

Personal information
- Born: January 10, 1988 (age 38); Sunset, Arkansas, U.S.
- Listed height: 6 ft 1 in (1.85 m)
- Listed weight: 245 lb (111 kg)

Career information
- High school: Marion (AR)
- College: Arkansas
- NFL draft: 2012: undrafted

Career history
- Denver Broncos (2012)*; Carolina Panthers (2012)*; Dallas Cowboys (2012)*; Chicago Bears (2012–2013); Kansas City Chiefs (2014); New Orleans Saints (2014); Detroit Lions (2016)*
- * Offseason or practice squad member only

Awards and highlights
- 2× Second-team All-SEC (2010, 2011)

Career NFL statistics
- Total tackles: 12
- Stats at Pro Football Reference

Jerry Franklin (born January 10, 1988) is an American former professional football player who was a linebacker in the National Football League (NFL). He was signed by the Denver Broncos as an undrafted free agent in 2012. Franklin played college football for the Arkansas Razorbacks.

== Early life ==
Franklin attended Marion High School, where he was named the Class 6A Offensive Player of the Year and the 6A East Back of the Year as a senior. Considered a three-star recruit by Rivals.com, Franklin was listed No. 38 among safety prospects in the nation.

== College career ==
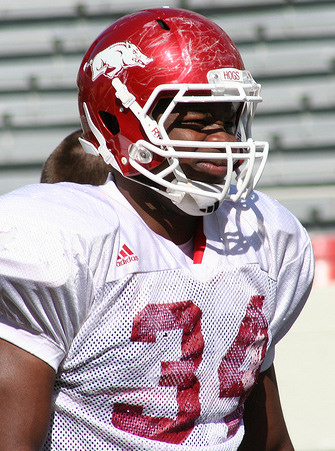
Franklin at Arkansas

Originally recruited as a defensive back, Franklin moved from safety to linebacker during his redshirt season in 2007. Franklin has started at multiple positions for the Razorbacks, including weakside linebacker and middle linebacker. In his freshman season, Franklin recorded a team-high 87 tackles, and had two forced fumbles and two fumble recoveries. He was named to Sporting News' Freshman All-American team, as well as College Football News' Second-team. During a time when Arkansas's defense struggled with consecutive 12th-place finishes in the SEC in total yards allowed in 2008 and 2009, Franklin was a mainstay of the defense. In his sophomore season he again led the team in tackles with 94, and also had five tackles for loss and one and a half sacks. He recovered two fumbles on the year, returning one of them 85 yards for a touchdown against Texas A&M. Franklin finished his career as a four-year starter for the Hogs. He led Arkansas in tackles in each of the past four years, finishing with 100 or more tackles in his junior and senior seasons- 101 in 2011 and 100 in 2010.

== Professional career ==
Pre-draft measurables
Height	Weight	40-yard dash	10-yard split	20-yard split	20-yard shuttle	Three-cone drill	Vertical jump	Broad jump	Bench press
6 ft 1 3/8 in (1.86 m)	242 lb (110 kg)	4.63 s	1.57 s	2.72 s	4.38 s	6.93 s	37.5 in (0.95 m)	10 ft 3 in (3.12 m)	15 reps
All values from Pro Day

=== Denver Broncos ===
On April 28, 2012, Franklin was signed as an undrafted free agent by the Denver Broncos.

=== Carolina Panthers ===
After being waived by the Broncos before the start of the regular season, Franklin was added to the Carolina Panthers' practice squad on October 17, 2012. He was released from the Panthers practice squad on November 13, 2012.

=== Dallas Cowboys ===
Franklin was signed to the Dallas Cowboys' practice squad on November 14, 2012. He later chose to leave the squad and join the Chicago Bears' 53 man roster.

=== Chicago Bears ===
Franklin was signed by the Chicago Bears on December 11, 2012 to a two-year contract. On August 30, 2013, Franklin was released by the Bears. On September 1, he was added to the Bears' practice squad. He was promoted to the active roster on October 18 after D. J. Williams was placed on injured reserve.

=== Kansas City Chiefs ===
Franklin signed with the Kansas City Chiefs' practice squad on September 1, 2014. He was promoted to the active roster on September 9, 2014. He was waived by the team on November 8, 2014.

=== New Orleans Saints ===
Franklin was signed to the New Orleans Saints' practice squad on November 28, 2014. He was promoted to the active roster on December 26, 2014.

=== Detroit Lions ===
On February 11, 2016, Franklin signed a one-year contract with the Detroit Lions.
