= Sandy Shepard Odum =

American politician

Sandy Shepard Odum (1852/1858–1930s) was a politician in Arkansas. He represented Crittenden County in the Arkansas House of Representatives in 1887. He was African-American.

== See also ==
- African American officeholders from the end of the Civil War until before 1900
