= Ray Brown (offensive lineman) =

American football player and coach (born 1962)

No. 62, 67, 65, 61
- Positions: Guard, tackle

Personal information
- Born: December 12, 1962 (age 63); Marion, Arkansas, U.S.
- Listed height: 6 ft 5 in (1.96 m)
- Listed weight: 318 lb (144 kg)

Career information
- High school: Marion
- College: Memphis; Arkansas State
- NFL draft: 1986: 8th round, 201st overall pick

Career history

Playing
- St. Louis / Phoenix Cardinals (1986–1988); Washington Redskins (1989–1995); San Francisco 49ers (1996–2001); Detroit Lions (2002–2003); Washington Redskins (2004–2005)

Coaching
- Washington Redskins (2006) Special assistant coach; Buffalo Bills (2008–2009) Assistant offensive line coach; San Francisco 49ers (2010) Assistant offensive line coach; Carolina Panthers (2011–2015) Assistant offensive line coach; Carolina Panthers (2016–2017) Offensive line coach; Arizona Cardinals (2018) Offensive line coach

Awards and highlights
- As player: Super Bowl champion (XXVI); Second-team All-Pro (2001); Pro Bowl (2001)

Career NFL statistics
- Games played: 262
- Games started: 205
- Fumble recoveries: 3
- Stats at Pro Football Reference

Leonard Ray Brown Jr. (born December 12, 1962) is an American former professional football player and coach in the National Football League (NFL) He played as a guard and tackle for 20 seasons. He became a coach, last serving as the offensive line coach for the Arizona Cardinals.

Brown played college football for the Memphis Tigers and transferred to the Arkansas State Red Wolves. He was selected by the St. Louis Cardinals in the eighth round of the 1986 NFL draft. He also played for the Washington Redskins, San Francisco 49ers, and Detroit Lions.

== Playing career ==
=== Early years ===
Following graduation from Marion High School where he started at running back and tight end, he played college football for The University of Memphis and transferred to Arkansas State University where Coach Larry Lacewell converted him to an offensive lineman.

=== National Football League ===
St Louis Cardinals

Brown was drafted in the eighth round of the 1986 NFL Draft by the St. Louis Cardinals. He wore number 62 with the Cardinals. In 1986 he played in 11 games, starting 4. In 1987 he played in 7 games. In 1988, with the Phoenix Cardinals he played 15 games.

Washington Redskins

In 1989 Brown signed with the Washington Redskins. He played 7 games that season. In 1990 he did not play in any games. In 1991 he missed the whole season because of an elbow injury. He came back the next season and over the next 4 seasons, he played in every game.

San Francisco 49ers

In 1996, Brown played with the 49ers. He played in all 16 games. In 1997 he played in 15 out of 16 games. In his 13th year in the NFL, he played all 16 games at the age of 35. He played in three more seasons for the 49ers, and made the Pro Bowl in 2001. Brown is one of the oldest players to play in the Pro Bowl, doing so at the age of 40.

Detroit Lions

Ray Brown played 2 seasons with the Detroit Lions from 2002 to 2003.

Return to Washington

Brown played in 2004 and in 2005 with the Redskins. He announced his retirement on January 14, 2006 after 20 seasons. That same day, he started a playoff game, becoming, at 43, one of the oldest players to start a playoff game.

== Coaching career ==
Arcadia High School Head Coach Undefeated regular season 2023–2024

=== Washington Redskins ===
Brown was a special assistant coach for the Washington Redskins in 2006.

=== Buffalo Bills ===
Brown was hired as assistant offensive line coach for the Buffalo Bills on January 17, 2008. He was not retained by the Bills after the firing of head coach Dick Jauron.

=== San Francisco 49ers ===
Brown was hired as offensive line coach for the San Francisco 49ers for the 2010 season.

=== Carolina Panthers ===
On January 25, 2011, Brown was announced as the assistant line coach for the Carolina Panthers.

In the 2015 season, Brown and the Panthers reached Super Bowl 50 on February 7, 2016. The Panthers fell to the Denver Broncos by a score of 24–10.

=== Arizona Cardinals ===
On February 14, 2018, Brown was hired by the Arizona Cardinals as their offensive line coach.
