= Jennette, Arkansas =

- Town
- Location of Jennette in Crittenden County and St. Francis County, Arkansas.
- Coordinates: 35°09′32″N 90°24′38″W
- Country: United States
- State: Arkansas
- Counties: Crittenden, St. Francis

Area
  - Total: 2.27 sq mi (5.88 km^{2})
  - Land: 2.27 sq mi (5.87 km^{2})
  - Water: 0.0039 sq mi (0.01 km^{2})
- Elevation: 207 ft (63 m)

Population (2020)
  - Total: 118
  - Estimate (2025): 113 ▼
  - Density: 52.1/sq mi (20.11/km^{2})
- Time zone: UTC−06:00 (Central (CST))
  - Summer (DST): UTC−05:00 (CDT)
- FIPS code: 05-35040
- GNIS feature ID: 2405913

Jennette is a town in Crittenden and St. Francis counties, Arkansas, United States. The population was 118 at the 2020 census.

== Geography ==
Jennette is located in western Crittenden County. It occupies a rural area north of Interstate 40 that is 21 miles (34 km) west of downtown Memphis.

According to the United States Census Bureau, the town has a total area of 2.5 square miles (6.4 km^{2}), of which 0.008 square miles (0.02 km^{2}), or 0.36%, is water.

== Demographics ==
Historical population
Census	Pop.	Note	%±
1990	184		—
2000	124		−32.6%
2010	115		−7.3%
2020	118		2.6%
2025 (est.)	113	▼	−4.2%
U.S. Decennial Census

=== Racial and ethnic composition ===
Jennette town, Arkansas – Racial and ethnic composition Note: the US Census treats Hispanic/Latino as an ethnic category. This table excludes Latinos from the racial categories and assigns them to a separate category. Hispanics/Latinos may be of any race.
Race / Ethnicity (NH = Non-Hispanic)	Pop 2000	Pop 2010	Pop 2020	% 2000	% 2010	% 2020
White alone (NH)	15	7	10	12.10%	6.09%	8.47%
Black or African American alone (NH)	109	108	106	87.90%	93.91%	89.83%
Native American or Alaska Native alone (NH)	0	0	0	0.00%	0.00%	0.00%
Asian alone (NH)	0	0	0	0.00%	0.00%	0.00%
Native Hawaiian or Pacific Islander alone (NH)	0	0	0	0.00%	0.00%	0.00%
Other race alone (NH)	0	0	0	0.00%	0.00%	0.00%
Mixed race or Multiracial (NH)	0	0	1	0.00%	0.00%	0.85%
Hispanic or Latino (any race)	0	0	1	0.00%	0.00%	0.85%
Total	124	115	118	100.00%	100.00%	100.00%

=== 2020 census ===
As of the 2020 United States census, there were 118 people, 45 households, and 16 families residing in the town.

=== 2010 census ===
As of the 2010 United States census, there were 115 people living in the town. The racial makeup of the town was 93.9% Black and 6.1% White.

As of the census of 2000, there were 124 people, 46 households, and 31 families living in the town. The population density was 22.0 people/km^{2} (57 people/mi^{2}). There were 49 housing units at an average density of 8.7 units/km^{2} (23 units/mi^{2}). The racial makeup of the town was 12.10% White and 87.90% Black or African American.

There were 46 households, out of which 23.9% had children under the age of 18 living with them, 43.5% were married couples living together, 19.6% had a female householder with no husband present, and 32.6% were non-families. 30.4% of all households were made up of individuals, and 10.9% had someone living alone who was 65 years of age or older. The average household size was 2.70 and the average family size was 3.29.

In the town, the population was spread out, with 29.0% under the age of 18, 6.5% from 18 to 24, 22.6% from 25 to 44, 32.3% from 45 to 64, and 9.7% who were 65 years of age or older. The median age was 39 years. For every 100 females, there were 93.8 males. For every 100 females age 18 and over, there were 76.0 males.

The median income for a household in the town was $22,500, and the median income for a family was $23,750. Males had a median income of $27,083 versus $21,250 for females. The per capita income for the town was $7,571. There were 20.7% of families and 45.3% of the population living below the poverty line, including 71.9% of under eighteens and 28.6% of those over 64.

== Education ==
School districts with portions of Jennette include the Earle School District, the Marion School District, and the West Memphis School District. The portion in St. Francis County was formerly served by the Hughes School District; On April 9, 2015, due to the low number of students in the Hughes district, the Arkansas Board of Education voted to consolidate the Hughes district into the West Memphis district 7–1.

The respective high schools of the districts are Earle High School, Marion High School, and Academies of West Memphis (formerly West Memphis High School). The Hughes district formerly operated Hughes High School.
