= Mound City, Arkansas =

Mound City
- unincorporated community
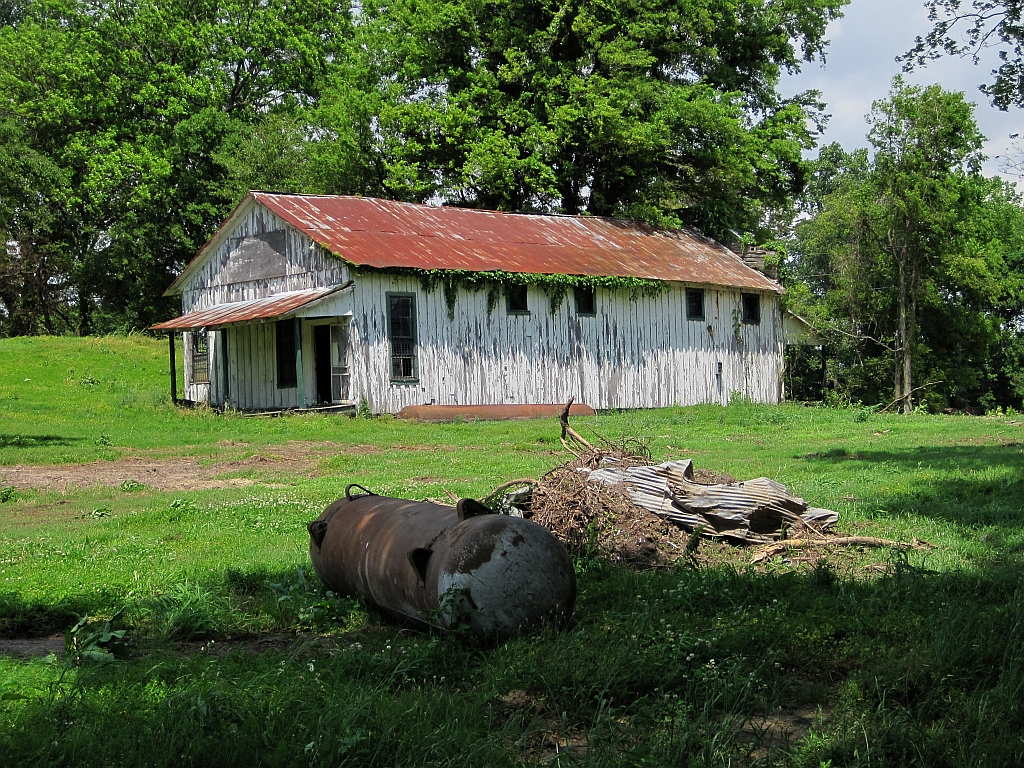
- The commissary building at Mound City before its renovation.

- Location of Mound City in Arkansas Mound City (the United States)
- Coordinates: 35°11′25″N 90°07′45″W
- Country: United States
- State: Arkansas
- County: Crittenden
- First Settled: 1850s
- Time zone: Central (CST)
  - Summer (DST): CDT
- Area code: 870

Mound City is an unincorporated community in Crittenden County, Arkansas. Mound City township covers an area of 25.4 square miles. In 2009 it had a population of 318; 162 males and 156 females. Mound City is located about 6 miles (9.7 km) northwest of Memphis, Tennessee and near oxbow lakes that in the past were the main course of the Mississippi River. The river has changed its course and is now about 3 miles (4.8 km) east of Mound City.

== History ==
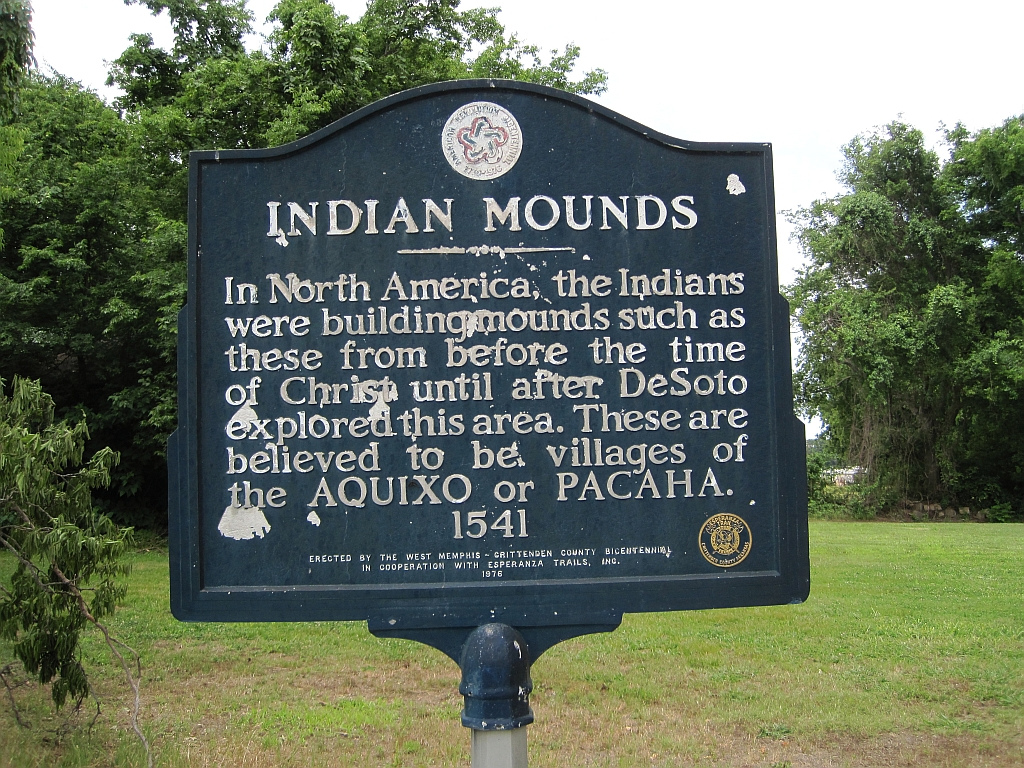
A historical marker at Mound City

=== Pre-European Civilization ===
The community was named to honor the numerous prehistoric Native American earthen mounds which are found in the surrounding area. The mounds have not been thoroughly investigated and are threatened by the expansion of the city of West Memphis, Arkansas. The mounds may be a manifestation of the Marksville culture dating between 500 BCE and 500 CE.

=== Antebellum Period ===
According to Goodspeed's History of eastern Arkansas, Mound City was an important trading post in the 1850s and 1860, with many stores and hotels. However, by the 1890s, all of this commerce was gone from the area.

On June 5, 1862, Federal troops disembarked on the Mississippi River at Mound City and captured the area. The First Battle of Memphis was fought on June 6. On February 13, 1863, Federal troops burned communities in the area in retaliation for a Confederate raid on a steamboat and barges plying the Mississippi River. Racial tensions in Mound City were high between former African-American slaves and whites after the war.

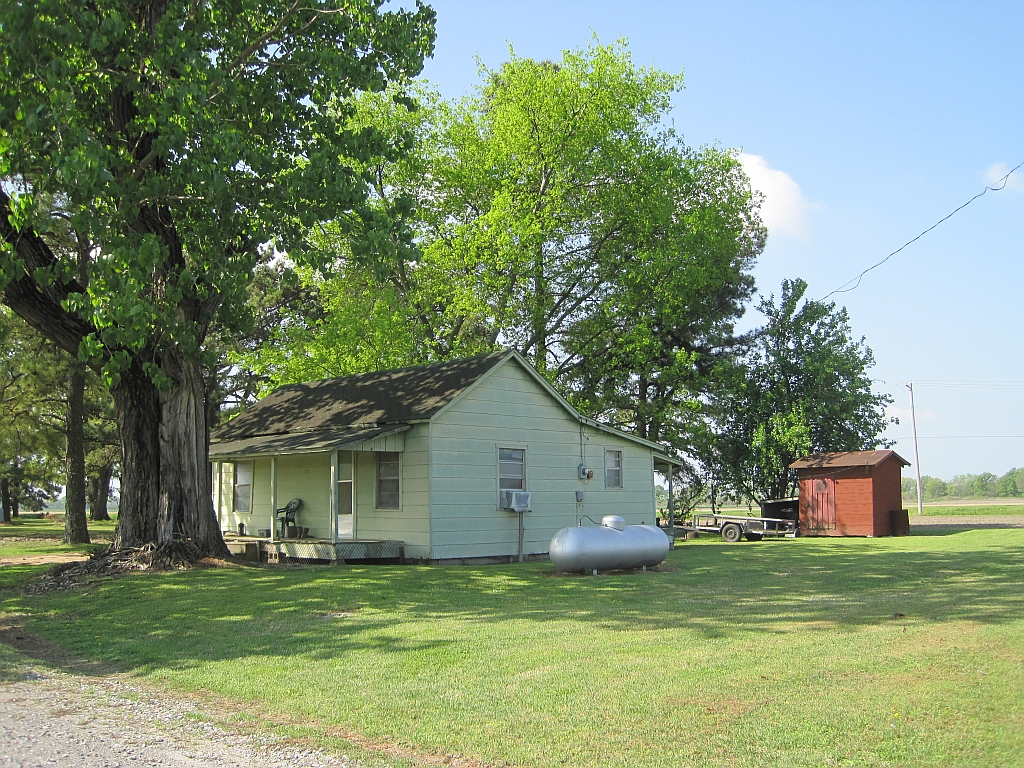
A sharecropper house available for rent at Mound City, Arkansas

=== 21st Century ===
A former plantation known as Mound City and dating from about 1900 has been renovated and the existing sharecropper houses and commissary are vacation rentals and an events facility.
