= Marion School District (Arkansas) =

School district in Arkansas

Location
- 200 Manor Street; Marion, Arkansas 72364 United States

District information
- Grades: KG–12
- Established: 1869
- Accreditations: ADE; AdvancED
- Schools: 6
- NCES District ID: 0509390

Students and staff
- Students: 4,326
- Teachers: 258.75 (on FTE basis)
- Staff: 563.75 (on FTE basis)
- Student–teacher ratio: 16.72
- Athletic conference: 7A/6A East (2012–14)
- District mascot: Patriots
- Colors: Red; White; Blue

Other information
- Website: www.msd3.org

Marion School District is a public school district based in Marion, Arkansas, United States. The school district provides early childhood, elementary and secondary education for more than 4,300 kindergarten through grade 12 students at its six facilities at Marion and West Memphis in Crittenden County, Arkansas.

The district encompasses almost all of Marion, the municipalities of Clarkedale, Crawfordsville, Gilmore, Jericho, Sunset, Turrell, and portions of Jennette and West Memphis.

Established in 1869, Marion School District is accredited by the Arkansas Department of Education (ADE) and its accreditation by AdvancED is under advisement

In November 2012, educator Alexia T. Weimer of Avondale Elementary School was recognized by Governor Mike Beebe as the 2013 Arkansas Teacher of the Year, as part of the National Teacher of the Year program.

It is one of the few remaining school districts in the US which still practices Corporal Punishment.

== History ==
On July 1, 2004, the Crawfordsville School District consolidated into the Marion School District. On July 1, 2010, the Turrell School District consolidated into the Marion School District.

== Schools ==
Secondary schools:

- Marion High School—serving approximately 900 students in grades 10 through 12.
- Marion Junior High School—serving approximately 800 students in grades 8 and 9.
- Marion 7th Grade Academy, serving grade 7.

Magnet schools:

- Marion Math, Science and Technology Magnet-serving approximately 375 students in grades Pre-K Through 6.
- Hebert Carter Global Community Magnet—serving approximately 225 students in grades Pre-K through 6.
- Marion Visual and Performing arts Magnet (West Memphis)—serving approximately 300 students in Pre-K Through 6.

== Former schools ==
- Marion Elementary School, grades 2-3.
- Marion Intermediate School, grades 4-5.
- Marion Middle School, grades 6-7.
- Phelix Elementary School, grade 1. Sunset, Arkansas.
