= Sunset, Arkansas =

- Town
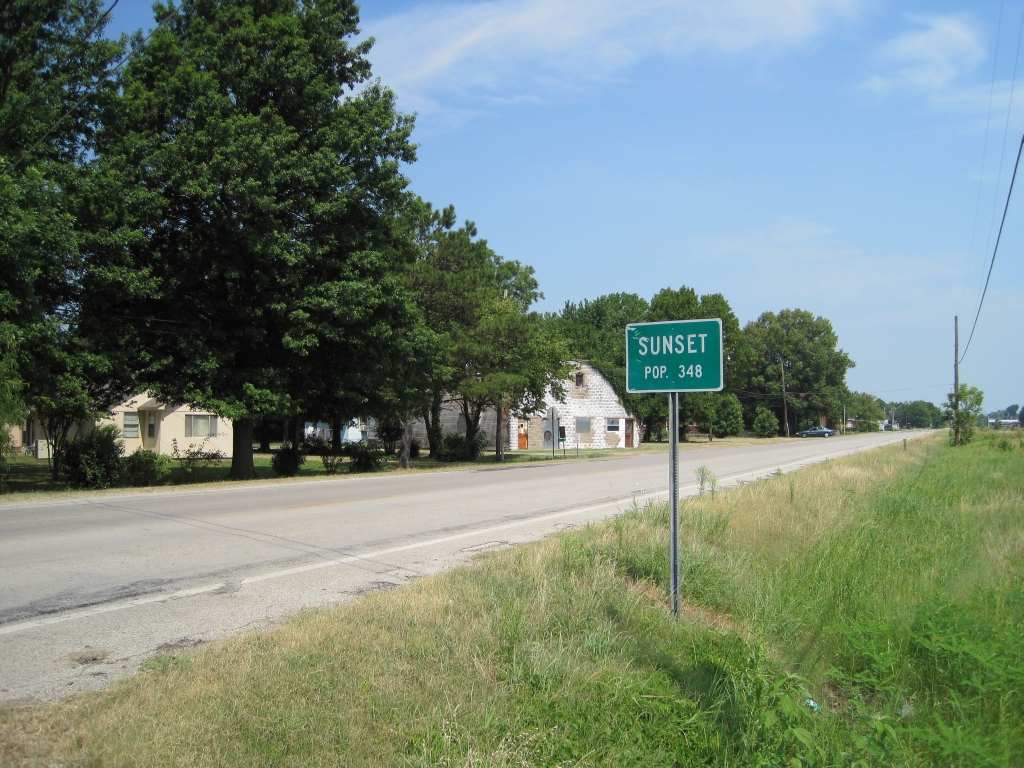

- Location of Sunset in Crittenden County, Arkansas.
- Coordinates: 35°13′26″N 90°12′20″W
- Country: United States
- State: Arkansas
- County: Crittenden
- Established: November 8, 2017

Government
  - Type: Mayor-Council

Area
  - Total: 0.26 sq mi (0.68 km^{2})
  - Land: 0.26 sq mi (0.68 km^{2})
  - Water: 0 sq mi (0.00 km^{2})
- Elevation: 220 ft (67 m)

Population (2020)
  - Total: 184
  - Estimate (2025): 161 ▼
  - Density: 700/sq mi (270.4/km^{2})
- Time zone: UTC-6 (Central (CST))
  - Summer (DST): UTC-5 (CDT)
- Postal code: 72364
- Area code: 870
- FIPS code: 05-68060
- GNIS feature ID: 2406691

Sunset is a town in Crittenden County, Arkansas, United States. As of the 2020 census, Sunset had a population of 184.

== Geography ==
Sunset is located in east-central Crittenden County and is surrounded by the city of Marion. Via Interstate 55, which passes just west of the town, Memphis, Tennessee, is 12 miles (19 km) to the southeast.

According to the United States Census Bureau, the town has a total area of 0.20 square miles (0.53 km^{2}), all land.

== Demographics ==
Historical population
Census	Pop.	Note	%±
1980	582		—
1990	571		−1.9%
2000	348		−39.1%
2010	198		−43.1%
2020	184		−7.1%
2025 (est.)	161	▼	−12.5%
U.S. Decennial Census

=== 2020 Census ===
Sunset, Arkansas – Racial and ethnic composition Note: the US Census treats Hispanic/Latino as an ethnic category. This table excludes Latinos from the racial categories and assigns them to a separate category. Hispanics/Latinos may be of any race.
Race / Ethnicity (NH = Non-Hispanic)	Pop 2000	Pop 2010	Pop 2020	% 2000	% 2010	% 2020
White alone (NH)	17	8	5	4.89%	4.04%	2.72%
Black or African American alone (NH)	313	182	64	89.94%	91.92%	89.13%
Native American or Alaska Native alone (NH)	0	0	0	0.00%	0.00%	0.00%
Asian alone (NH)	0	0	1	0.00%	0.00%	0.54%
Pacific Islander alone (NH)	0	0	0	0.00%	0.00%	0.00%
Other race alone (NH)	0	0	1	0.00%	0.00%	0.54%
Mixed race or Multiracial (NH)	4	2	8	1.15%	1.01%	4.35%
Hispanic or Latino (any race)	14	6	5	4.02%	3.03%	2.72%
Total	348	198	184	100.00%	100.00%	100.00%

=== 2000 census ===
As of the census of 2000, there were 348 people, 135 households, and 85 families residing in the city. The population density was 1,676.8 inhabitants per square mile (647.4/km^{2}). There were 156 housing units at an average density of 751.7 per square mile (290.2/km^{2}). The racial makeup of the city was 4.89% White, 91.09% Black or African American, 2.87% from other races, and 1.15% from two or more races. 4.02% of the population were Hispanic or Latino of any race.

There were 135 households, out of which 26.7% had children under the age of 18 living with them, 22.2% were married couples living together, 34.8% had a female householder with no husband present, and 37.0% were non-families. 33.3% of all households were made up of individuals, and 13.3% had someone living alone who was 65 years of age or older. The average household size was 2.58 and the average family size was 3.35.

In the city the population was spread out, with 29.6% under the age of 18, 8.0% from 18 to 24, 25.6% from 25 to 44, 20.7% from 45 to 64, and 16.1% who were 65 years of age or older. The median age was 37 years. For every 100 females, there were 87.1 males. For every 100 females age 18 and over, there were 84.2 males.

The median income for a household in the city was $17,788, and the median income for a family was $17,250. Males had a median income of $21,750 versus $20,625 for females. The per capita income for the city was $7,766. About 44.4% of families and 49.9% of the population were below the poverty line, including 79.6% of those under age 18 and 27.9% of those age 65 or over.

== Education ==
Sunset is in the Marion School District. Its comprehensive high school is Marion High School.

== Gallery ==
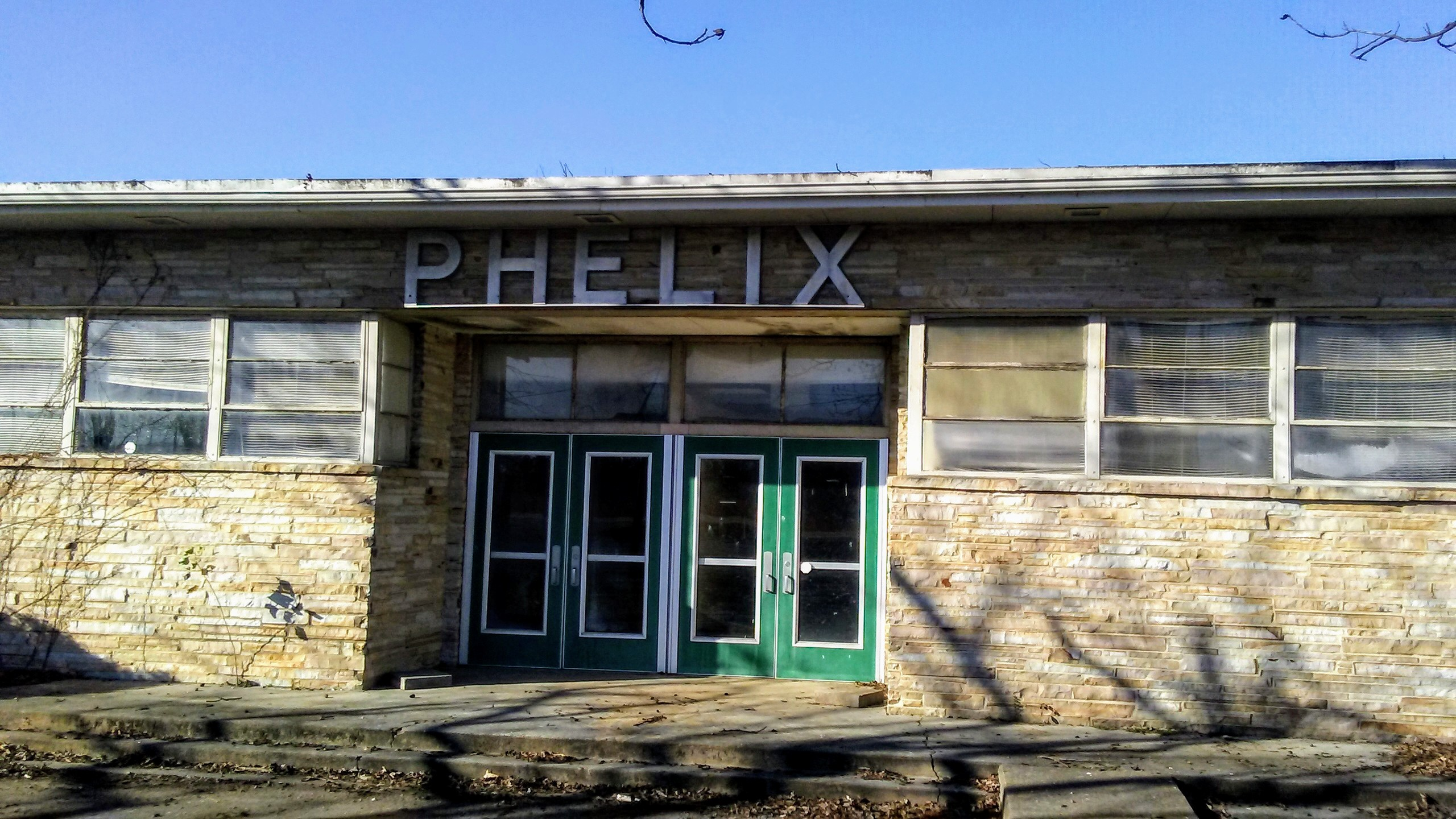
Phelix School, Formerly Marion Colored School Sunset, Arkansas

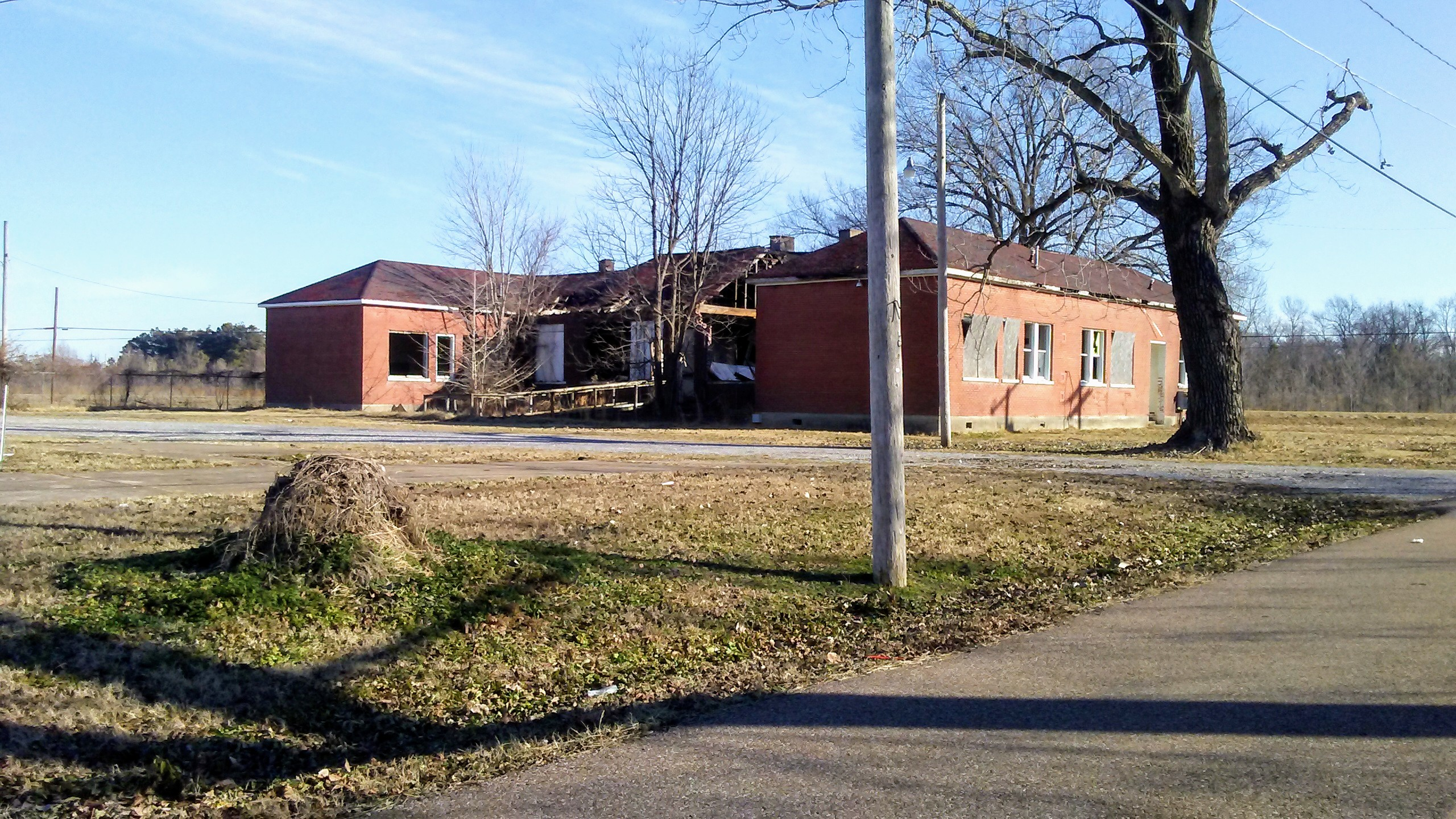
Phelix School - Formerly Marion Colored School, Sunset Arkansas
