= Crittenden County, Arkansas =

County in Arkansas, United States

- County
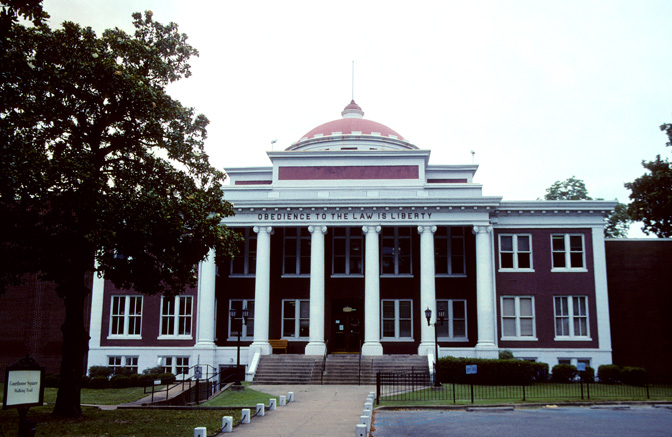
- Crittenden County Courthouse in Marion

- Location within the U.S. state of Arkansas
- Coordinates: 35°14′N 90°18′W
- Country: United States
- State: Arkansas
- Founded: October 22, 1825
- Named for: Robert Crittenden
- Seat: Marion
- Largest city: West Memphis

Area
  - Total: 636 sq mi (1,650 km^{2})
  - Land: 610 sq mi (1,600 km^{2})
  - Water: 27 sq mi (70 km^{2}) 4.2%

Population (2020)
  - Total: 48,163
  - Estimate (2025): 46,210 ▼
  - Density: 79/sq mi (30/km^{2})
- Time zone: UTC−6 (Central)
  - Summer (DST): UTC−5 (CDT)
- Congressional district: 1st
- Website: https://www.crittendencountyar.org/

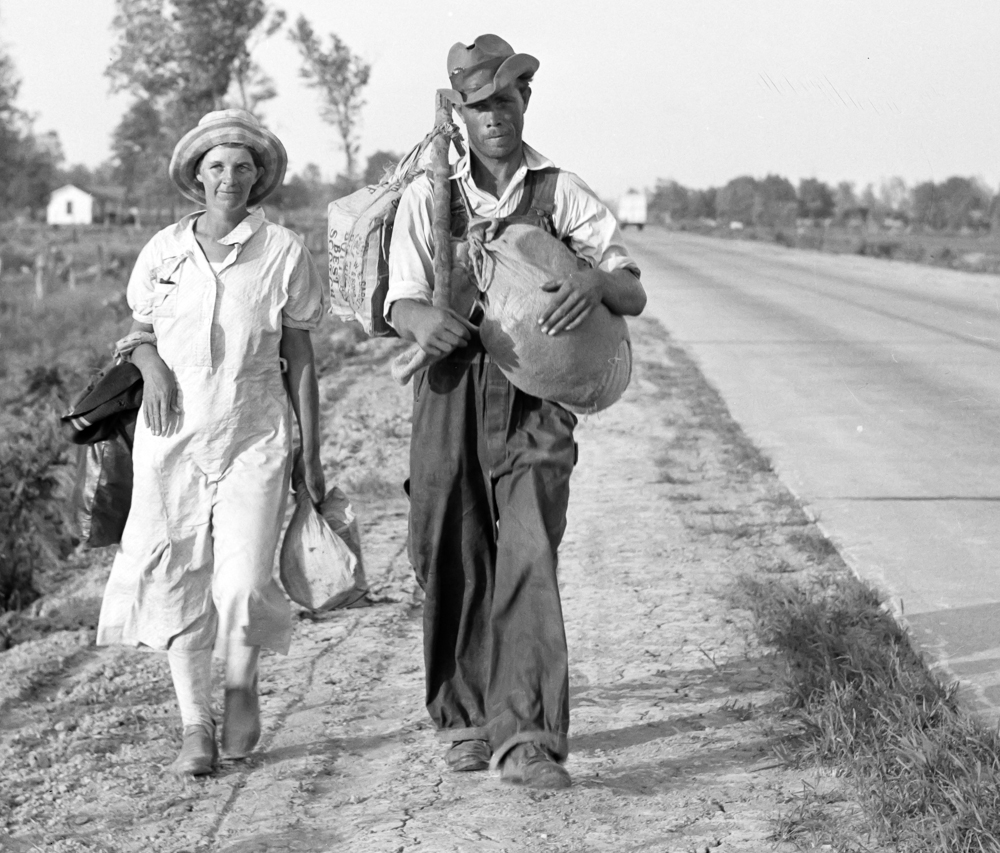
Cotton workers on the road, carrying all they possess in the world during the Great Depression. Crittenden County, Arkansas, 1936.

Crittenden County is a county located in the U.S. state of Arkansas. As of the 2020 census, the population was 48,163. The county seat is Marion, and the largest city is West Memphis. Crittenden County is part of the Memphis, TN-MS-AR Metropolitan Statistical Area. Most of the county's media comes from Memphis, although some Little Rock TV (Arkansas Educational Television Network, KATV) is imported by Comcast Cable. It lies within Arkansas's 1st congressional district.

== History ==
Located in the Arkansas Delta, Crittenden County is Arkansas's 12th county, formed October 22, 1825, and named for Robert Crittenden, the first Secretary of the Arkansas Territory.

The legislature selected the (now extant) community of Greenock as the first county seat, and court was first held there in the home of William Lloyd in June 1826. Greenock served as the county seat for almost a decade before it the seat was moved to Marion.

== Geography ==
According to the U.S. Census Bureau, the county has a total area of 636 square miles (1,650 km^{2}), of which 610 square miles (1,600 km^{2}) is land and 27 square miles (70 km^{2}) (4.2%) is water.

=== Adjacent counties ===
- Mississippi County (northeast)
- Tipton County, Tennessee (east)
- Shelby County, Tennessee (east)
- DeSoto County, Mississippi (southeast)
- Tunica County, Mississippi (south)
- Lee County (southwest)
- St. Francis County (west)
- Cross County (west)
- Poinsett County (northwest)

=== National protected area ===
- Wapanocca National Wildlife Refuge

== Demographics ==
Historical population
Census	Pop.	Note	%±
1830	1,272		—
1840	1,561		22.7%
1850	2,648		69.6%
1860	4,920		85.8%
1870	3,831		−22.1%
1880	9,415		145.8%
1890	13,940		48.1%
1900	14,529		4.2%
1910	22,447		54.5%
1920	29,309		30.6%
1930	39,717		35.5%
1940	42,473		6.9%
1950	47,184		11.1%
1960	47,564		0.8%
1970	48,106		1.1%
1980	49,499		2.9%
1990	49,939		0.9%
2000	50,866		1.9%
2010	50,902		0.1%
2020	48,163		−5.4%
2025 (est.)	46,210	▼	−4.1%
U.S. Decennial Census; 1790–1960 1900–1990; 1990–2000 2010

=== Racial and ethnic composition ===
Crittenden County, Arkansas – Racial and ethnic composition Note: the US Census treats Hispanic/Latino as an ethnic category. This table excludes Latinos from the racial categories and assigns them to a separate category. Hispanics/Latinos may be of any race.
Race / Ethnicity (NH = Non-Hispanic)	Pop 1980	Pop 1990	Pop 2000	Pop 2010	Pop 2020	% 1980	% 1990	% 2000	% 2010	% 2020
White alone (NH)	27,767	27,988	25,643	23,028	18,948	56.10%	56.04%	50.41%	45.24%	39.34%
Black or African American alone (NH)	20,923	21,334	23,828	25,953	25,804	42.27%	42.72%	46.84%	50.99%	53.58%
Native American or Alaska Native alone (NH)	80	89	121	120	115	0.16%	0.18%	0.24%	0.24%	0.24%
Asian alone (NH)	139	180	236	301	322	0.28%	0.36%	0.46%	0.59%	0.67%
Native Hawaiian or Pacific Islander alone (NH)	x	x	11	6	17	x	x	0.02%	0.01%	0.04%
Other race alone (NH)	0	12	28	15	89	0.00%	0.02%	0.06%	0.03%	0.18%
Mixed race or Multiracial (NH)	x	x	279	465	1,440	x	x	0.55%	0.91%	2.99%
Hispanic or Latino (any race)	590	336	720	1,014	1,428	1.19%	0.67%	1.42%	1.99%	2.96%
Total	49,499	49,939	50,866	50,902	48,163	100.00%	100.00%	100.00%	100.00%	100.00%

=== 2020 census ===
As of the 2020 census, the county had a population of 48,163. The median age was 37.7 years. 26.2% of residents were under the age of 18 and 15.0% of residents were 65 years of age or older. For every 100 females there were 88.8 males, and for every 100 females age 18 and over there were 84.3 males age 18 and over.

The racial makeup of the county was 40.0% White, 53.8% Black or African American, 0.3% American Indian and Alaska Native, 0.7% Asian, <0.1% Native Hawaiian and Pacific Islander, 1.4% from some other race, and 3.8% from two or more races. Hispanic or Latino residents of any race comprised 3.0% of the population.

81.6% of residents lived in urban areas, while 18.4% lived in rural areas.

There were 18,885 households in the county, of which 34.1% had children under the age of 18 living in them. Of all households, 35.1% were married-couple households, 20.2% were households with a male householder and no spouse or partner present, and 38.4% were households with a female householder and no spouse or partner present. About 29.5% of all households were made up of individuals and 11.2% had someone living alone who was 65 years of age or older.

There were 21,291 housing units, of which 11.3% were vacant. Among occupied housing units, 54.8% were owner-occupied and 45.2% were renter-occupied. The homeowner vacancy rate was 1.4% and the rental vacancy rate was 8.3%.

=== 2010 census ===
As of the 2010 census, there were 50,902 people living in the county. 51.2% were Black or African American, 46.1% White, 0.6% Asian, 0.3% Native American, 0.8% of some other race and 1.1% of two or more races. 2.0% were Hispanic or Latino (of any race).

=== 2000 census ===
As of the 2000 census, there were 50,866 people, 18,471 households, and 13,373 families living in the county. The population density was 83 inhabitants per square mile (32/km^{2}). There were 20,507 housing units at an average density of 34 per square mile (13/km^{2}). The racial makeup of the county was 50.91% White, 47.05% Black or African American, 0.24% Native American, 0.47% Asian, 0.02% Pacific Islander, 0.66% from other races, and 0.64% from two or more races. 1.42% of the population were Hispanic or Latino of any race.

There were 18,471 households, out of which 37.40% had children under the age of 18 living with them, 45.80% were married couples living together, 21.30% had a female householder with no husband present, and 27.60% were non-families. 23.70% of all households were made up of individuals, and 8.00% had someone living alone who was 65 years of age or older. The average household size was 2.72 and the average family size was 3.23.

In the county, the population was spread out, with 31.10% under the age of 18, 9.40% from 18 to 24, 29.10% from 25 to 44, 20.50% from 45 to 64, and 9.90% who were 65 years of age or older. The median age was 32 years. For every 100 females there were 91.00 males. For every 100 females age 18 and over, there were 85.00 males.

The median income for a household in the county was $30,109, and the median income for a family was $34,982. Males had a median income of $31,299 versus $21,783 for females. The per capita income for the county was $14,424. About 21.00% of families and 25.30% of the population were below the poverty line, including 35.30% of those under age 18 and 23.70% of those age 65 or over.

== Education ==
=== Elementary and secondary education ===
Public school districts include:

- Earle School District, which operates Earle High School
- Marion School District, which operates Marion High School
- West Memphis School District, which operates Academies of West Memphis

Former school districts:

- Crawfordsville School District
- Hughes School District, which operated Hughes High School
- Turrell School District

The Old Earle High School is listed on the National Register of Historic Places.

=== Postsecondary education ===
Crittenden County is served by Arkansas State University Mid-South in West Memphis. The college offers bachelor's and master's degree programs in conjunction with Arkansas State University, The University of Arkansas, The University of Central Arkansas, Arkansas Tech University and Franklin University.

== Healthcare ==
Crittenden County was served by 152 Bed Crittenden Regional Hospital in West Memphis until late August 2014. The hospital operated a number of outpatient clinics in Marion and West Memphis and a Pediatric Dental Clinic in cooperation with the UT Dental School. Crittenden Regional Hospital has closed the ER and permanently closed on September 7, 2014.

West Memphis & Crittenden County are now served by Baptist Memorial Hospital-Crittenden, an 11-bed, 65,000-square-foot acute care facility. The facility was opened December 13, 2018. The Arkansas Department of Health operates a clinic in West Memphis.

A number of private clinics also operate in Marion and West Memphis.

== Government and politics ==
=== Government ===
The county government is a constitutional body granted specific powers by the Constitution of Arkansas and the Arkansas Code. The quorum court is the legislative branch of the county government and controls all spending and revenue collection. Representatives are called justices of the peace and are elected from county districts every even-numbered year. The number of districts in a county vary from nine to fifteen, and district boundaries are drawn by the county election commission. The Crittenden County Quorum Court has eleven members. Presiding over quorum court meetings is the county judge, who serves as the chief executive officer of the county. The county judge is elected at-large and does not vote in quorum court business, although capable of vetoing quorum court decisions.

Crittenden County, Arkansas Elected countywide officials
Position	Officeholder	Party
County Judge	Woody Wheeless	Democratic
County Clerk	Paula Brown	Democratic
Circuit Clerk	Terry Hawkins	Democratic
Sheriff	Michael Allen	Democratic
Treasurer	Matt Thompson	Democratic
Collector	Ellen Foote	Democratic
Assessor	Kimberly Hollowell	Democratic
Coroner	Bill Wolfe	Democratic

The composition of the Quorum Court after the 2024 elections is 8 Democrats and 3 Republicans. Justices of the Peace (members) of the Quorum Court following the elections are:

- District 1: Vickie Miles (D)
- District 2: Albert Marconi (R)
- District 3: Stacy Allen (D)
- District 4: Tamara Hood (D)
- District 5: Marco McClendon (D)
- District 6: Thomas A. Dill (D)
- District 7: Rickey McCauley (D)
- District 8: Sidney Hardin (R)
- District 9: Kenneth Cross (D)
- District 10: Bradley Moore (R)
- District 11: Lisa Vickers O'Neil (D)

Additionally, the townships of Crittenden County are entitled to elect their own respective constables, as set forth by the Constitution of Arkansas. Constables are largely of historical significance as they were used to keep the peace in rural areas when travel was more difficult. The township constables as of the 2024 elections are:

- Black Oak: Scott D. Fraley (D)
- Jackson: Steve Johnson (D)
- Jasper: Stanley Griffin (D)
- Lucas: Roy O. Harness III (D)
- Mississippi: Eddie West (D)

=== Politics ===
United States presidential election results for Crittenden County, Arkansas
Year	Republican		Democratic		Third party(ies)	
Year	No.	%	No.	%	No.	%
1836	27	41.54%	38	58.46%	0	0.00%
1840	95	57.23%	71	42.77%	0	0.00%
1844	109	45.80%	129	54.20%	0	0.00%
1848	104	60.47%	68	39.53%	0	0.00%
1852	95	49.48%	97	50.52%	0	0.00%
1860	0	0.00%	173	33.40%	345	66.60%
1868	229	42.49%	310	57.51%	0	0.00%
1872	1,887	86.28%	300	13.72%	0	0.00%
1876	1,059	79.27%	277	20.73%	0	0.00%
1880	914	79.27%	239	20.73%	0	0.00%
1884	773	81.71%	173	18.29%	0	0.00%
1888	1,055	77.29%	310	22.71%	0	0.00%
1892	706	65.07%	353	32.53%	26	2.40%
1896	258	28.89%	625	69.99%	10	1.12%
1900	381	53.21%	327	45.67%	8	1.12%
1904	412	54.14%	344	45.20%	5	0.66%
1908	382	46.59%	428	52.20%	10	1.22%
1912	89	11.17%	423	53.07%	285	35.76%
1916	91	13.91%	563	86.09%	0	0.00%
1920	167	15.46%	905	83.80%	8	0.74%
1924	77	8.81%	777	88.90%	20	2.29%
1928	304	15.68%	1,635	84.32%	0	0.00%
1932	37	1.51%	2,411	98.25%	6	0.24%
1936	22	1.17%	1,858	98.83%	0	0.00%
1940	72	3.53%	1,966	96.37%	2	0.10%
1944	372	19.38%	1,548	80.63%	0	0.00%
1948	137	5.73%	594	24.83%	1,661	69.44%
1952	1,865	38.34%	2,982	61.31%	17	0.35%
1956	2,476	50.81%	2,120	43.51%	277	5.68%
1960	2,234	43.56%	2,679	52.24%	215	4.19%
1964	4,065	48.96%	4,168	50.20%	69	0.83%
1968	2,454	23.18%	3,475	32.83%	4,657	43.99%
1972	7,971	71.06%	3,246	28.94%	0	0.00%
1976	5,202	38.63%	8,249	61.26%	14	0.10%
1980	6,248	45.20%	7,022	50.80%	553	4.00%
1984	6,663	47.82%	6,520	46.79%	751	5.39%
1988	7,441	51.73%	6,702	46.59%	241	1.68%
1992	5,910	34.55%	9,683	56.60%	1,515	8.86%
1996	4,673	32.83%	8,415	59.11%	1,148	8.06%
2000	5,857	44.26%	7,224	54.59%	153	1.16%
2004	6,930	45.29%	8,277	54.10%	93	0.61%
2008	7,650	41.91%	10,330	56.59%	275	1.51%
2012	6,998	41.86%	9,487	56.75%	231	1.38%
2016	6,964	43.66%	8,410	52.72%	578	3.62%
2020	7,333	44.80%	8,514	52.02%	520	3.18%
2024	7,028	47.87%	7,362	50.15%	291	1.98%

Crittenden County has been a longtime Democratic stronghold, which begins to be more relevant as the state of Arkansas becomes more entrenched in the Republican Party and Black voters in the Mississippi Delta have become one of the last bases of Democratic support in the state. While the county's closeness to the larger Memphis area has led to a relatively stable population, the sharp rightward turn of Arkansas politically has led to the margins in this county to shrink with each presidential election.

== Transportation ==
=== Major highways ===
- I-40
- I-55
- I-555
- US 61
- US 64
- US 70
- US 78
- US 79
- AR 38
- AR 42
- AR 50
- AR 77
- AR 118
- AR 131
- AR 147
- AR 149
- AR 184
- AR 191
- AR 218
- AR 816

=== Airports ===
Crittenden County is served by the West Memphis Municipal Airport (KAWM), a General Aviation facility with a Control Tower and Instrument Landing capabilities. General DeWitt Spain Airport is a civil aviation airport just north of downtown Memphis.

The Memphis International Airport is nearby and provides commercial aviation through numerous carriers and is the international cargo hub for FedEx.

=== Rail ===
Union Pacific operates a 600 Acre intermodal facility west of Marion, Arkansas. BNSF Railway also operates a yard in Marion.

Limited Passenger Rail is available on Amtrak at Memphis Central Station in nearby Memphis. The City of New Orleans runs twice daily on a north–south route from Chicago to New Orleans.

=== Water ===
Crittenden County and West Memphis jointly operate a port on the Mississippi River. The International Port of Memphis lies just across the Mississippi River via Interstate 55. The International Port of Memphis is the 4th largest inland port in the United States.

== Communities ==
=== Cities ===
- Earle
- Marion (county seat)
- Turrell
- West Memphis

=== Towns ===
- Anthonyville
- Crawfordsville
- Clarkedale
- Edmondson
- Gilmore
- Horseshoe Lake
- Jennette
- Jericho
- Sunset

=== Townships ===
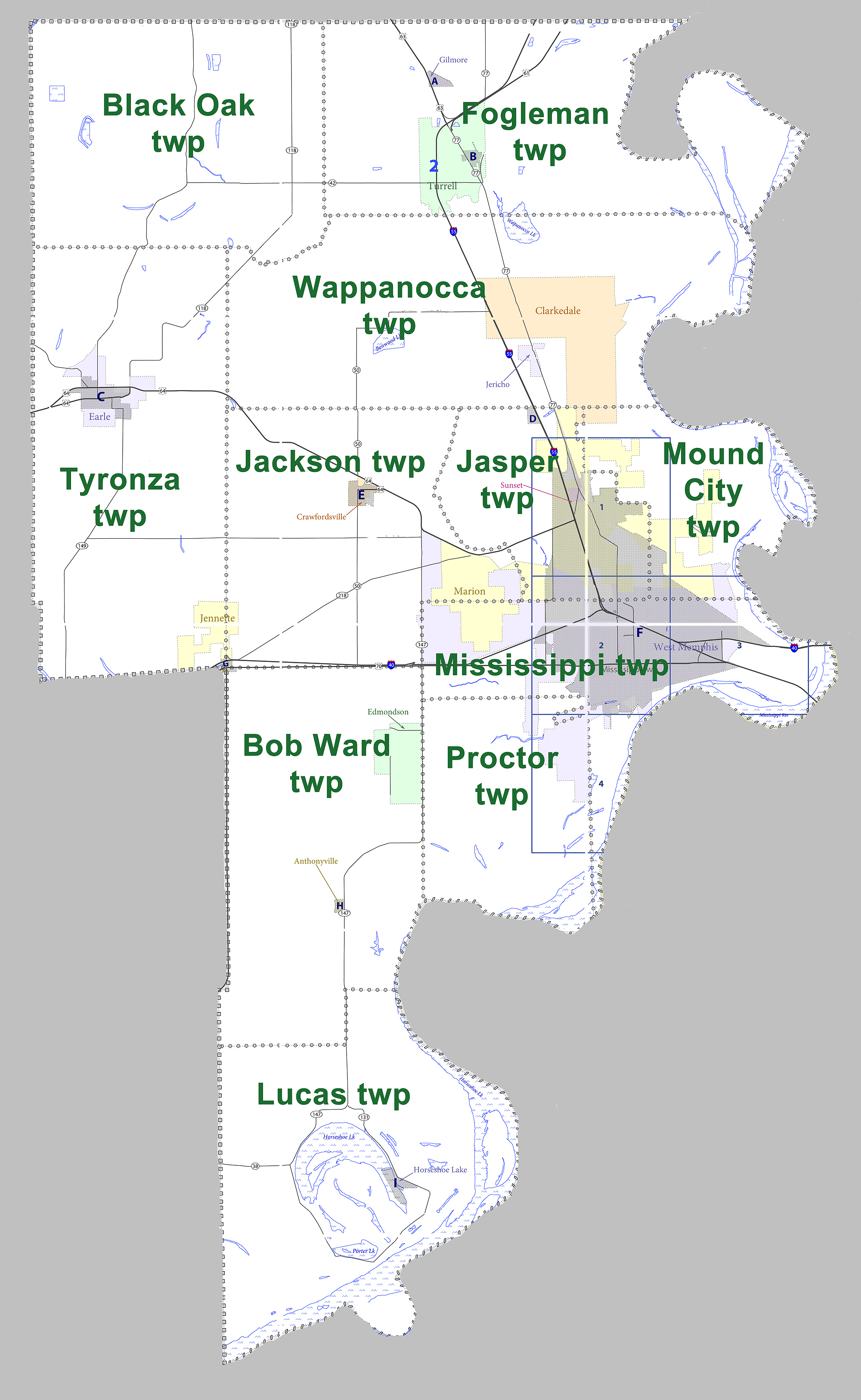
Townships in Crittenden County, Arkansas as of 2010

Townships in Arkansas are the divisions of a county. Each township includes unincorporated areas; some may have incorporated cities or towns within part of their boundaries. Arkansas townships have limited purposes in modern times. However, the United States census does list Arkansas population based on townships (sometimes referred to as "county subdivisions" or "minor civil divisions"). Townships are also of value for historical purposes in terms of genealogical research. Each town or city is within one or more townships in an Arkansas county based on census maps and publications. The townships of Crittenden County are listed below; listed in parentheses are the cities, towns, and/or census-designated places that are fully or partially inside the township.

- Black Oak
- Bob Ward (Anthonyville, Edmondson, small part of Jennette)
- Fogleman (Gilmore, Turrell)
- Jackson (Crawfordsville, part of Marion, part of West Memphis small part of Jennette)
- Jasper (Sunset, most of Marion, part of West Memphis, small part of Clarkedale)
- Lucas (Horseshoe Lake)
- Mississippi (most of West Memphis, part of Marion)
- Mound City (part of Marion, part of West Memphis, small part of Clarkedale)
- Proctor (part of West Memphis)
- Tyronza (Earle, most of Jennette)
- Wappanocca (Jericho, most of Clarkedale)

== See also ==
- List of lakes in Crittenden County, Arkansas
- National Register of Historic Places listings in Crittenden County, Arkansas
