= Old Turrell City Hall =

- U.S. National Register of Historic Places
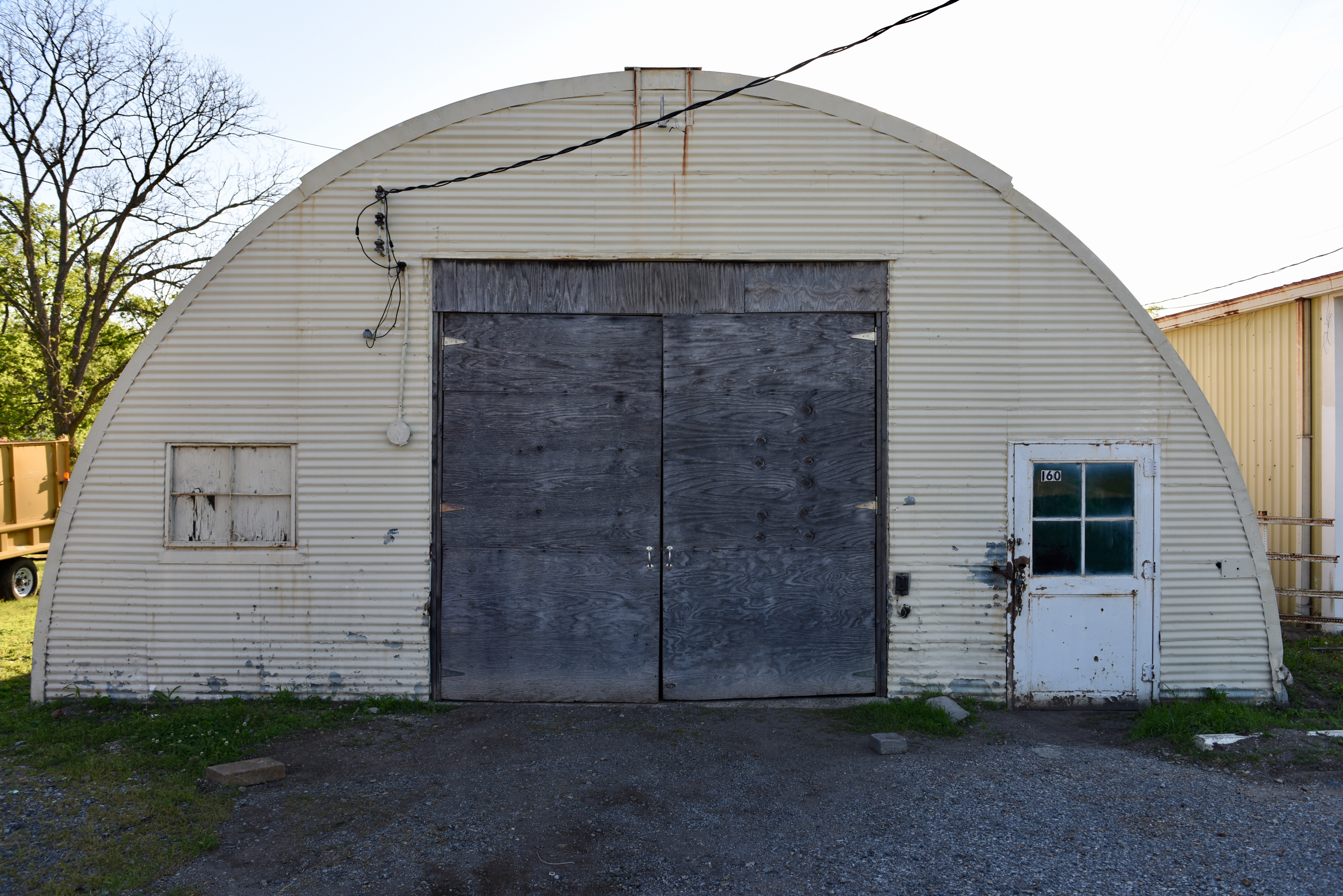

- Location within Arkansas Location within the United States
- Location: 160 Eureka St. Turrell, Arkansas
- Coordinates: 35°22′42″N 90°15′21″W
- Area: Less than 1 acre (0.40 ha)
- Built: 1955
- Architectural style: Quonset hut
- NRHP reference No.: 07000962
- Added to NRHP: September 19, 2007

The Old Turrell City Hall is a historic government building at 160 Eureka Street in Turrell, Arkansas. Built c. 1955, it is a classic example of a Quonset Hut, a form popularized during World War II for military uses. It has corrugated metal walls and ceiling, and is set on a concrete foundation. Its main facade, in one of the vertical ends, has a centrally-positioned garage door, with a sash window to the left, and a pedestrian entrance to the right. The building was used as city hall until 1968, when the present hall was built.

The building was listed on the National Register of Historic Places in 2007.

== See also ==
- National Register of Historic Places listings in Crittenden County, Arkansas
