= West Memphis Municipal Airport =

- IATA: AWM; ICAO: KAWM; FAA LID: AWM

Summary
- Airport type: Public
- Owner: City of West Memphis
- Serves: Memphis metropolitan area
- Location: West Memphis, Arkansas
- Elevation AMSL: 212 ft (65 m)
- Coordinates: 35°08′06″N 090°14′04″W

Map
- Location of airport in Arkansas AWM (the United States)

Runways
Direction	Length		Surface
Direction	ft	m	Surface
17/35	6,003	1,830	Concrete

Statistics (2021)
- Aircraft operations: 50,200
- Based aircraft: 92
- Source: Federal Aviation Administration

West Memphis Municipal Airport (IATA: AWM, ICAO: KAWM, FAA LID: AWM) is a city-owned public-use airport located three miles (5 km) west of the central business district of West Memphis, in Crittenden County, Arkansas, United States. The airport is 10 nmi (19 km) southwest of General DeWitt Spain Airport in Memphis, Tennessee.

According to the FAA's National Plan of Integrated Airport Systems for 2007–2011, West Memphis Municipal Airport is categorized as a reliever airport.

== Facilities and aircraft ==
West Memphis Municipal Airport covers an area of 494 acres (200 ha) which contains one concrete paved runway (17/35) measuring 6,003 x 100 ft (1,830 x 30 m). For the 12-month period ending October 31, 2021, the airport had 50,200 aircraft operations, an average of 137 per day: 100% general aviation and <1% military. There were 92 aircraft based at this airport: 67 single-engine, 20 multi-engine, 4 jet, and 1 helicopter.

== See also ==
- List of airports in Arkansas
