= Jericho, Arkansas =

- Town
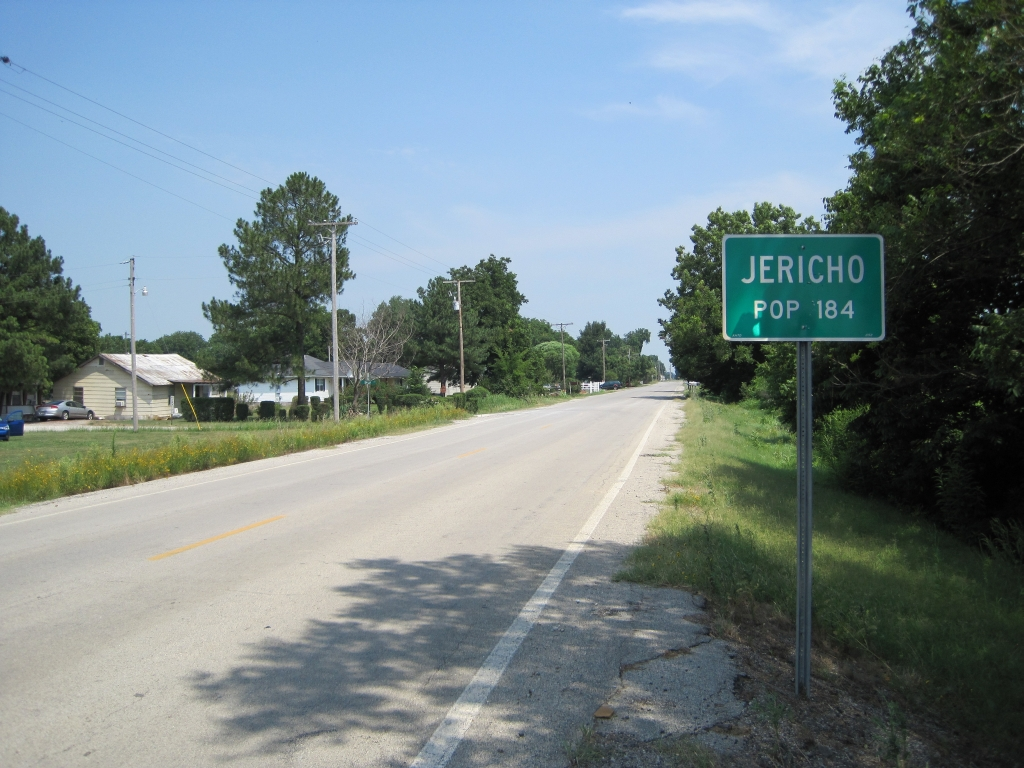
- Jericho, AR

- Location of Jericho in Crittenden County, Arkansas.
- Coordinates: 35°17′16″N 90°13′50″W
- Country: United States
- State: Arkansas
- County: Crittenden

Area
  - Total: 0.31 sq mi (0.79 km^{2})
  - Land: 0.31 sq mi (0.79 km^{2})
  - Water: 0 sq mi (0.00 km^{2})
- Elevation: 226 ft (69 m)

Population (2020)
  - Total: 98
  - Estimate (2025): 96 ▼
  - Density: 319.5/sq mi (123.36/km^{2})
- Time zone: UTC-6 (Central (CST))
  - Summer (DST): UTC-5 (CDT)
- ZIP code: 72327
- Area code: 870
- FIPS code: 05-35140
- GNIS feature ID: 2405915

Jericho is a town in Crittenden County, Arkansas, United States. As of the 2020 census, Jericho had a population of 98.

== Geography ==
Jericho is located in northern Crittenden County at 35°17′12″N 90°13′39″W. It lies along Arkansas Highway 77, 10 miles (16 km) north of West Memphis.

According to the United States Census Bureau, the town has a total area of 0.46 square miles (1.2 km^{2}), all land.

== Demographics ==
Historical population
Census	Pop.	Note	%±
1990	210		—
2000	184		−12.4%
2010	119		−35.3%
2020	98		−17.6%
2025 (est.)	96	▼	−2.0%
U.S. Decennial Census

=== 2020 census ===
Jericho town, Arkansas – Racial and ethnic composition Note: the US Census treats Hispanic/Latino as an ethnic category. This table excludes Latinos from the racial categories and assigns them to a separate category. Hispanics/Latinos may be of any race.
Race / Ethnicity (NH = Non-Hispanic)	Pop 2000	Pop 2010	Pop 2020	% 2000	% 2010	% 2020
White alone (NH)	8	2	1	4.35%	1.68%	1.02%
Black or African American alone (NH)	170	116	92	93.29%	97.48%	93.88%
Native American or Alaska Native alone (NH)	0	0	0	0.00%	0.00%	0.00%
Asian alone (NH)	0	0	0	0.00%	0.00%	0.00%
Native Hawaiian or Pacific Islander alone (NH)	0	0	0	0.00%	0.00%	0.00%
Other Race alone (NH)	0	0	0	0.00%	0.00%	0.00%
Mixed race or Multiracial (NH)	1	0	4	0.54%	0.00%	4.08%
Hispanic or Latino (any race)	5	1	1	2.72%	0.84%	1.02%
Total	184	119	98	100.00%	100.00%	100.00%

As of the census of 2000, there were 184 people, 66 households, and 46 families residing in the town. The population density was 151.2 people/km^{2} (392 people/mi^{2}). There were 73 housing units at an average density of 60.0 units/km^{2} (155 units/mi^{2}). The racial makeup of the town was 4.35% White, 92.93% Black or African American, 0.54% from other races, and 2.17% from two or more races. 2.72% of the population were Hispanic or Latino of any race.

There were 66 households, out of which 19.7% had children under the age of 18 living with them, 40.9% were married couples living together, 27.3% had a female householder with no husband present, and 30.3% were non-families. 27.3% of all households were made up of individuals, and 13.6% had someone living alone who was 65 years of age or older. The average household size was 2.79 and the average family size was 3.50.

In the town, the population was spread out, with 25.5% under the age of 18, 6.5% from 18 to 24, 25.5% from 25 to 44, 23.4% from 45 to 64, and 19.0% who were 65 years of age or older. The median age was 40 years. For every 100 females, there were 75.2 males. For every 100 females age 18 and over, there were 77.9 males.

The median income for a household in the town was $20,625, and the median income for a family was $28,214. Males had a median income of $22,250 versus $13,125 for females. The per capita income for the town was $8,577. About 25.0% of families and 25.4% of the population were below the poverty line, including 20.0% of those under the age of eighteen and 56.8% of those 65 or over.

== Education ==
Jericho is in the Marion School District. Its comprehensive high school is Marion High School.
