= Clarkedale, Arkansas =

- City
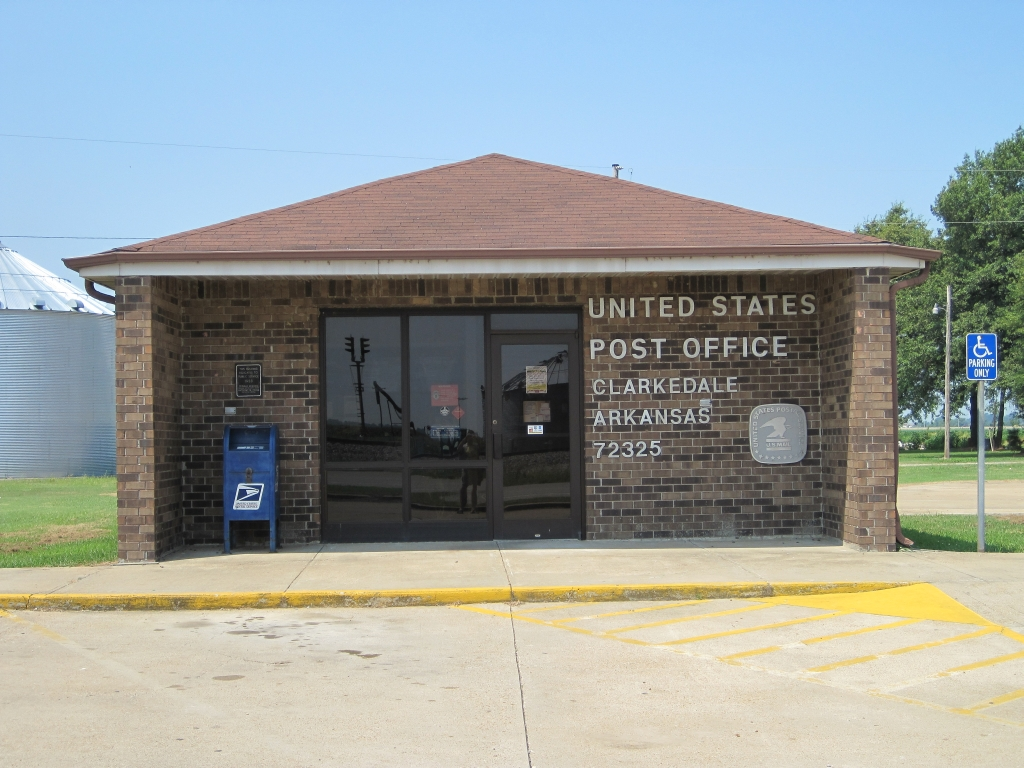
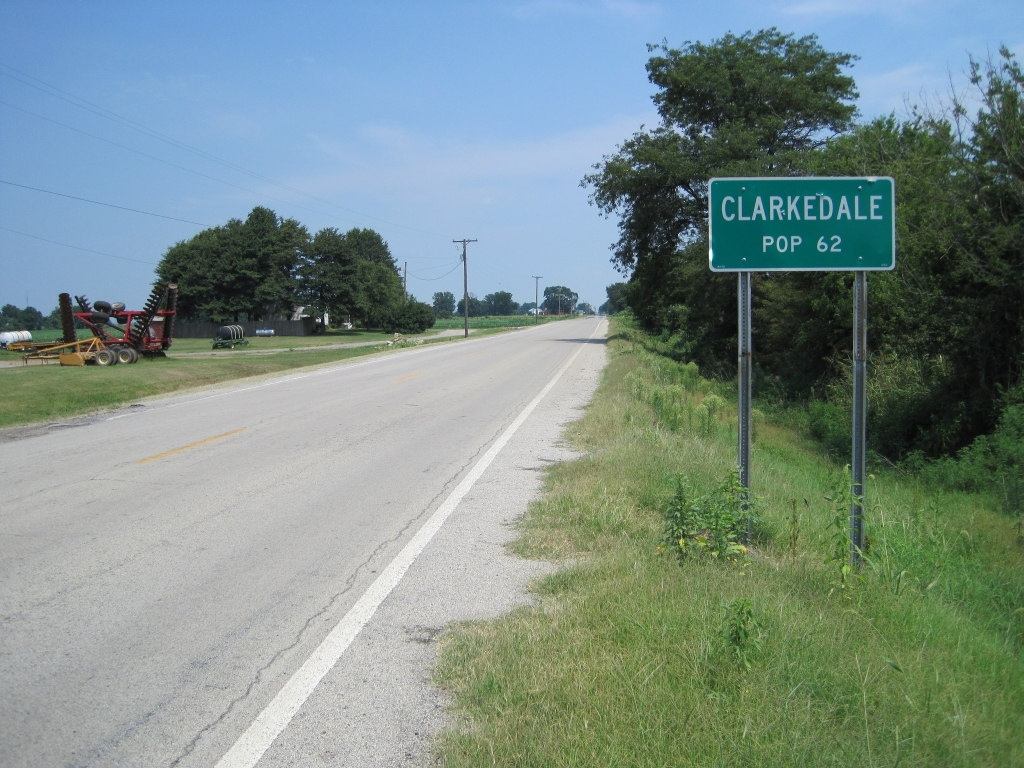
- Post office Clarkedale sign on highway

- Location of Clarkedale in Crittenden County, Arkansas.

- Location within Arkansas
- Coordinates: 35°18′23″N 90°14′10″W
- Country: United States
- State: Arkansas
- County: Crittenden

Area
  - Total: 11.44 sq mi (29.62 km^{2})
  - Land: 11.44 sq mi (29.62 km^{2})
  - Water: 0 sq mi (0.00 km^{2})
- Elevation: 223 ft (68 m)

Population (2020)
  - Total: 336
  - Estimate (2025): 326 ▼
  - Density: 29.4/sq mi (11.34/km^{2})
- Time zone: UTC-6 (Central (CST))
  - Summer (DST): UTC-5 (CDT)
- ZIP code: 72325
- Area code: 870
- FIPS code: 05-14050
- GNIS feature ID: 2404055

Clarkedale is a town in Crittenden County, Arkansas, United States. Per the 2020 census, the population was 336. Clarkedale was incorporated on November 15, 2000.

== Demographics ==
=== 2020 census ===
Clarkedale city, Arkansas– Racial and ethnic composition Note: the U.S. census treats Hispanic/Latino as an ethnic category. This table excludes Latinos from the racial categories and assigns them to a separate category. Hispanics/Latinos may be of any race.
Race / Ethnicity (NH = Non-Hispanic)	Pop 2010	Pop 2020	% 2010	% 2020
White alone (NH)	303	276	81.67%	82.14%
Black or African American alone (NH)	50	29	13.48%	8.63%
Native American or Alaska Native alone (NH)	3	0	0.81%	0.00%
Asian alone (NH)	1	0	0.27%	0.00%
Pacific Islander alone (NH)	0	0	0.00%	0.00%
Other race alone (NH)	0	0	0.00%	0.00%
Mixed race or Multiracial (NH)	2	19	0.54%	5.65%
Hispanic or Latino (any race)	12	12	3.23%	3.57%
Total	371	336	100.00%	100.00%

Historical population
Census	Pop.	Note	%±
2010	371		—
2020	336		−9.4%
2025 (est.)	326	▼	−3.0%
U.S. Decennial Census; 2010 2020

== Education ==
Clarkedale is in the Marion School District. Its comprehensive high school is Marion High School.
