= Wapanocca National Wildlife Refuge =

Wildlife refuge in Crittenden County, Arkansas

- IUCN category IV (habitat/species management area)
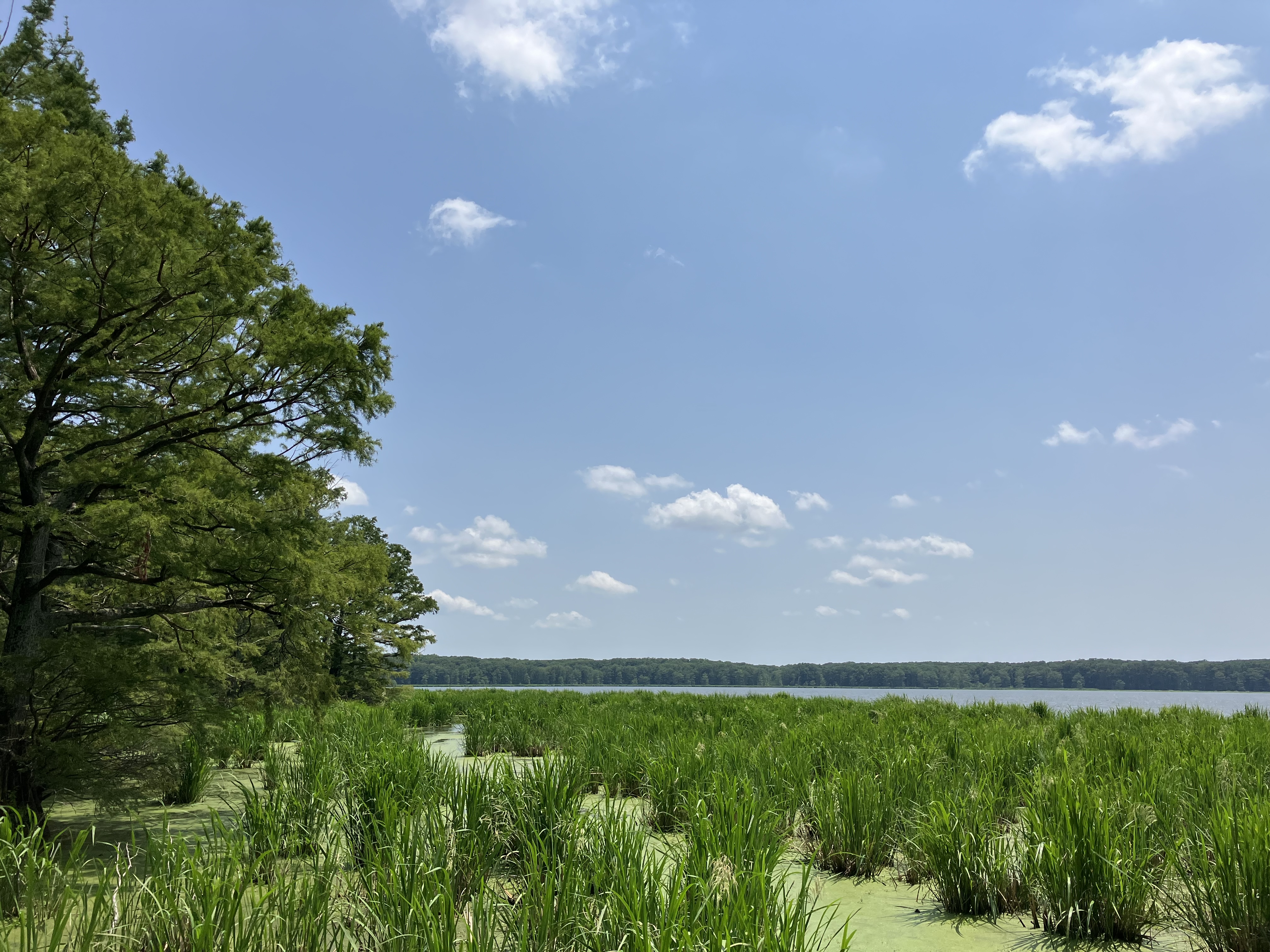
- Wapanocca National Wildlife Refuge

- Location within the United States
- Location: Crittenden County, Arkansas, United States
- Nearest city: Turrell, Arkansas
- Coordinates: 35°20′45″N 90°13′00″W
- Area: 5,484 acres (22.19 km^{2})
- Established: 1961
- Governing body: U.S. Fish and Wildlife Service
- Website: Wapanocca National Wildlife Refuge

The Wapanocca National Wildlife Refuge is a 5,484 acre (22 km^{2}) wildlife refuge in Crittenden County, Arkansas, managed by the United States Fish and Wildlife Service.

Wapanocca National Wildlife Refuge was established in 1961 from land acquired from the former "Wapanocca Outing Club" which was a prestigious hunting club formed in 1886. The refuge is located 3 miles (5 km) west of the Mississippi River near the city of Turrell, Arkansas.

The refuge was once a bend in the Mississippi River. It is a migration stopover for warblers and other neo-tropical birds. The refuge is host to the blue heron, and the common egret as well as the bald eagle. The refuge is a major stopover on the Mississippi Flyway. Wapanocca consists of 600 acres (2.4 km^{2}) of open water, 1,800 acres (7 km^{2}) of swampland, 500 acres (2.0 km^{2}) of bottomland hardwood, 1,200 acres (4.9 km^{2}) of cropland, and 400 acres (1.6 km^{2}) of grassland.
