= Turrell, Arkansas =

- City
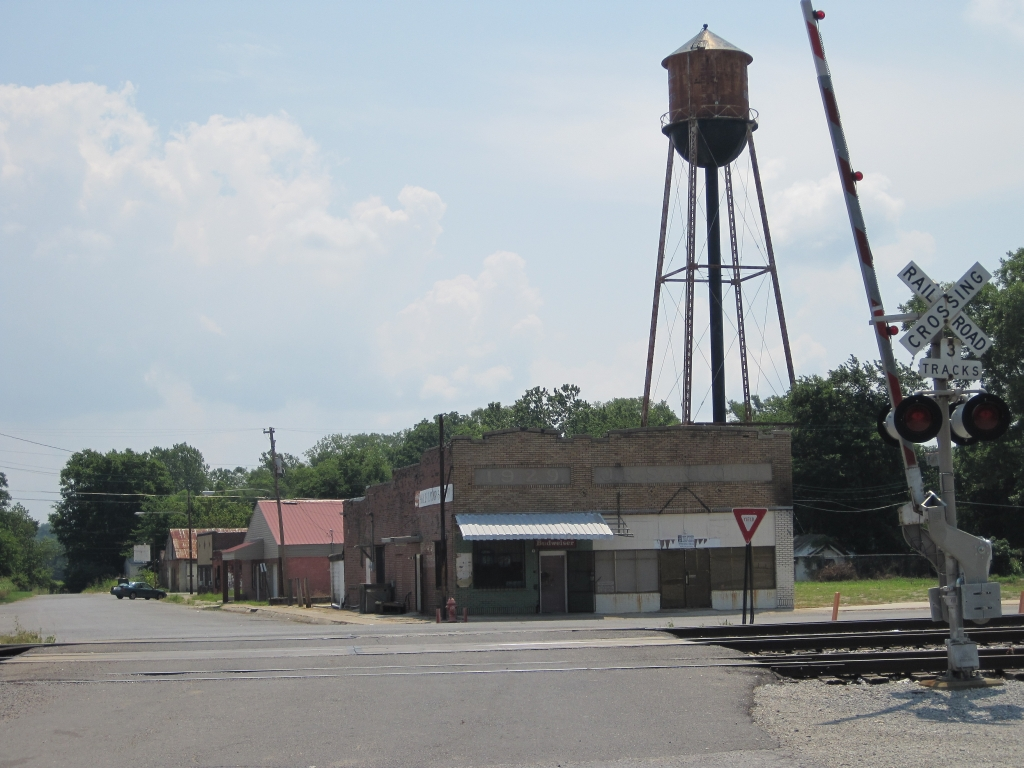
- Downtown Turrell

- Location of Turrell in Crittenden County, Arkansas.
- Coordinates: 35°22′20″N 90°16′17″W
- Country: United States
- State: Arkansas
- County: Crittenden

Area
  - Total: 5.36 sq mi (13.89 km^{2})
  - Land: 5.35 sq mi (13.85 km^{2})
  - Water: 0.019 sq mi (0.05 km^{2})
- Elevation: 220 ft (67 m)

Population (2020)
  - Total: 517
  - Estimate (2025): 488 ▼
  - Density: 96.7/sq mi (37.34/km^{2})
- Time zone: UTC-6 (Central (CST))
  - Summer (DST): UTC-5 (CDT)
- ZIP code: 72384
- Area code: 870
- FIPS code: 05-70430
- GNIS feature ID: 2405613
- Website: cityofturrell.com

Turrell is a city in Crittenden County, Arkansas, United States. Per the 2020 census, the population was 517.

== Geography ==
Turrell is located in northern Crittenden County and is bordered by the town of Gilmore to the north. Turrell is located on Arkansas Highway 77, just southeast of the junction where Interstate 55 and U.S. Routes 61 merge. Prior to 2021, US 63 merged here too. Interstate 55 leads south 24 miles (39 km) to Memphis, Tennessee, and north 42 miles (68 km) to Blytheville, Arkansas, near the Missouri border. US 61/Interstate 555 leads northwest 45 miles (72 km) to Jonesboro.

The Burlington Northern-Santa Fe Railroad runs through Turrell. Two major lines of the Burlington Northern-Santa Fe Springfield Division converge at Turrell (the Thayer South and the River subdivisions), which funnel trains from the Springfield, Missouri, yard and the St. Louis yard, respectively, to Turrell. Once these two lines converge, the trackage then goes to Memphis. The railroad was formerly the St. Louis–San Francisco Railway (better known as the Frisco). The Frisco Railroad was absorbed by the Burlington Northern in 1980.

According to the United States Census Bureau, Turrell has a total area of 5.4 square miles (14.0 km^{2}), of which 0.02 square miles (0.05 km^{2}), or 0.33%, is water.

== Demographics ==
Historical population
Census	Pop.	Note	%±
1930	456		—
1940	515		12.9%
1950	670		30.1%
1960	794		18.5%
1970	783		−1.4%
1980	1,041		33.0%
1990	988		−5.1%
2000	957		−3.1%
2010	615		−35.7%
2020	517		−15.9%
2025 (est.)	488	▼	−5.6%
U.S. Decennial Census; 2010 2020

=== Racial and ethnic composition ===
Turrell city, Arkansas – Racial and ethnic composition Note: the US Census treats Hispanic/Latino as an ethnic category. This table excludes Latinos from the racial categories and assigns them to a separate category. Hispanics/Latinos may be of any race.
Race / Ethnicity (NH = Non-Hispanic)	Pop 2000	Pop 2010	Pop 2020	% 2000	% 2010	% 2020
White alone (NH)	185	87	34	19.33%	14.15%	6.58%
Black or African American alone (NH)	737	523	458	77.01%	85.04%	88.59%
Native American or Alaska Native alone (NH)	1	0	0	0.10%	0.00%	0.00%
Asian alone (NH)	0	0	1	0.00%	0.00%	0.19%
Native Hawaiian or Pacific Islander alone (NH)	0	0	0	0.00%	0.00%	0.00%
Other race alone (NH)	0	0	0	0.00%	0.00%	0.00%
Mixed race or Multiracial (NH)	6	3	12	0.63%	0.49%	2.32%
Hispanic or Latino (any race)	28	2	12	2.93%	0.33%	2.32%
Total	957	615	517	100.00%	100.00%	100.00%

=== 2000 census ===
As of the census of 2000, there were 957 people, 326 households, and 222 families residing in the town. The population density was 176.1 inhabitants per square mile (68.0/km^{2}). There were 357 housing units at an average density of 65.7 per square mile (25.4/km^{2}). The racial makeup of the city was 19.44% White, 78.79% Black or African American, 0.10% Native American, 0.94% from other races, and 0.73% from two or more races. 2.93% of the population were Hispanic or Latino of any race.

There were 326 households, out of which 30.7% had children under the age of 18 living with them, 32.5% were married couples living together, 29.1% had a female householder with no husband present, and 31.9% were non-families. 27.6% of all households were made up of individuals, and 11.7% had someone living alone who was 65 years of age or older. The average household size was 2.94 and the average family size was 3.70.

In the town, the population was spread out, with 34.1% under the age of 18, 8.7% from 18 to 24, 23.6% from 25 to 44, 21.4% from 45 to 64, and 12.2% who were 65 years of age or older. The median age was 33 years. For every 100 females, there were 90.6 males. For every 100 females age 18 and over, there were 79.3 males.

The median income for a household in the town was $15,000, and the median income for a family was $21,750. Males had a median income of $26,250 versus $14,861 for females. The per capita income for the town was $8,908. About 38.1% of families and 41.0% of the population were below the poverty line, including 50.8% of those under age 18 and 30.4% of those age 65 or over.

== Education ==
Public education for early childhood, elementary and secondary school students is primarily provided by the Marion School District, which leads to graduation from Marion High School.

On July 1, 2010, the former Turrell School District consolidated with the Marion School District, thus closing the former Turrell High School. The Turrell High School mascot was the Rockets and its boys basketball teams won two consecutive Class A state basketball championships in 1999 and 2000 and the girls won the state title in 1987.

== Notable person ==
- Jerry Rook (born 1943), two-time All-American basketball player at Arkansas State; born in Turrell

== See also ==
- Old Turrell City Hall
- WGUE (AM)
