= Mississippi Alluvial Plain =

Plain created by the Mississippi River

Coordinates: 34°N 91°W

Mississippi Delta Mississippi River Delta Mississippi embayment Mississippi River-Gulf Outlet Canal

The Mississippi River Alluvial Plain is an alluvial plain created by the Mississippi River on which lie parts of seven U.S. states, from southern Louisiana to southern Illinois (Illinois, Missouri, Kentucky, Tennessee, Arkansas, Mississippi, Louisiana).

The plain is divided into (a) the Mississippi River Delta in the southern half of Louisiana and (b) the upper Mississippi Embayment running from central Louisiana to Illinois.

The term "Mississippi embayment" is sometimes used more narrowly to refer to its section on the western side of the river, running through eastern Arkansas, southeastern Missouri, westernmost Tennessee (east side of the River), westernmost Kentucky (east side of the River) and southernmost Illinois, and excluding northwest Mississippi where the alluvial plain is known as the Mississippi Delta. Most of the alluvium in the lower Mississippi valley is thought to be sourced from the west.

It is the largest ecoregion of Louisiana, covering 12,350 square miles (32,000 km^{2}), and including all of the historic Mississippi River floodplain in the state.

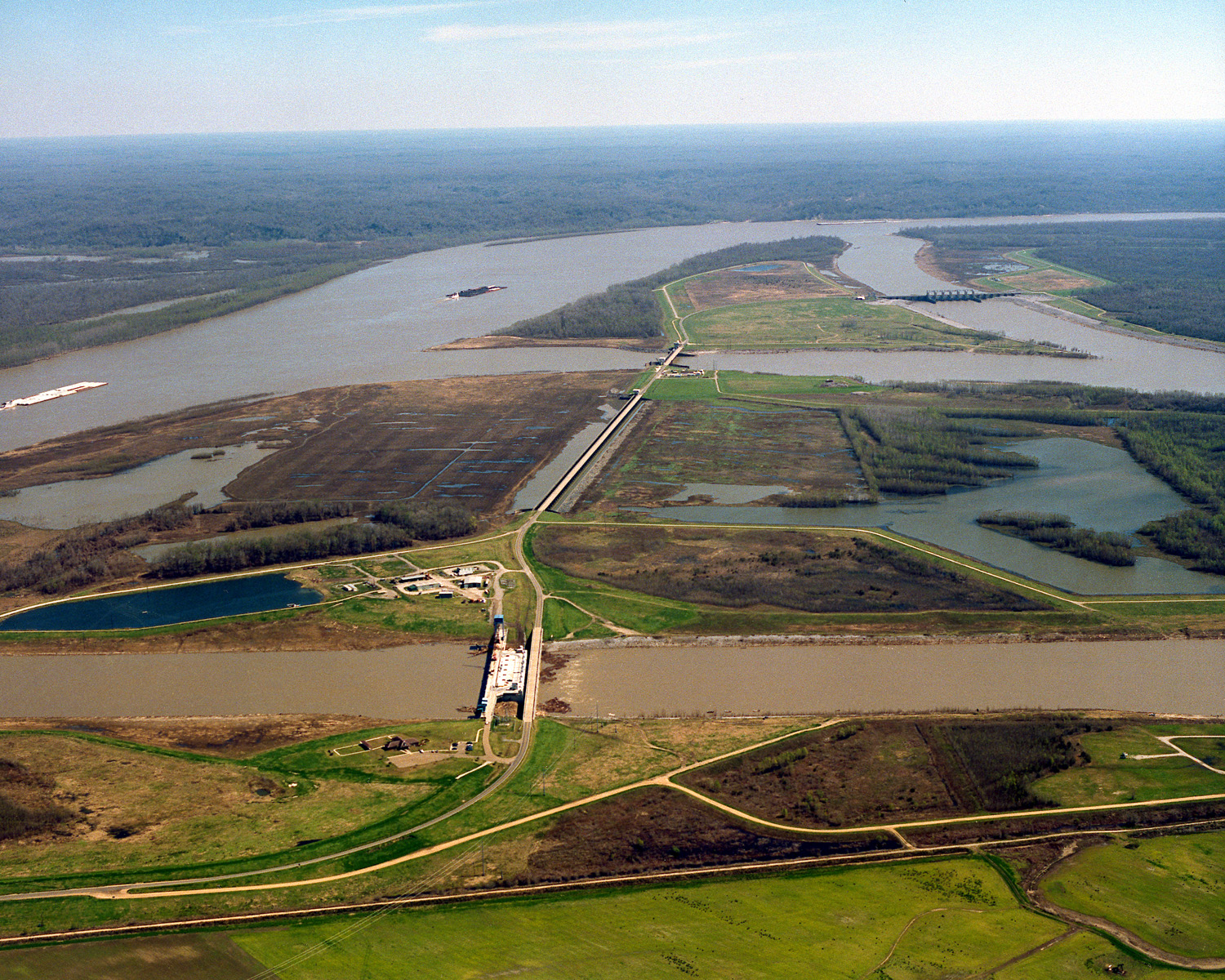
The Mississippi Alluvial Plain at the confluence of the Mississippi and Atchafalaya Rivers
