= Turrell School District =

Defunct school district in Arkansas, United States

Turrell School District or Turrell Public Schools was a school district headquartered in Turrell, Arkansas. It operated Turrell Elementary School and Turrell High School.

The district included Turrell and Gilmore.

The Turrell High School mascot was the Rockets and its boys basketball teams won two consecutive Class A state basketball championships in 1999 and 2000 and the girls won the state title in 1987.

== History ==
In 2010 the district had 250 students; under Arkansas law a school district with under 350 students consistently must merge with another district. Turrell School District on its own tried to merge with another district but the attempt did not finish. The Arkansas Board of Education voted to consolidate the Turrell district with the Marion School District despite objections from the superintendent of the Marion district, Don Johnston; he stated the Marion district was already racially balanced, that Marion already absorbed the Crawfordsville School District in 2004, that the schools in Marion did not have enough room for more students, and that the transportation distance from Turrell to Marion was too far.

On July 1, 2010, the former Turrell School District consolidated with the Marion district and thus closing the former Turrell High School.

== Note ==
- Some content from Turrell, Arkansas
