= Crawfordsville School District =

Defunct school district in Arkansas, United States

Crawfordsville School District was a school district headquartered in Crawfordsville, Arkansas. It had elementary and high school divisions.

On July 1, 2004, the former Crawfordsville School District consolidated with the Marion School District.
