= Hamilton Apartments =

Hamilton Apartments may refer to:

- Hamilton Apartments (West Memphis, Arkansas), listed on the National Register of Historic Places in Crittenden County, Arkansas
- Hamilton Apartments (Lancaster, Pennsylvania), listed on the National Register of Historic Places in Lancaster County, Pennsylvania
- Hamilton Apartments (Fort Worth, Texas), listed on the National Register of Historic Places in Tarrant County, Texas
