= May 2008 tornado outbreak =

May 2008 tornado outbreak may refer to:

- May 1–2, 2008 tornado outbreak, killed seven; affected most of the Central and Southern United States
- Mid-May 2008 tornado outbreak sequence, outbreak sequence that affected the Southern Plains, the southeastern and Middle Atlantic region of the United States from May 7 to May 15, 2008
- Late-May 2008 tornado outbreak sequence, outbreak sequence that affected the Central and Southern Plains of the United States and southern Manitoba from May 22 to May 31, 2008
