= Earle station =

- Missouri Pacific Depot
- U.S. National Register of Historic Places
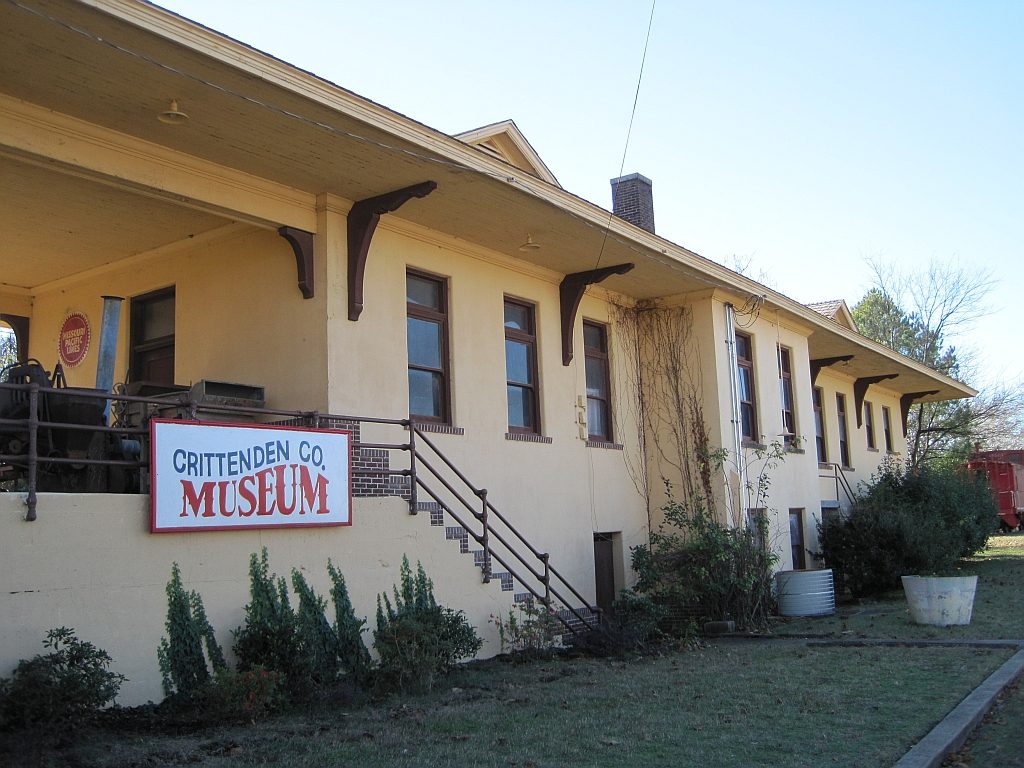

- Location within Arkansas Location within the United States
- Location: Main and Commerce Sts., Earle, Arkansas
- Coordinates: 35°16′10″N 90°27′59″W
- Area: less than one acre
- Built: 1922
- NRHP reference No.: 86000383
- Added to NRHP: March 6, 1986

The Missouri Pacific Depot in Earle, Arkansas, is located south of Main Street and west of Commerce Street, on the north side of the Missouri-Pacific Railroad tracks in the center of town. Completed in 1922, this brick single-story depot exhibits architectural features common to those built by the railroad in that period, with extended eaves supported by large brackets. The station was designed to support passenger and small freight traffic, and served the railroad until 1969.

The depot was listed on the National Register of Historic Places in 1986.

== Crittenden County Museum ==
Since October 1987 the railroad depot houses the Crittenden County Museum. Exhibits of the museum include cotton farming, broom-making, early settlements and history of Crittenden County, schools and doctors. The art exhibit includes works by nationally acclaimed Arkansas Delta artist and Earle native son, Carroll Cloar.

== See also ==
- National Register of Historic Places listings in Crittenden County, Arkansas

| Preceding station | Missouri Pacific Railroad | Following station |
|---|---|---|
| Parkin toward St. Louis | St. Louis – Memphis | Crawfordsville toward Memphis |
| Parkin toward Bald Knob | Bald Knob – Memphis | Crawfordsville toward Memphis |
