= Riverside Speedway =

"Riverside Speedway" may refer to:

- Riverside International Speedway, 1/3 mile, high banked, asphalt short track located in James River, Nova Scotia, Canada
- Riverside International Raceway, defunct road course in Riverside, California
- Riverside International Speedway (West Memphis, Arkansas), a 1/4 mile dirt oval outside Memphis, Tennessee
- Groveton Riverside Speedway, 1/4 mile, high banked, asphalt short track located in Groveton, New Hampshire
- Circuit Riverside Speedway Ste-Croix, 5/8 mile oval and 1.7 km road course in Sainte-Croix, Quebec, Canada

== See also ==
- Riverhead Raceway, 1/4 mile, flat, asphalt short track located in Riverhead, New York
