= Riverside International Speedway (Arkansas) =

The Ditch
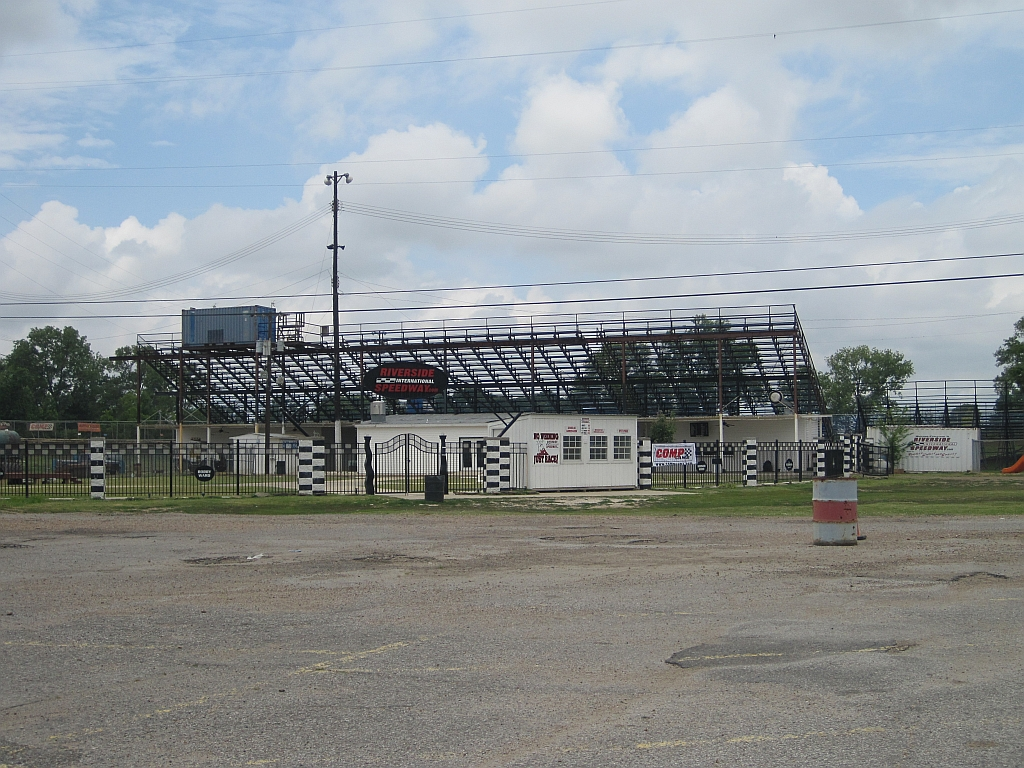
- Grandstands in 2012
- Location: 151 Legion Rd., West Memphis, Arkansas
- Coordinates: 35.14371°N 90.13524°W
- Opened: 1950
- Major events: World of Outlaws sprint cars USCS sprint cars

1/4 mile
- Surface: Gumbo Clay
- Length: 0.25 mi (0.40 km)

- Riverside Speedway
- U.S. National Register of Historic Places
- Location within Arkansas Location within the United States
- Location: 151 Legion Rd., West Memphis, Arkansas
- Area: 18.3 acres (7.4 ha)
- Built: June 10, 1950
- Built by: C.L. Montgomery, et al.
- Architectural style: Plain Traditional
- NRHP reference No.: 09001243
- Added to NRHP: January 21, 2010

The Riverside International Speedway is an automobile racing facility at 151 Legion Road in West Memphis, Arkansas. Its facilities consist of a 0.25-mile (0.40 km) Gumbo clay oval with banked corners, bleacher seating on both straightaways. Amenities include a concession stand. The track was built in 1950 and opened June 10 of that year at an estimated cost of $150,000 by C L Montgomery, originally to showcase midget car racing. It has held a World of Outlaws race. The track is nicknamed "The Ditch".

== History ==
The track was built in 1950 as a venue for midget car racing which was popular at the time. Four area tracks were scheduled for weekly racing from Thursday to Sunday nights and Riverside was designed as the Saturday night option. The first night on June 10 had 45 midget cars entered but it rained out being rescheduled for June 17. On Thursday June 15, 1950 the first race was actually held as a stock car event. The stock cars were gaining popularity in the Mid-South and the midget cars were quickly discontinued. Joie Chitwood brought his "Thrill Show" to the track on October 1, 1950.

== Notable drivers ==
Several World of Outlaws regular drivers who began racing at the track include Sammy Swindell, Bobby Davis Jr., and Jason Sides.

== Historical place ==
Riverside is the oldest surviving dirt track in the Memphis area, and is listed on the National Register of Historic Places. Riverside is the oldest continuously operating track in Arkansas. It is noted for its high concentration of clay in the gumbo soil (almost 37% clay compared to more typically 22%-27%). Contributing properties include the race track, flagstand, original 1950 ticket booth (now an office), concession stand, cotton candy concession stand, and concession stand / bathroom. The facility also contains the west grandstands that were brought to the facility from Memphis-Arkansas Speedway in 2007-2008 and reconstructed. Its eastern grandstands have aluminum seating. The current wood ticket booth was built in 2008.

== See also ==
- National Register of Historic Places listings in Crittenden County, Arkansas
