= George Berry Washington Memorial =

- U.S. National Register of Historic Places
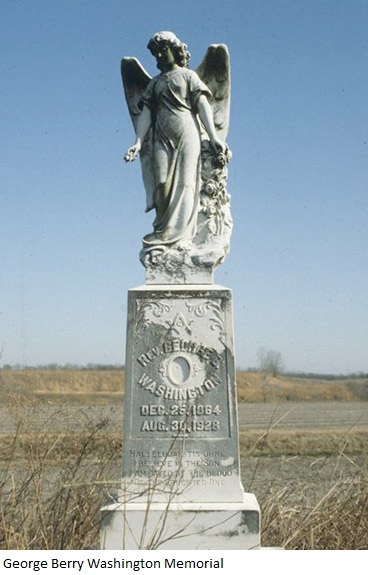

- Location within Arkansas Location within the United States
- Nearest city: Earle, Arkansas
- Coordinates: 35°17′50″N 90°28′1″W
- Area: less than one acre
- Built: 1928
- Architectural style: Classical Revival
- MPS: Ethnic and Racial Minority Settlement of the Arkansas Delta MPS
- NRHP reference No.: 94000824
- Added to NRHP: August 11, 1994

The George Berry Washington Memorial is a monumental funerary sculpture located on Arkansas Highway 149 north of Earle, Arkansas. It is the only major funerary sculpture in Crittenden County, and it commemorates the life and accomplishments of the Rev. George Berry Washington (1864-1928), an African American who was probably born into slavery, but ended his life as one of the county's largest landowners. Washington's grave site is on a low mound in an open field on the east side Highway 149. Two elaborately carved stone piers, 3 feet (0.91 m) in height, flank wide steps leading up to the monument. The monument is a marble statue of an angel 5 feet (1.5 m) in height, mounted on a column of marble blocks 6 feet (1.8 m) high.

The memorial was listed on the National Register of Historic Places in 1994.

== See also ==
- National Register of Historic Places listings in Crittenden County, Arkansas
