= Wilson Power and Light Company Ice Plant =

- U.S. National Register of Historic Places
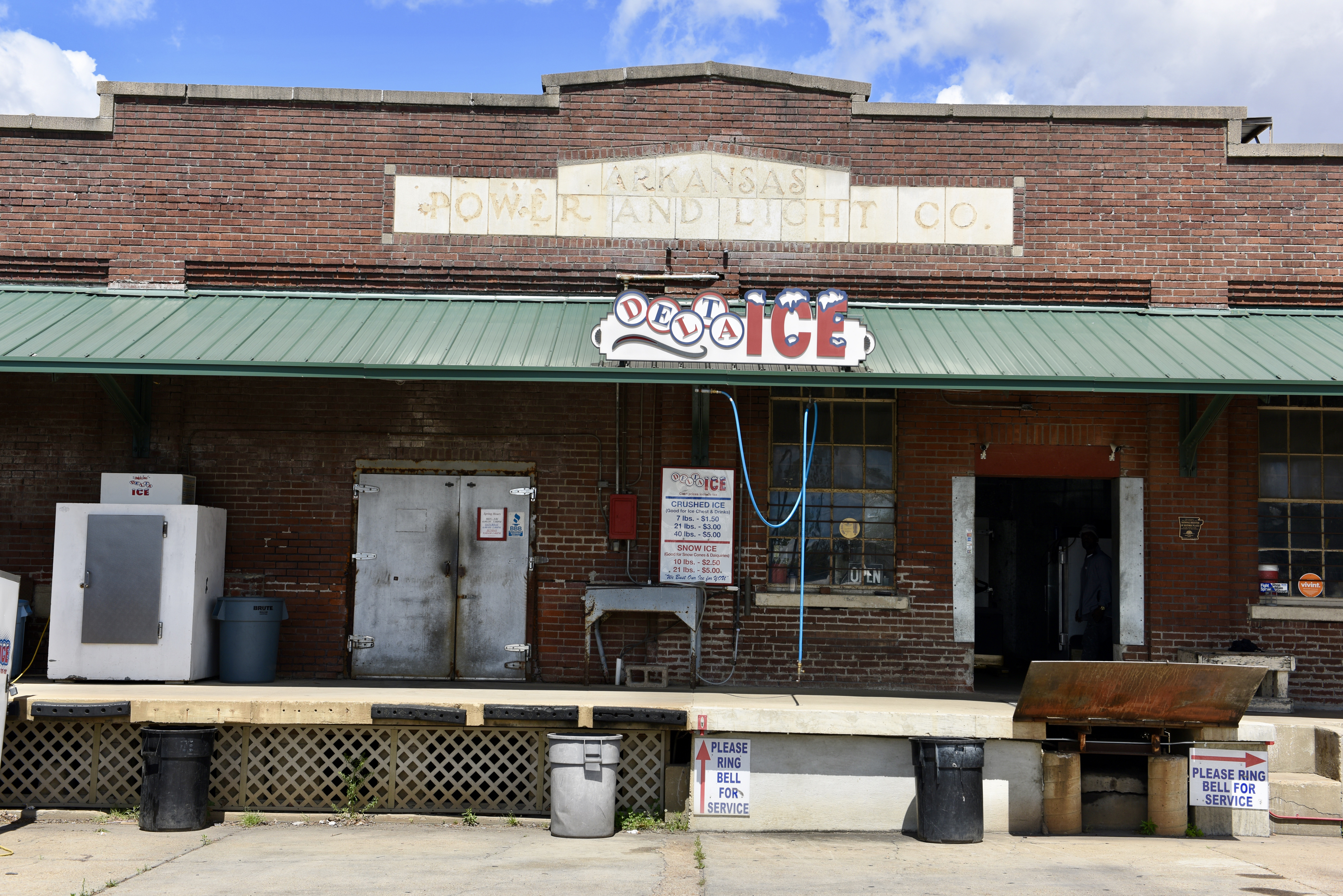

- Location within Arkansas Location within the United States
- Location: 120 East Broadway; West Memphis, Arkansas
- Coordinates: 35°8′48″N 90°11′0.5″W
- Area: less than one acre
- Built: 1930
- Architectural style: Early Commercial
- NRHP reference No.: 09001244
- Added to NRHP: January 21, 2010

The Wilson Power and Light Company Ice Plant, later known as Delta Ice, is a historic industrial facility at 120 East Broadway in West Memphis, Arkansas. Built in 1930, it is a regionally distinctive brick structure, used for the manufacture and distribution of ice, a critical product that facilitated the shipment of perishable goods prior to the advent of refrigerated trucks. Its front facade is dominated by a loading dock, sheltered by a corrugated metal awning. The main decorative feature of the building is its parapet, formed of brick and cast stone. The interior retains original features, such as large 40-gallon vats which were used to produce 300-pound blocks of ice.

The building was listed on the National Register of Historic Places in 2010, at which time it was still in use as an icemaking facility.

== See also ==
- National Register of Historic Places listings in Crittenden County, Arkansas
