= Lawrie House =

Historic house in Arkansas, United States

- U.S. National Register of Historic Places
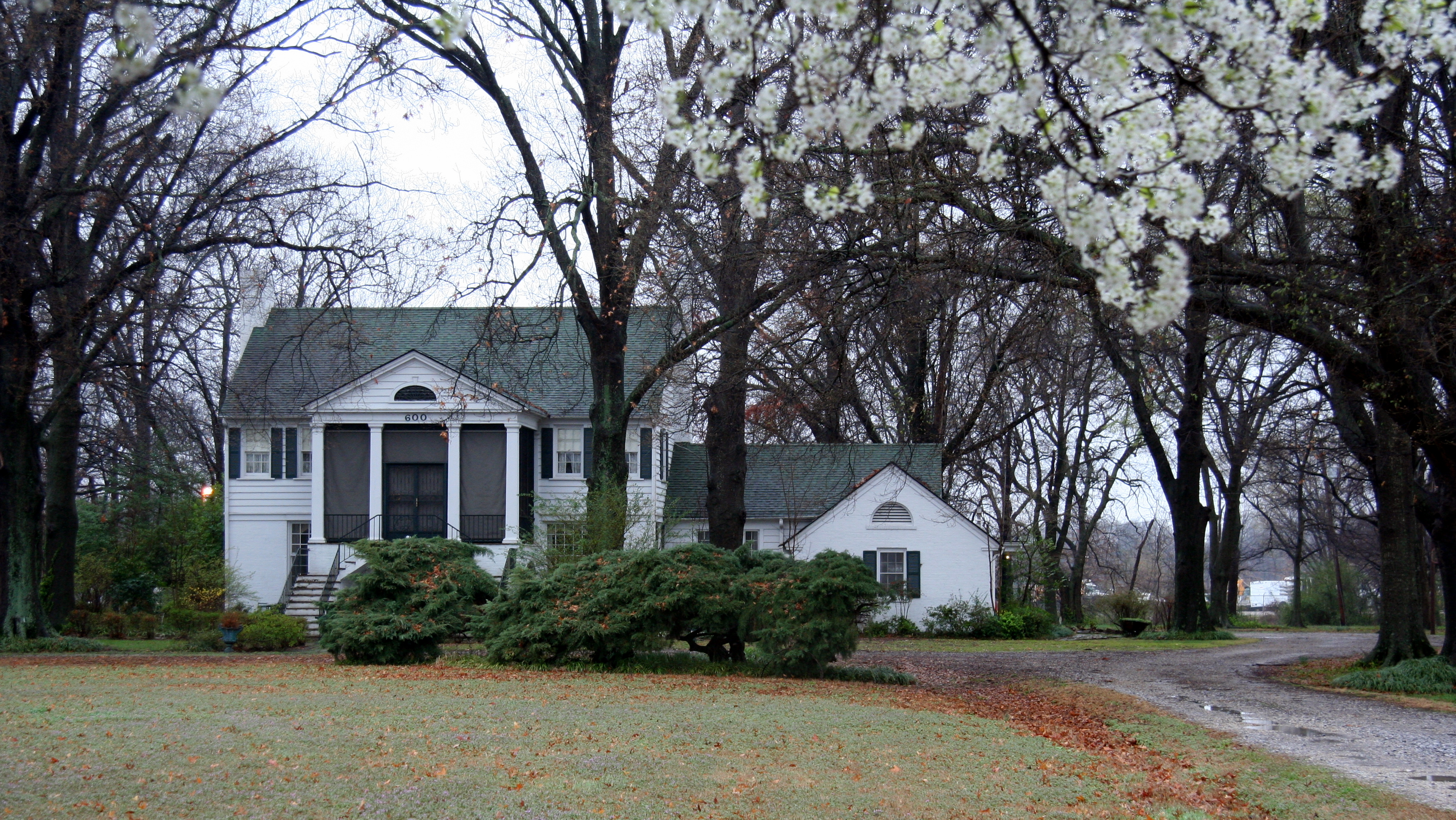

- Location within Arkansas Location within the United States
- Location: 600 N. 7th St., West Memphis, Arkansas
- Coordinates: 35.15294°N 90.17693°W
- Area: 11 acres (4.5 ha)
- Built: 1939
- Built by: Mite (only name known), Monroe Manchester
- Architectural style: Colonial Revival
- NRHP reference No.: 96000330
- Added to NRHP: March 28, 1996

The Lawrie House is a historic house at 600 North 7th Street in West Memphis, Arkansas. It is a 2 1/2-story wood-frame structure, with a side-gable roof and numerous projecting gables. The first floor is faced in brick veneer, giving the appearance of a raised basement. The main facade is dominated by its porch, which has a projecting gable roof supported by four square columns. Its main entry is flanked by sidelight windows and topped by a four-light lunette window and gable. The interior features elegant Colonial Revival woodwork. The house was built in 1939 by J. O. E. Beck, a plantation owner, as a wedding present for his daughter Elizabeth, who married Donald Lawrie.

The house was listed on the National Register of Historic Places in 1996.

== See also ==
- National Register of Historic Places listings in Crittenden County, Arkansas
