= Dabbs Store =

- U.S. National Register of Historic Places
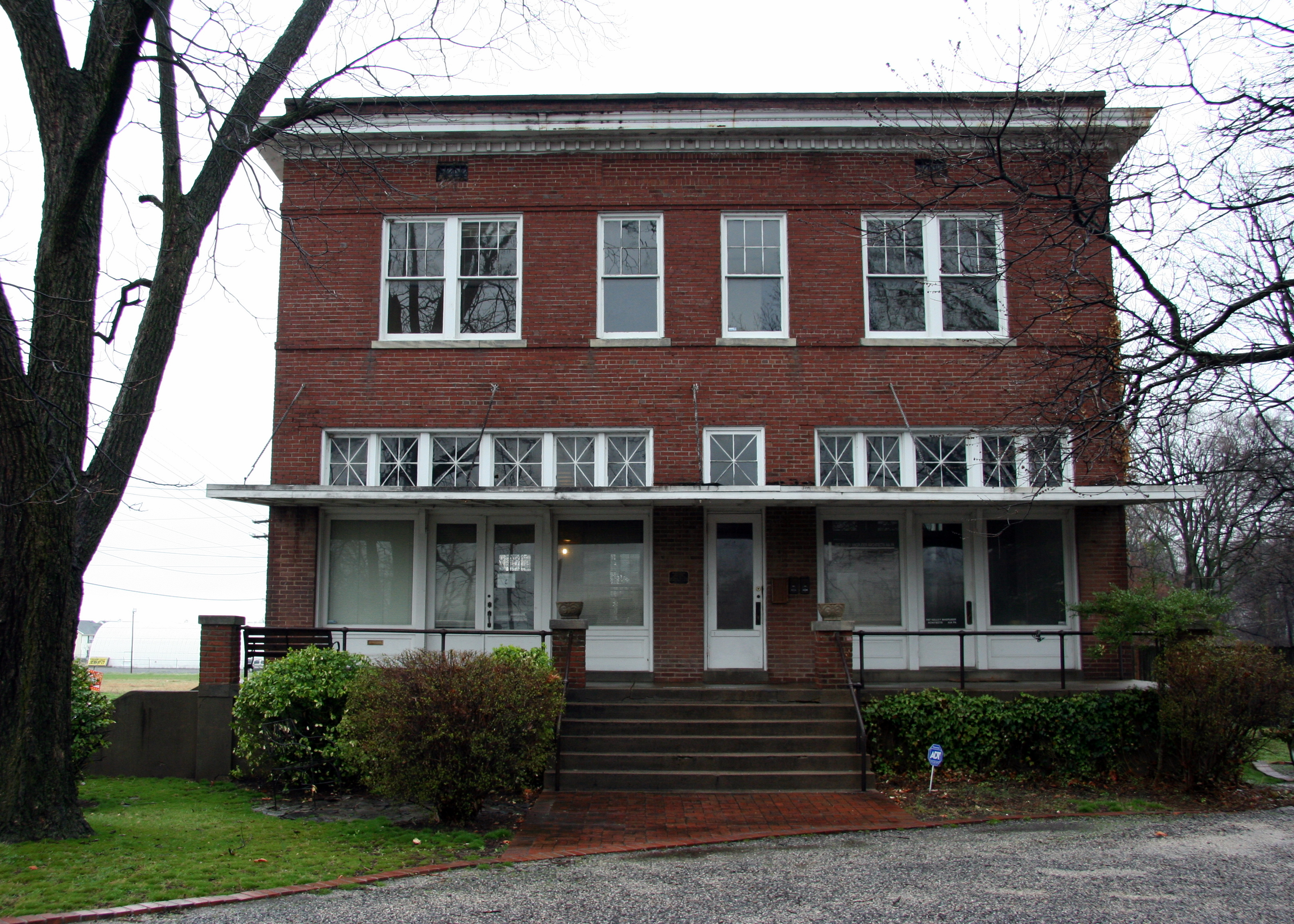

- Location within Arkansas Location within the United States
- Location: 1320 S. Avalon, West Memphis, Arkansas
- Coordinates: 35°7′47″N 90°11′36″W
- Area: less than one acre
- Built: 1912
- NRHP reference No.: 82002112
- Added to NRHP: May 17, 1982

The Dabbs Store is a historic retail building at 1320 South Avalon Street in West Memphis, Arkansas, United States. It is a brick two-story structure, located near the railroad tracks and the site of a now-demolished train depot in an isolated area of West Memphis. The building has two storefronts and a central entrance leading to the upper floor, which houses residential spaces. The storefronts are similarly styled but differ in size, that on the left is wider due to larger windows flanking its entrance. The windows of the storefronts are mounted on decorative wooden panels, and there are a series of large transom windows above the porch roof, matching the width of each storefront. Built in 1912, it is one of the oldest surviving commercial structures in the city.

The building was listed on the National Register of Historic Places in 1982.

== See also ==
- National Register of Historic Places listings in Crittenden County, Arkansas
