= Earle High School =

Location
- 1401 Third Street; Earle, Arkansas 72364; United States; 35°16′19″N 90°28′11″W

Information
- Type: Comprehensive
- Established: 1909 (117 years ago)
- School district: Earle School District
- CEEB code: 040675
- NCES School ID: 050555000266
- Teaching staff: 30.61 (on FTE basis)
- Grades: 7–12
- Enrollment: 186 (2023-2024)
- Student to teacher ratio: 6.08
- Colors: Cardinal and white
- Nickname: Bulldogs
- Website: www.earle.crsc.k12.ar.us
- Old Earle High School
- U.S. National Register of Historic Places
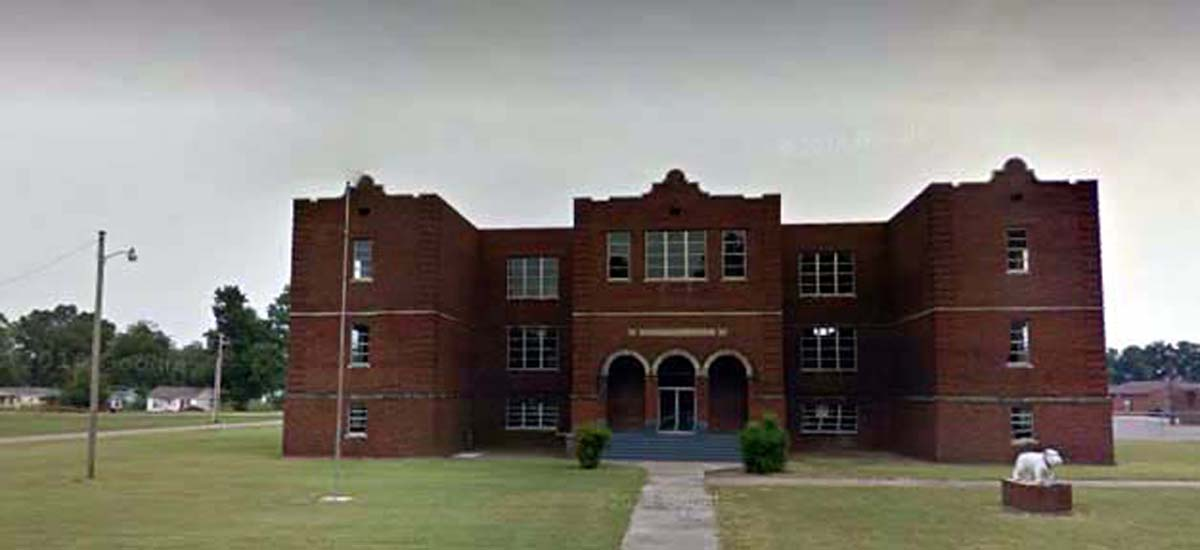

- Location within Arkansas Location within the United States
- Location: Ruth St. and High 2nd St., Earle, Arkansas
- Coordinates: 35°16′16″N 90°28′17″W
- Area: less than one acre
- Built: 1919
- Architectural style: Late 19th and 20th Century Revival: Mission/Spanish Revival style
- NRHP reference No.: 03000956
- Added to NRHP: September 27, 2003

Earle High School, located in Earle, Arkansas, United States is an accredited public high school and the sole institution of the Earle School District. It is one of the four public high schools in Crittenden County. On May 2, 2008, the school suffered damage from a series of destructive tornadoes that affected the region.

== Academics ==
The curriculum at Earle High School follows the Smart Core program established by the Arkansas Department of Education (ADE). Students complete a comprehensive course of study, including regular classes and exams and have the opportunity to take Advanced Placement (AP) courses and exams in subjects like English, Mathematics, Science and Social Studies that may grant college credit. Additionally, students can enroll concurrently at Mid-South Community College in West Memphis, earning transferable college credits accepted by all state colleges and universities in Arkansas. To graduate, students must complete a minimum of 24 credits.

Established prior to 1909, Earle High School is accredited by the ADE and has been accredited by AdvancED (formerly North Central Association) since 1925.

== Athletics ==
The mascot for Earle High School is the Bulldog and the school colors are cardinal and white.

The Earle Bulldogs competed in the 3A Classification of the 3A Region 3 Conference, which is administered by the Arkansas Activities Association, from 2012 to 2014. The Bulldogs have teams for football, basketball (boys/girls), tennis (boys/girls), track (boys/girls).

== History ==
=== Old Earle High School ===
Old Earle High School served as the city's high school between 1919 and 1978.

== Notable alumni ==
- Gerry Bohanon, college football player for the South Florida Bulls, formerly for the Baylor Bears
- Jaylen Smith, college student and mayor
