= National Register of Historic Places listings in Crittenden County, Arkansas =

Location of Crittenden County in Arkansas

This is a list of the National Register of Historic Places listings in Crittenden County, Arkansas.

This is intended to be a complete list of the properties and districts on the National Register of Historic Places in Crittenden County, Arkansas, United States. The locations of National Register properties and districts for which the latitude and longitude coordinates are included below, may be seen in a map.

There are 18 properties and districts listed on the National Register in the county.

Contents: Counties in Arkansas
- Arkansas
- Ashley
- Baxter
- Benton
- Boone
- Bradley
- Calhoun
- Carroll
- Chicot
- Clark
- Clay
- Cleburne
- Cleveland
- Columbia
- Conway
- Craighead
- Crawford
- Crittenden
- Cross
- Dallas
- Desha
- Drew
- Faulkner
- Franklin
- Fulton
- Garland
- Grant
- Greene
- Hempstead
- Hot Spring
- Howard
- Independence
- Izard
- Jackson
- Jefferson
- Johnson
- Lafayette
- Lawrence
- Lee
- Lincoln
- Little River
- Logan
- Lonoke
- Madison
- Marion
- Miller
- Mississippi
- Monroe
- Montgomery
- Nevada
- Newton
- Ouachita
- Perry
- Phillips
- Pike
- Poinsett
- Polk
- Pope
- Prairie
- Pulaski (Little Rock)
- Randolph
- St. Francis
- Saline
- Scott
- Searcy
- Sebastian
- Sevier
- Sharp
- Stone
- Union
- Van Buren
- Washington
- White
- Woodruff
- Yell

This National Park Service list is complete through NPS recent listings posted October 2, 2026.

== Current listings ==
	Name on the Register	Image	Date listed	Location	City or town	Description
1	Charles and Eula Brown House		October 6, 2026 (#100013483)	218 Roosevelt Avenue; 35°09′10″N 90°11′21″W	West Memphis	
2	Crittenden County Bank and Trust Company	Crittenden County Bank and Trust Company	April 19, 1984 (#84000662)	Military Road; 35°12′51″N 90°11′44″W	Marion	
3	Crittenden County Courthouse	Crittenden County Courthouse	August 3, 1977 (#77000251)	85 Jackson Street; 35°12′57″N 90°11′45″W	Marion	
4	Dabbs Store	Dabbs Store	May 17, 1982 (#82002112)	1320 South Avalon; 35°07′47″N 90°11′36″W	West Memphis	
5	Hamilton Apartments	Hamilton Apartments	June 3, 1998 (#98000618)	113 West Danner Street; 35°09′00″N 90°11′08″W	West Memphis	
6	Highway A-7, Gilmore to Turrell	Highway A-7, Gilmore to Turrell	May 12, 2009 (#09000313)	Old U.S. Highway 63 between Acwin Street in Gilmore and ditch No. 2 in Turrell; 35°24′35″N 90°16′43″W	Gilmore	
7	Johnson-Portis House	Johnson-Portis House	September 21, 2017 (#100001648)	400 N. Avalon St. 35°09′02″N 90°11′37″W	West Memphis	
8	Lawrie House	Lawrie House	March 28, 1996 (#96000330)	600 North 7th Street; 35°09′11″N 90°10′36″W	West Memphis	
9	Marion Colored High School	Marion Colored High School	March 23, 1995 (#95000349)	West of Highway 77; 35°13′17″N 90°12′05″W	Sunset	
10	Memphis and Arkansas Bridge	Memphis and Arkansas Bridge	February 16, 2001 (#01000139)	Interstate 55; 35°07′47″N 90°04′45″W	West Memphis	Extends into Shelby County, Tennessee
11	Missouri Pacific Depot	Missouri Pacific Depot	March 6, 1986 (#86000383)	Main and Commerce Streets; 35°16′10″N 90°27′59″W	Earle	Currently the Crittenden County Museum
12	Old Earle High School	Old Earle High School	September 27, 2003 (#03000956)	Junction of Ruth Street and High Second Street (U.S. Highway 64B); 35°16′15″N 90°28′17″W	Earle	
13	Old Turrell City Hall	Old Turrell City Hall	September 19, 2007 (#07000962)	160 Eureka Street; 35°22′42″N 90°15′21″W	Turrell	
14	Riverside Speedway	Riverside Speedway	January 21, 2010 (#09001243)	151 Legion Road; 35°08′44″N 90°08′02″W	West Memphis	
15	George Berry Washington Memorial	George Berry Washington Memorial	August 11, 1994 (#94000824)	Highway 149, north of Earle; 35°17′50″N 90°28′01″W	Earle	
16	West Memphis City Hall	West Memphis City Hall	July 8, 2010 (#10000444)	100 Court Street; 35°08′43″N 90°11′09″W	West Memphis	
17	West Memphis Commercial Historic District	West Memphis Commercial Historic District	July 24, 2008 (#08000704)	700, 800, and 900 blocks of East Broadway; 35°08′48″N 90°10′26″W	West Memphis	
18	Wilson Power and Light Company Ice Plant	Wilson Power and Light Company Ice Plant	January 21, 2010 (#09001244)	120 East Broadway; 35°08′48″N 90°11′05″W	West Memphis	

== See also ==
- List of National Historic Landmarks in Arkansas
- National Register of Historic Places listings in Arkansas
