= West Memphis Commercial Historic District =

Historic district in Arkansas, United States

- U.S. National Register of Historic Places
- U.S. Historic district
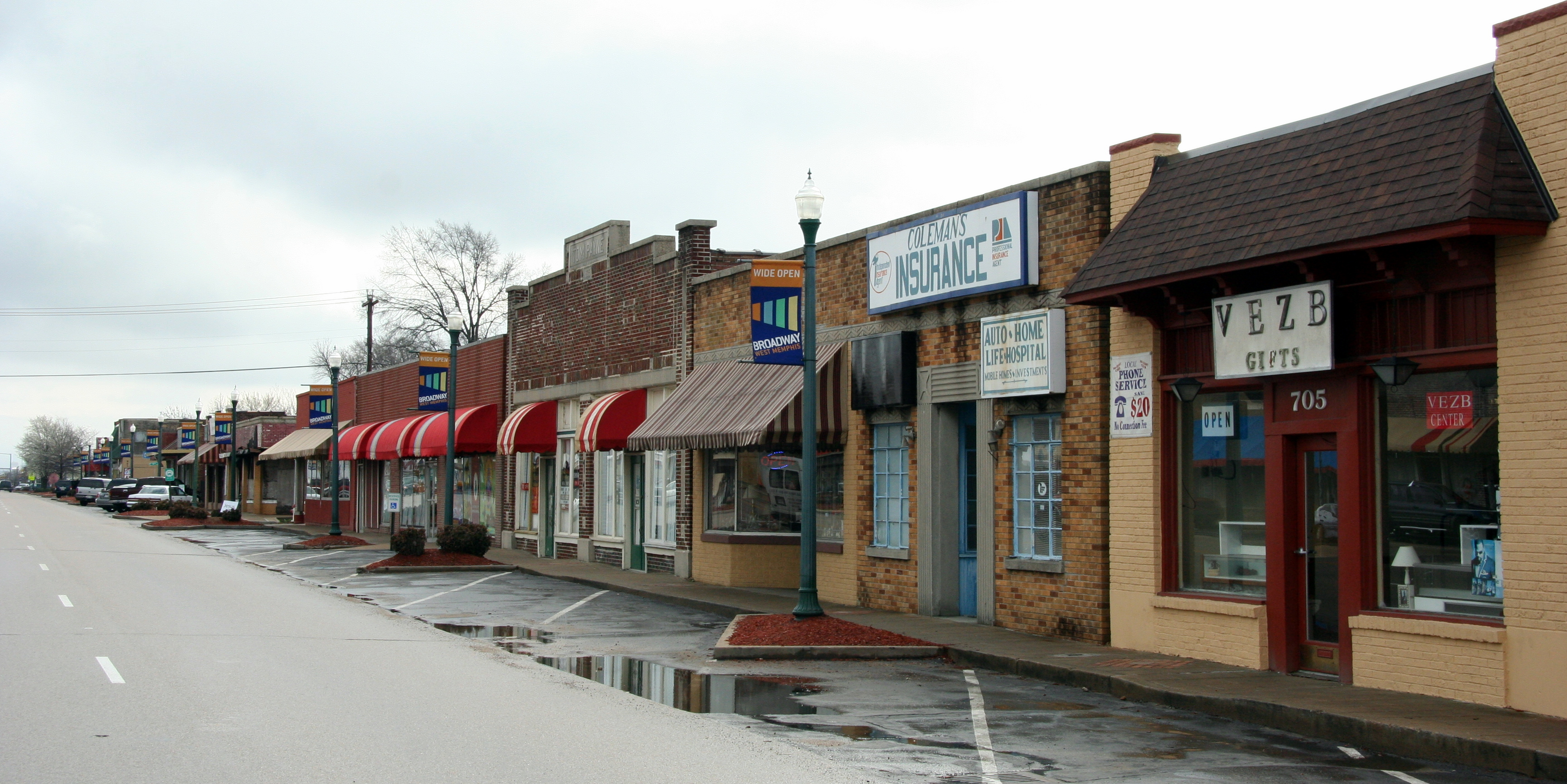

- Location within Arkansas Location within the United States
- Location: 700, 800, and 900 blocks of E. Broadway Ave., West Memphis, Arkansas
- Coordinates: 35.14648°N 90.17403°W
- Area: 11.5 acres (4.7 ha)
- Built: 1930
- Architectural style: Early Commercial, Art Deco
- NRHP reference No.: 08000704
- Added to NRHP: July 24, 2008

The West Memphis Commercial Historic District encompasses the largest concentration of historic commercial buildings in the central business district of West Memphis, Arkansas. The district extends along East Broadway (United States Route 70) between 7th and 10th Streets, and includes 22 historic buildings. Most of these buildings were built between 1930 and 1950, and are typically single-story brick buildings with vernacular commercial design. A number of the buildings have modest Art Deco features, such as the cornice at 801 East Broadway.

The district was listed on the National Register of Historic Places in 2008.

== See also ==
- National Register of Historic Places listings in Crittenden County, Arkansas
