= Highway A-7, Gilmore to Turrell =

- U.S. National Register of Historic Places
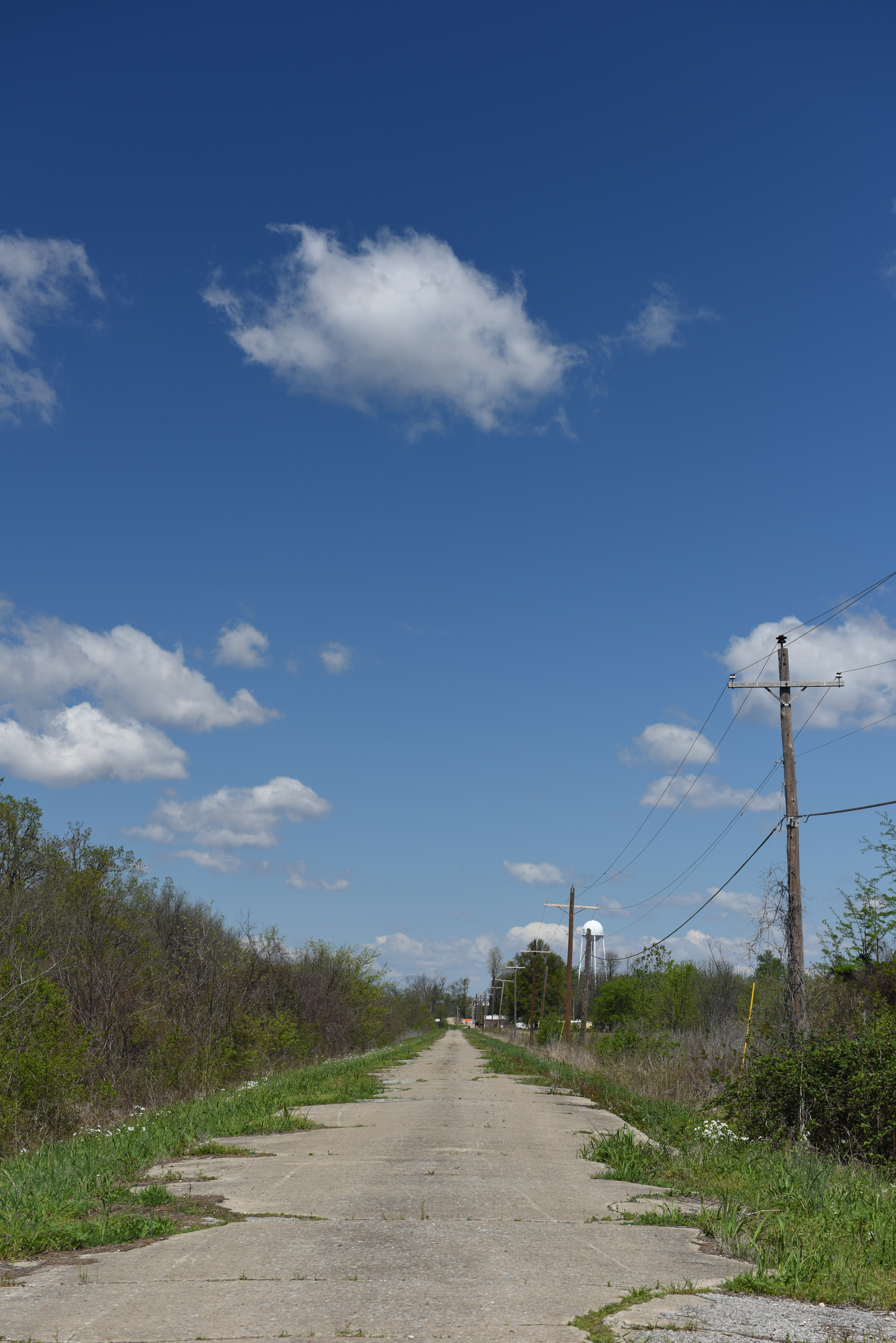

- Location within Arkansas Location within the United States
- Nearest city: Gilmore, Arkansas
- Area: 5.3 acres (2.1 ha)
- Built: 1922
- MPS: Arkansas Highway History and Architecture MPS
- NRHP reference No.: 09000313
- Added to NRHP: May 12, 2009

Highway A-7, Gilmore to Turrell is an old alignment of U.S. Route 63 (US 63) in Crittenden County, Arkansas. Built c. 1922, it travels parallel to the tracks of the Burlington Northern Santa Fe Railroad between Gilmore and Turrell, a distance of about 2.2 miles (3.5 km). Uniquely for practices of the time, this section of concrete roadway consists of a continuous pour, instead of the more typical practice of pouring the roadway in sections. The roadway is 17 feet (5.2 m) wide, with no shoulders, and carries two lanes of traffic. The road section includes a c. 1922 bridge, also made with reinforced concrete. US 63 was realigned off this segment in 1952, which is now known as Front Street in Gilmore and Eureka Street in Turrell.

The roadway segment was listed on the National Register of Historic Places in 2009.

== See also ==
- National Register of Historic Places listings in Crittenden County, Arkansas
