= Crittenden County Bank and Trust Company =

- U.S. National Register of Historic Places
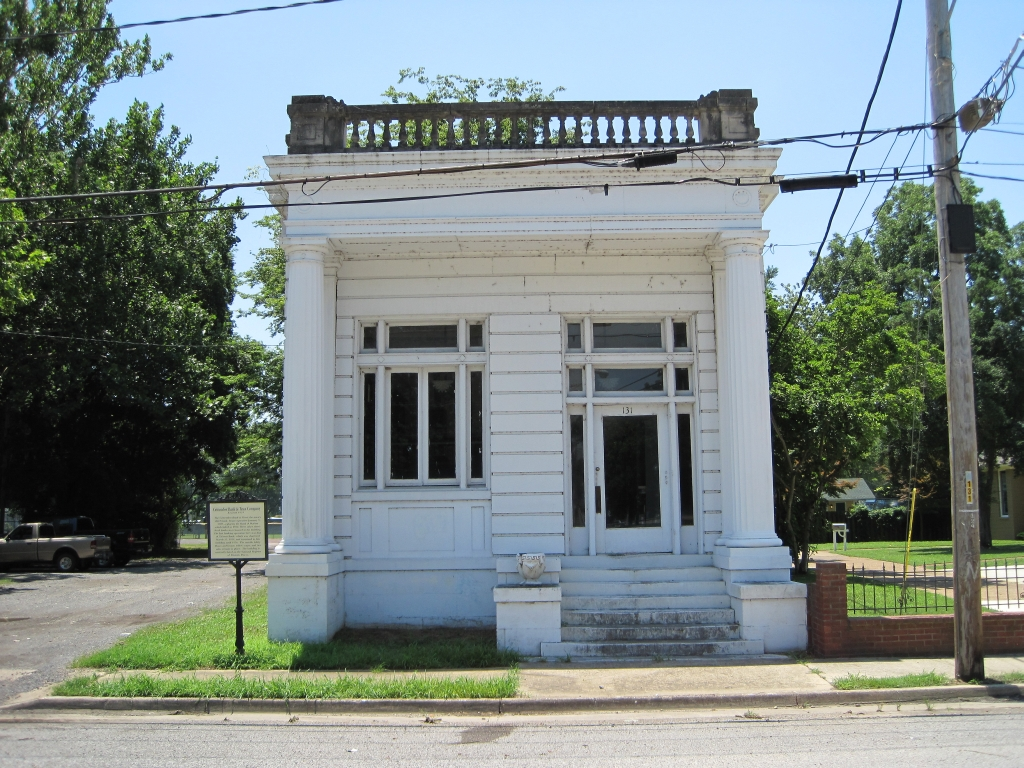

- Location within Arkansas Location within the United States
- Location: Military Rd., Marion, Arkansas
- Coordinates: 35°12′51″N 90°11′44″W
- Area: less than one acre
- Built: 1919
- Architectural style: Classical Revival
- NRHP reference No.: 84000662
- Added to NRHP: April 19, 1984

The Crittenden County Bank and Trust Company is a historic bank building on the south side of Military Road in the center of Marion, Arkansas. It is a single-story building, faced in painted limestone on the front facade and brick on the sides, with fluted Doric columns carrying a portico that spans the building's width. Built in 1919, it has been home to a number of local banking institutions, and is a prominent local landmark, noted for its fine Classical Revival styling and its elegantly-appointed interior.

The building was listed on the National Register of Historic Places in 1984.

== See also ==
- National Register of Historic Places listings in Crittenden County, Arkansas
