= West Memphis City Hall =

- U.S. National Register of Historic Places
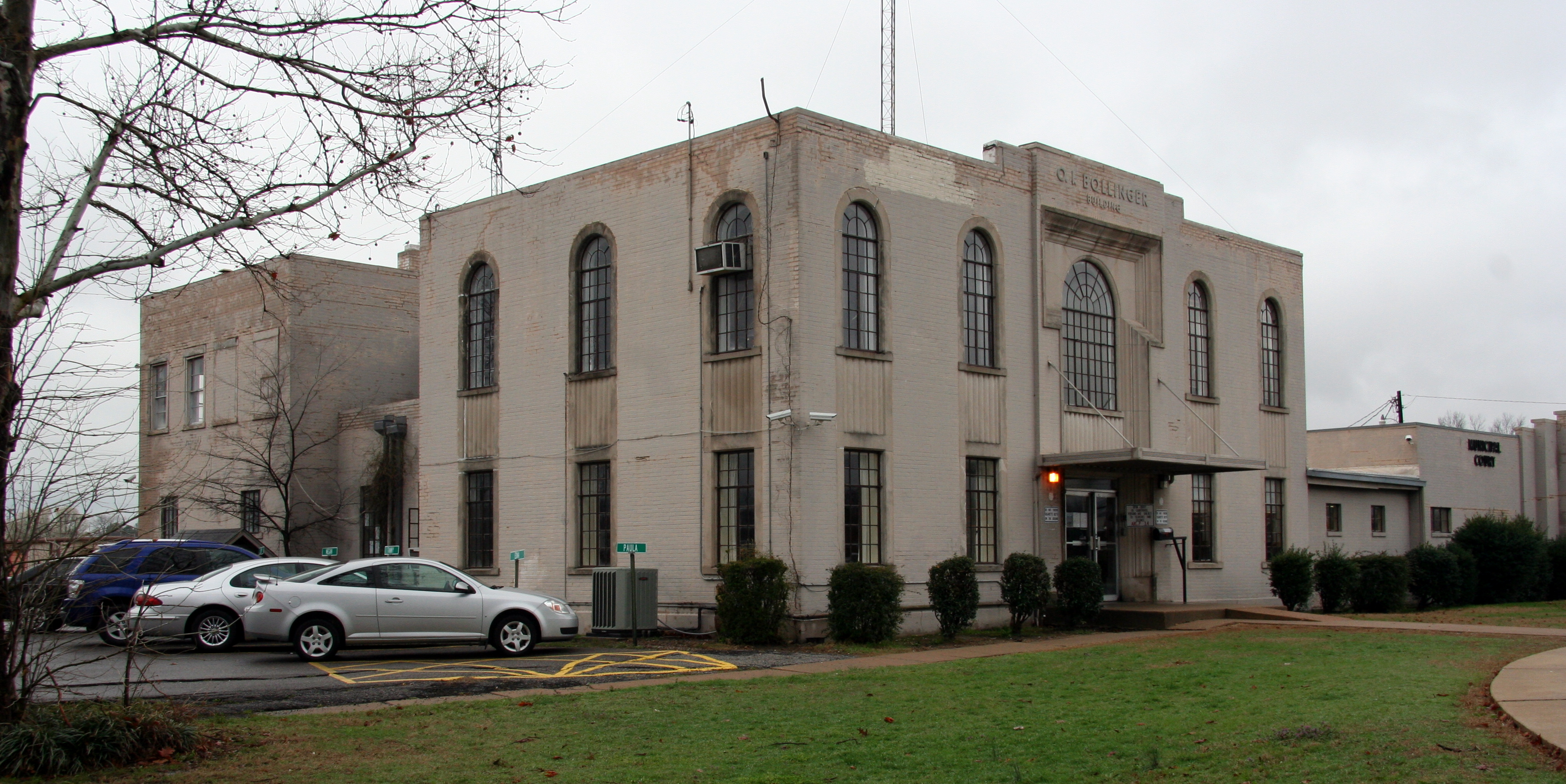

- Location within Arkansas Location within the United States
- Location: 100 Court St., West Memphis, Arkansas
- Coordinates: 35°8′43″N 90°11′9″W
- Area: 2 acres (0.81 ha)
- Built: 1938
- Architectural style: Classical Revival; Art Deco
- NRHP reference No.: 10000444
- Added to NRHP: July 8, 2010

The former West Memphis City Hall is a historic municipal building at 100 Court Street in West Memphis, Arkansas, United States. It is a brick building, whose original 1938 construction consisted of two two-story sections joined by a single-story connector. The front portion of the building housed city offices, while the rear portion housed the fire station and the jail. It was built in 1938 with funding from the Public Works Administration, a Depression-era jobs program. The building was extended to include a courtroom annex in 1944–45, and an enlarged jail annex was added in 1960–61. It no longer houses town offices (which are at 205 South Redding Street); it now houses a police dispatch center and the municipal court.

The building was listed on the National Register of Historic Places in 2010.

== See also ==
- National Register of Historic Places listings in Crittenden County, Arkansas
