= Jaylen Smith (politician) =

American politician (born 2003 or 2004)

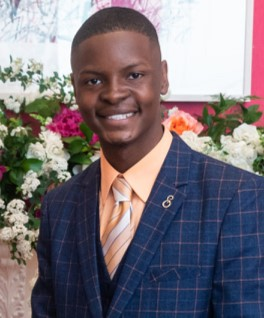
- Smith in 2023

Mayor of Earle, Arkansas
- Incumbent
- Assumed office January 3, 2023
- Preceded by: Carolyn Jones

Personal details
- Born: Jaylen Smith; 2003 or 2004 (age 21–22) Earle, Arkansas, U.S.
- Party: Democratic
- Education: Earle High School

Jaylen Smith (born 2003 or 2004) is an American politician who has served as the mayor of Earle, Arkansas since January 2023, after winning the mayoral election on December 6, 2022.

At age 18, he became one of the youngest mayors ever elected in the United States.

== Early life and education ==
Smith graduated from Earle High School in May 2022.

== Career ==
In 2022, running as a Democratic Party candidate, Smith won the election to be the mayor of Earle, Arkansas. He won 235 votes, beating his rival candidate Nemi Matthews, who received 185 votes. He was sworn into office on January 3, 2023. His victory made him the youngest black mayor in US history. This also made him one of the youngest mayors of any race in the United States.

Smith's mayoral priorities include improving public safety and transportation, beautification and renewal of underused housing, emergency preparedness, and addressing the food desert in Earle. In preparation for his time in public office, Smith was given guidance by Frank Scott Jr., the mayor of Little Rock, Arkansas.

Smith joined President Clinton on stage and was a featured speaker at the 2023 Clinton Global Initiative University Meeting at Vanderbilt University.

In April 2023, Smith met with Vice President Kamala Harris. he has met her two other times, and spoke with President Biden.

== Awards and honors ==
Smith received the President's Award of the Arkansas Democratic Black Caucus at the organization's 2023 King Kennedy Awards.

== Electoral history ==
2022 Earle mayoral election
Candidate	Votes	%
Jaylen Smith	235	55.95
Nemi Matthews	185	44.05
Total votes	420	100.00

== See also ==
- Michael Sessions
- John Tyler Hammons
- List of first African-American mayors
