= Earle School District =

Public school district in Arkansas, US

Location
- 1401 Third Street; Earle, Arkansas 71665 United States

District information
- Motto: Educational Excellence for Everyone
- Grades: PK–12
- Established: 1919
- Accreditation: Arkansas Department of Education
- Schools: 2
- NCES District ID: 0505550

Students and staff
- Students: 727
- Teachers: 63.18 (on FTE basis)
- Staff: 144.18 (on FTE basis)
- Student–teacher ratio: 11.51
- District mascot: Bulldog
- Colors: Cardinal; White

Other information
- Website: www.earle.crsc.k12.ar.us

Earle School District is a public school district based in Earle, Arkansas, United States.

The school district encompasses 135.16 square miles (350.1 km^{2}) of land, The district includes portions of Crittenden County, serving Earle and most of Jennette. It also includes portions of Cross County.

Founded in 1919, the district proves comprehensive education for more than 700 pre-kindergarten through grade 12 students while employing more than 140 teachers and staff. The district and its schools are accredited by the Arkansas Department of Education (ADE).

In 2017 the district had 560 students. In November 2017 the district was placed under the control of the Arkansas Department of Education.

== Schools ==
- Earle High School, located in Earle and serving more than 325 students in grades 7 through 12.
- Earle Elementary School, located in Earle and serving more than 375 students in pre-kindergarten through grade 6.
