= Gumbo (soil) =

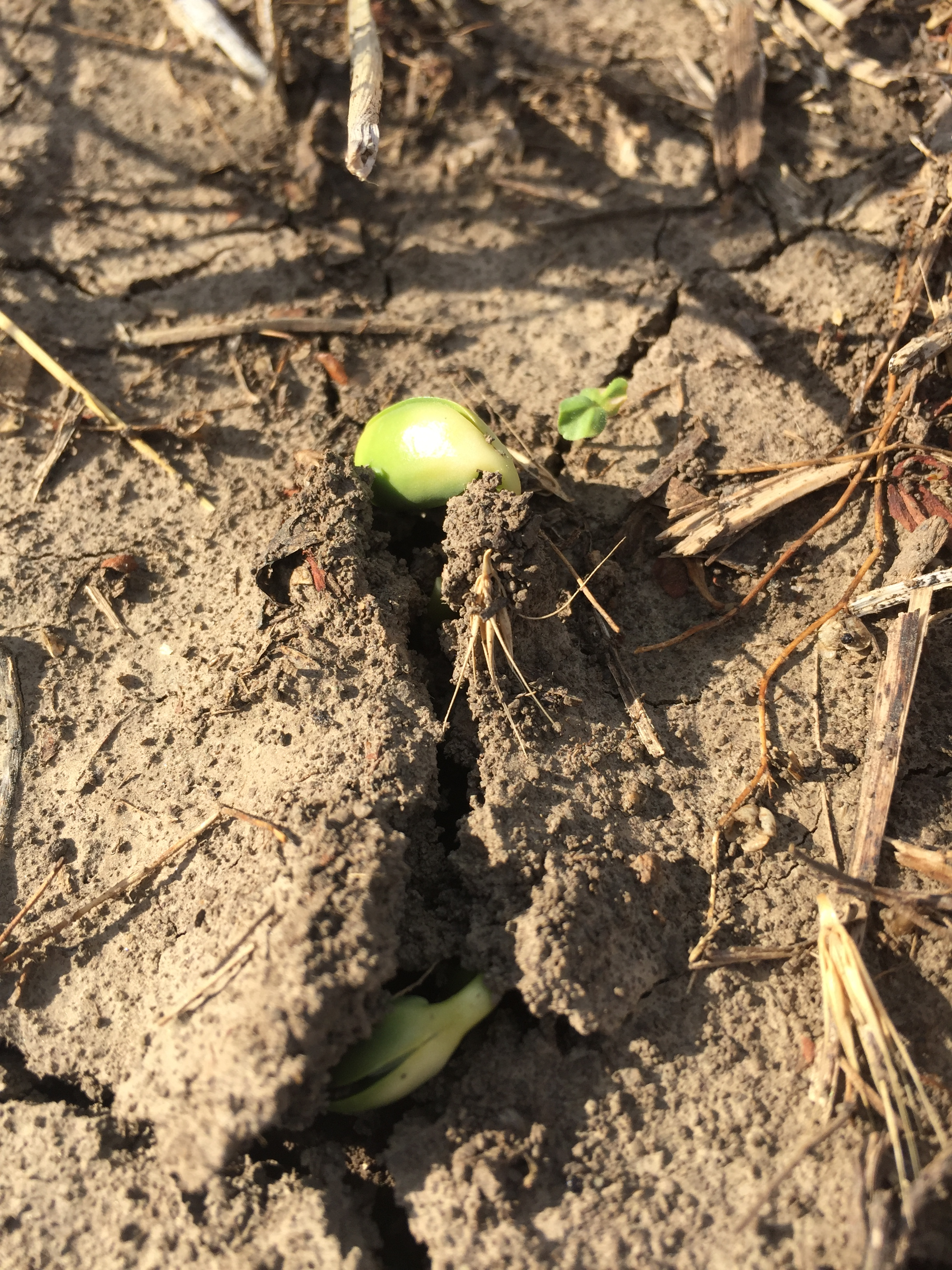
Missouri gumbo soil with soybean seedlings

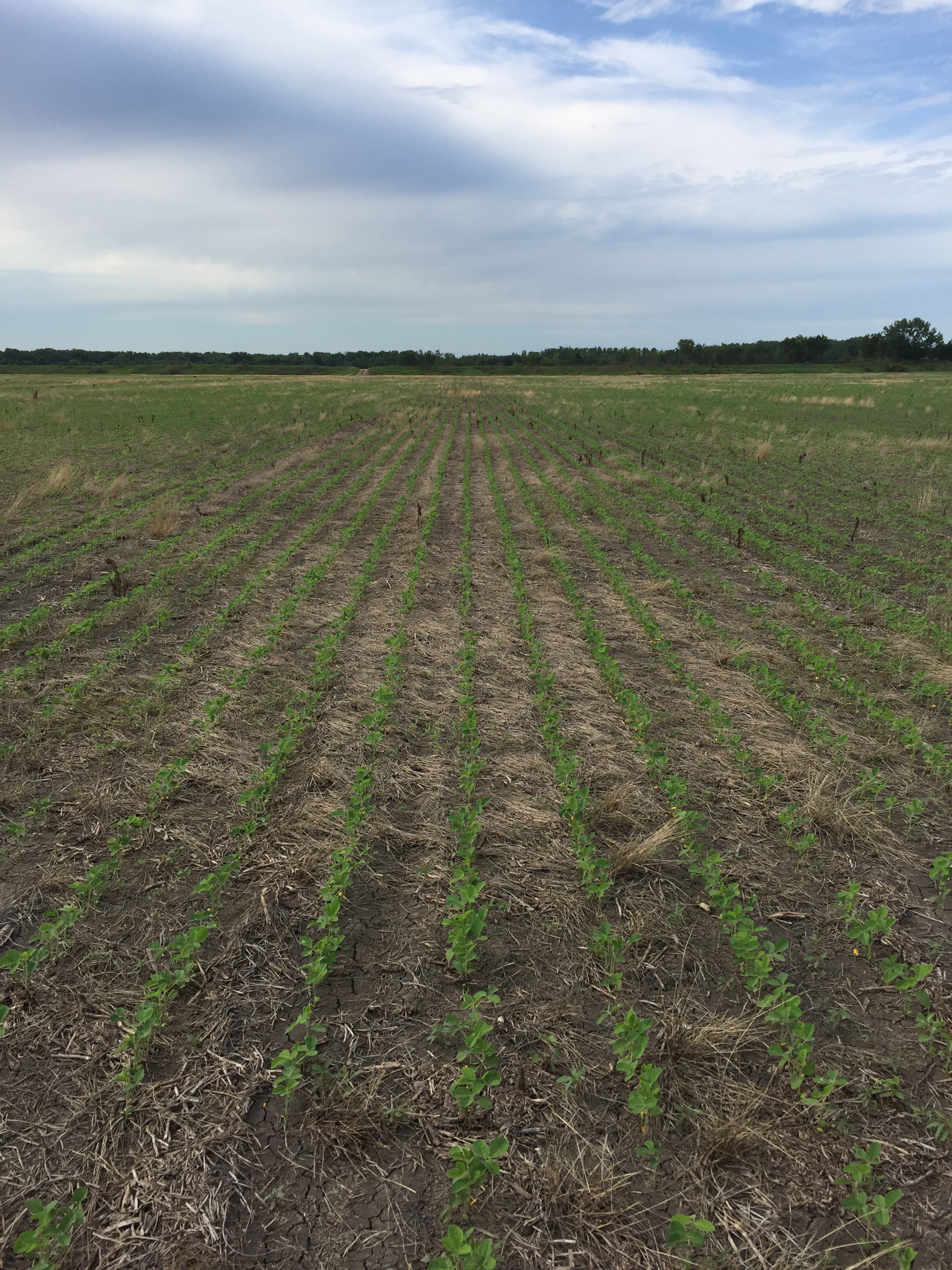
Northern Missouri "no-till" soybean crop in gumbo soil

Gumbo soil is typically defined by the overwhelming presence of very fine particles of clay, but often has small amounts of sand and/or organic material.

Although gumbo soils are exceptional at water retention, they can be difficult to farm, as precipitation will turn gumbo into a unique muddy mess that is challenging to work using large commercial farming equipment. Avoiding tillage of this type of soil through no-till farming appears strongly correlated with higher yields, as compared to more traditional tilling practices.
