= Hamilton Apartments (West Memphis, Arkansas) =

- U.S. National Register of Historic Places
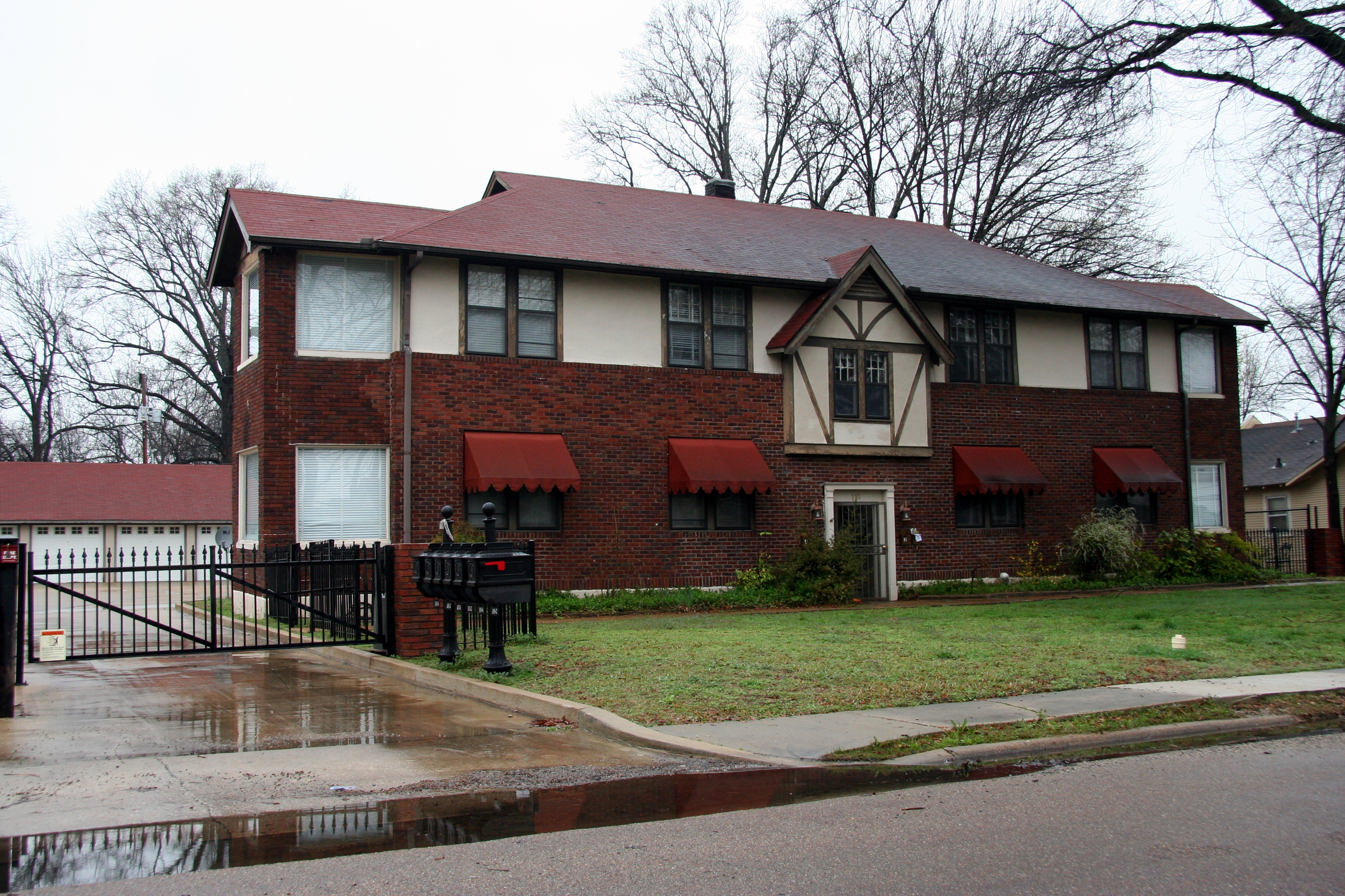
- Hamilton Apartments in 2011

- Location within Arkansas Location within the United States
- Location: 113 W. Danner St., West Memphis, Arkansas
- Coordinates: 35°9′0″N 90°11′8″W
- Area: less than one acre
- Architectural style: Bungalow/craftsman
- NRHP reference No.: 98000618
- Added to NRHP: June 3, 1998

The Hamilton Apartments are a historic apartment house at 113 West Danner Street in West Memphis, Arkansas. It is a two-story brick and stucco structure with a gable-on-hip roof. The first floor is finished in brick veneer up to the base of the second floor windows, while the rest of the exterior is finished in cream-colored stucco. The main entrance is centered on front facade, and there is a projecting bay with gable roof above, finished in stucco with applied half-timber detailing. The interior includes well-preserved period woodwork and plasterwork. Built in 1936, this building is one of a modest number of buildings to survive a major flood of the area the following year, owing to its location on some of the highest ground in the area. The building is also an excellent local example of Craftsman-Tudor Revival styling.

The building was listed on the National Register of Historic Places in 1998.

== See also ==
- National Register of Historic Places listings in Crittenden County, Arkansas
