= Hamilton Apartments (Lancaster, Pennsylvania) =

- U.S. National Register of Historic Places
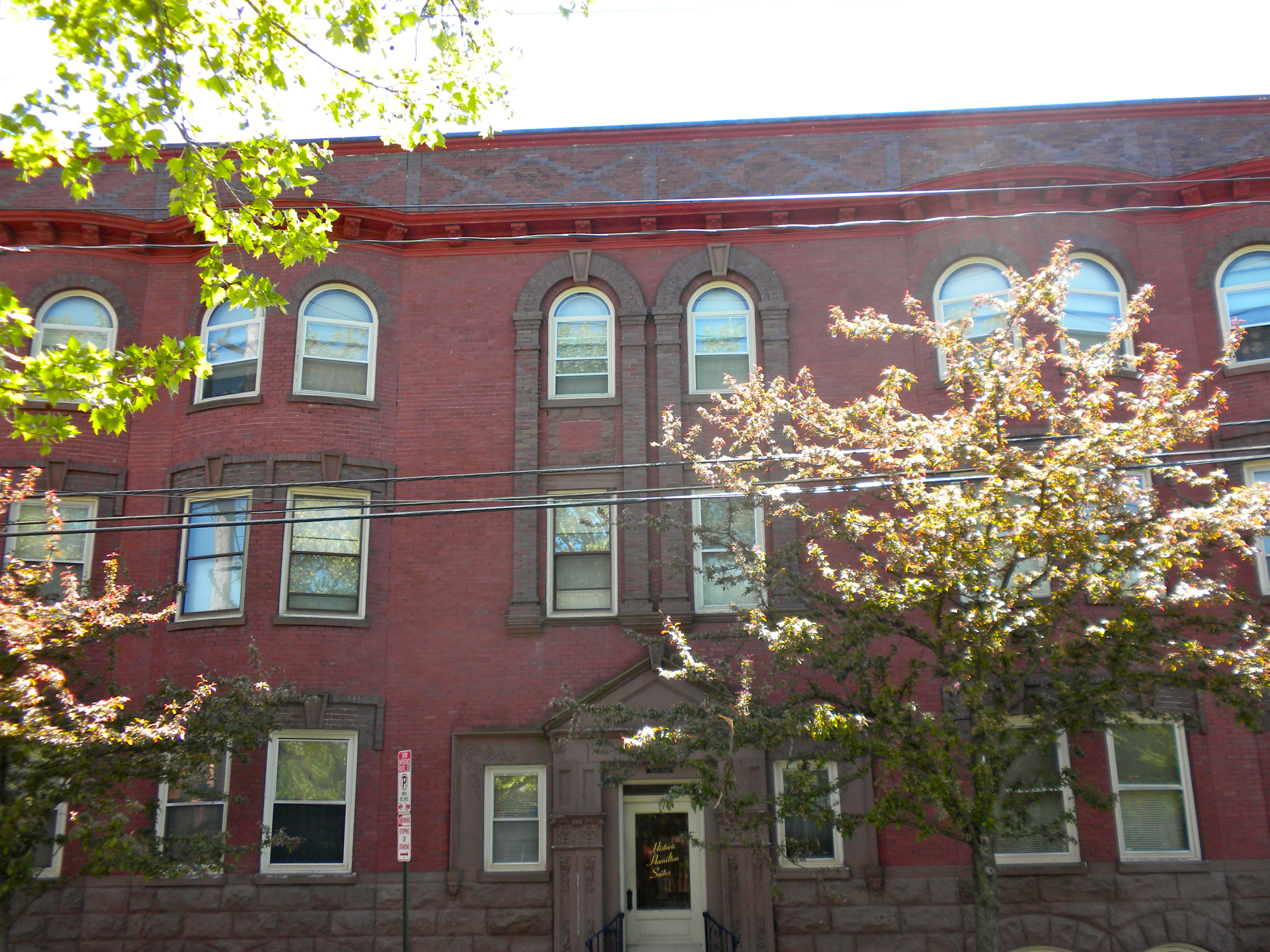
- Hamilton Apartments, April 2010

- Location within Pennsylvania Location within the United States
- Location: 247–249 N. Duke St. and 104–118 E. Walnut St., Lancaster, Pennsylvania
- Coordinates: 40°2′33″N 76°18′23″W
- Area: 0.4 acres (0.16 ha)
- Built: 1906
- Architect: Herman Wohlson
- Architectural style: Chicago, Art Nouveau
- NRHP reference No.: 84003430
- Added to NRHP: June 28, 1984

The Hamilton Apartments are two historic apartment buildings which are located in Lancaster, Lancaster County, Pennsylvania. They were built in 1906, and are three-story brick and stone buildings.

The buildings were added to the National Register of Historic Places in 1984.

== History and architectural features ==
The Historic Hamilton Suites in Lancaster, PA, sold for $3.1 million, or about $50,000 per unit, in a sale between private investors.

The fifty-eight-unit, 38,300-square-foot apartments were built for Hamilton L. Miller, a Chicago businessman, by contractor Herman Wohlsen in the Chicago commercial style, with some Art Nouveau details. It was the first large building in Lancaster used exclusively for apartments.

In 2009, the apartments, together with a small neighboring building, were sold for $3.1 million, or about $50,000 per unit, to a group that included Dan Kreider.
