= Tornado outbreak sequence of May 7–11, 2008 =

Weather event in the United States

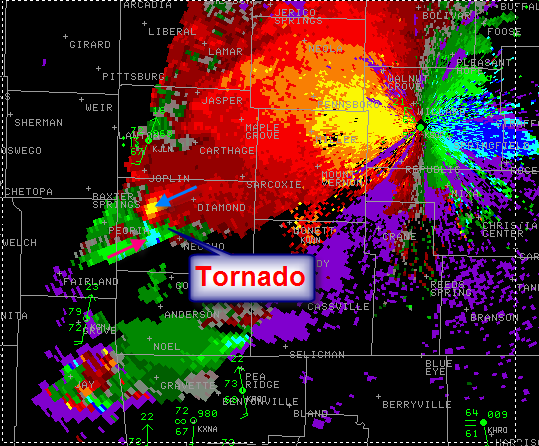
- Velocity scan of the Picher-Neosho tornado located near Racine, Missouri

Meteorological history
- Date: May 7–11, 2008

Tornado outbreak
- Tornadoes: 120
- Max. rating: EF4 tornado
- Duration: ~5 days

Overall effects
- Casualties: 25 (+3 non-tornadic) fatalities, 419 injuries
- Damage: $250.324 million
- Part of the tornado outbreaks of 2008

A long-lived tornado outbreak sequence affected the Southern Plains, the southeastern and Middle Atlantic region of the United States from May 7–11, 2008. The storm produced 120 confirmed tornadoes starting on May 7 and lasting until late on May 11. The outbreak sequence killed 28 people across several states; 25 were killed by tornadoes. The event occurred less than a week after a deadly tornado outbreak that principally affected the state of Arkansas and killed 7 people.

== Meteorological synopsis ==
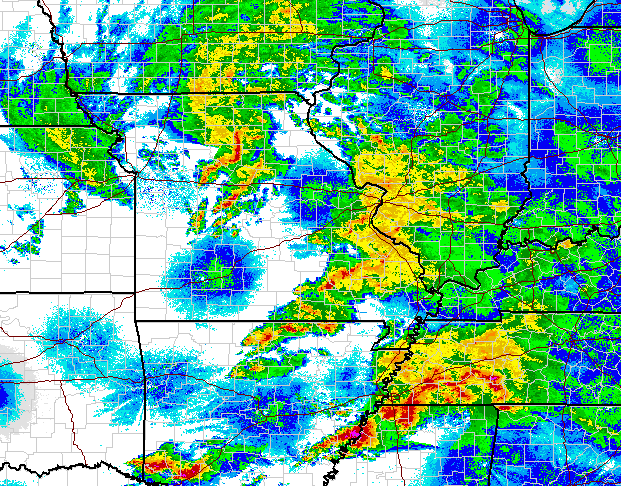
The thunderstorms producing tornadoes over the north-central United States on May 10

The event started in Oklahoma on May 7 as an initial low pressure crossed the southern Plains and produced tornadoes across the Oklahoma City area producing scattered damage throughout the Metro Area including in Yukon, Bethany, Warr Acres and north Oklahoma City. KOCO-TV recorded a 124 miles per hour (200 km/h) wind gust while Chief Meteorologist Rick Mitchell was reporting on the storm. Widespread tree, fence, and minor property damage was reported throughout much of the area while there was also a gas leak reported in Bethany. Tree damage was also reported just outside the KFOR and KOCO stations. Similar conditions occurred south and east of Tulsa, Oklahoma, as the line of thunderstorms raced across the state and caused similar damage although a portions of a storage structure was destroyed by the force of the winds. At least five tornadoes were confirmed throughout the state but all were rated either EF0 or EF1. There were no reports of injuries during the event.

Two significant tornado outbreaks affected the southeastern United States on May 8. During the morning hours, tornadoes touched down across northeastern Mississippi including one EF3 tornado in the Tupelo, Mississippi area which heavily damaged several buildings near the Tupelo Airport. Tornadoes also touched down across northwestern Alabama north and west of Birmingham and Huntsville. One particular tornado was caught on tape by a security camera at a business near Leighton in Colbert County which overturned cars at a parking lot. Another tornado crossed very near the ABC 33-40 Sky Cam in Cullman but the tornado was not seen as very strong winds stopped the video data prior to its passage. Structural damage was also reported to homes across the area.

While weak tornadoes touched down north of Xenia, Ohio, during the early evening hours, the second outbreak of the day produced several strong tornadoes across the western Carolinas and southwestern Virginia. A line of showers and thunderstorms moved across the Appalachians. CAPE values were at around 1500 J/kg across parts of North Carolina. One tornado hit the Clemmons, North Carolina area producing EF3 damage to several homes. The same area was hit an F3 tornado on the same date in 1998. Just after 11:00 pm, another tornado from the same supercell struck the western Greensboro region, killing one person inside a truck overturned by the tornado. The storm also damaged several buildings including homes, businesses and warehouses. Two FedEx planes at the Piedmont Triad International Airport were pitched off the tarmac as the storm lifted near the area. Other tornadoes produced some significant damage north of the Piedmont Triad region across southern Virginia.

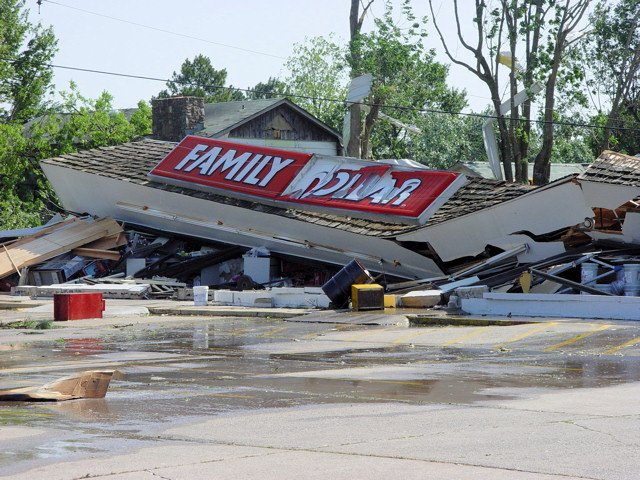
Business destroyed east of Little Rock by an EF3 tornado on May 10, 2008(NWS Little Rock)

On May 10, a new wave of tornadoes from a second system affected portions of the southern Plains and the Lower-Mississippi Valley. Temperatures across the region reached the 80s across portions of the South with mostly upper 70s elsewhere. CAPE values were between 1000 and 2000 J/kg near the center of the low with reading over 2000 J/kg across Mississippi. Storm relative helicity values were over 250 m^{2}/s^{2}. A moderate risk of severe storms was issued for a large portions of the Mississippi Valley as well as the Eastern Plains. Severe storms began to occur across northwestern Arkansas, southeastern Kansas and eastern Oklahoma during the late afternoon hours. Tornado watches extended from eastern Oklahoma to South Carolina and north to near Kansas City.

One violent EF4 tornado killed 15 people in Missouri and six people in northeastern Oklahoma, with one other death from an EF1 tornado also in Missouri. Moderate to major damage was reported across Ottawa County, Oklahoma, and Newton County, Missouri, as well as in Stuttgart, Arkansas, and near McAlester, Oklahoma, where a tornado was caught on tape by a television crew from a helicopter. Other tornadoes were reported across Missouri, Oklahoma, Arkansas and Kansas. In the late evening, after crossing the Mississippi River, the supercells combined into a bow echo/derecho that tracked from the Memphis Metropolitan Area then across northern Mississippi, Alabama, Georgia and South Carolina, with widespread wind damage and embedded tornadoes. Two people were killed in Laurens County, Georgia, and at least 85,000 customers were left without power in the Atlanta metropolitan area.

Additional tornadoes touched down across the southeast and the eastern Ohio Valley from central Ohio to North Carolina but the bulk of the activity took place across central and southern Georgia where 19 tornadoes were confirmed in that state alone. An EF2 tornado went through the city of Macon, Georgia, causing extensive damage to buildings and trees at Macon State College. This forced the closure of the Macon campus for repair. A violent EF4 tornado was also confirmed near Darien in McIntosh County where numerous buildings near Interstate 95 were heavily damaged or destroyed. This was the first violent tornado in Georgia since an F4 tornado hit four counties north of Atlanta on March 27, 1994. The tornado that occurred during the 1994 Palm Sunday tornado outbreak killed three and injured 20 over a nearly 50-mile path. Georgia Governor Sonny Perdue declared a state of emergency for at least six counties across the state. In addition to the tornado fatalities, one person was killed due to straight line winds in Barrow County, Georgia.

== Confirmed tornadoes ==
Confirmed tornadoes by Enhanced Fujita rating
EFU	EF0	EF1	EF2	EF3	EF4	EF5	Total
0	49	41	23	5	2	0	120

=== Picher, Oklahoma/Neosho, Missouri ===
Picher, Oklahoma/Neosho, Missouri
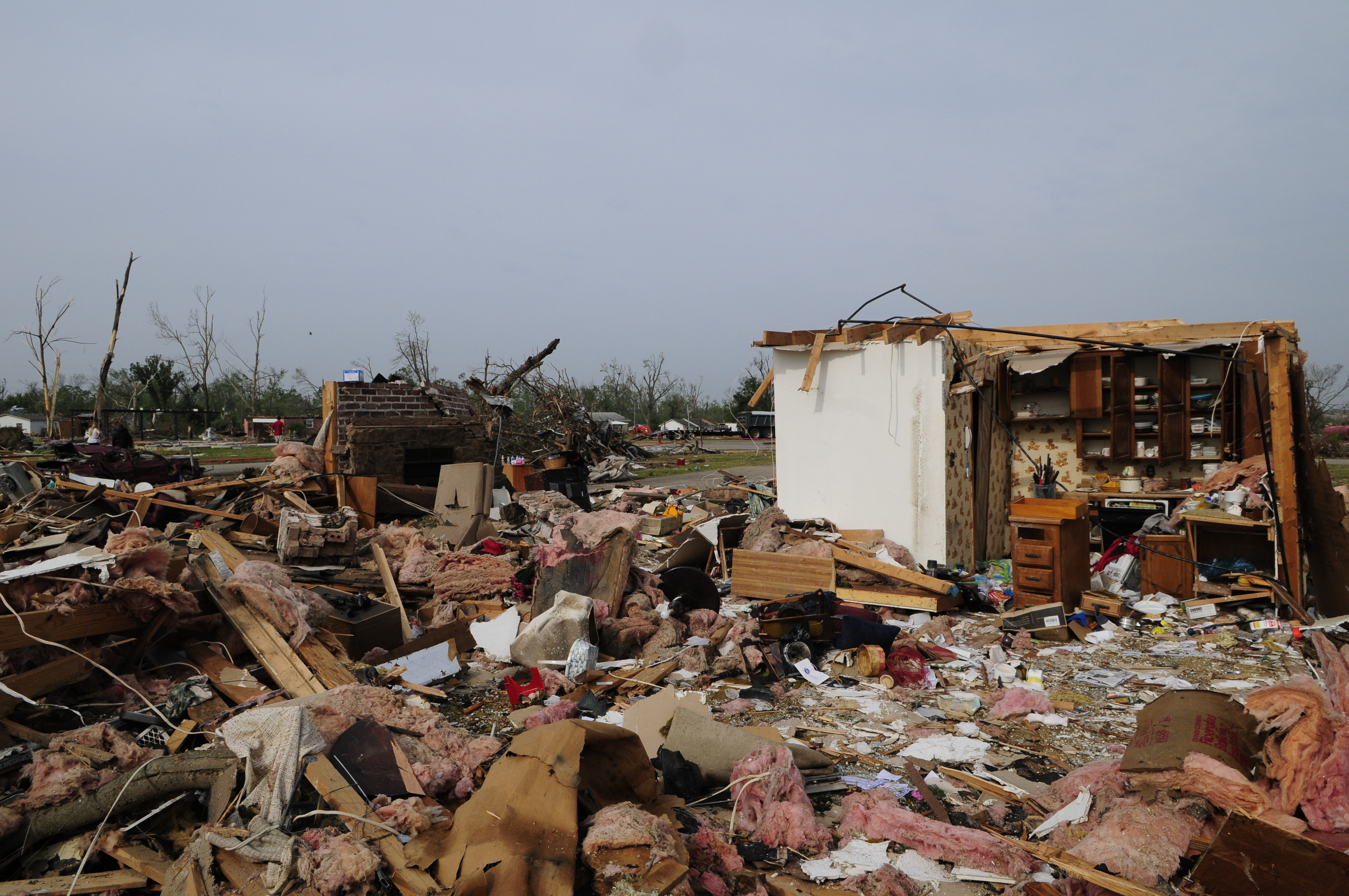
- A house suffered heavy damage in Picher, Oklahoma.

Meteorological history
- Formed: May 10, 2008, 5:20 p.m. CDT (UTC−05:00)
- Dissipated: May 10, 2008, 6:55 p.m. CDT (UTC−05:00)
- Duration: 1 hour, 35 minutes

EF4 tornado
- on the Enhanced Fujita scale
- Highest winds: 175 mph (282 km/h)

Overall effects
- Casualties: 21 fatalities, 350 injuries

This violent and deadly tornado first touched down near the Kansas–Oklahoma border in Oklahoma southwest of Chetopa, Kansas and tracked eastward. It then slammed into Picher with devastating results. Twenty blocks of the town suffered extensive damage with houses and businesses destroyed or flattened, and some swept away. The damage in Picher was rated EF4. At least 150 others were injured in Picher alone. The tornado continued eastward, passing just north of Quapaw and Peoria before crossing Interstate 44 into Missouri. This was the deadliest tornado in Oklahoma since the South Oklahoma City F5 tornado on May 3, 1999, which killed 36.

Most of the fatalities in Missouri were reported near the Racine community at the intersection of Route 43 and Iris Road, northwest of Neosho, where automobiles were thrown as far as 1/2 mile (800 m) away. Nearly 20 people were hospitalized in Newton County. At the time, it was the deadliest single tornado in Missouri since a tornado hit the St. Louis Metro area on February 10, 1959, killing 21, and the deadliest outbreak for that state since May 4, 2003, where 19 were killed. That record stood for three years until an EF5 tornado struck Joplin on May 22, 2011, killing 158 people. (Interestingly, the Joplin tornado touched down just a few miles north of the path of the Picher/Neosho tornado.)

The tornado continued eastward toward Granby, Missouri. It passed very close to the intersection of US 60 and Route 59 about three miles west of Granby, destroying a church building and numerous homes/buildings as it passed through. The tornado continued southeastward and crossed Route B about 1 mile south of Granby. The area surrounding Granby's cemetery and rodeo grounds took heavy damage. The tornado continued eastward toward the village of Newtonia. There were no reported storm related deaths in the area surrounding Granby.

=== Darien–Ridgeville, Georgia ===
Darien–Ridgeville, Georgia
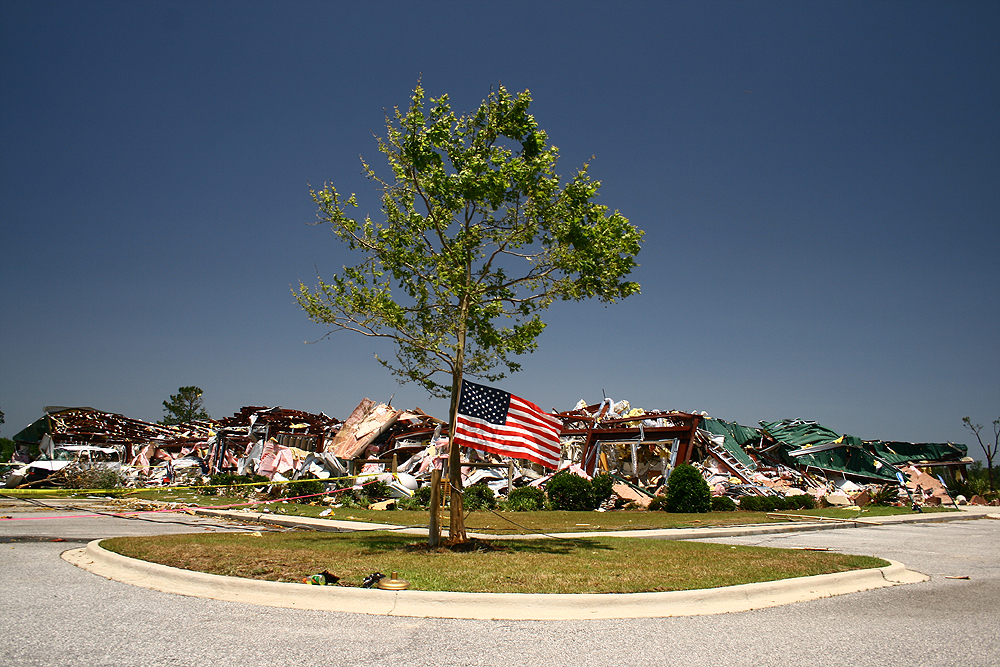
- a building destroyed by the tornado at EF4 intensity

Meteorological history
- Formed: May 11, 2008, 9:52 a.m. EDT (UTC−05:00)
- Dissipated: May 11, 2008, 10:07 a.m. EDT (UTC-05:00)
- Duration: 15 minutes

EF4 tornado
- on the Enhanced Fujita scale
- Highest winds: 170–180 mph (270–290 km/h)

Overall effects
- Casualties: 9 injuries
- Damage: $12.50 million (2008 USD)

This short lived yet violent tornado first touched down approximately 3 miles (4.8 km) northwest of Darien in a heavily wooded area. Numerous trees were quickly snapped off. The tornado began to rapidly intensify as it approached Route 251. The tornado struck a Marines Sales and Service Business located on the eastern side of Route 251. The building had all of its anchor bolts besides one snapped off above the concrete slab, with the exception of the one metal support beam that was bent into the ground. The slab itself was wiped clean away. Approximately 50 boats were tossed and completely destroyed. One 18 feet (5.5 m) 4,000 pounds (1,800 kg) boat was carried for a total 650 yards (590 m) through multiple trees, and another 32 feet (9.8 m) 8,000 pounds (3,600 kg) boat was carried for about 130 yards (120 m) and dropped on top of the Gateway Behavioral Services Building. One 125 horsepower boat motor weighing 300–350 pounds (140–160 kg) was carried 250 yards (230 m) and deposited into the roof of a building. Several other nearby vehicles were tossed or rolled, and were also severely damaged or completely destroyed. Nobody was in the building at the time the tornado struck.

As the tornado continued to track eastward, it approached and hit the McIntosh Emergency Medical Building, resulting in the building being completely destroyed. Additional damage occurred to multiple ambulances and trucks. Many of the metal support beams holding this facility to its foundations were snapped and ripped away. Nobody was in the building at the time the tornado hit. The Gateway Behavioral Health and Services Building was completely destroyed, with the roof and many exterior walls collapsed, with portions of the roof even dragged onto Interstate 95, and some of the roofing materials found over 11 miles (18 km) on Sapelo Island. Nine people sheltering inside the building were injured. Six vehicles near the building were damaged or destroyed and a metal light pole and several trees were snapped in this area. The tornado would hit two other businesses at EF4 intensity, including the Marine Sales and Services Business and the Gateway Behavioral Health and Services Building.

After leaving this area, the tornado began to weaken, and would reach its maximum width of 700 yards (640 m), before shrinking back down to 200–500 yards (180–460 m) wide for the remainder of its path. The Tornado damaged or destroyed four billboards along Interstate 95, produced mainly minor roof damage to several dozen homes mainly in the Ridgeville area, snapped off or uprooted thousands of trees, some of them falling on homes or vehicles, and damaged or destroyed numerous outbuildings. A resident of Ridgeville whose home suffered minor damage in the Tornado, took shelter in a closet after seeing a National Weather Service Severe Weather Statement on the television mentioning that Ridgeville was in the path of the Tornado. The Tornado also damaged the Blue-N-Hall Marina and Fishing Dock. In this area, a large boat hoist along with 18 boats and several boat trailers were damaged or destroyed. Several power poles were also snapped off and several vehicles were damaged. Numerous trees were also snapped off on Hird Island. The Tornado likely dissipated over Doboy Sound as a waterspout. Besides portions of the Gateway roof, lots of other debris including signs were deposited on Sapelo Island. The tornado would further weaken and dissipate at 10:07 p.m. EDT.

== See also ==
- List of North American tornadoes and tornado outbreaks
- Tornado outbreak of May 1–3, 2008
- Tornado outbreak of May 22–27, 2008
