= Tornado outbreak of May 1–3, 2008 =

Weather event in the United States

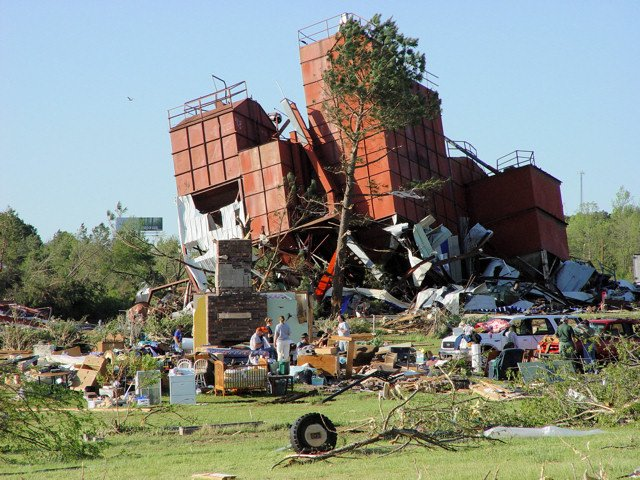
- Tornado damage in Damascus, Arkansas on May 2, 2008

Meteorological history
- Date: May 1–3, 2008

Tornado outbreak
- Tornadoes: 60
- Max. rating: EF3 tornado
- Duration: 30 hours

Overall effects
- Casualties: 6 fatalities (+1 non-tornadic), 45 injuries
- Damage: $81.4 million
- Areas affected: Central and Southern United States
- Part of the tornado outbreaks of 2008

A destructive and deadly tornado outbreak that took place across the Southern and Central United States from May 1 to May 3, 2008. The outbreak was responsible for at least seven fatalities (six from tornadoes) and 23 injuries in Arkansas. There were at least 29 tornado reports from Iowa to Oklahoma on May 1 and 67 more in Arkansas, Missouri, Mississippi, Tennessee, Louisiana and Texas on May 2. A total of 60 tornadoes were confirmed by weather authorities.

== Meteorological synopsis ==
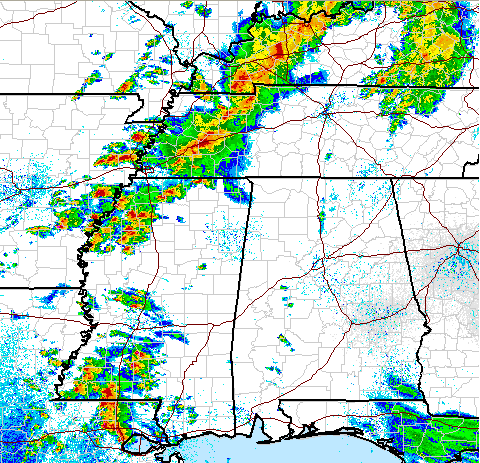
NEXRAD weather radars composite image of the thunderstorms producing tornadoes in the south-central United States

On May 1, 2008, a large low pressure system developed over Nebraska, with a long warm front stretching east towards the Great Lakes. A cold front and dry line were situated across Oklahoma and Kansas during the late afternoon. The Storm Prediction Center (SPC) issued a moderate risk of severe weather for eastern Kansas and a small part of Missouri, which included Kansas City. On May 2 another moderate risk of severe weather was issued by the SPC from Central Illinois to northern Louisiana. The risk area was later revised southward to only include eastern Arkansas, western Tennessee, and northwestern Mississippi. Most of the severe weather shifted into Arkansas where dewpoints were near 70 °F (21 °C) with CAPE values over 2000 j/kg (in some places up to 3000 j/kg) and helicity values (potential for rotating winds) were exceeding 200 m2/s2.

While most of the severe activity was situated across the southern states, tornado watches were also issued for portions of southern Wisconsin, southern Michigan and northern Indiana as activity developed near the center of the low. No tornadoes were reported in this watch area.

On the northern fringes of the storm system heavy snow fell across northeastern Wyoming and western South Dakota. The town of Lead, South Dakota received a total of 54.5 inches, or about 4.5 feet (1.4 m) of snow from April 30 to May 2. Several other areas received one – four feet (30 – 120 cm) of snow.

== Confirmed tornadoes ==
Confirmed tornadoes by Enhanced Fujita rating
EFU	EF0	EF1	EF2	EF3	EF4	EF5	Total
0	28	19	10	3	0	0	60

=== May 1 event ===
List of confirmed tornadoes – Thursday, May 1, 2008 (Note: All dates are based on the local time zone where the tornado touched down; however, all times are in Coordinated Universal Time for consistency.)
EF#	Location	County / Parish	State	Start Coord.	Time (UTC)	Path length	Max width	Summary
EF0	S of Elk Falls	Elk	KS	37.36°N 96.18°W	23:50–23:51	0.7 mi (1.1 km)	50 yd (46 m)	A trained spotter observed a brief tornado.
EF0	SW of Sioux Center	Sioux	IA	43.0391°N 96.236°W	23:55–23:56	0.1 mi (0.16 km)	50 yd (46 m)	A trained spotter observed a brief tornado.
EF2	S of Rock Valley to SE of Inwood	Sioux, Lyon	IA	43.1421°N 96.3°W	23:59–00:24	12.95 mi (20.84 km)	400 yd (370 m)	This strong tornado impacted several farms, causing extensive damage to numerous barns, sheds, outbuildings, and grain bins. Many trees and power poles were snapped or uprooted along the tornado's path.
EF0	ESE of Plattsburg	Clinton	MO	39.56°N 94.42°W	00:26–00:27	0.1 mi (0.16 km)	25 yd (23 m)	A trained spotter observed a brief tornado.
EF0	NW of Choctaw	Oklahoma	OK	35.5002°N 97.2826°W	00:29	0.1 mi (0.16 km)	20 yd (18 m)	A brief tornado damaged trees and an outbuilding.
EF0	E of Doon	Lyon	IA	43.28°N 96.1902°W	00:30–00:31	0.1 mi (0.16 km)	50 yd (46 m)	A trained spotter observed a brief tornado.
EF0	NNE of Buxton	Wilson	KS	37.4908°N 95.899°W	00:35–00:37	0.67 mi (1.08 km)	50 yd (46 m)	A storm chaser observed a brief tornado.
EF0	E of Fredonia	Wilson	KS	37.5332°N 95.7937°W	00:38–00:39	0.58 mi (0.93 km)	50 yd (46 m)	A trained spotter observed a brief tornado.
EF0	ENE of Glencoe	Payne	OK	36.2411°N 96.8968°W	00:42	0.3 mi (0.48 km)	75 yd (69 m)	A brief tornado was reported over open fields.
EF0	S of Sheldon	O'Brien	IA	43.1366°N 95.87°W	00:42–00:43	0.1 mi (0.16 km)	50 yd (46 m)	A storm chaser observed a brief tornado.
EF0	W of George	Lyon	IA	43.35°N 96.0398°W	00:44–00:45	0.1 mi (0.16 km)	50 yd (46 m)	A trained spotter observed a brief tornado.
EF0	NW of Ashton	Osceola	IA	43.33°N 95.79°W	01:05–01:06	0.1 mi (0.16 km)	50 yd (46 m)	A storm chaser observed a brief tornado.
EF0	NE of Pawnee	Pawnee	OK	36.3402°N 96.7873°W	01:18	0.3 mi (0.48 km)	75 yd (69 m)	A storm chaser observed a brief tornado.
EF0	NNE of Petrolia	Allen	KS	37.78°N 95.45°W	01:21–01:23	1.89 mi (3.04 km)	75 yd (69 m)	A storm chaser observed a brief tornado.
EF1	NW of Skedee	Pawnee	OK	36.4012°N 96.734°W	01:25–01:35	3 mi (4.8 km)	300 yd (270 m)	One home was damaged while several trees and power poles were downed.
EF1	SSE of Fairfax to WSW of Pawhuska	Osage	OK	36.4497°N 96.638°W	01:37–02:12	17 mi (27 km)	450 yd (410 m)	This long-tracked tornado moved through the Osage Reservation, leaving behind extensive tree damage. Two homes suffered roof damage.
EF0	WSW of Pawhuska	Osage	OK	36.5779°N 96.4448°W	02:06–02:17	5 mi (8.0 km)	100 yd (91 m)	Power lines were downed and trees were damaged.
EF0	Belton	Cass	MO	38.82°N 94.53°W	02:08–02:09	0.1 mi (0.16 km)	25 yd (23 m)	Local law enforcement reported brief tornado.
EF0	SW of Chanute	Neosho	KS	37.6488°N 95.505°W	02:14–02:15	0.73 mi (1.17 km)	60 yd (55 m)	Local law enforcement reported a brief tornado.
EF0	N of Earlton	Neosho	KS	37.59°N 95.47°W	02:44–02:45	0.38 mi (0.61 km)	50 yd (46 m)	A trained spotter observed a brief tornado.
EF0	E of Savonburg	Allen	KS	37.752°N 95.1373°W	02:51–02:52	0.64 mi (1.03 km)	40 yd (37 m)	Local emergency management reported a brief tornado.

=== May 2 event ===
List of confirmed tornadoes – Friday, May 2, 2008
EF#	Location	County / Parish	State	Start Coord.	Time (UTC)	Path length	Max width	Summary
EF0	NE of Lyndon	Osage	KS	38.6405°N 95.6538°W	05:43–05:45	1.5 mi (2.4 km)	30 yd (27 m)	One home had its roof lifted off and dropped back onto it while the rest of the structure sustained minor damage. A three car garage was destroyed, with a motor home inside damaged, and debris was lofted 100 yd (91 m) downstream into a cemetery.
EF2	NW of Clinton	Douglas	KS	38.9712°N 95.4458°W	06:04–06:06	2.22 mi (3.57 km)	100 yd (91 m)	This brief but strong tornado moved two-thirds of a home and its garage off their foundations. Debris from these structures were strewn up to 500 yd (460 m) away.
EF0	S of Bristow	Creek	OK	35.8155°N 96.38°W	06:45–06:51	7 mi (11 km)	250 yd (230 m)	A barn was destroyed and trees and power lines were downed.
EF3	NW of Liberty	Clay	MO	39.2929°N 94.4903°W	06:56–07:00	0.92 mi (1.48 km)	75 yd (69 m)	A brief but intense tornado touched down along the north side of a bow echo, destroying 4 homes and damaging 117 others. Total damage is estimated at $4 million.
EF2	Gladstone	Clay	MO	39.2215°N 94.5767°W	07:03–07:08	1.39 mi (2.24 km)	75 yd (69 m)	The same bow echo that produced the preceding EF3 tornado produced another strong tornado farther south. This storm tracked directly through Gladstone, causing extensive damage. A total of 20 homes were destroyed, 280 suffered damage, and a further 19 businesses were damaged. Total losses were estimated to be $10 million.
EF1	W of Pryor	Mayes	OK	36.3°N 95.4098°W	08:03	0.5 mi (0.80 km)	100 yd (91 m)	A brief tornado downed trees and power lines and severely damaged the roof of one home.
EF1	ENE of Tiawah to N of Pryor	Rogers, Mayes	OK	36.3106°N 95.4428°W	08:03–08:15	9 mi (14 km)	100 yd (91 m)	Several homes suffered roof damage and two people were injured. Numerous trees and power poles were damaged along the tornado's path.
EF0	SW of Ava	Douglas	MO	36.8798°N 92.7995°W	10:52–10:58	7.38 mi (11.88 km)	250 yd (230 m)	Numerous trees were damaged along this tornado's path.
EF0	NNW of Ava	Douglas	MO	36.9596°N 92.6551°W	11:02–11:03	0.35 mi (0.56 km)	100 yd (91 m)	A brief tornado damaged trees and one home.
EF3	NW of Springfield to N of Damascus to NNW of Drasco	Conway, Van Buren, Cleburne	AR	36.9596°N 92.6551°W	13:15–14:14	45.3 mi (72.9 km)	1,600 yd (1,500 m)	5 deaths – See section on this tornado – 24 people were injured.
EF1	WSW of Damascus	Van Buren	AR	35.3747°N 92.4444°W	13:28–13:30	1.05 mi (1.69 km)	100 yd (91 m)	This was a satellite tornado to the EF3 Springfield–Drasco tornado, tracking simultaneously 0.5 mi (0.80 km) to its southeast. The tornado downed trees along its path.
EF1	N of Canton	Van Zandt	TX	32.5596°N 95.871°W	13:30–13:34	1.33 mi (2.14 km)	75 yd (69 m)	A weak tornado tracked through the north side of Canton, causing extensive tree damage. Several of these trees fell onto cars. Damage to structures was limited to two homes and a shed. The tornado tracked through the First Monday Trade Days site, injuring eight people in the area.
EF1	SE of Umpire	Howard	AR	34.241°N 94.026°W	14:03–14:08	4.1 mi (6.6 km)	50 yd (46 m)	Numerous trees were snapped or uprooted along this tornado's path, one of which damaged a mobile home. Two barns were destroyed.
EF1	WNW of Billstown	Pike	AR	33.9905°N 93.6297°W	15:23–15:33	8.18 mi (13.16 km)	200 yd (180 m)	Two chicken houses were badly damaged, one of which collapse, and a barn had a large portion of its roof torn off.
EF2	SE of Tull to Keo to S of Lonoke	Grant, Saline, Pulaski, Lonoke	AR	34.4116°N 92.4916°W	16:15–17:15	40.72 mi (65.53 km)	300 yd (270 m)	1 death – A strong tornado began in Grant County, destroying 3 mobile homes, heavily damaging a house, and downing 2 large, steel, electrical transmission towers. It entered Saline County, impacting 16 homes; 4 were destroyed, 9 sustained major damage, and 3 suffered minor damage. In Pulaski County, it affected 75 homes, of which 21 were destroyed, 16 suffered major damage, 26 sustained minor damage, and the remainder experienced minimal damage. A woman was killed inside her demolished mobile home. Two more large, steel, electrical transmission towers were downed. The tornado then entered Lonoke County, where 2 houses were destroyed, 2 homes and 2 farm shops sustained roof damage, and power poles and grain bins were downed. A fish farm, 2 more farm shops, and 5 large, steel, electrical transmission towers were damaged or destroyed. Numerous trees were downed. Three people were injured.
EF1	NE of Henderson	Rusk	TX	32.183°N 94.764°W	16:21–16:26	6.38 mi (10.27 km)	100 yd (91 m)	A large metal building was completely destroyed, a house suffered minor damage, and numerous trees were snapped or uprooted. A hay barn was partially demolished.
EF2	N of Carthage to Sheridan	Dallas, Grant	AR	34.1397°N 92.5842°W	16:23–16:57	22.85 mi (36.77 km)	200 yd (180 m)	Manufactured homes and mobile homes were damaged or destroyed. Minor damage to well-built homes. Barns and outbuildings were destroyed and a church was damaged. In total, about 60 structures were damaged.
EF1	SW of Beckville	Panola	TX	32.202°N 94.524°W	16:55–17:03	3.79 mi (6.10 km)	200 yd (180 m)	A manufactured home lost its roof and other homes were damaged due to fallen trees.
EF1	Carlisle	Lonoke	AR	34.7743°N 91.7574°W	17:56–18:02	2.55 mi (4.10 km)	200 yd (180 m)	A tornado directly struck the town of Carlisle, damaging 25 homes, the fire station, an old railroad depot, a storage garage, an automotive repair garage, a beauty shop, and a minnow farm. Multiple trees, power lines, and power poles were downed as well.
EF0	WNW of Cotton Plant	Woodruff	AR	35.012°N 91.3395°W	18:01–18:07	2.09 mi (3.36 km)	50 yd (46 m)	Two metal-roofed structures had sheets of metal damaged or ripped off. Trees were damaged.
EF1	NE of Carlisle	Lonoke, Prairie	AR	34.803°N 91.6987°W	18:02–18:04	1.68 mi (2.70 km)	250 yd (230 m)	Trees were downed.
EF1	NW of Hazen	Prairie	AR	34.8461°N 91.6382°W	18:05–18:06	2.58 mi (4.15 km)	100 yd (91 m)	Approximately two dozen trees were damaged and a power pole was toppled.
EF0	NE of Senath	Dunklin	MO	36.1505°N 90.1447°W	18:39–18:40	0.29 mi (0.47 km)	25 yd (23 m)	A section of a center pivot irrigation system was flipped, and a barn sustained moderate damage.
EF0	S of Cotton Plant	Monroe	AR	34.9556°N 91.2622°W	18:40–18:41	0.35 mi (0.56 km)	50 yd (46 m)	One tree was uprooted and tin was removed from barns.
EF2	Etowah	Mississippi	AR	35.6899°N 90.2371°W	19:54–19:58	3.38 mi (5.44 km)	150 yd (140 m)	A strong tornado moved through Etowah, inflicting major damage to two homes, ripping the roof off a third, and tearing the back structure off of a fourth; four other homes sustained moderate damage and one sustained minor damage. A car dealership and ten accompanied vehicles in the car lot were completely destroyed. Numerous trees, power poles, and power lines were toppled, and several outbuildings were demolished. A mobile home was destroyed while a recreational vehicle and an irrigation system were overturned. One person was injured.
EF3	SE of Parkin to Earle to S of Birdsong	Cross, Crittenden, Mississippi	AR	35.2329°N 90.5188°W	20:18–20:48	20.23 mi (32.56 km)	400 yd (370 m)	A significant tornado touched down in Cross County, causing minimal damage. It continued into Crittenden County where it intensified to EF3 strength, severely damaging a high school, a church, a number of homes, and a large house in Earle; four serious injuries occurred there. After progressing into Heafer, a number of homes suffered significant damage. Two mobile homes were destroyed, and several trees and power lines were toppled. The tornado caused minor tree damage in Mississippi County before dissipating.
EF0	E of Livingston	Livingston	LA	30.5°N 90.666°W	20:51–20:53	0.1 mi (0.16 km)	20 yd (18 m)	Weak tornado reported by a motorist near Interstate 12. No damage occurred.
EF2	WSW of Dyersburg	Dyer	TN	35.96°N 89.6665°W	21:25–21:27	1.37 mi (2.20 km)	40 yd (37 m)	A mobile home was destroyed and power lines were downed.
EF2	W of New Albany	Union	MS	34.462°N 89.1634°W	22:48–22:52	3.11 mi (5.01 km)	440 yd (400 m)	About 20 homes suffered varying degrees of damage, the worst of which had their roofs ripped off and exterior walls damaged. A couple of sheds, a gas station canopy and sign, and several large buildings were damaged. A church suffered roof damage and had its steeple toppled. A large bus was flipped onto its side, and numerous trees were snapped or uprooted.
EF2	New Albany	Union	MS	34.5087°N 89.0342°W	23:00–23:01	0.52 mi (0.84 km)	100 yd (91 m)	About 10 homes were damaged, including two that lost their roofs and saw some exterior wall collapse. A gas station canopy was damaged, and many trees were snapped or uprooted.
EF1	NE of New Albany	Union	MS	34.5265°N 88.9426°W	23:12–23:16	3.46 mi (5.57 km)	75 yd (69 m)	Two homes sustained roof damage; one had its porch torn off while the second saw partial collapse of its garage wall. Several grain bins were heavily damaged, a shed was destroyed, and numerous trees were uprooted.
EF1	Booneville to Rienzi	Prentiss, Alcorn	MS	34.6331°N 88.6779°W	23:41–00:03	13.77 mi (22.16 km)	150 yd (140 m)	Several homes had shingles ripped off or were damaged by fallen trees. Several outbuildings were heavily damaged or destroyed.
EF2	NW of Lake Village	Chicot	AR	33.36°N 91.4°W	23:52–00:10	10.52 mi (16.93 km)	400 yd (370 m)	A mobile home was flipped and destroyed. Several sheds, barns, outbuildings, and carports were damaged or destroyed. A 50 ft (15 m) antenna and fencing were toppled, two boats were damaged, the roll-up door for a tractor shed was damaged, and a trampoline was tossed 75 yd (69 m). Fifteen power poles were snapped.
EF0	SW of Benoit	Washington, Bolivar	MS	33.5113°N 91.1206°W	00:32–00:35	2.96 mi (4.76 km)	50 yd (46 m)	A little debris was thrown across a field.
EF0	NW of Mer Rouge	Morehouse	LA	32.8032°N 91.8378°W	01:01–01:06	3.3 mi (5.3 km)	50 yd (46 m)	Trees suffered minor damage and grass was flattened.
EF1	NE of Benoit	Bolivar	MS	33.6729°N 90.9225°W	01:07–01:21	9.69 mi (15.59 km)	200 yd (180 m)	Numerous trees were snapped or uprooted. Power lines were snapped in one location.
EF1	SW of Clarksville	Montgomery	TN	36.37°N 87.55°W	03:55–?	5 mi (8.0 km)	500 yd (460 m)	One mobile home was blown off its base and tossed across the road. Another mobile home was rolled over, injuring three occupants. Many trees were snapped or uprooted. The National Centers for Environmental Information incorrectly lists this tornado as three separate events.
EF1	Clarksville	Montgomery	TN	36.50°N 87.38°W	04:13	0.29 mi (0.47 km)	50 yd (46 m)	A pavilion was destroyed, telephone poles were snapped, bleachers were damaged, fencing was blown away, and a wooden utility pole was leant at the Montgomery County Fairgrounds.

=== May 3 event ===
List of confirmed tornadoes – Saturday, May 3, 2008
EF#	Location	County / Parish	State	Start Coord.	Time (UTC)	Path length	Max width	Summary
EF1	E of Morgan City	Leflore	MS	33.3743°N 90.3308°W	05:49–05:51	1.29 mi (2.08 km)	300 yd (270 m)	Numerous trees were snapped or uprooted, one of which caused significant damage to a house upon falling.

=== Center Ridge–Damascus–Crossroads, Arkansas ===
Center Ridge–Damascus–Crossroads, Arkansas
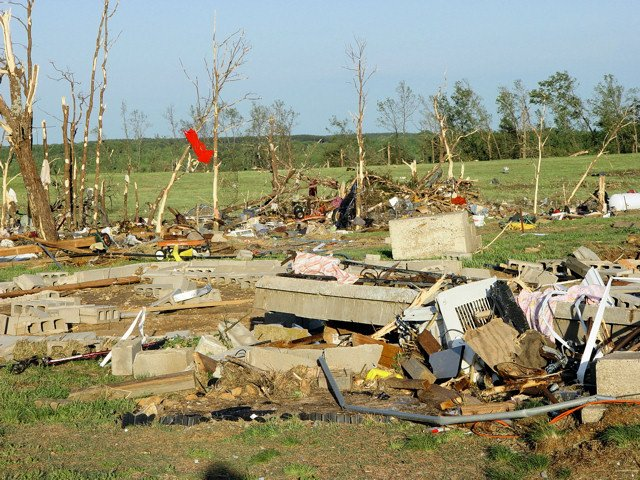
- A home destroyed in Damascus at EF3 intensity

Meteorological history
- Formed: May 2, 2008, 8:15 p.m. CDT
- Dissipated: May 2, 2008, 9:14 p.m. CDT
- Duration: 59 minutes

EF3 tornado
- on the Enhanced Fujita scale
- Highest winds: 136–165 mph (219–266 km/h)

Overall effects
- Casualties: 5 fatalities, 24 injuries
- Damage: $47.00 million (2008 USD)

This long tracked EF3 tornado first touched down south of Center Ridge in Conway County. The tornado rapidly tracked towards the northeast, quickly intensifying, resulting in damage to numerous structures across the eastern side of the county. The tornado would destroy fifteen homes, three chicken houses, kennels, and a minimum of six vehicles. Six outbuildings were destroyed. Another nine houses and five outbuildings sustained major damage. The tornado also caused minor roof damage to several other homes, and produced minor damage to a cemetery, community building, and a ball field. The tornado would end up killing a man and his son on M&M road. The tornado then crossed into Van Buren County, west-southwest of Damascus. This is where the tornado would peak in intensity. The tornado destroyed seventeen permanent homes, and eight mobile homes. Another 30 homes sustained major damage. A four year old girl and her grandaprents were killed when the tornado destroyed their home on Scroggins Creek Road. The tornado would continue into Cleburne County, where it would continue to produce EF2 damage, including major damage, including the complete destruction of 27 houses, and five mobile homes. Another 66 houses sustained major damage, and 96 sustained minor damage. A dog kennel, two chicken houses, and a beauty shop were destroyed. Minor damage was done to two chicken houses, a rock quarry, a flea market, a boat storage facility, a beauty shop, a fire department, a print shop, and a community ball park. The tornado approached and crossed over Greers Ferry Lake, causing 19 boats to sink, and 6,800 homes to lose power. The tornado downed several more power lines along its path before dissipating in the northern side of Cleburne County.

== Impact ==
=== Kansas City area derecho/tornadoes ===
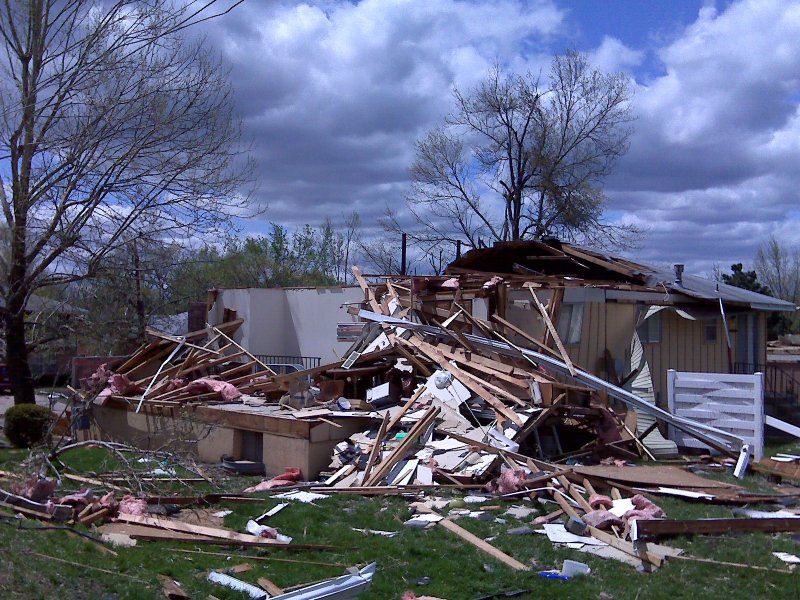
Home heavily damaged in Gladstone, Missouri.

Thunderstorms developed during the late afternoon and early evening of May 1 near Oklahoma City and Kansas City, and produced large hail of up to 3 inches (76 mm) near Midwest City, Oklahoma. There was extensive hail damage throughout Oklahoma County. Ten tornadoes also touched down from these storms in Kansas and Oklahoma.

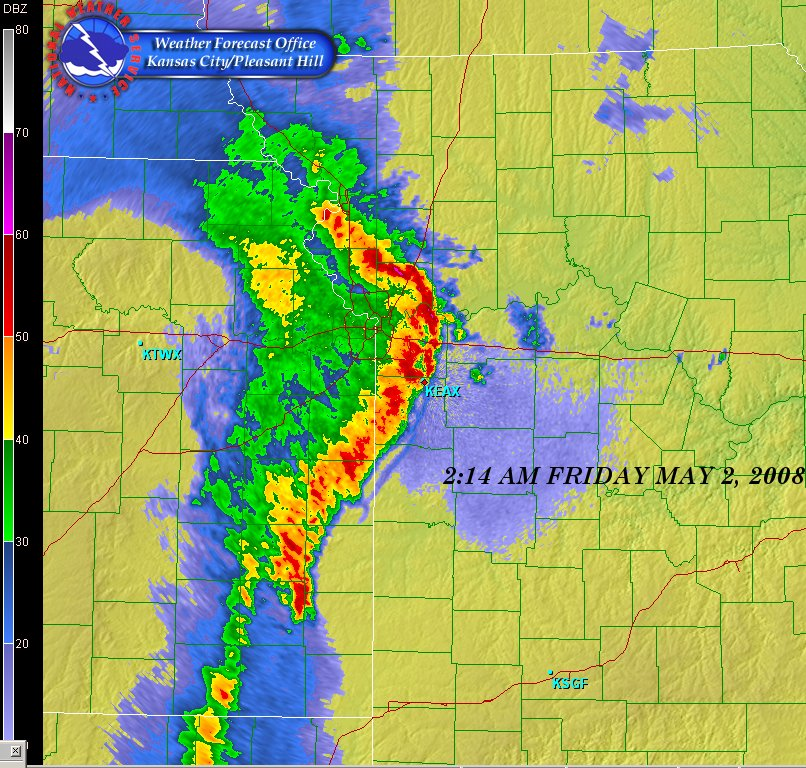
Radar image of the bow echo crossing Kansas City just after 2:00 am CDT

In the overnight hours of May 2, the supercells re-organized into a squall line/serial derecho that moved across the eastern Great Plains. Significant damage was reported across the Kansas City area, particularly in the Gladstone area near 77th Street and Euclid and northwest of Liberty near 108th Street and Cookingham were several homes and businesses were severely damaged or destroyed, including an Arby's restaurant. Several other commercial structures and homes sustained significant damage and railway cars were also overturned. Forty-thousand Kansas City Power & Light customers were left without power. At least three people were injured by the storms in the Kansas City Metro Area. St. Pius X High School and Oak Hill Day School were closed on Friday as a result of the storm.

It was later confirmed that much of the damage was caused by two strong tornadoes that were embedded inside the derecho; an EF2 in Gladstone and an EF3 in Brookridge. According to Kansas City Mayor Mark Funkhouser, over 300 structures were damaged. In Gladstone over 200 buildings were damaged and several were destroyed according to the mayor. Tornadoes also hit Douglas County, Kansas causing locally significant damage. There no reports of fatalities with these storms. It was later reported that despite tornado warnings, many tornado sirens were not sounded in Douglas County and in other parts of the Kansas City Metro.

Five years prior to these tornadoes, areas near Gladstone were hit by an F4 tornado that caused extensive damage while a strong tornado also hit near Liberty during the same outbreak.

=== Arkansas tornadoes ===
At around 8:30 am CDT on May 2, an EF3 tornado touched down north of Little Rock in Conway County, killing two people. The tornado then proceeded into Van Buren County and caused extensive damage to the Damascus area and killed three people. One person was also killed in Benton County by straight-line winds when a tree fell onto the mobile home where she was sleeping. In Pulaski County, another person was killed by a tornado. Some damage was reported to several structures south and east of Little Rock including near Hensley were the fatality was reported.

At around 3:30 pm CDT, a large EF3 tornado hit the town of Earle, Arkansas west of Memphis causing major damage to homes, businesses and the high school, and several people were injured. A supercell to its north also produced a significant tornado in the Etowah area causing extensive damage to several structures including destroyed trailers.

Governor of Arkansas Mike Beebe stated that in Arkansas alone about 350 homes were damaged or destroyed. Seven counties were declared disaster areas including Van Buren, Saline, Pulaski, Cleburne, Conway, Grant and Benton. National Guard were deployed to assist in the cleanup and relief efforts. About 6,000 homes lost power across much of north Arkansas.

== See also ==
- List of North American tornadoes and tornado outbreaks
- Tornado outbreak sequence of May 7–15, 2008
- Tornado outbreak sequence of May 22–31, 2008
