= Earle, Arkansas =

- City
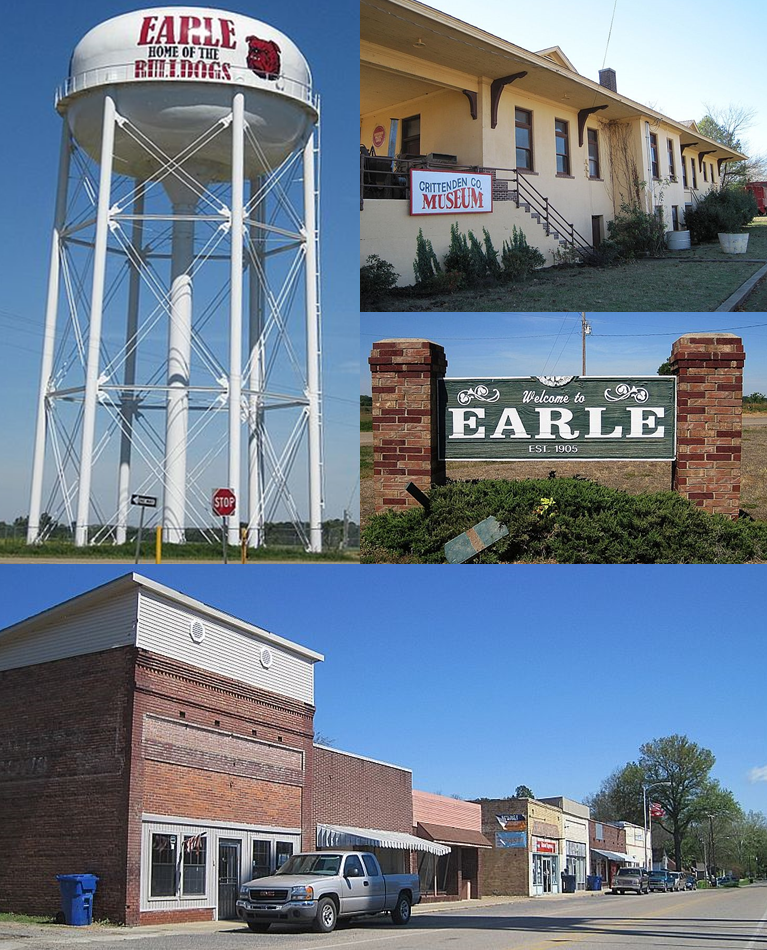
- Clockwise from top: Crittenden County Historical Museum, Earle welcome sign, downtown Earle along US 64B, "Home of the Bulldogs" water tower

- Flag Seal

- Location of Earle in Crittenden County, Arkansas.
- Coordinates: 35°16′24″N 90°27′51″W
- Country: United States
- State: Arkansas
- County: Crittenden
- First settled: 1860's
- Incorporated: March 25, 1905
- Named for: Josiah Francis Earle (1828–1884)

Government
  - Mayor: Jaylen Smith (D)

Area
  - Total: 3.25 sq mi (8.41 km^{2})
  - Land: 3.25 sq mi (8.41 km^{2})
  - Water: 0 sq mi (0.00 km^{2})
- Elevation: 210 ft (64 m)

Population (2020)
  - Total: 1,831
  - Estimate (2025): 1,721 ▼
  - Density: 564/sq mi (217.7/km^{2})
- Time zone: UTC-6 (Central (CST))
  - Summer (DST): UTC-5 (CDT)
- ZIP code: 72331
- Area code: 870
- FIPS code: 05-20320
- GNIS feature ID: 2403528

Earle is a city in Crittenden County, Arkansas, United States. Per the 2020 census, the population was 1,831.

== Geography ==
Earle is located in western Crittenden County. U.S. Route 64 passes through the northern part of the city, bypassing the downtown area. US 64 leads west 19 miles (31 km) to Wynne and 28 miles (45 km) east to Memphis, Tennessee.

Earle has a total area of 3.2 square miles (8.4 km^{2}), all land.

== History ==
=== Early history ===
The city of Earle originally started as two neighboring communities started in the 1860s, Earle and Norvell. Norvell was originally settled in July 1872 by local doctor James Throgmorton. Earle was a train stop established in the late 1880s on land owned by Josiah Francis Earle, a former Confederate soldier and Klansman. The train stop was established after his death in 1884.

=== Reconstruction period ===
In 1888, a branch of the St. Louis, Iron Mountain, & Southern Railway was built south of Earle. The line still exists as a part of the Union Pacific Railroad. The town had two lumber company-owned railroads connect to it in the early 1900s, the Crittenden Railroad and the Tyronza Lumber Company Railroad.

=== Early 20th century ===
Originally, the Earle post office was located within Norvell. The move caused some controversy in the two communities, and in 1904 an altercation took place between the former and then current men who owned the land the post office sat on. John Watt, who formally controlled the post office, shot the current owner, W.M. Brown. Watt was later acquitted of the Brown's murder.

From its formal incorporation in 1905 to the 1940s, Earle was one of the largest towns in Crittenden County. Referred to by locals as the "Pearl of the St. Francis," for many years the town was a center of industry and an important transportation hub for the Arkansas Delta.

One of the more notable residents of Earle was George Berry Washington. Born into slavery in 1864, Washington established a thriving business as a landlord, and through this enterprise provided a means of income for hundreds of Black Arkansans. In 1928, the widow and family of local figure George Berry Washington had a monument, known as "the Angel in the Field", built to honor Washington's life.

In 1918, an African-American man named Elton Mitchell was eviscerated with a knife and hanged from a tree after he refused to work for a white landowner for free.

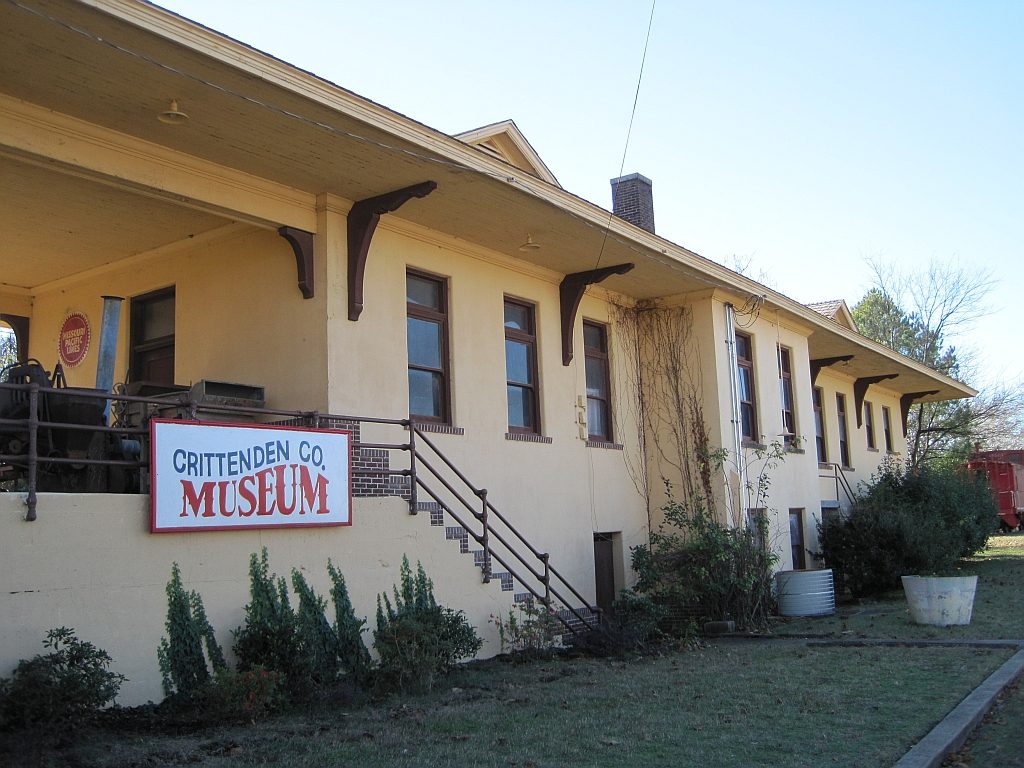
The old Missouri Pacific Depot in Earle. Constructed in 1922, it is listed on the National Register of Historic Places.

=== Modern era ===
A merger of Norvell and Earle was proposed as early as 1913. In 1978, the two towns were formally merged.

==== 2008 tornado ====
On May 2, 2008, WMC-TV reported that a tornado which was reported to be large and very dangerous affected the Earle area causing major damage in parts of the town and some injuries. There were reports of people missing or unaccounted for. Homes were reportedly destroyed, while businesses and the high school were damaged. The tornado was later confirmed on the same day as an EF3 on the Enhanced Fujita Scale with winds near 150 to 160 mph.

The 2022 Earle mayoral election resulted in a historic victory for Jaylen Smith, who at 18 years old became the youngest Black person to be elected mayor in any U.S. city.

== Demographics ==
Historical population
Census	Pop.	Note	%±
1910	1,542		—
1920	2,091		35.6%
1930	2,062		−1.4%
1940	1,872		−9.2%
1950	2,375		26.9%
1960	2,391		0.7%
1970	3,146		31.6%
1980	3,517		11.8%
1990	3,393		−3.5%
2000	3,036		−10.5%
2010	2,414		−20.5%
2020	1,831		−24.2%
2025 (est.)	1,721	▼	−6.0%
U.S. Decennial Census; 2010 2020

=== Racial and ethnic composition ===
Earle city, Arkansas – Racial and ethnic composition Note: the US Census treats Hispanic/Latino as an ethnic category. This table excludes Latinos from the racial categories and assigns them to a separate category. Hispanics/Latinos may be of any race.
Race / Ethnicity (NH = Non-Hispanic)	Pop 2000	Pop 2010	Pop 2020	% 2000	% 2010	% 2020
White alone (NH)	708	396	195	23.32%	16.40%	10.65%
Black or African American alone (NH)	2,275	1,975	1,570	74.93%	81.81%	85.75%
Native American or Alaska Native alone (NH)	6	1	1	0.20%	0.04%	0.05%
Asian alone (NH)	13	9	5	0.43%	0.37%	0.27%
Native Hawaiian or Pacific Islander alone (NH)	0	0	1	0.00%	0.00%	0.05%
Other race alone (NH)	3	0	0	0.10%	0.00%	0.00%
Mixed race or Multiracial (NH)	15	17	32	0.49%	0.70%	1.75%
Hispanic or Latino (any race)	16	16	27	0.53%	0.66%	1.47%
Total	3,036	2,414	1,831	100.00%	100.00%	100.00%

=== 2020 census ===
As of the 2020 census, Earle had a population of 1,831. The median age was 37.2 years. 26.6% of residents were under the age of 18 and 14.9% were 65 years of age or older. For every 100 females, there were 83.1 males, and for every 100 females age 18 and over, there were 80.4 males.

0.0% of residents lived in urban areas, while 100.0% lived in rural areas.

There were 710 households in Earle, and 32.1% had children under the age of 18 living in them. Of all households, 22.0% were married-couple households, 24.1% were households with a male householder and no spouse or partner present, and 47.0% were households with a female householder and no spouse or partner present. About 33.1% of all households were made up of individuals, and 12.4% had someone living alone who was 65 years of age or older.

There were 934 housing units, of which 24.0% were vacant. The homeowner vacancy rate was 2.5%, and the rental vacancy rate was 3.8%.

=== 2000 census ===
In the 2000 census, there were 3,036 people, 1,074 households, and 727 families living in the city. The population density was 932.9 inhabitants per square mile (360.2/km^{2})

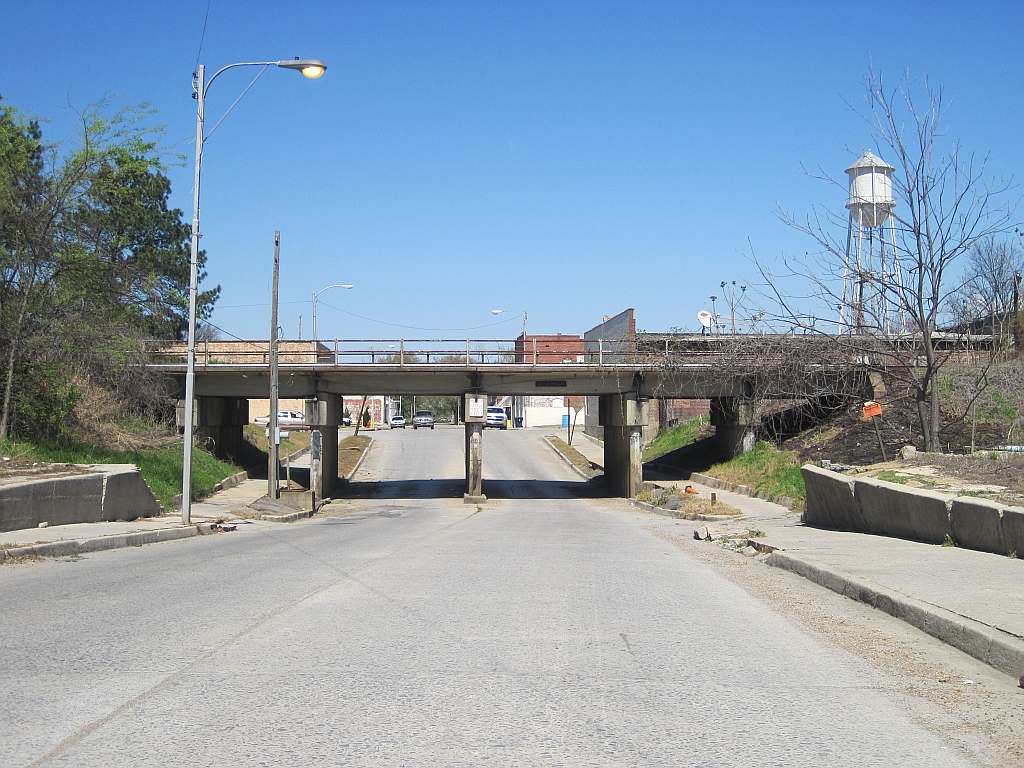
A railroad bridge in Earle, Arkansas

. There were 1,247 housing units at an average density of 383.2 per square mile (148.0/km^{2}). The racial makeup of the city was 23.45% White, 75.23% Black or African American, 0.20% Native American, 0.43% Asian, 0.10% from other races, and 0.59% from two or more races. 0.53% of the population were Hispanic or Latino of any race.

There were 1,074 households, out of which 36.1% had children under the age of 18 living with them, 35.0% were married couples living together, 27.7% had a female householder with no husband present, and 32.3% were non-families. 29.7% of all households were made up of individuals, and 13.5% had someone living alone who was 65 years of age or older. The average household size was 2.83 and the average family size was 3.54.

36.6% of people were under the age of 18. 9.4% were aged from 18 to 24. 24.0% were aged from 25 to 44. 17.0% were aged from 45 to 64. 13.0% were 65 years of age or older. The median age was 29 years. For every 100 females, there were 82.6 males. For every 100 females age 18 and over, there were 74.6 males.

The median income for a household in the city was $20,344. The median income for a family was $22,775. Males had a median income of $26,510 versus $18,011 for females. The per capita income for the city was $13,260. About 40.2% of families and 45.4% of the population were below the poverty line, including 58.7% of those under age 18 and 36.6% of those age 65 or over.

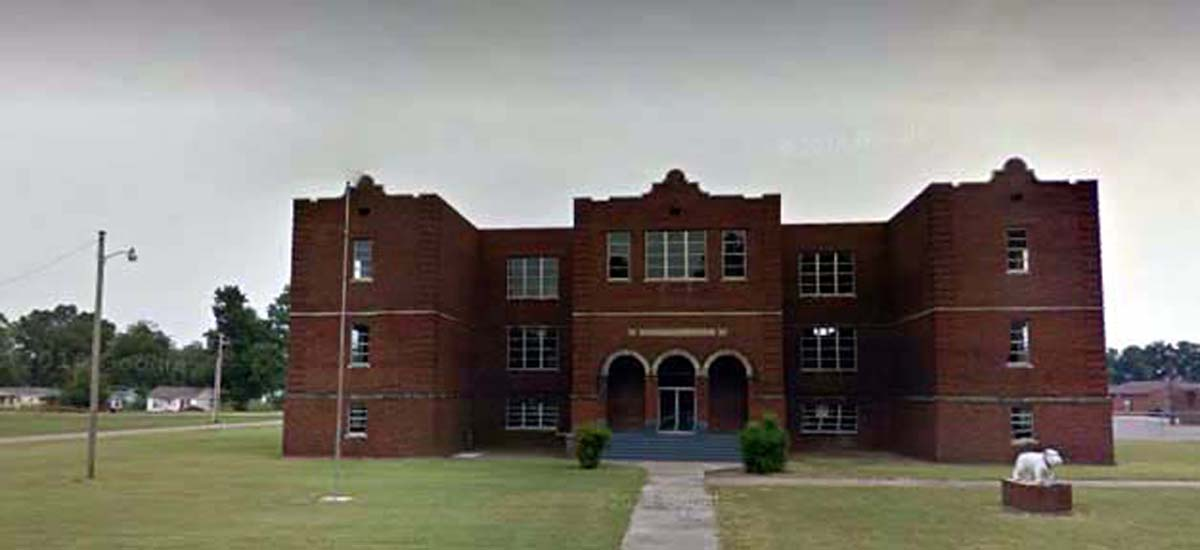
The old Earle High School, listed on the National Register of Historic Places

== Education ==
Public education for early childhood, elementary and secondary school students is primarily provided by the Earle School District, which leads to graduation from Earle High School. The Old Earle High School with its Mission/Spanish Revival style served as the city's high school from 1919 to 1978. It is listed on the National Register of Historic Places.

== Notable people ==
- Charles T. Bernard (1927 – 2015), businessman and Republican politician
- Carroll Cloar (1913 – 1993), surrealist painter and Guggenheim Fellowship recipient.
- Shakey Jake Harris (1921 – 1990), Chicago blues singer, harmonicist and songwriter
- Jaylen Smith (born 2004), Mayor of Earle, youngest Black Mayor in the US and one of the youngest US mayors of any race.
- George Berry Washington (1864 – 1928), a former slave who became one of Crittenden County's largest landowners
- Wilson Douglas Watson (1922 – 1994), recipient of the Congressional Medal of Honor for actions on Iwo Jima
