= Hughes High School =

Location
- 310 College Street; Hughes, Arkansas 72348; United States; 34°57′2″N 90°28′22″W

Information
- School type: Public comprehensive
- Status: Closed
- Closed: July 1, 2015
- School district: Hughes School District
- NCES School ID: 050801000520
- Grades: 7–12
- Enrollment: 169 (2014–15)
- Student to teacher ratio: 8.57
- Education system: ADE Smart Core
- Classes offered: Regular, Advanced Placement (AP)
- Campus type: Rural
- Colors: Royal blue and white
- Athletics conference: 1A 1 West (2012–14)
- Mascot: Blue Devils
- Team name: Hughes Blue Devils
- Accreditation: ADE
- Affiliation: Arkansas Activities Association
- Website: www.school.hsd4.org

Hughes High School (HHS) was an accredited comprehensive public middle and high school located in Hughes, Arkansas, a part of the Hughes School District, until its entire school district was closed due to declining enrollment in 2015. The Hughes High School mascot for academic and athletic teams was the Blue Devil with royal blue and white serving as the school colors.

As the only high school of its district, it served the following places in St. Francis and Crittenden counties: Hughes, Horseshoe Lake, and the St. Francis County section of Jennette.

== History ==
Through the sale of bonds the first school complex was built in the 1920. By 1954, there were two separate campuses one for white students and one for black students. In the 1970's the campuses were integrated.

The Hughes School District was closed due to declining enrollment in 2015. The students were consolidated with the West Memphis School District.

Most middle school-aged students moved to West Junior High School, and most high school students were moved to Academies of West Memphis (formerly West Memphis High School). The West Memphis district took possession of the school buildings and then gave them to the Hughes municipal government in 2016. The high school gymnasium was leased at no cost to the chief of police and Hughes High alumnus Deon Lee, who made it into an after-school centre, spending about $3,000 on cleanup.

== Notable people ==
- Gus Malzahn, head football coach from 1992 to 1994
- Mark R. Martin (1986), Secretary of State of Arkansas since 2011; member of the Arkansas House of Representatives from Washington County from 2005 to 2011; resident of Prairie Grove in Washington County
