= Alice Roberts (disambiguation) =

Alice Roberts (born 1973) is an English academic, TV presenter and author.

Alice Roberts may also refer to:

- Alice Richardson (artist) (fl. 1769–1777), English pastellist who sometimes exhibited under the name Alice Roberts
- Alice Roberts (actress) (1906–1985), Belgian actress
- Caroline Alice Elgar (1848–1920), born C. Alice Roberts, wife of the English composer Edward Elgar
