= Stella Mayhew =

American actress and vaudevillian (1874–1934)

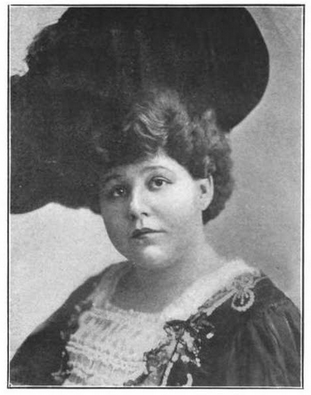
- Mayhew c.1907
- Born: Izetta Estelle Sadler; November 19, 1860; Pittsburgh, Pennsylvania, U.S.
- Died: April 2, 1934 (aged 59); New York City, U.S.
- Occupation: Actress
- Spouse: Billie Taylor (divorced)

Stella Mayhew (born Izetta Estelle Sadler; November 19, 1874 – May 2, 1934) was an American actress and vaudeville performer.

== Early life ==
Stella Mayhew was born Izetta Estelle Sadler in Pittsburgh, Pennsylvania, and began acting as a child in Grafton, Ohio, where her father was a teacher and school principal.

== Career ==
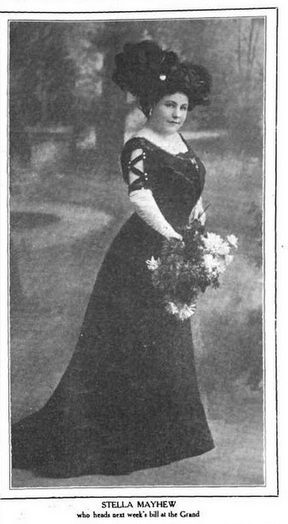
Stella Mayhew, from a 1908 publication.

On the stage, her first major role was in blackface, as "Aunt Lindy" in On the Suwanee River. Mayhew was seen in revues La Belle Paree (1911, again in blackface, with Al Jolson), The Whirl of Society (1912, again in blackface, again with Al Jolson), A World of Pleasure (1915), and in musical comedies including Flo Flo (1904), The Show Girl (1904), The Man from China (1904), Fritz in Tammany Hall (1905), Lifting the Lid (1905), The Whole Damm Family (1905), Comin' Through the Rye (1906), The Jolly Bachelors (1910, again in blackface), Vera Violetta (1911, again with Al Jolson), A Mix-Up (1916), Lace Petticoat (1927), Hit the Deck (1927), Mrs. Bumpstead-Leigh (1929), and Hello Paris (1930).

"Miss Mayhew is not a great vocalist so far as trills are concerned," explained critic Roland Burke Hennessy in 1904. "But when it comes to intelligence, snap, go, and the ability to get out of a song fully three times as much as the author and composer have put into it, Miss Mayhew is to be recommended for any and all occasions." A Los Angeles reviewer commented in 1915 that "Miss Mayhew frolics from wing to wing and from footlights to back-drop in her own Stella Mayhewish fashion and every move and every action is a laugh."

Mayhew appeared in a few short films, including episodes of the serials Our Mutual Girl (1914) and The Hallelujah Lady (1929). She was mentioned as starting her own film production company in 1919. She also made several musical recordings, which have been digitized for a new century's listeners.

After she performed in a 1913 fundraiser for firemen's pension fund, Stella Mayhew was named Third Assistant Chief of the New Rochelle Fire Department. She also sang at a 1910 benefit for the Sanitarium for Poor Children at Rockaway Park.

== Personal life ==
Stella Mayhew married singer and composer Billie Taylor; they divorced in 1922. Mayhew lost her house in Beechhurst, New York, and her life savings, in the stockmarket crash in 1929, and she died "penniless" in 1934, aged 59 years, in the National Vaudeville Artists' Ward at French Hospital, from sepsis after an ankle injury at the Times Square subway station. Mayhew was baptized as a Roman Catholic in her last days, and funeral arrangements were made in that tradition, with funding from the National Variety Artists Association.
