= William J. Wilson =

Scottish theatre director (1874–1936)

William J. Wilson (1874 – March 2, 1936) was a Scottish theatre director, choreographer, stage manager, and stage and film actor active in the United States and the United Kingdom. From 1910-1914 and again from 1925-1927 he worked as a stage director and choreographer for the Shubert family of Broadway producers. He also staged works on London's West End.

== Life and career ==
Born in Scotland in 1874, William J. Wilson made his Broadway debut in 1902 as Lopez in Gustav Luders's King Dodo. He directed his first Broadway production in 1910, a revival of Gilbert and Sullivan's The Mikado, at the Casino Theatre. It was the first of many shows that he would direct for producers and brothers Lee, Sam S., and Jacob J. Shubert over the next four and a half years; some of which he also choreographed. Other works he directed for the Shubert family on Broadway include Up and Down Broadway (1910), La Belle Paree (1911, also as choreographer), Bow-Sing (1911),The Kiss Waltz (1911), The Never Homes (1911), The Duchess (1911), Vera Violetta (1911), The Wedding Trip (1911), The Pirates of Penzance (1912), Under Many Flags (1912), The Dove of Peace (1912), The Man with Three Wives (1913), The Beggar Student (1913), H.M.S. Pinafore (1913 and again in 1914), Iolanthe (1913), All Aboard (1913), America (1913), The Pleasure Seekers (1913), The Whirl of the World (1914), and Wars of the World (1914).

In January 1915, while working on staging a circus production at the New York Hippodrome for the Schuberts, a dispute with J.J. Schubert arose which ended Wilson's employment with the Schubert company along with the employment of the Hippodrome's general director Arthur Voegtlin and musical director Manuel Klein. At the time of the firing, these men were described in The New York Times as " the best-known and highest-salaried men in their branch of the theatrical profession".

After leaving the Schuberts, Wilson staged the 1916 musical The Road to Mandalay, and then did not return to Broadway again for another decade. In 1925 he was once again working for the Schuberts; directing the 1925 musical Mayflowers. This was followed by staging two final productions for the Schubert family, The Wild Rose (1926) and Oh, Ernest! (1927).

Wilson worked briefly as a silent film actor, appearing in the films America (1914) and The Inevitable Penalty (1915).

Wilson also worked as a theatre director and producer in London's West End. In 1921 he directed the UK premiere of the Frank Mandel, Otto Harbach, and Louis Hirsch musical Mary at the Queen's Theatre. In 1925 he directed The Gipsy Princess at the Prince of Wales Theatre. In 1930 he directed the musical revue De La Folie Pure by Noel Scott and Charles Austin at the Victoria Palace Theatre. In 1933 he produced the musical The Only Girl at the Hippodrome, London; a work co-created by Frank Eyton, Clifford Grey, and Herbert C. Sargent with music by Vincent Youmans. In 1934 he directed The Rose of Persia at the Princes Theatre.

Wilson died on March 2, 1936, in Cincinnati, Ohio.

== Bibliography ==
- Amy Asch, ed. (2008). The complete lyrics of Oscar Hammerstein II. Knopf Doubleday Publishing Group. ISBN 9780375413582.
- Richard E. Braff (2002). The Braff Silent Short Film Working Papers: Over 25,000 Films, 1903-1929, Alphabetized and Indexed. McFarland & Company. ISBN 9780786410316.
- Dan Dietz (2021). The Complete Book of 1910s Broadway Musicals. Rowman & Littlefield Publishers. ISBN 9781538150283.
- John Franceschina (2018). "William J. Wilson". Incidental and Dance Music in the American Theatre from 1786 to 1923 Volume 1. BearManor Media.
- Derek B. Scott (2019). German Operetta on Broadway and in the West End, 1900-1940. Cambridge University Press. ISBN 9781108484589.
- J. P. Wearing (2014). The London Stage 1920-1929: A Calendar of Productions, Performers, and Personnel. Rowman & Littlefield Publishers. ISBN 9780810893023.
- J. P. Wearing (2014). The London Stage 1930-1939: A Calendar of Productions, Performers, and Personnel. Rowman & Littlefield Publishers. ISBN 9780810893047.
- Eugene Michael Vazzana (1995). Silent Film Necrology: Births and Deaths of Over 9000 Performers, Directors, Producers, and Other Filmmakers of the Silent Era, Through 1993. McFarland & Company. ISBN 9780786401321.
