= Anthonyville, Arkansas =

- Town
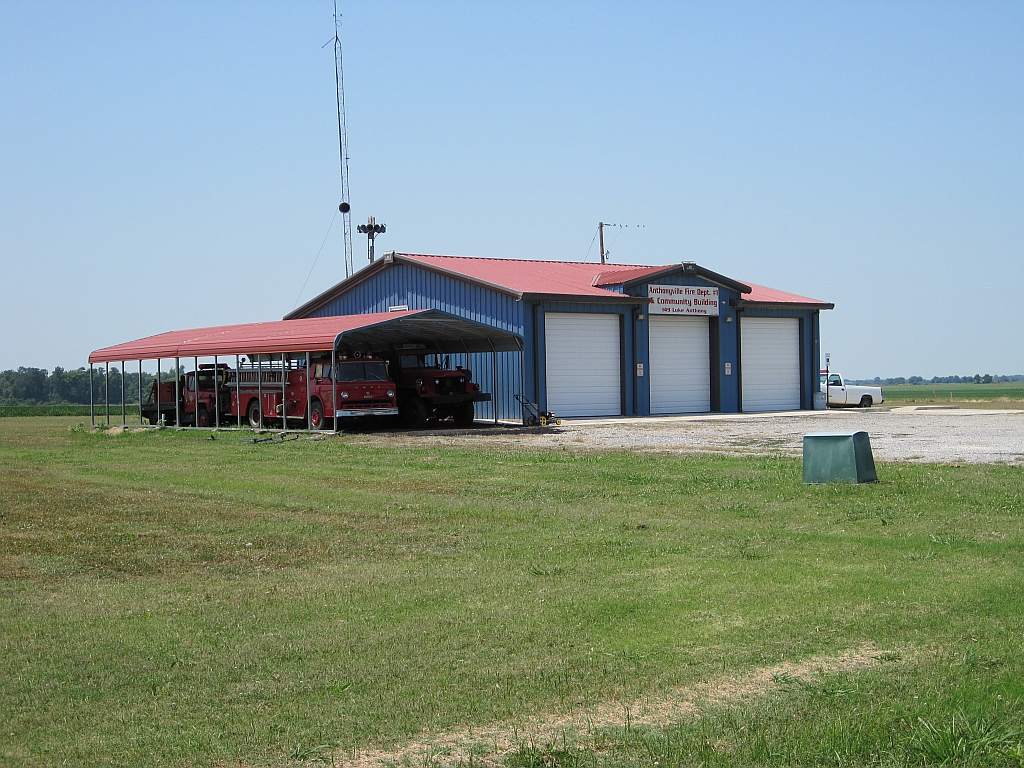
- Community building and fire station

- Location of Anthonyville in Crittenden County, Arkansas.
- Coordinates: 35°02′23″N 90°20′25″W
- Country: United States
- State: Arkansas
- County: Crittenden

Area
  - Total: 0.077 sq mi (0.20 km^{2})
  - Land: 0.077 sq mi (0.20 km^{2})
  - Water: 0 sq mi (0.00 km^{2})
- Elevation: 207 ft (63 m)

Population (2020)
  - Total: 135
  - Estimate (2025): 126 ▼
  - Density: 1,761.1/sq mi (679.95/km^{2})
- Time zone: UTC-6 (Central (CST))
  - Summer (DST): UTC-5 (CDT)
- FIPS code: 05-01457
- GNIS feature ID: 2405155

Anthonyville is a town in Crittenden County, Arkansas, United States. The population was 135 at the 2020 census, down from 161 in 2010 census.

== Geography ==
Anthonyville is located in southern Crittenden County. Arkansas Highway 147 forms the eastern boundary of the town and leads north 9 miles (14 km) to Interstate 40, 15 miles (24 km) west of Memphis, Tennessee. Highway 147 continues south 7 miles (11 km) to the Horseshoe Lake area.

According to the United States Census Bureau, Anthonyville has a total area of 0.12 square miles (0.3 km^{2}), all land.

== Demographics ==
Historical population
Census	Pop.	Note	%±
2000	250		—
2010	161		−35.6%
2020	135		−16.1%
2025 (est.)	126	▼	−6.7%
U.S. Decennial Census

=== 2020 Census ===
Anthonyville town, Arkansas – Racial and ethnic composition Note: the U.S. census treats Hispanic/Latino as an ethnic category. This table excludes Latinos from the racial categories and assigns them to a separate category. Hispanics/Latinos may be of any race.
Race / Ethnicity (NH = Non-Hispanic)	Pop 2000	Pop 2010	Pop 2020	% 2000	% 2010	% 2020
White alone (NH)	7	14	4	2.80%	8.70%	2.96%
Black or African American alone (NH)	241	144	127	96.40%	89.44%	94.07%
Native American or Alaska Native alone (NH)	0	0	0	0.00%	0.00%	0.00%
Asian alone (NH)	0	0	0	0.00%	0.00%	0.00%
Pacific Islander alone (NH)	0	0	0	0.00%	0.00%	0.00%
Other race alone (NH)	0	0	0	0.00%	0.00%	0.00%
Mixed race or Multiracial (NH)	0	3	4	0.00%	1.86%	2.96%
Hispanic or Latino (any race)	2	0	0	0.80%	0.00%	0.00%
Total	250	161	135	100.00%	100.00%	100.00%

As of the census of 2000, there were 250 people, 82 households, and 52 families residing in the town. The population density was 877.5 people/km^{2} (2,273 people/mi^{2}). There were 87 housing units at an average density of 305.4 units/km^{2} (791 units/mi^{2}). The racial makeup of the town was 2.80% White, 96.40% Black or African American, 0.80% from other races. 0.80% of the population were Hispanic or Latino of any race.

There were 82 households, out of which 34.1% had children under the age of 18 living with them, 34.1% were married couples living together, 23.2% had a female householder with no husband present, and 35.4% were non-families. 32.9% of all households were made up of individuals, and 14.6% had someone living alone who was 65 years of age or older. The average household size was 3.05 and the average family size was 4.02.

In the town, the population was spread out, with 38.4% under the age of 18, 6.4% from 18 to 24, 24.4% from 25 to 44, 15.6% from 45 to 64, and 15.2% who were 65 years of age or older. The median age was 31 years. For every 100 females, there were 115.5 males. For every 100 females age 18 and over, there were 108.1 males.

The median income for a household in the town was $23,750, and the median income for a family was $32,344. Males had a median income of $25,357 versus $18,636 for females. The per capita income for the town was $8,825. About 28.4% of families and 32.2% of the population were below the poverty line, including 36.2% of those under the age of eighteen and 48.7% of those 65 or over.

== Education ==
Residents are zoned to schools in the West Memphis School District, which operates Academies of West Memphis (formerly West Memphis High School).
