= Mary (musical) =

1920 musical comedy

Mary (originally titled The house that Jack built) is a 1920 musical comedy with book and lyrics by Frank Mandel and Otto Harbach and music by Louis Hirsch. Among its songs was "Love Nest", Hirsch's most successful, later the theme song for the Burns and Allen radio show.

== Story ==
A young man, Jack Keene, invents a portable house, expecting to make his fortune, but fails in the attempt. He strikes oil accidentally, thereby becoming wealthy, so is able to marry his sweetheart, the "Mary" of the title.

== Productions ==
Mary was originally titled The house that Jack built, and it was only when the musical reached Broadway that its name was changed to Mary (Isn't It A Grand Old Name!); although usually the title is simplified further to Mary. The musical was first performed at the Garrick Theatre in Philadelphia on April 5, 1920. After this, the musical toured the United States prior to reaching the New York stage.

The musical was mounted by producer George M. Cohan on Broadway at the Knickerbocker Theatre where it opened on October 18, 1920. It ran at the Knickerbocker for a total of 220 performances; closing on April 23, 1921. The Broadway production was co-directed by Julian Mitchell and Sam Forrest. It starred Janet Velie as Mary Howells, Jack McGowan as Jack Keene, Frederic Graham as Huggins, James Marlowe as Mr. Goddard, Florrie Millership as Madeline Francis, Georgia Caine as Mrs. Keene, Charles Judels as Gaston Marceau, Helen Kling as Toddling Tessie, Lou Lockett as Two-Step Tom, Si Layman as Whirlwind Willie, and Edna Pierre as Waltzing Winnie.

Mary was staged in London's West End at the Queen's Theatre the following year where it ran for a total of 93 performances from April 27, 1921, through July 9, 1921. The West End production was directed by William J. Wilson and starred Evelyn Laye as Mary Howells, Alec Regan as Jack Keene, Percy Parsons as Huggins, Ambrose Manning as Mr. Goddard, Mabel Sealby as Madeline Francis, Maidie Hope as Mrs. Keene, Margaret Lawrence as Smith, Decima McLean as Toddling Tessie, Guy Magley as Two-step Tom, Bernard Granville as Boyde, Ralph Lynn as Gaston Marceau, Clive Leslie as Deakon, Eddie McLean as Whirlwind Willie, and Maggie Dickinson as Waltzing Winnie.

The first Australian production of ''Mary starred W. S. Percy and Ethel Morrison. It was staged at the Theatre Royal, Adelaide by J. C. Williamson's "Night Out" company on 23 September 1922.
