= Academies of West Memphis =

High school in West Memphis, Arkansas

Location
- 501 West Broadway; West Memphis, Arkansas 72301; United States; 35°8′50″N 90°11′48″W

Information
- Type: Public High School
- School district: West Memphis School District
- NCES School ID: 050804000530
- Principal: Jimmy Sloan
- Teaching staff: 126.60 (FTE)
- Grades: 10–12
- Enrollment: 944 (2023–2024)
- Student to teacher ratio: 7.46
- Campus type: Urban
- Colors: Red and blue
- Mascot: Blue Devil
- Rivals: Marion High School
- Communities served: Most of West Memphis; Anthonyville, Edmondson, Horseshoe Lake, and Hughes; portions of Jennette and Marion
- Website: awm.wmsd.net

Academies of West Memphis (AWM), formerly West Memphis High School, is an accredited comprehensive public high school for students in grades ten through twelve in West Memphis, Arkansas, United States. The school is administered by the West Memphis School District.

As the district's only high school, it serves sections of Crittenden and St. Francis counties, including most of West Memphis, the municipalities of Anthonyville, Edmondson, Horseshoe Lake, and Hughes, and portions of Jennette and Marion.

== History ==
The communities of Hughes and Horseshoe Lake, and the St. Francis County section of Jennette, all previously a part of the Hughes School District, were added to the school's service area when the Hughes district consolidated into the WMSD in 2015. High school-aged Hughes district residents were formerly served by Hughes High School, and after the Hughes closure those students were transferred to AWM.

== Academics and academic performance ==
The assumed course of study for West Memphis students is the Smart Core curriculum, which is the Arkansas' college and career-ready curriculum for high school students developed by the Arkansas Department of Education (ADE). Students complete regular courses and exams and Advanced Placement (AP) coursework and exams that may lead to college credit. West Memphis High School is accredited by AdvancED since 1927. The school's state accreditation with ADE is listed as 'Accredited-Cited' based on its performance since 2008–09 which has led the school to be categorized as a 'State-Directed' school for its Adequate Yearly Progress (AYP) for the No Child Left Behind Act.

== Extracurricular activities ==
The West Memphis High School mascot and athletic emblem is the blue devil with red and blue as its school colors.

=== Athletics ===
The West Memphis Blue Devils compete in the 7A/6A East Conference for the following activities: football, volleyball, competitive cheer, golf (boys/girls), soccer (boys/girls), basketball (boys/girls), baseball, fastpitch softball, and track and field (boys/girls).

==== Basketball ====
The boys basketball team has won six state (classification) championships between 1980 and 2005, including three state (overall) championships between 1980, 1981 and 1991. The 1980 and 1981 teams combined for a state-record 60 consecutive wins.
