= Bernard Granville (disambiguation) =

Bernard Granville (1888–1936) was an American actor, singer and minstrel show performer

Bernard Granville may also refer to:

- Bernard Granville (MP died 1701) (1631–1701), English politician, MP for Liskeard, Saltash, Plymouth and Launceston
- Bernard Granville (MP died 1723) (c. 1670–1723), British politician, MP for Camelford and Fowey
