= Blue Devils =

This disambiguation page is about the plural form. For the singular, see Blue Devil (disambiguation).

Blue Devils may refer to:

== Military history ==
- Blue Devils (aerobatic team), the nickname of the 410 (F) Squadron Aerobatic Team, a Canadian military aerobatic team from 1949 to 1950
- The Fighting Blue Devils, the nickname of the 88th Infantry Division of the United States Army in World War II
- Blue Devils (French: les Diables Bleus), the nickname of the Chasseurs Alpins, the elite mountain infantry of the French Army
- Blue Devils, a reference to the United States Army by the Confederate Army during the Civil War; see List of nicknames of United States Army divisions

== Music ==
- "Blue Devils", a military march by Charles Williams, originally known as "The Kensington March"
- Blue Devils Drum and Bugle Corps, a drum and bugle corps from Concord, California
- Oklahoma City Blue Devils, a territory jazz band based in Oklahoma
- The Last of the Blue Devils, a 1979 documentary of Kansas City jazz

== Sports ==
=== College and professional ===
- Belconnen Blue Devils, a football (soccer) team that formerly played in the New South Wales Premier League (Australia)
- Blue Devils FC, a Canadian semi-professional soccer team
- Central Connecticut Blue Devils, athletic teams from Central Connecticut State University
- Duke Blue Devils, athletic teams from Duke University in Durham, North Carolina
- Hamburg Blue Devils, an American football team that plays in the German Football League
- Fredonia Blue Devils, athletic teams from the State University of New York at Fredonia
- Lawrence Tech Blue Devils, athletic teams from Lawrence Technological University
- UW–Stout Blue Devils, athletic teams from the University of Wisconsin–Stout

=== High school athletic teams in the United States ===
- Booneville High School, Booneville, Mississippi
- Brockport High School, Sweden, New York
- Brunswick High School (Ohio), Brunswick (Cleveland), Ohio
- Celeste High School, Celeste, Texas
- Central High School (Davenport, Iowa)
- Columbia High School (East Greenbush, New York)
- Culpeper County High School, Culpeper, Virginia
- Davis Senior High School (California), Davis, California
- Ellenville High School, Ellenville, New York
- East Aurora High School (New York), East Aurora, New York
- Greencastle-Antrim High School, Greencastle, Pennsylvania
- Grosse Pointe South High School, Grosse Pointe, Michigan
- Huntington High School, Huntington, New York
- Jackson County High School, Gainesboro, Tennessee
- Kenmore West High School, Kenmore, New York
- Lake Fenton High School, Linden, Michigan
- Lebanon High School (Tennessee), Lebanon, Tennessee
- Leominster High School, Leominster, Massachusetts
- Lewiston High School, Lewiston, Maine
- Mortimer Jordan High School, Kimberly, Alabama
- Mt. Lebanon High School, Mt. Lebanon, Pennsylvania
- Oconto High School, Oconto, Wisconsin
- Old Forge Junior-Senior High School, Pennsylvania
- Plainville High School, Plainville, Connecticut
- Coginchaug Regional High School, Regional School District 13, Durham/Middlefield, Connecticut
- Quincy Senior High School, Quincy, Illinois
- Reading High School (Ohio), Reading, Ohio
- Riverland Community College, Austin, Minnesota
- Sedan High School, Sedan, Kansas
- Victor Senior High School, Victor, New York
- Warren Township High School, Gurnee, Illinois
- Westfield High School (New Jersey), Westfield, New Jersey
- West Haven High School, West Haven, Connecticut
- Walla Walla High School, Walla Walla, Washington
- Kennett High School, Kennett Square, Pennsylvania

== Other uses ==
- Blue devils, demons causing depression, according to some the etymology of the blues music genre

== See also ==
- Blue Devil (disambiguation)
- Blue Demons, athletic teams from DePaul University
