= Louis Hirsch =

American composer (1887–1924)

- Born: Louis Achille Hirsch; November 28, 1887; New York City, U.S.
- Died: May 13, 1924 (aged 36); New York City, U.S.
- Education: City College of New York; Stern Conservatory
- Occupations: Composer; lyricist
- Years active: 1906–1924
- Style: Musical theatre

Louis Achille Hirsch (November 28, 1887 – May 13, 1924), also credited as Louis A. Hirsch or Lou Hirsch, was an American composer musical theatre and popular music in the early 20th century.

== Life and career ==
Hirsch was born in New York City. In his senior year at the City College of New York, he traveled to Europe to study piano at Berlin's Stern Conservatory, with pianist Rafael Joseffy. He returned to the U.S. in 1906 and began working as a staff pianist in the Tin Pan Alley publishing houses of Gus Edwards, and Shapiro-Bernstein. He also began to write some of his own music.

Hirsch's first assignment was writing music for the Lew Dockstader's Minstrels. Soon, some of his melodies were interpolated into Broadway shows, including The Gay White Way, Miss Innocence (starring Anna Held), and The Girl and the Wizard. In 1910, He Came from Milwaukee was Hirsch's first full score. His Revue of Revues (1911) introduced the French star Gaby Deslys to America. He subsequently wrote the music to many songs that Deslys made popular, including "The Gaby Glide", "Come Dance with Me", and "When You Hear Love's Hello". One of his most popular jazz tunes is "It's Getting Very Dark on Old Broadway". His first major success was Vera Violetta (1911), which made Al Jolson a star. For the Shubert family, in 1912 and 1913, he contributed music to The Whirl of Society and The Passing Show (both starring José Collins).

Hirsch was one of the nine founders of ASCAP in 1914 and was an ASCAP director between 1917 and 1924. During World War I, he contributed songs to four editions of the Ziegfeld Follies, including "Sweet Kentucky Lady" and "Hello Frisco!". He wrote music for the 1918 musical Oh, My Dear! and collaborated with Otto Harbach as lyricist on the musicals Going Up (1917) and Mary (1920), including "Love Nest", his most successful song, which later became the Burns and Allen radio show theme. He also wrote music for The Rainbow Girl and See Saw, among others. Hirsch also conceived many of the storylines and concepts in his musicals. In 1921, he contributed to the Broadway show The O'Brien Girl and then the 1922 and 1923 editions of The Greenwich Village Follies.

Other popular Hirsch songs include "Neath the Southern Moon" (also titled "'Neath the South Sea Moon"), "The Tickle Toe", "Always Together", "Garden of Your Dreams", "Hold Me in Your Loving Arms", "Going Up", "My Sumurum Girl", "Mary", "Love Is Like a Red Red Rose", "When I Found You", "Beautiful Island of Girls", "My Rambler Rose", "The Love Nest", "I Am Thinking of You", and "Annabel Lee".

On May 27, 1920, Hirsch sued the New York Yankees for $100‚000 because of an incident at the Yankee game at the Polo Grounds on the 24th. To avoid sitting next to a cigar smoker‚ Hirsch switched seats with his brother. An usher informed him it was against the rules to shift seats and ordered the two brothers to switch back. Hirsch refused and was forcibly ejected from the stands.

Hirsch died of pneumonia in New York City, aged 36.

== Musicals ==
- He Came from Milwaukee (1910); music also by Ben Jerome
- He Came from New York (1911)
- The Revue of Revues (1911)
- Vera Violetta (1911); music also by Edmund Eysler, George M. Cohan, and Jean Schwartz
- The Whirl of Society (1912)
- The Passing Show of 1912 (1912)
- Hullo, Ragtime! (1912)
- Hullo, Tango! (1913)
- Honeymoon Express (1914)
- Dora's Doze (1914)
- Ziegfeld Follies of 1915 (1915)
- Ziegfeld Follies of 1916 (1916); music also by Jerome Kern and Dave Stamper
- The Grass Widow (1917)
- Going Up (1917)
- The Rainbow Girl (1918)
- Ziegfeld Follies of 1918 (1918)
- Oh, My Dear! (1918)
- See-Saw (1919)
- Mary (1920)
- The O'Brian Girl (1921)
- The Greenwich Village Follies (1922)
- Ziegfeld Follies of 1922 (1922); music also by Dave Stamper
- The Greenwich Village Follies (1923)
- Betty Lee (1924); music also by Con Conrad
