= The Whirl of Society =

1912 Broadway musical

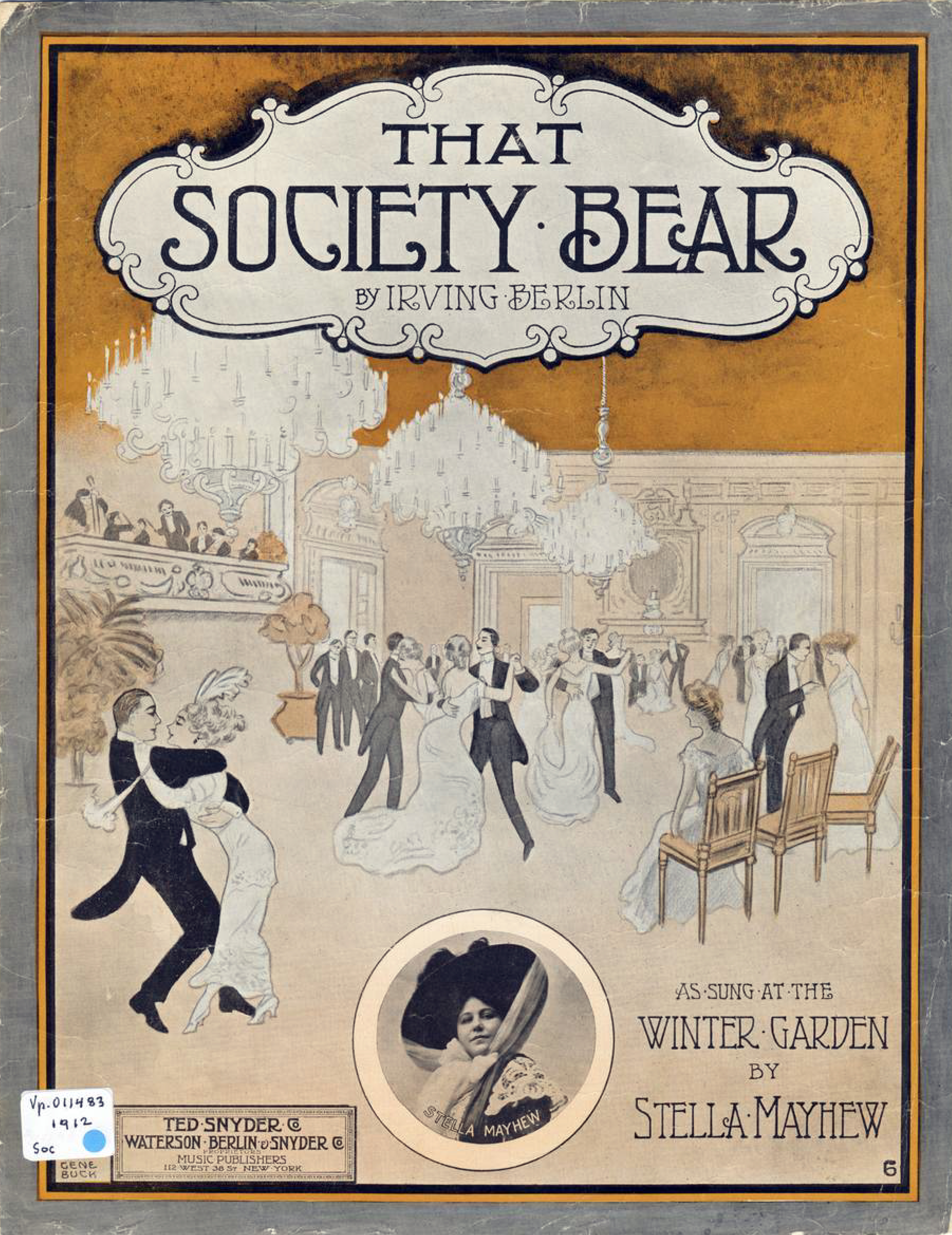
Sheet music for Irving Berlin's "(That) Society Bear", performed by Stella Mayhew

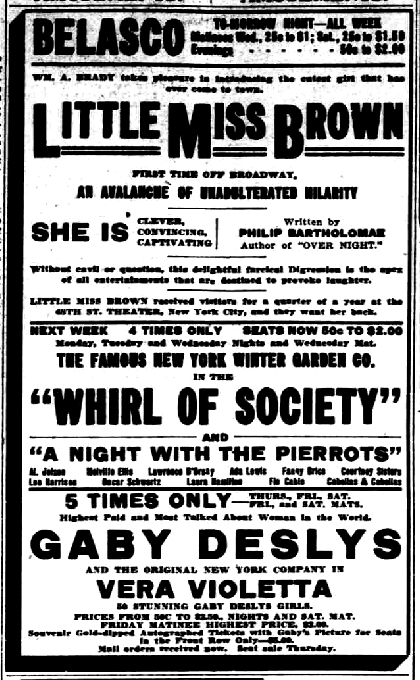
Newspaper ad for the show, while playing in Washington DC.

The Whirl of Society was a satirical Broadway musical that played at the Winter Garden Theatre from March 5 to June 29, 1912. Louis Hirsch composed the music with lyrics by Harold Atteridge, to a book by Harrison Rhodes. The production also featured songs by Arthur Fields. The Whirl of Society was part of a production also featuring Sesostra and A Night with the Pierrots, for 136 productions. The musical is set in New York City and takes place in the drawing room and ball room of Mrs. Dean (portrayed by Stella Mayhew in the original production).

The production also toured the country. It was performed with A Night with the Pierrots in Washington DC in November 1912.

Fanny Brice was in the musical in 1912, when it was listed as a Shubert production. It also featured Al Jolson, one of five musicals he was in with the Shubert empire, in which "the producers recognized his escalating value to their business empire".

== Featured songs ==
The Whirl of Society featured songs including "Waiting for the Robert E. Lee", "Row, Row, Row" and "Snap Your Fingers", performed by Al Jolson, and Irving Berlin's "Society Bear", sung by Stella Mayhew. “A Night With The Pierrots” had a hit song, “My Sumurun Girl“ sung by Jolson.
