= West Memphis School District =

School district in Arkansas

Location
- West Memphis, Arkansas United States

District information
- Grades: PK–12
- Schools: 12
- NCES District ID: 0500840

Students and staff
- Students: 5,789
- Teachers: 398.34 (on FTE basis)
- Student–teacher ratio: 14.53

Other information
- Website: www.wmsd.net

West Memphis School District is a public school district that is headquartered in West Memphis, Arkansas, United States, covering sections of Crittenden and St. Francis counties. It serves most of West Memphis, the municipalities of Anthonyville, Edmondson, Horseshoe Lake, and Hughes, and portions of Jennette and Marion.

== History ==
In 2005 the school district changed its attendance boundaries to more evenly distribute elementary school students. This meant that school bus routes for shorter time frames and expenses opened.

Bill Kessinger, superintendent as of 2011, had been in that job since circa the 1980s. He opposed the creation of charter schools in his district.

On April 9, 2015, due to the low number of students in the Hughes School District, the Arkansas Board of Education voted to consolidate the Hughes district into the West Memphis district 7-1.

== Demographics ==
Circa 2004 the district had about 6,200 students. In 2011 this was down to 5,700, a decline by about 8%. In the 2010-2011 school year, 100 African-American students left the school district. A 2011 Arkansas Legislature report stated that West Memphis district officials did not know the reason behind the enrollment declines.

== Student achievement ==
In 2008 the State of Arkansas had labeled one of its schools as needing improvement for six years, another for five, and at four others for at least one year. By 2010 West Memphis High School was about to improve its status and only three others also had that needing improvement status.

== Schools ==
High schools:

- Academies of West Memphis High School, 10-12
  - The Academies of West Memphis High School was the first conversion charter high school in Arkansas to partner with a community college in providing academic, career, and technical education. AWM was approved by the Arkansas State Board of Education in January 2014

Junior high schools:

- West Junior High School, 7-9
  - Most Hughes junior high-aged students post-2015 were transferred to West Junior High School. In 2015, the State of Arkansas ranked the school a "C" under state accountability ratings.
- Wonder Junior High School, 7-9

Elementary schools:

- Bragg Elementary School, K-6
- Faulk Elementary School, K-6
  - From 2005 to 2011 it was the West Memphis elementary school that had the second steepest decline in the number of students. Most Hughes elementary-aged students post-2015 were transferred to Faulk Elementary. In 2015, the State of Arkansas ranked the school a "D" under state accountability ratings. The 2011 legislature report stated that it consistently had issues with "school improvement".
- Maddux Elementary School, K-6
- Richland Elementary School, K-6
  - From 2005 to 2011 its enrollment increased. In 2011 79% of its students were white. In the state test scores, 96.2% of the students achieved at least proficiency in mathematics while 93.3% did the same with mathematics. The 2011 legislature report called it "high achieving", and "one of the highest achieving schools" in Arkansas. In 2011, Richland Elementary received top honors from the U.S. Department of Education (ED) in being named a National Blue Ribbon School.
- Weaver Elementary School, K-6
  - The 2011 legislature report stated that it consistently had issues with "school improvement".
- Jackson-Wonder Elementary School, K-6
  - It is located in the former high school facility. Its enrollment declined due to a 2005 change in school bus routes and the establishment of a low income housing unit, in another attendance zone, that took students previously zoned to Wonder Elementary. In 2005 it had 682 students. In 2011 it had 560 students, with 97% eligible for school meals at a reduced cost or no cost, and 99% of the students were African-American. From 2005 to 2011 it was the West Memphis elementary school that had the steepest decline in the number of students. The 2011 legislature report stated that it consistently had issues with "school improvement". The same report stated that multiple parents of Wonder Elementary students were alumni of Wonder Elementary and that they "feel a strong connection with the school and are not interested in their children attending another school just because it has higher test scores."

== Transportation ==
Typically school bus commute times from Hughes to West Memphis are about one hour each way due to the bus making multiple stops; without stops the commute would take about thirty minutes. In winter periods Hughes students depart from school and/or arrive from home when the sun is not out.
