= The Merry Widower =

1929 film

- Harry Liedtke and La Jana
- Directed by: Robert Land
- Written by: Walter Reisch; Franz Schulz
- Starring: Harry Liedtke; La Jana; Alice Roberts
- Cinematography: Carl Drews; Gotthardt Wolf
- Music by: Franz Lehár
- Production company: Super-Film
- Distributed by: Deutsche Lichtspiel-Syndikat
- Release date: 1 May 1929
- Running time: 102 minutes
- Country: Germany
- Language: German

The Merry Widower (German: Der lustige Witwer) is a 1929 German comedy film directed by Robert Land and starring Harry Liedtke, La Jana, Alice Roberts. The film's sets were designed by Robert Neppach.

It is not to be confused with the 1908 show at the Pekin Theatre in Chicago starring Lottie Grady and Jerry Mills.

== Cast ==
- Harry Liedtke as George Dulac
- La Jana as Lucile Daumier
- Alice Roberts as Alice Dulac
- Marcel Vibert as William Garrick - ein Witwer
- Anton Pointner as Ein Paradegast
- Otto Wallburg as Ein Paradegast
- John Mylong as Ein Paradegast
- Károly Huszár as Der Hoteldirektor
- Hanna Waag as Die Hotelsekretärin

== Bibliography ==
- Bock, Hans-Michael & Bergfelder, Tim. The Concise Cinegraph: Encyclopaedia of German Cinema. Berghahn Books, 2009.
