= Vera Violetta =

Operetta

Vera Violetta is an operetta including a libretto by Louis Stein and music by Edmund Eysler, additional music by George M. Cohan, Jean Schwartz and Louis A. Hirsch. Set in Paris, the work is about the flirtatious wife of a professor. Vera Violetta was the name both of her Roger & Gallet perfume and a waltz which celebrated it.

This was adapted by Harold Atteridge and Leonard Liebling for Shuberts' Winter Garden Theatre on Broadway. A variety of star turns were added including "The Gaby Glide" for celebrated dancer Gaby Deslys and her partner Harry Pilcer; and "Ta-Ra-Ra-Boom-Der-E" for José Collins – the song which had been popularised by her mother, Lottie Collins. Al Jolson had a supporting role as a blackface waiter but stole the show with his performances of "Rum-Tum-Tiddle" and "That Haunting Melody" which had regular encores. Another rising star who appeared in the show was the young Mae West. The production was directed by William J. Wilson.

The programme was preceded by some vaudeville and then closed with Undine – a special performance by swimmer Annette Kellerman. The show opened on 20 November 1911 and ran for 112 performances.
