= Distress (1929 film) =

1929 film

- Directed by: Jean Durand
- Written by: Jean Durand
- Starring: Philippe Hériat; Alice Roberts; Harry Pilcer
- Release date: 1929
- Country: France
- Languages: Silent; French intertitles

Distress (French: Détresse) is a 1929 French silent film directed by Jean Durand.

== Cast ==
- Philippe Hériat
- Maurice Luguet
- Harry Pilcer
- Alice Roberts

== Bibliography ==
- Rège, Philippe. Encyclopedia of French Film Directors, Volume 1. Scarecrow Press, 2009.
