= The Whirl of the World =

The Whirl of the World is a musical revue in two acts with music by Sigmund Romberg and both book and lyrics by Harold Atteridge. The work also contained some additional songs by Harry Gifford and Fred Godfrey. The musical premiered on Broadway at the Winter Garden Theatre on January 10, 1914. It closed on May 30, 1914, after 161 performances. Produced by brothers Lee and Jacob J. Shubert, the production was staged by William J. Wilson and used costumes designed by Melville Ellis.

The loose plot of the revue centers around the young American Jack Phillips who has audaciously gained admittance into the exclusive Amber Club under an assumed identity. Jack makes a wager with the Marquis Tullyrand that he can get thirty girls in thirty days to write her name and pledge devotion to him in his little red book. The marquis attempts to get Jack to lose through various tricks; including revealing the nature of the wager to Fifi. On hearing the news, Fifi vows never to sign her name in Jack's book, and her hold out means he is one girl short of winning the bet. Eventually, Jack wins her over and she signs; winning his wager with the marquis.

== Original cast ==
- Bernard Granville as Jack Phillips
- Ralph C. Herz as Marquis Tullyrand
- Lillian Lorraine as Fifi & Cleopatra II
- George Moon as Jacques Ahmed
- Willie Howard as Sammy Meyers
- Eugene Howard as Steward of the Amber Club; Captain of "La France"; Purser of "La France; and The Mysterious Arabian
- Rozsika Dolly as Olivia
- Lawrence Ward as Archie Piccadilly
- Robert Ward as Bertie Strand
- Harry Delf as Pierre
- Lawrence Grant as General Pavlo
- Walter C. Kelly as the Virginia Judge
- Arthur Welsley as Claudie
- Juliette Lippe as Nanette
- Liana Lorelli as Adele
- Lillian Howell as Lorette
- June Eldridge as Elise
- Trixie Raymond as Annette
- Elita Sherman as Marguerite
- Lester Sheehan as Francois
- Jean Leprince as the Footman
- Felix Patty as a Gendarme
- Earle Talbot as the Captain of Police
- George Hanlon as the Seargent of Police
