= Infatuation (1918 film) =

1918 French film

Infatuation (Bouclette)
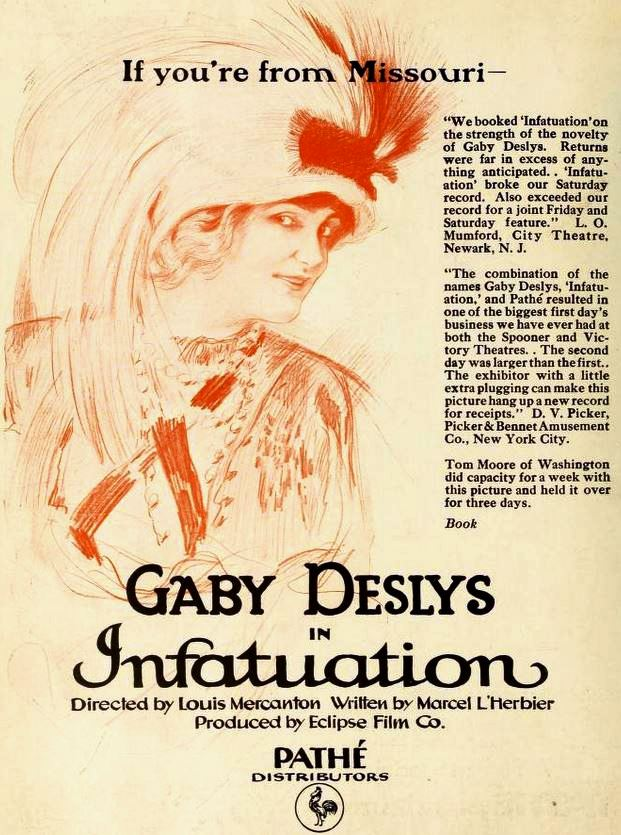
- Advertisement for the American release
- Directed by: René Hervil; Louis Mercanton
- Written by: Marcel L'Herbier
- Produced by: Eclipse Film Company
- Starring: Gaby Deslys; Harry Pilcer
- Distributed by: Pathé Exchange (USA)
- Release dates: December 23, 1918 (France); August 16, 1920 (Portugal); December 17, 1921 (Hungary)
- Country: France
- Language: French

Infatuation is a 1918 French silent film directed by René Hervil and Louis Mercanton. It starred dancer Gaby Deslys. The film had releases in Portugal and Hungary as well as the United States. Its original title in French was Bouclette.

== Cast ==
- Gaby Deslys as Flora Hys
- Harry Pilcer as Gray Stanton
- Gabriel Signoret as Henri Le Baron
- Marcel L'Herbier as Paul Bernard
- Max Maxudian as Brulard (*uncredited)
