= Her Triumph =

1915 film

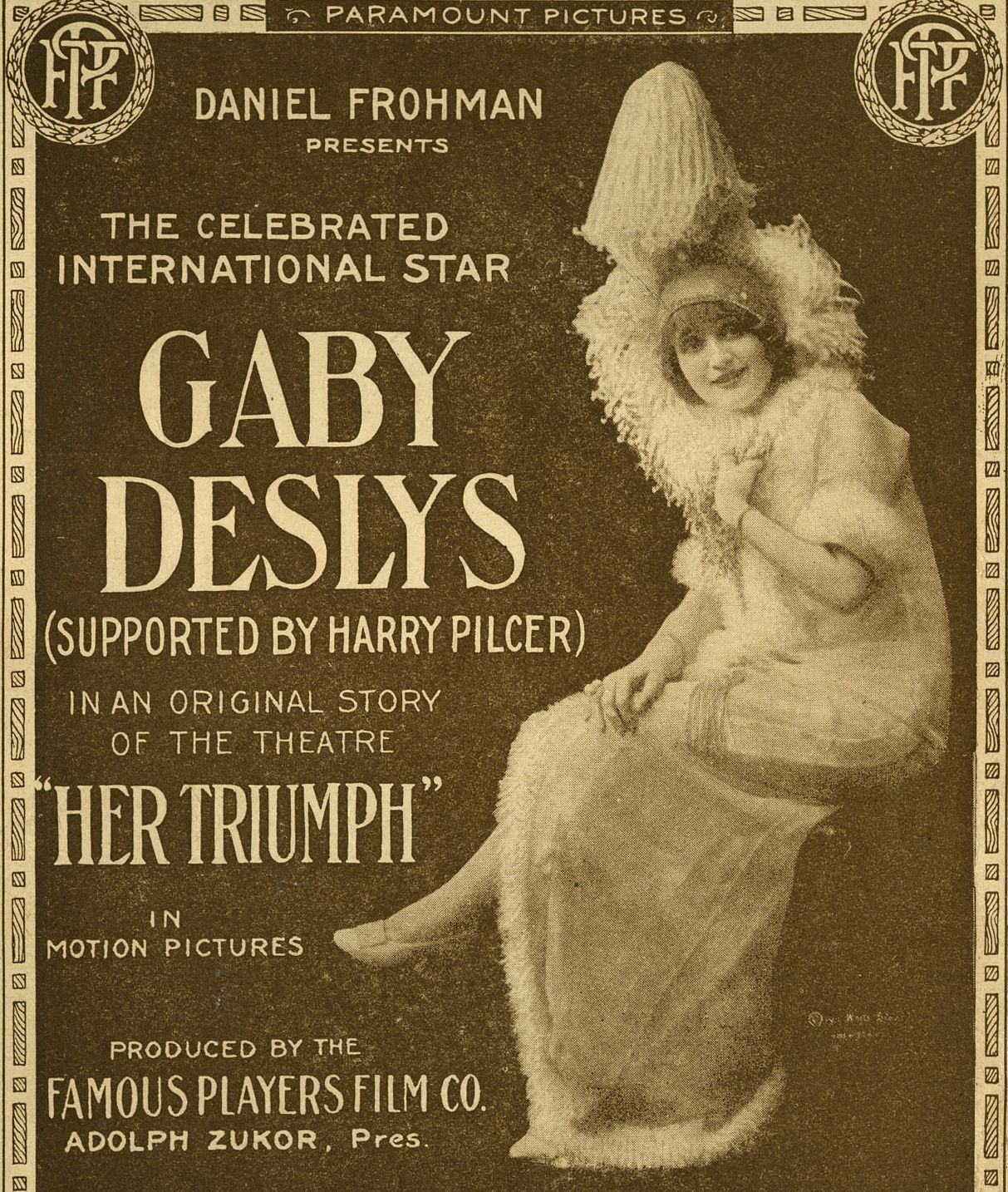
- Lobby poster
- Produced by: Daniel Frohman; Adolph Zukor
- Starring: Gaby Deslys
- Production company: Famous Players Film Company
- Distributed by: Paramount Pictures
- Release date: February 15, 1915 (United States)
- Country: United States
- Languages: Silent; English intertitles

Her Triumph is a 1915 American silent drama film starring French dancer and actress Gaby Deslys, distributed by Paramount Pictures. The film was financed by the American film company Famous Players and shot in Paris. Her Triumph is now considered lost. A fragment has been discovered, and was shown at the Cinema Museum, London in April 2024.

== Production ==
Her Triumph was Deslys' first American feature film, and was a dramatic retelling of her career. Her dancing partner Harry Pilcer co-stars in the film. Daniel Frohman produced and was Gaby Deslys' American stage manager.

== Cast ==
- Gaby Deslys - Gaby
- Harry Pilcer - Claude Devereux
