= Blue Devil =

Blue Devil may refer to:

- Blue Devil (DC Comics), comic character
- Blue Devil (blimp), American intelligence-gathering blimp under development in 2011
- Blue Devil (mascot), the mascot of the Duke University athletic teams
- Blue Devil (bombsight), a post-war version of the Mark XIV bomb sight
- The Little Blue Devil, a 1919 play by Harold Atteridge and Harry Carroll
- Paraplesiops, a genus of fishes, commonly called "blue devil"
- Echium vulgare, a European plant naturalized in North America and commonly known as "blue devil"
- Eryngium ovinum, an Australian plant commonly known as "blue devil"
- Eryngium pinnatifidum, another plant from Western Australia, also known as "blue devil"
- Chevrolet Corvette (C6), the blue colour of Corvette ZR1 (2008-2013), commonly called "blue devil"
