= An Ideal Woman =

1929 film

- Directed by: Jean Durand
- Written by: Jean Durand
- Starring: Arlette Marchal; Charles Vanel; Alice Roberts
- Release date: 5 July 1929
- Country: France
- Languages: Silent; French intertitles

An Ideal Woman (1929)

An Ideal Woman (French: La femme rêvée) is a 1929 French silent film directed by Jean Durand and starring Arlette Marchal, Charles Vanel, and Alice Roberts.

== Cast ==
- Arlette Marchal
- Charles Vanel
- Alice Roberts
- Harry Pilcer
- Tony D'Algy
- Thérèse Kolb
- Jeanne Grumbach

== Bibliography ==
- Rège, Philippe. Encyclopedia of French Film Directors, Volume 1. Scarecrow Press, 2009.
