= Gaby Deslys =

French singer and actress (1881–1920)

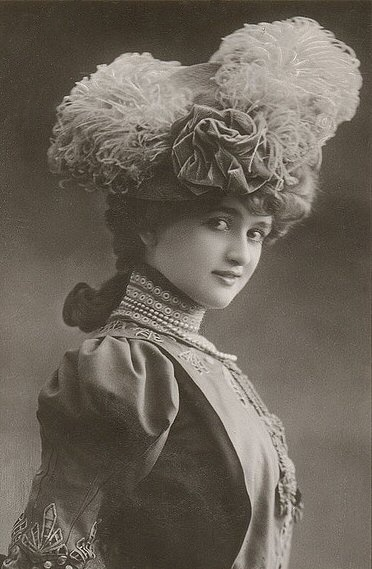
- Publicity photo of Deslys, c. 1910s
- Born: Marie-Elise-Gabrielle Caire; 4 November 1881; Marseille, French Third Republic
- Died: 11 February 1920 (aged 38); Rue Antoine-Chantin, Paris
- Occupations: Actress, singer, dancer
- Years active: c. 1901–1919

Gaby Deslys (born Marie-Elise-Gabrielle Caire, 4 November 1881 – 11 February 1920) was a French singer and actress during the early 20th century. She selected her name for her stage career, and it is a contraction of Gabrielle of the Lillies. During the 1910s she was exceedingly popular worldwide, making $4,000 a week in the United States alone ($138,214 in 2025 dollars). She performed several times on Broadway, at the Winter Garden Theater, and performed in a show with a young Al Jolson. Her dancing was so popular that The Gaby Glide was named for her.

Renowned for her beauty, she was courted by several wealthy gentlemen including King Manuel II of Portugal. She eventually made the leap to silent films, making her only U.S. film Her Triumph with Famous Players–Lasky in 1915. She would make a handful of films in France before her death. In 1919 she contracted Spanish influenza and underwent several operations trying to cure a throat infection caused by the disease. She died from complications of the infection in Paris in 1920, at the age of 38.

== Early life ==
Deslys had many admirers among royalty, most notably King Manuel II of Portugal, and her origins became the subject of dispute. A private detective claimed her true name was Hadiwga Nawrati or Hedvika Navrátilová and that she was a Czech peasant girl, born in the village of Horní Moštěnice, then part of Austria-Hungary. The investigator reported that Deslys had denied her alleged mother's claim to kinship when he brought her to see the dancer, paying her a large amount of money to leave. Deslys replied that the story was ridiculous and that she was French, not Czech.

After Deslys' death, at least two dozen persons with the surnames Navratil/Navratilová attempted to claim her fortune. In January 1930, the French foreign minister said he had settled the dispute about Deslys' birthplace and origins. According to him, Deslys had been born in Marseille on 4 November 1881 (despite some sources claiming her birth year was 1884), daughter of Hippolyte Caire and his wife, Mathilde (née Terras). This study found that the claim of the Navrátil family was incorrect and was based on their daughter's being a look-alike of Gabrielle Caire, who later adopted the stage name Gaby Deslys.

== Career ==
=== Dancer ===
Deslys rose in popularity in dance halls around Paris and London. She was a practitioner of several types of dance such as the Ju-Jitsu waltz, Ballroom, Grizzly Bear, Turkey Trot and her most famous The Gaby Glide. Her appearance at the Liverpool Olympia was also well received. She had been to the United States where she had earned $4,000 per week. She was dedicated to the art of dancing. At least a part of her popularity was a result of her desire to please the audiences who came to watch her perform.

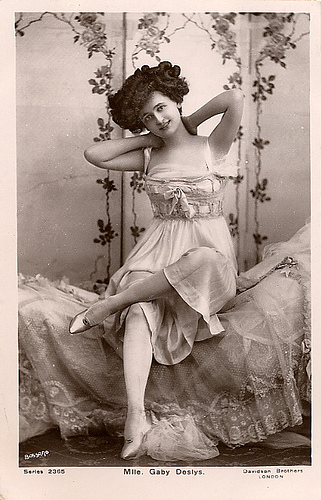
Still photo of Deslys

In 1906 The Tatler featured a full-page portrait of "The famous Parisian actress who takes an important part in The New Aladdin, to be produced at the Gaiety Theatre on Saturday next [29 September]". She sang "very cleverly in an ultra-modern French manner".

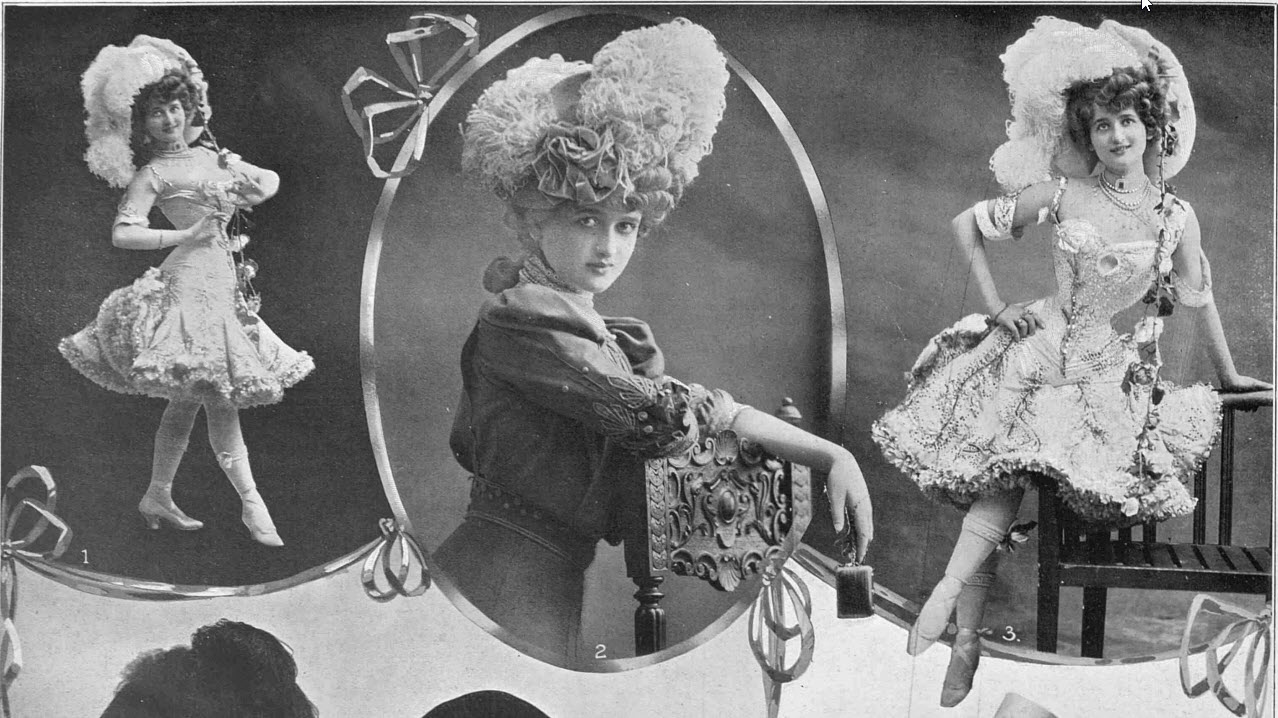
Gaby Deslys as "The Charm of Paris" in "The New Aladdin" in 1906

While she was dancing at the Hyperion Theater at Yale University, in November 1911, students rushed the stage. The Yale News had complained about ticket prices for the production being raised to $2. The performance followed the Yale - Princeton University football game played earlier the same day. The inflated price of admission is thought to have triggered the students to pull the seats to pieces and proceed with the outbreak. Deslys retreated to her room while stage hands used fire extinguishers to subdue the students. The same month Deslys performed at the Winter Garden Theater in a production of Vera Violetta. In 1913 Deslys appeared with Al Jolson (in blackface) in the musical comedy The Honeymoon Express.

On a number of occasions she appeared at the Grand Casino in Marseille. Her final performance there was in 1919. Her passion for Marseille was matched by her animosity toward her critics among French editors. One of her most prominent detractors was Ernest Charles. She sued him for 50,000 francs in August 1912. She at first considered hiring a groom to horsewhip Charles before her lawyer advised against it.

During the early decades of the last century, her likeness adorned many cigarette trading cards issued in the United States and United Kingdom that were dedicated to series on ‘beauties’ or famous actresses and dancers.

=== Singer ===
In 1910 Deslys recorded two songs in Paris, "Tout en Rose" and "Philomène". Both were released on phonograph by His Master's Voice and are still available. Another song, "La Parisienne" was recorded at the same time but rejected for an unknown reason, and thus never released.

=== Films ===
She began her movie career in 1914 with Rosy Rapture, a short film based on the play of the same name in which she had appeared in England. This film according to IMDb had a scene with George Bernard Shaw in it. Her American feature film debut came in 1915 with Her Triumph costarring her dancer boyfriend Harry Pilcer. The film was presented by Daniel Frohman and produced by Famous Players–Lasky. Her Triumph featured Deslys doing one of her famous dances with Pilcer. The film is lost but surviving stills show a scene with Deslys and Pilcer in Daniel Blum's Pictorial History of the Silent Film, as well as the intro card with Deslys' picture in the credits. She made only two more French silent films in 1918 and 1919, both with Harry Pilcer in the cast, before getting the illness that would take her life.

== Personal life ==
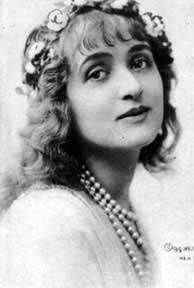
Still of Deslys c. 1915

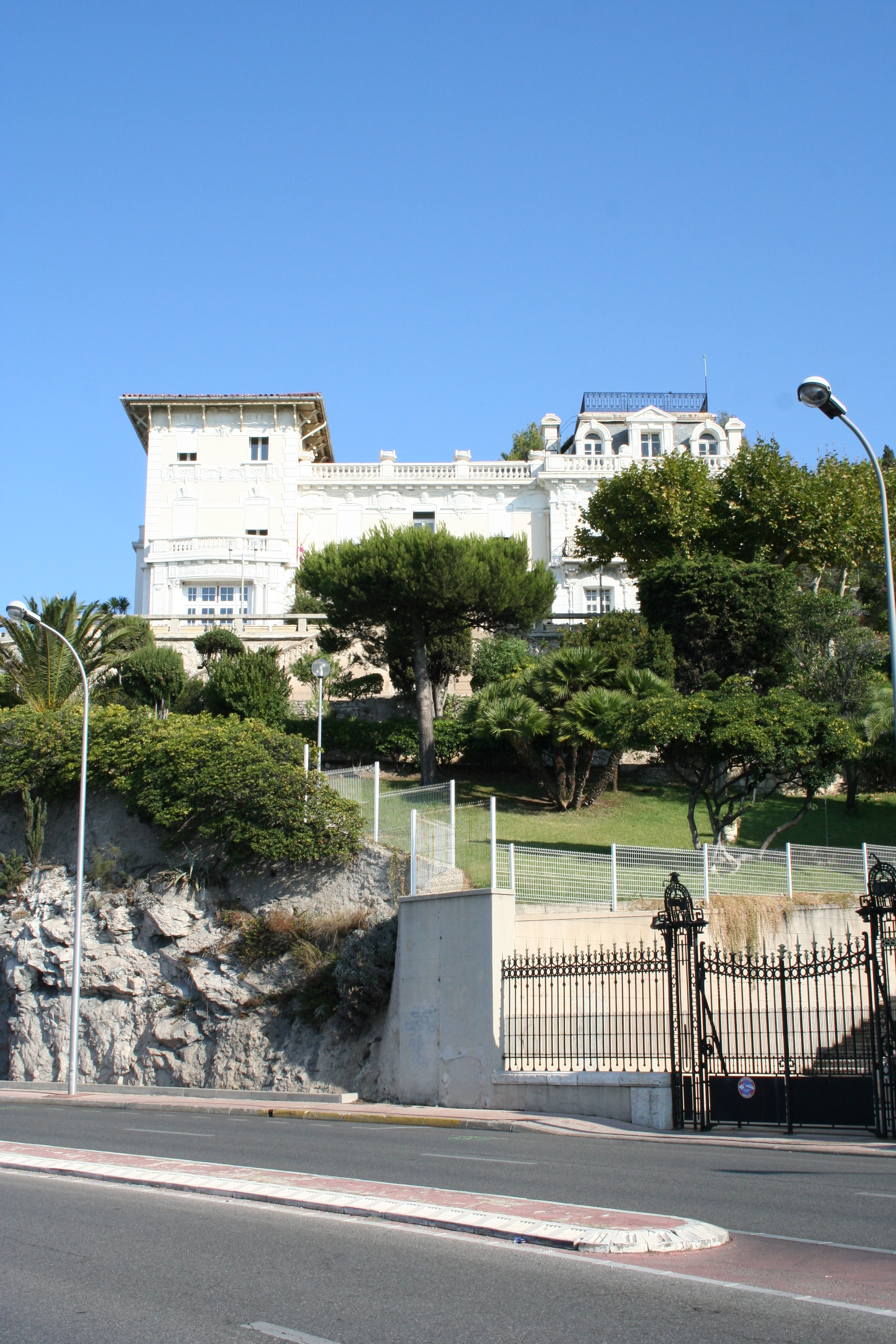
House of Gaby Deslys at 299 Kennedy Avenue in Marseille

Deslys' celebrity rose following newspaper stories which gossiped about King Manuel II of Portugal's infatuation with her. During the king's visit to Paris in December 1909, he was introduced to Deslys and immediately began a relationship with her.

It was thought that after this first meeting the King sent Deslys a pearl necklace worth $70,000. Their relationship was anything but discreet (she would arrive before night at the Palácio das Necessidades and would pass through Portugal unnoticed; meanwhile, they were on the front pages of newspapers in Europe and North America, especially after he was deposed in 1910.

In public interviews, usually on trips, Deslys never negated the obvious, but nearly always refused to comment on her relationship with the deposed king. However, in an interview to a correspondent while she was in Vienna Deslys was very forthright:

A large concert was given in Lisbon at the beginning of February of this year, for the benefit of the victims of the Oporto fire, and the King invited me to perform at the concert. I arrived at Lisbon and put up at the Palace Hotel, near the Royal Palace. I was then attacked by the Republican newspapers because reports had been spread that I had put up at the Royal Palace itself [...] These suspicions [of the King's financial difficulties] are entirely unfounded, for the trifling gifts he made me were not sufficiently expensive to affect even a middle-class budget. I support myself entirely alone in Vienna, and later on I expect to fulfill an engagement in Berlin. My agreement here entitles me to £4560 for three months, and I do not even know whether my income does not exceed the King's revenues.

After his exile, they would continue to meet, especially while she had stage engagements in London.

When Deslys moved to New York, in the summer of 1911, their relationship cooled off; Deslys became involved with a fellow stage actor Harry Pilcer, and Manuel married in 1913. Despite this, she maintained her contacts with Manuel's personal secretary, the Marquês of Lavradio.

Deslys and Pilcer became a successful dance act duo during the First World War on a par with the Castles, but it is unclear if they ever legally married.

== Death and legacy ==
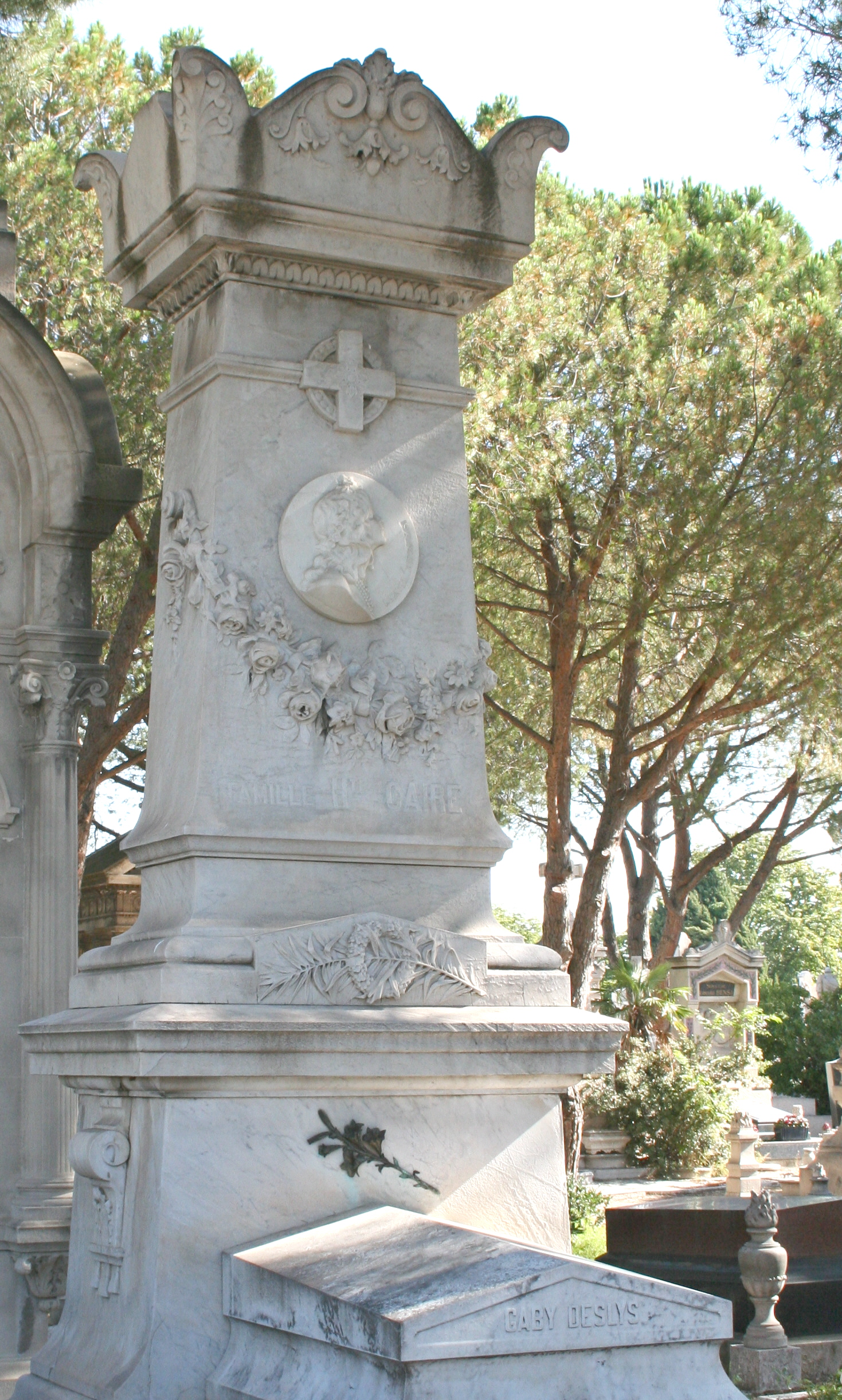
Grave of Gabrielle Caire alias Gaby Deslys in Marseille

Deslys contracted a severe throat infection caused by the Spanish flu pandemic in December 1919. She was operated on multiple times in an effort to eradicate the infection, on two occasions without the use of an anesthetic. Surgeons were inhibited by Deslys' demand that they must not scar her neck.

She died in rue Antoine-Chantin, Paris 14 on 11 February 1920. In her will, Deslys left her villa on the Marseille Corniche Road, and all of her property in Marseille, to the poor of Marseille. The property was valued at $500,000. Her other assets were valued at £7,225.

According to the Pittsburgh Press on 18 July 1920: "In an adjoining room was the exquisite bed that belonged to the celebrated Dutchess de Fontanges--one of several beds of equal historical value which Gaby used in rotation. In cabinets about her were Limoges enamels that had been the joy of great King Francis I. On the walls were paintings by Botticelli and other early Italian masters. On the book shelves were priceless volumes printed by Elzevir and Aldus Manutius."

Her carved and gilded bed, July 1922 was inspired by the boat in the "Grotto of Venus" scene from the opera "Tannhauser". On its bow, there are two boiseries, 13 August 2022 with images from Boucher's "Cupid's Target". The bed was bought at auction in Marseille by Metro Pictures. It was used in the 1922 film Trifling Women, starring Barbara La Marr. Later, it came into the possession of the Universal Studios prop department, and it was used in the 1925 film The Phantom of the Opera. In 1934, it was used as Lily Garland's bed in Twentieth Century and in 1950, it was in Sunset Boulevard as the bed of Norma Desmond. In 1964, it appeared in a dream sequence in the film Good Neighbor Sam.

In 1943, her life story was bought by MGM as a potential film property for Judy Garland to be produced by Arthur Freed, but it was shelved after a few script treatments.

Liane de Pougy (1869-1950)'s diaries from 1919 to 1941, published as Mes cahiers bleus in French in 1977, and My Blue Notebooks in English in 1979, describe her.

She was portrayed humorously by the ballerina Tamara Toumanova in the Sigmund Romberg biopic Deep in My Heart (1954), directed by Stanley Donen.

In 1986 James Gardiner wrote a biography of Deslys' life, titled Gaby Deslys: A Fatal Attraction; material from it is available online.

== Filmography ==
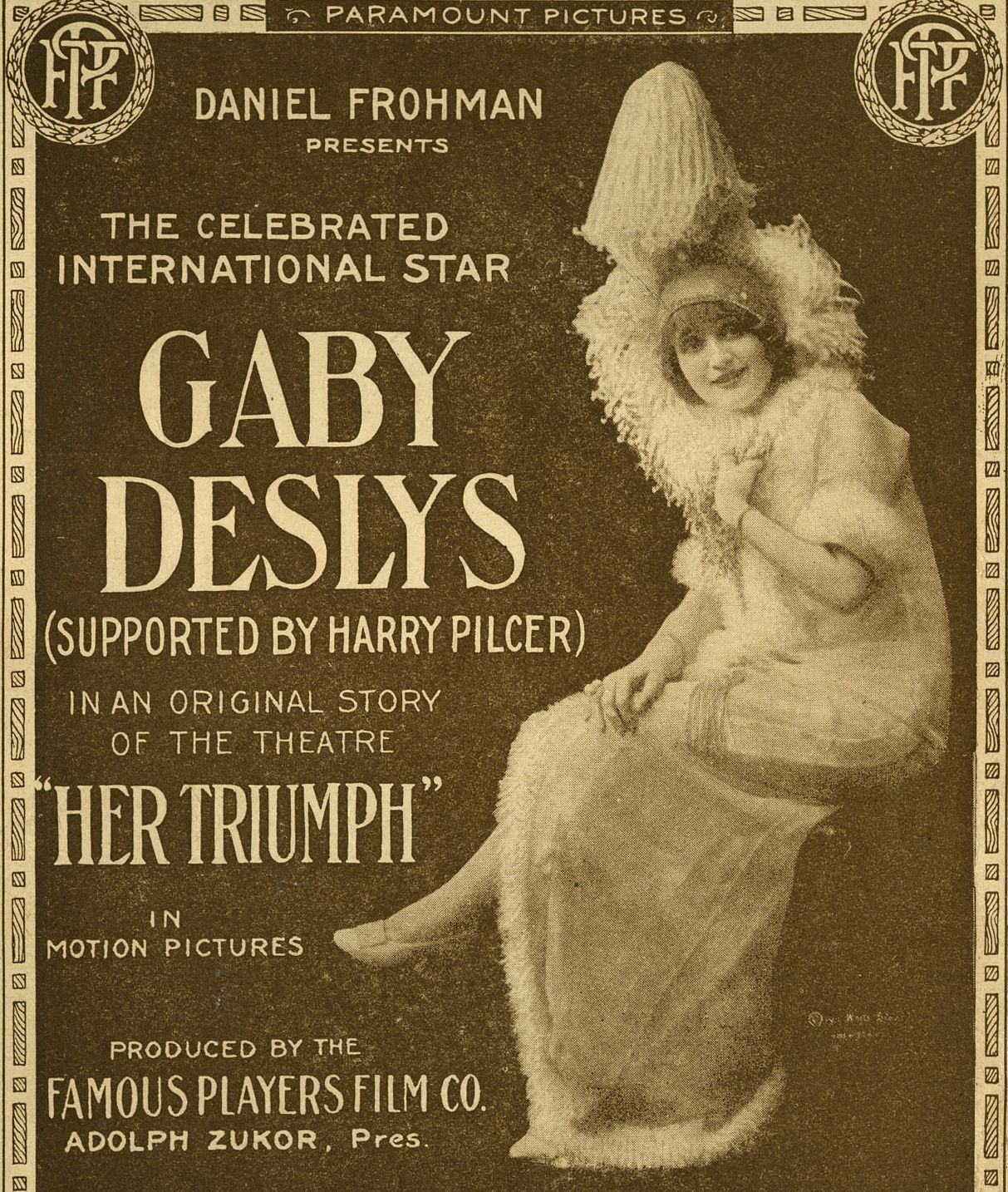
Poster for Deslys' only US film, Her Triumph 1915

(all are believed to be lost films)

- La remplaçante (short film, 1914)
- Her Triumph (1915, only American film)
- Rosy Rapture (1915)
- Infatuation (*aka Bouclette) (1918)
- Le Dieu du hasard (1921)

== Theatre ==
- The Revue of Revues (27 September 1911 - 11 November 1911)
- Vera Violetta (20 November 1911 - 24 February 1912)
- The Honeymoon Express (6 February 1913 - 14 June 1913)
- The Belle of Bond Street (30 March 1914 - 9 May 1914)
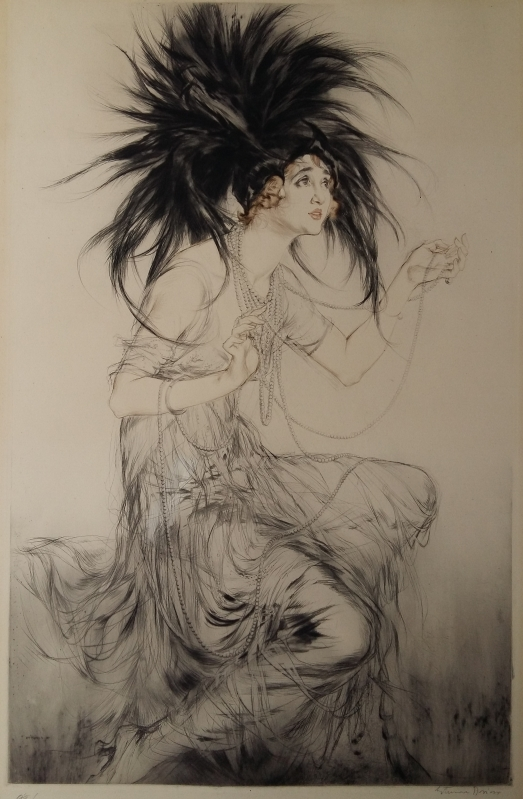
  Gaby Deslys portrait, 191?
- Stop! Look! Listen! (25 December 1915 - 25 March 1916)

== Discography ==
- Philomène (1910, His Master's Voice)
- Tout en Rose (1910, His Master's Voice)
- La Parisienne (1910, Unreleased)
