= Horseshoe Lake, Arkansas =

Horseshoe Lake
- Town
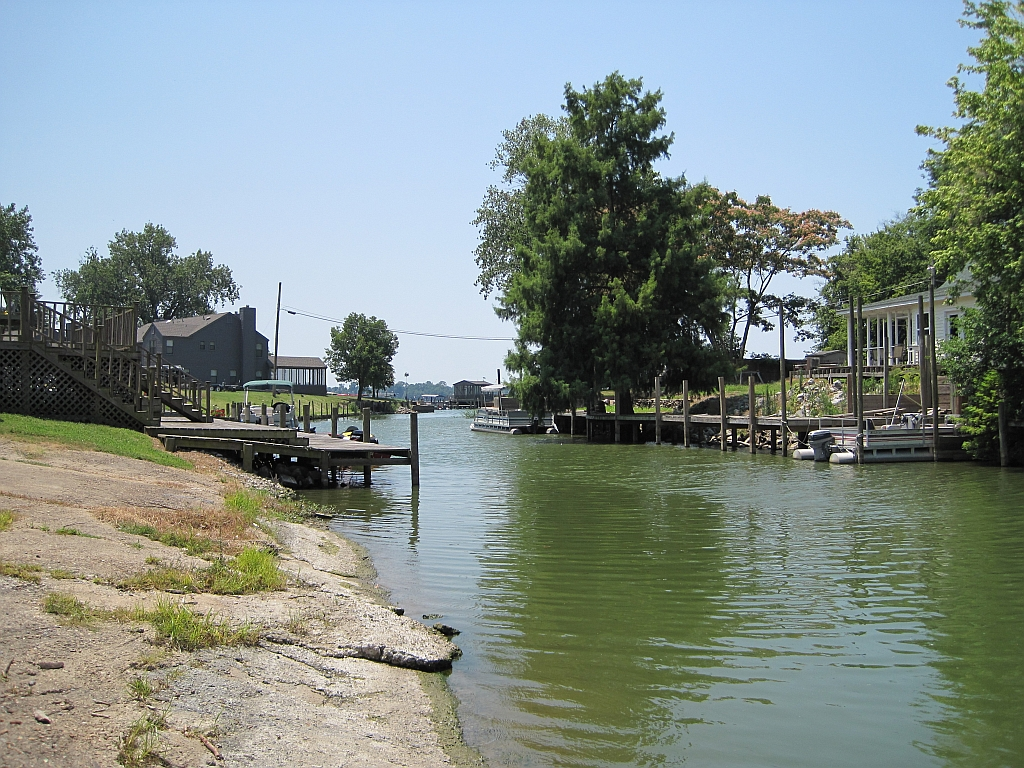

- Location of Horseshoe Lake in Crittenden County, Arkansas.
- Coordinates: 34°54′49″N 90°18′29″W
- Country: United States
- State: Arkansas
- County: Crittenden

Area
  - Total: 0.16 sq mi (0.41 km^{2})
  - Land: 0.15 sq mi (0.40 km^{2})
  - Water: 0.0077 sq mi (0.02 km^{2})
- Elevation: 200 ft (61 m)

Population (2020)
  - Total: 264
  - Estimate (2025): 251 ▼
  - Density: 1,722.7/sq mi (665.13/km^{2})
- Time zone: UTC−06:00 (CST)
  - Summer (DST): UTC−05:00 (CDT)
- FIPS code: 05-33375
- GNIS feature ID: 2405867

Horseshoe Lake is a town in Crittenden County, Arkansas, United States. The population was 264 at the 2020 census.

The town is named after Horseshoe Lake, an oxbow lake at the eastern tip of which the town is located.

== Geography ==
Horseshoe Lake is located in southern Crittenden County. The Mississippi River is 2 miles (3 km) to the south.

According to the United States Census Bureau, the town has a total area of 0.14 square miles (0.35 km^{2}), all land.

The elevation of Horseshoe Lake is 203 feet (62 m) above sea level.

=== The Horseshoe Lake ===
The town of Horseshoe Lake is situated in the Mississippi River floodplain at the eastern tip of a horseshoe-shaped water body named Horseshoe Lake, which the town is named after. The Lake is a summer recreation spot for residents of nearby Memphis offering boating, swimming, and fishing.

Changes in the course of the Mississippi River resulted in the shape of the lake. The lake is a former meander in the Mississippi River that was cut off, shortening the river, and is no longer connected to the river.

Horseshoe shaped lakes or oxbow lakes are not unusual in the flat plains of the lower Mississippi and other rivers.

== Demographics ==
Historical population
Census	Pop.	Note	%±
1990	298		—
2000	321		7.7%
2010	292		−9.0%
2020	264		−9.6%
2025 (est.)	251	▼	−4.9%
U.S. Decennial Census

At the 2000 census there were 321 people, 156 households, and 89 families in the town. The population density was 885.3/km^{2} (2,264.4/mi^{2}). There were 241 housing units at an average density of 664.6/km^{2} (1,700.1/mi^{2}). The racial makeup of the town was 94.39% White, 5.30% Black or African American, 0.31% from other races. 0.31% of the population were Hispanic or Latino of any race.

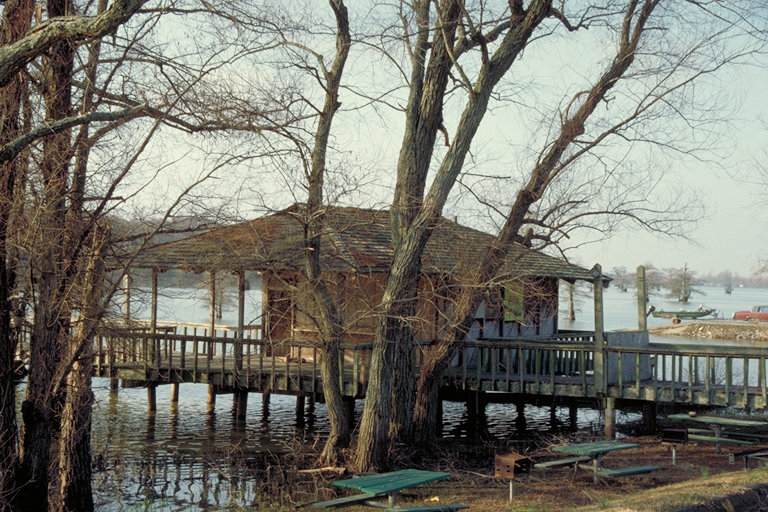
A marina house on the lake built on stilts.

Of the 156 households 18.6% had children under the age of 18 living with them, 47.4% were married couples living together, 4.5% had a female householder with no husband present, and 42.9% were non-families. 35.9% of households were one person and 16.7% were one person aged 65 or older. The average household size was 2.06 and the average family size was 2.65.

The age distribution was 17.4% under the age of 18, 4.0% from 18 to 24, 26.2% from 25 to 44, 27.4% from 45 to 64, and 24.9% 65 or older. The median age was 47 years. For every 100 females, there were 92.2 males. For every 100 females age 18 and over, there were 89.3 males.

The median household income was $30,083 and the median family income was $36,250. Males had a median income of $29,583 versus $23,750 for females. The per capita income for the town was $17,517. About 4.9% of families and 10.2% of the population were below the poverty line, including 3.9% of those under age 18 and 20.5% of those age 65 or over.

== Education ==
Residents are zoned to schools in the West Memphis School District, which operates Academies of West Memphis (formerly West Memphis High School). The community was previously in the Hughes School District, which operated Hughes High School.

On April 9, 2015, due to the low number of students in the Hughes district, the Arkansas Board of Education voted to consolidate the Hughes district into the West Memphis district 7–1.
