= Harry Pilcer =

American actor

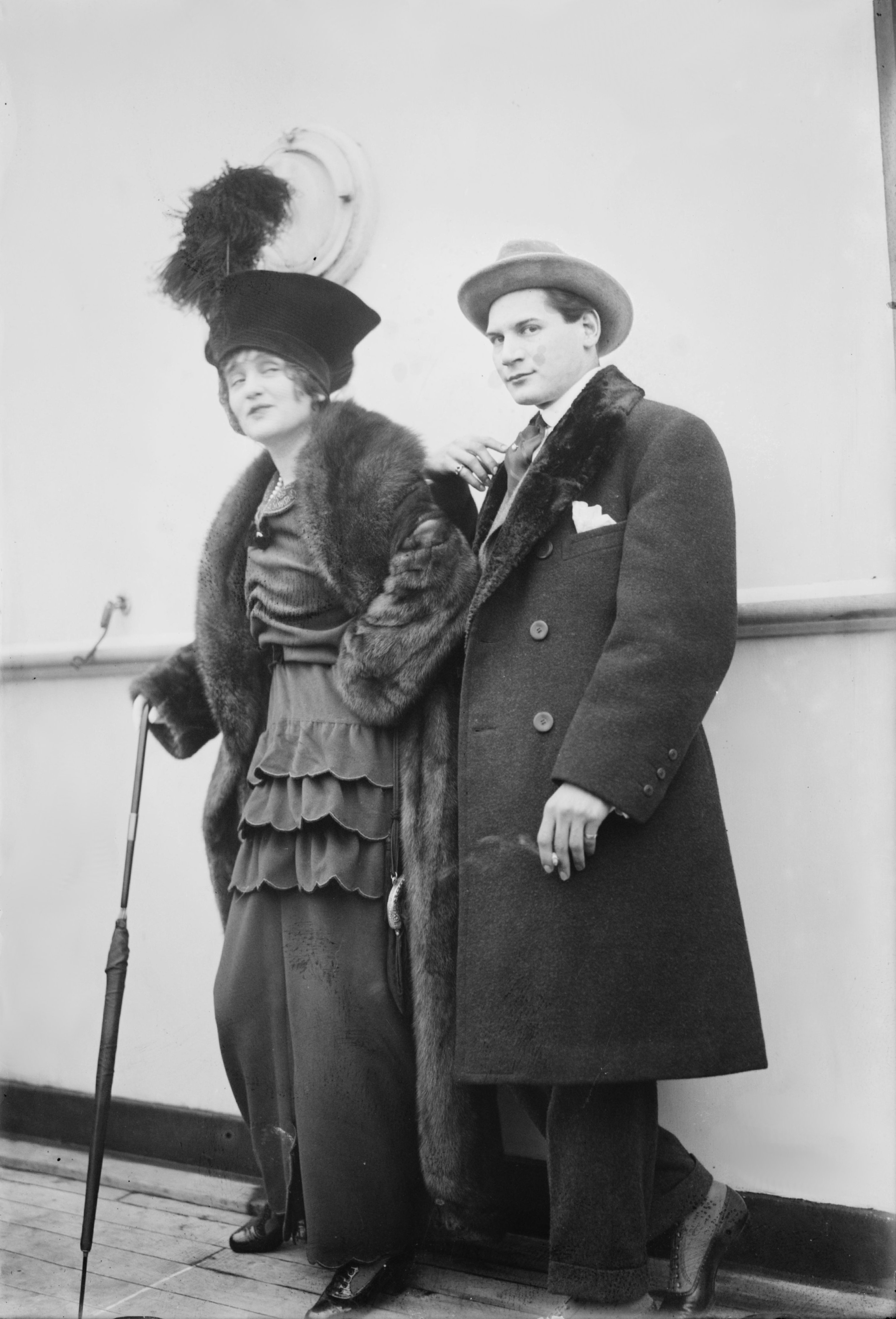
- Harry Pilcer with Gaby Deslys
- Born: April 29, 1885; New York City, New York
- Died: January 14, 1961 (aged 75); Cannes, Alpes-Maritimes, France
- Occupations: Actor, dancer
- Years active: 1907–1946
- Partner: Gaby Deslys

Harry Pilcer (April 29, 1885 – January 14, 1961) was an American actor, dancer, choreographer, and lyricist.

== Biography ==
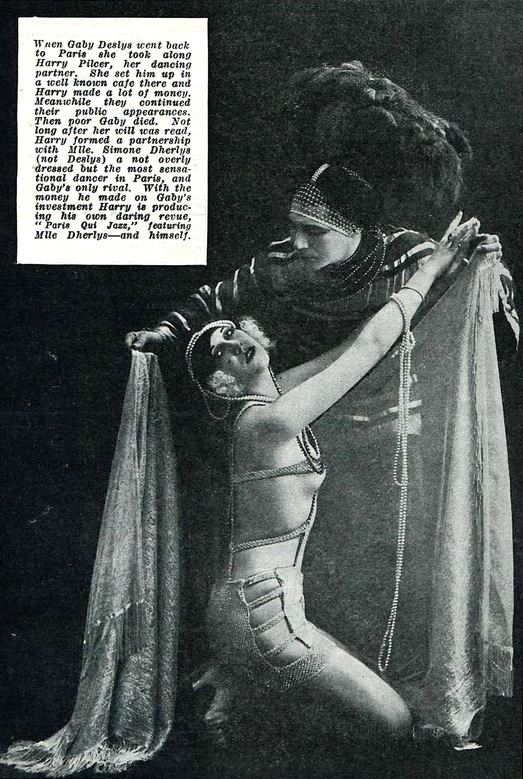
Harry Pilcer & Simone D'Herlys - Jan 1921 Tatler

Pilcer is mainly remembered for his association with French dancer and singer Gaby Deslys who may have been his wife. According to Fred Astaire's autobiography, Pilcer was a fellow student at Claude Alvienne's stage dancing and dramatic school in New York in 1905. Pilcer and Deslys appeared in four Broadway musicals together Vera Violetta (1911), The Honeymoon Express (1913), The Belle of Bond Street (1914) and Stop! Look! Listen! (1916). He composed Deslys's waltz The Gaby Glide. As a dance team Pilcer and Deslys were contemporaries to Vernon and Irene Castle, Florence Walton and "Maurice", Dorothy Dickson and husband Carl Hyson, and Genevieve Lyon and her husband John Murray Anderson. Pilcer and Deslys would probably have been the top dance team in both America and Europe had not World War I intervened and Deslys's death during the influenza pandemic in 1920. Pilcer also danced with Mistinguett and Teddy Bernard. After 1922 Pilcer ran a school of dancing in Paris. He was also a famous Master of Ceremonies at the Casinos of Deauville and Cannes, as well as at leading Paris music halls. Pilcer co-starred with Deslys in her 1915 silent film Her Triumph (1915).

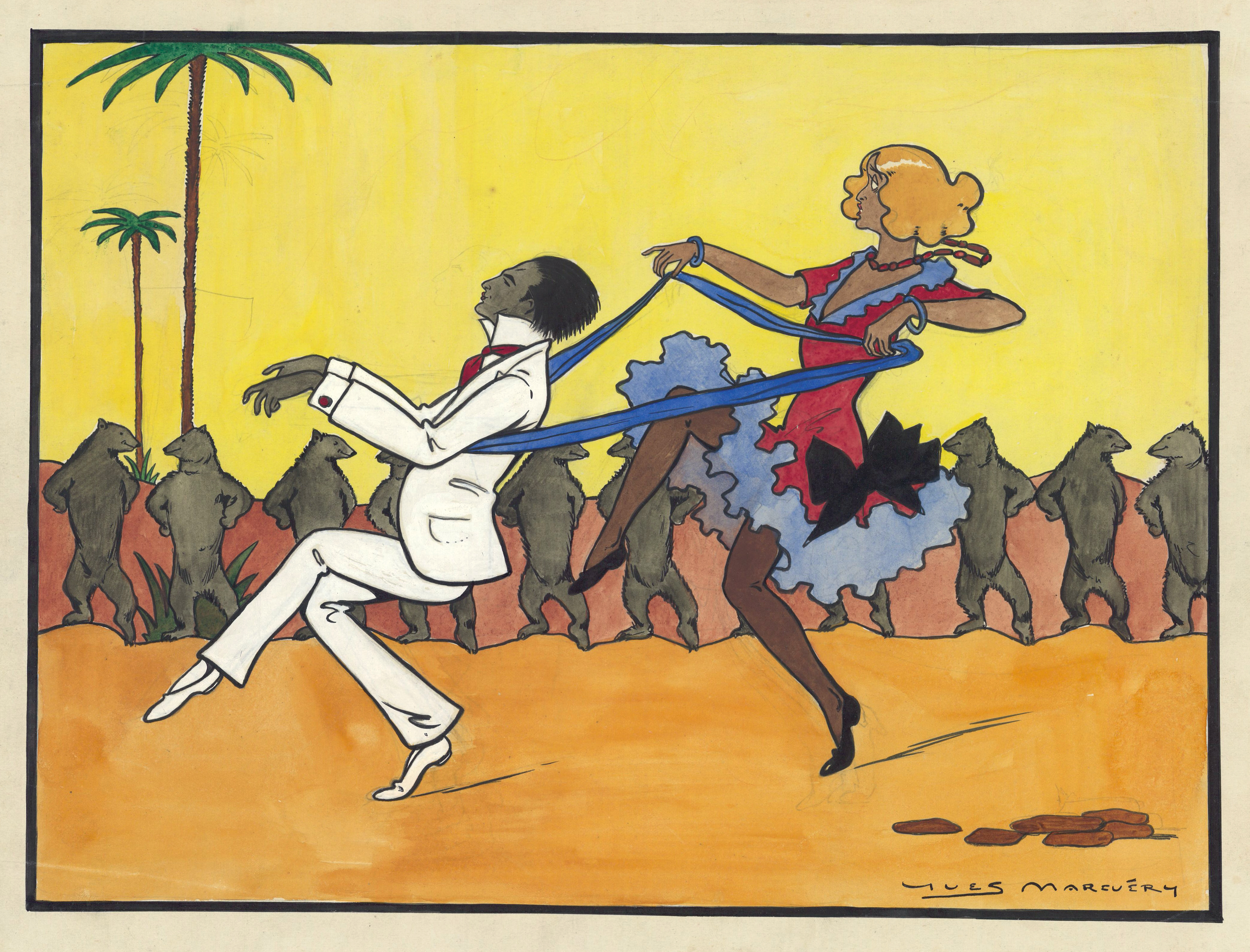
Gaby Deslys et Harry Pilcer (1912) by Yves Marevéry

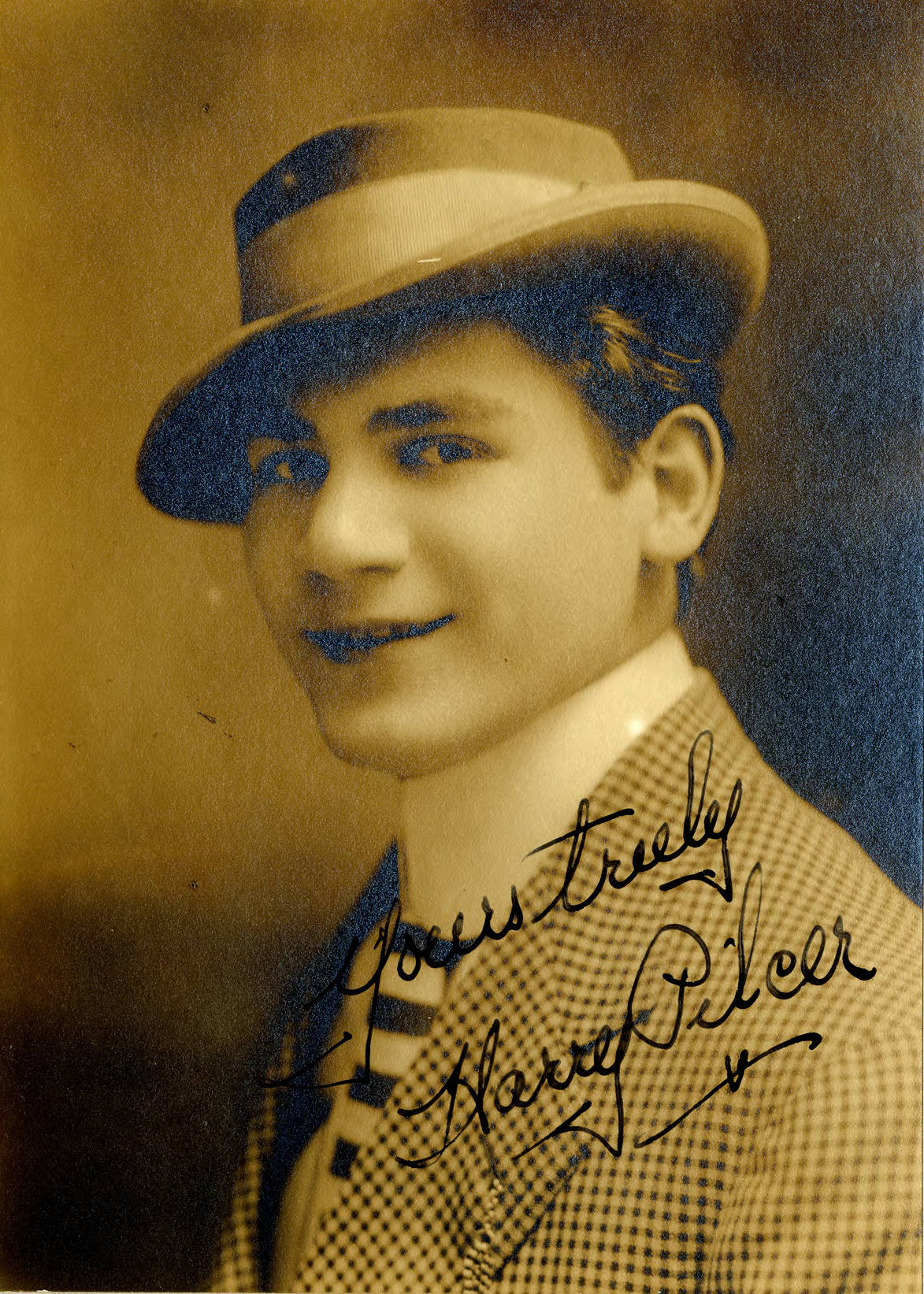
Harry Pilcer (1908) studio of Joseph Hall

Pilcer died at Cannes of a heart attack January 14, 1961.

== Filmography ==
- Her Triumph (1915)
- Bouclette a.k.a. Infatuation (1918)
- Le Dieu du hasard (1921)
- Distress (1929)
- An Ideal Woman (1929)
- Thank Your Lucky Stars (1943)
- The Razor's Edge (1946)
