= The Little Blue Devil =

The Little Blue Devil was a musical comedy by Harold Atteridge and Harry Carroll that premiered on November 3, 1919 at the Central Theater on Broadway. It ran for 74 performances.

== Plot ==
The show opens at the office of the fictional New York Inter-County Railroad. Augustus Rollett hires a local dancer, "Little Blue Devil", to pretend she is his wife and flirt with his boss. He then uses their flirtation to urge he get a raise. His actual wife finds out and uses the dancer to patch up her own marriage. The second act takes place in the apartment of "Little Blue Devil". The third act takes place in the home of Augustus Rollett.

== Cast ==
- Bernard Granville as Augustus Rollett
- Lillian Lorraine as Paulette Divine, the "Little Blue Devil"
- Anne Sands as Mrs. Rollett
- Edward Martindale as George Wallus
