= Alice Richardson (artist) =

British artist

Alice Richardson was an English pastellist active in London between 1769 and 1777.

Richardson exhibited pastels at the Society of Artists of the United Kingdom from 1769 until 1775, giving a variety of London addresses during her exhibiting career. She submitted three pastels to the Royal Academy from 4 College Street, Westminster, in 1776; this was the same address given by one "Miss Alice Roberts" in a 1777 submission to the Society of Artists. The two were one and the same, as on 28 December 1776 Richardson had married on Benjamin Roberts, a union which may have been her second marriage.
