= Alice Roberts (actress) =

Belgian actress

- Born: 29 July 1906; Belgium
- Died: 29 October 1985 (aged 79); Belgium
- Occupation: Actress

Alice Roberts (29 July 1906 – 29 October 1985) was a Belgian actress active from the late 1920s to the late 1930s.

She may be best-remembered in Georg Wilhelm Pabst's silent German film Pandora's Box (1929). The film was memorable due to the overt lesbian overtures between Roberts' character, the Countess Geschwitz, and Louise Brooks's character, Lulu. Some scholars count her performance "one of the first cinematic representations not only of lesbian desire, but of an explicitly queer female masculinity."

The film was based on Frank Wedekind's plays Earth Spirit and Pandora’s Box.

Alice Roberts died in 1985, aged 79, in Belgium.

== Filmography ==
| Year | Title | Role | International title |
|---|---|---|---|
| 1932 | My Priest Among the Rich | | |
| 1931 | Le Costaud des PTT | | |
| 1930 | Quand nous étions deux | Lise Daltour | |
| 1929 | Der Narr seiner Liebe | | |
| 1929 | Der lustige Witwer | Alice Dulac | The Merry Widower |
| 1929 | Meineid | Inge Sperber | Perjury |
| 1929 | Die Büchse der Pandora | Gräfin Geschwitz - Countess Anna Geschwitz | Pandora's Box (UK), (US) |
| 1929 | Détresse | | Distress |
| 1928 | Das Schicksal derer von Habsburg | Louise of Coburg | The Fate of the House of Habsburg |
| 1928 | La femme rêvée | | An Ideal Woman (English title) |
| 1928 | L'île d'amour | La nurse | Island of Love (English title) |
| 1928 | Miss Édith, duchesse | | Miss Edith, Duchess (English title) |
