= Bernard Granville =

American actor, singer and minstrel show performer

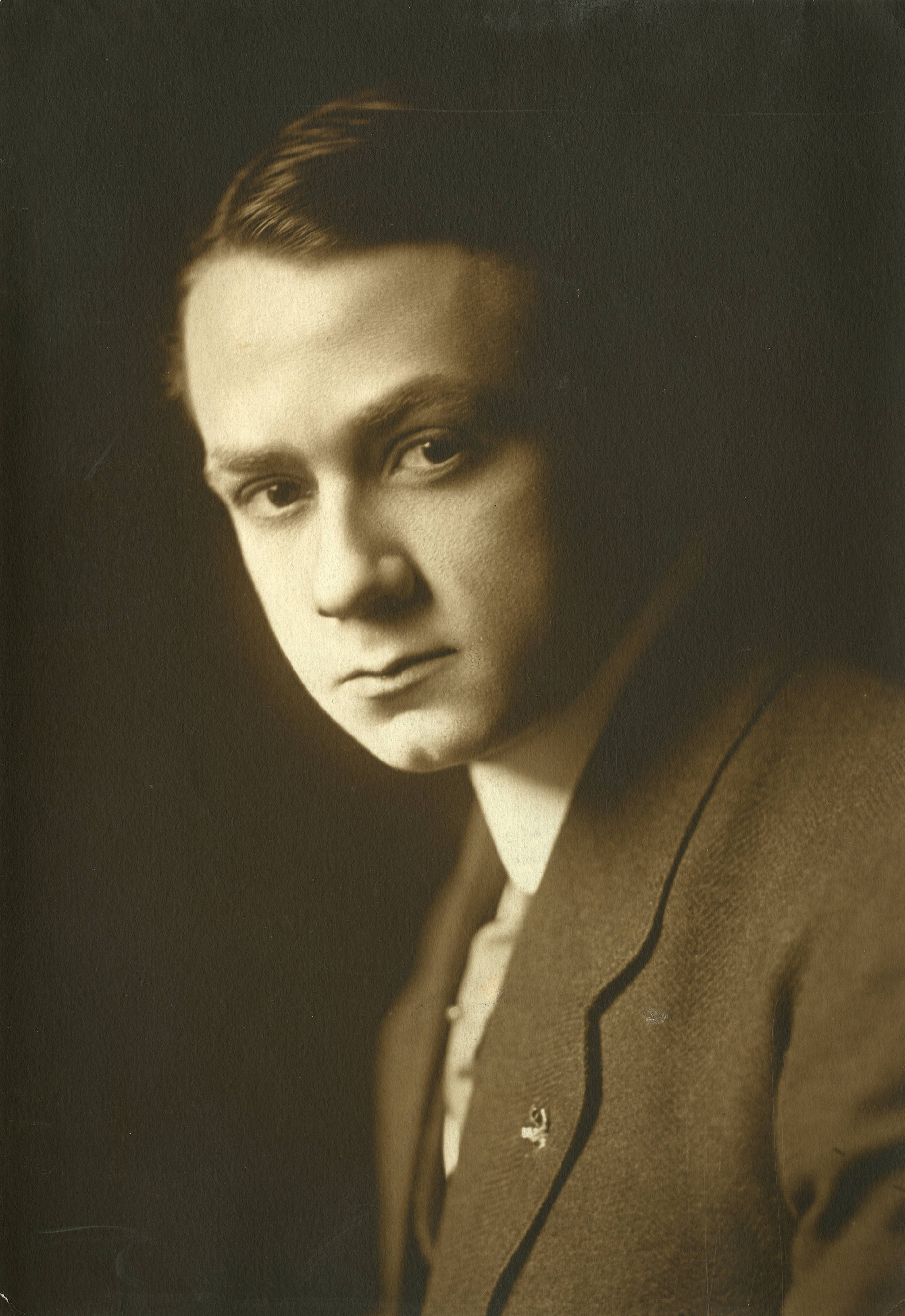
Stage actor Bernard Granville

Bernard R. Granville (July 4, 1888 – October 5, 1936) was an American actor, singer and minstrel show performer who was discovered by Florenz Ziegfeld and was known as "the twentieth century comedian".

== Biography ==
He was born on July 4, 1888, in West Virginia, the only child of Algernon Granville and Cora B Chamberlain Granville (1864-1937).

He started his career as a minstrel show performer with Al G. Field at age 18, in 1906. He worked there until 1911. He worked as a circus clown for Ringling Brothers then went back to a minstrel show with Donnely and Hatfield

He performed in Marriage a la Carte at the La Salle Theater in Chicago, Illinois, in 1911. He performed in A Winsome Widow at the Moulin Rouge in Manhattan, New York City. He then appeared in the Ziegfeld Follies of 1912, 1915, and 1916.

He served in World War I as a lieutenant and a pilot in France.

He married Rosina Timponi and they had a daughter Bonita Granville. They later divorced. He next married Eleanor Christie.

He died of pneumonia on October 5, 1936, in Hollywood, California.

== Broadway ==
- Whistling in the Dark (1932)
- Castles in the Air (1927) as Monty Blair
- Earl Carroll's Vanities (1923)
- Frank Fay's Fables (1922)
- Ziegfeld Follies of 1920
- Morris Gest's Midnight Whirl (1919)
- The Little Blue Devil (1919)
- Ziegfeld Follies of 1916
- Ziegfeld Follies of 1915
- Dancing Around (1914)
- The Passing Show of 1914
- The Whirl of the World (1914)
- Ziegfeld Follies of 1912
