= Hughes School District =

Defunct school district in Arkansas, United States

The Hughes School District, formerly located in Hughes, Arkansas, United States was a public school district that closed in the summer of 2015 due to declining enrollment.

The school district encompassed 226.21 square miles (585.9 km^{2}) of land in St. Francis County and Crittenden County. It included Hughes, Horseshoe Lake, and the St. Francis County section of Jennette.

== History and closure ==
The Hughes School District served a significant area encompassing parts of St. Francis County and Crittenden County, including Hughes, Horseshoe Lake, and a section of Jennette. Before desegregation around 1970, the district operated separate schools for white and black children.

In 2013, Sheryl Owens became the superintendent, marking a historic moment as the first African American woman in the Hughes district to hold that position. Despite efforts to sustain enrollment, the district faced persistent declindes starting around 1996, exacerbated after 2006. The Arkansas Board of Education, citing financial difficulties and enrollment criteria under Act 60, voted in April 2015 to consolidate the Hughes district with the West Memphis School District.

According to Owens, circa 1996 enrollments declined gradually, and then around 2006 became severe. Owens stated that prospective teachers were wary of going to work for a district that could be forcefully consolidated in the future, and so the district had issues with recruitment. Under Arkansas law Act 60, the state can forcefully merge a school district which has fewer than 350 total students for a consecutive period of two years with another school district.

=== Post-Closure Effects ===
After closure, the West Memphis School District assumed ownership of Hughes' school buildings, which subsequently deteriorated due to lack of maintenance. The community repurposed the high school gymnasium into an after-school center, demonstrating efforts to utilize the remaining facilities. Education Week stated that "The squat, brick buildings that were part of the Hughes district are in various stages of disrepair."

== Demographics and Academic Performance ==
In its final years, the Hughes School District had 318 students, with 94% being eligible for free or reduced lunches, indicating high levels of poverty. Academic performance was rated as "needs improvement" in the state assessments, reflecting ongoing challenges.

== Schools ==
The district comprised Mildred Jack Elementary School (formerly segregated for black students) and Hughes High School, with the Blue Devil as its mascot following the school colors of royal blue and white.

- Mildred Jackson Elementary School, served prekindergarten through grade 6.
- Hughes High School, served grades 7 through 12.

== Impact on the Community ==
Former Hughes board member Lincoln Barnett stated that several area businesses, as a result of the district closure, encountered financial problems. Hughes School District, in its existence, employed the largest number of people in Hughes.
