= Bushy =

Bushy may refer to:

== People ==
- Ron Bushy (born 1945), co-founder and drummer of the rock band Iron Butterfly
- Bushy Graham (1905–1982), Italian-American boxer
- Bushy or Bushie, informal American term for supporter of George H. W. Bush, George W. Bush, or Jeb Bush

== Places ==
- Bushy Island, Queensland, Australia
- Bushy Islet, Queensland, Australia
- Bushy Mountain, New South Wales, Australia
- Bushy Lake, California, United States

== Other uses ==
- Bushy, spelling of the name of the historical character John Bussy as it appears in Shakespeare's play Richard II

== See also ==
- Bushy Park (disambiguation)
- Bushy Creek
- Bushy House
- Bushy Run
- Bushy-crested (disambiguation)
- Bushi (disambiguation)
- Bushey (disambiguation)
