= Newcastle (clipper) =

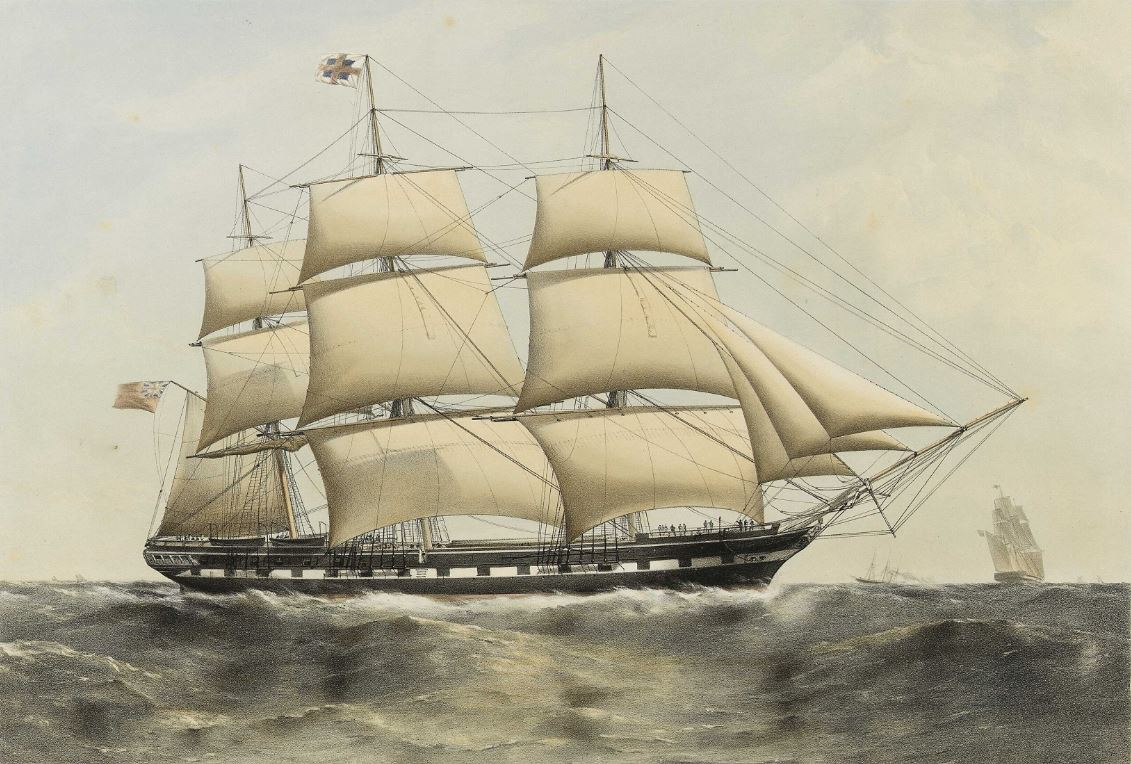
- Clipper Ship 'Newcastle' in 1857, lithograph by T. G. Dutton

History
- Name: Newcastle
- Operator: Green Blackwall line
- Port of registry: London
- Route: London - India / Australia
- Builder: W. Pile junior at Sunderland
- Out of service: 1883
- Fate: Wrecked in the Torres Strait

General characteristics
- Tonnage: 1275
- Propulsion: Full sail

The Newcastle was a clipper ship of the Green Blackwell line that operated on routes from England to India and Australia in the late 19th century. Built in 1857 in Sunderland, England, she was wrecked near the northern tip of Queensland, Australia, in 1883.

== History ==
The Newcastle launched in 1857, 1275 tons, was built by W. Pile junior at Sunderland for Richard Green's London to India service. The National Maritime Museum in Greenwich has a bill of sale for the transaction (NMM MS GRN 14). She was designed by the noted naval architect Bernard Waymouth (1824–1890). Waymouth went on to design the Leander (1867) and the Thermopylae (1868). He also served as Lloyd's Register's senior surveyor for London. The Newcastle was drawn by the artist William Foster in 1857, and his picture was made into a lithograph that same year by Thomas Goldsworthy Dutton; she was shown flying the Green Blackwall line House flag on her main mast. Her first commander was R.D. Crawford.

During a large part of the 1860s she was a troop carrier between London and Calcutta.

After the opening of the Suez Canal in 1869 she carried passengers to Melbourne.

She served for years on the London to Australia route, carrying mail and cargo.

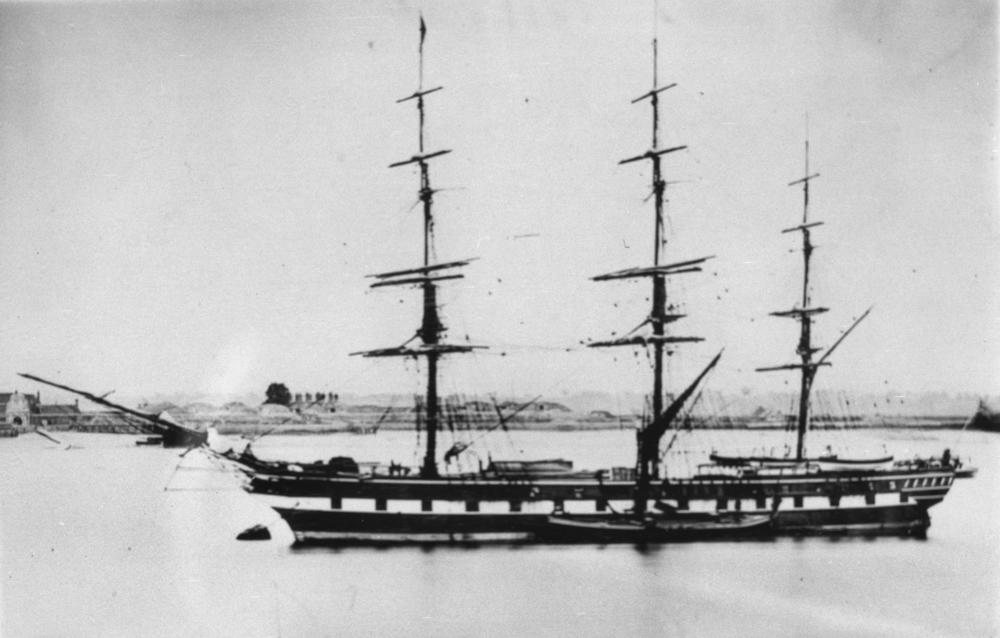
Sailing ship Newcastle, wrecked in the Torres Strait. (Description supplied with the photograph).

Sometime shortly before June 1883 when underway to Thursday Island to be hulked, she was stranded at Bushy Islet, in the Torres Strait. She was soon reported as having broken up. The wreck was sold at Thursday Island according to the Sydney Morning Herald on 21 June 1883. The Brisbane Courier of 31 July 1883 and The Queenslander of 4 August 1883 tell us that she "remained fast upon the reef". The Asteria, and Jemima, along with several lighters arrived at the wreck to recover the cargo. The salvage team employed several of the crew in the task, and the remaining members were transported to Sydney. In July 1883 the cargo was salvaged, the vessel stripped of its copper fastenings and blown up using explosives.
