= White root =

White root or white-root is a common name for several plants and may refer to:

- 'Albino' heirloom beetroot - an heirloom variety of beetroot.
- Aletris farinosa - "white colic-root", a perennial herb found across much of the eastern United States.
- Asclepias tuberosa - a perennial milkweed native to eastern North America.
- Carex barbarae - a species of sedge native to California and south Oregon.
- Nabalus albus - "white rattlesnake root", a plant in the family Asteraceae, native to Canada and the Eastern United States.
- Pratia purpurascens - a small herbaceous scrambling herb of eastern Australia.
