= Bushi =

Bushi and similar can refer to:

== People ==
- Alban Bushi (born 1973), Albanian footballer
- Bushi Moletsane (born 1984), Mosotho footballer
- Bushi (wrestler) (born 1983), Japanese professional wrestler
- Fatmir Bushi (born 1963), Albanian weightlifter

== Other uses ==
- Bushi (music), a genre of Japanese folk music
- Bushi (region), a region in the Democratic Republic of the Congo
- Bushi (warrior), a Japanese word for "warrior", often used to refer to a samurai
- Bushi language, a language of Madagascar and Mayotte
- Bushi Station, a railway station Iruma, Saitama, Japan
- Bushi, a short-lived clothing line founded by Busta Rhymes

== See also ==
- Bushie, a derogatory statement for an American political supporter of George H. W. Bush, George W. Bush, or Jeb Bush
- Bushey (disambiguation)
- Bushy (disambiguation)
