= Bush Lake =

Bush Lake is the name of several lakes in the United States.

- Bush Lake (Hennepin County, Minnesota)
- Bush Lake (Wyoming)

See also

- Bushy Lake
