= List of lakes of Crittenden County, Arkansas =

There are at least 41 named lakes and reservoirs in Crittenden County, Arkansas.

== Lakes ==
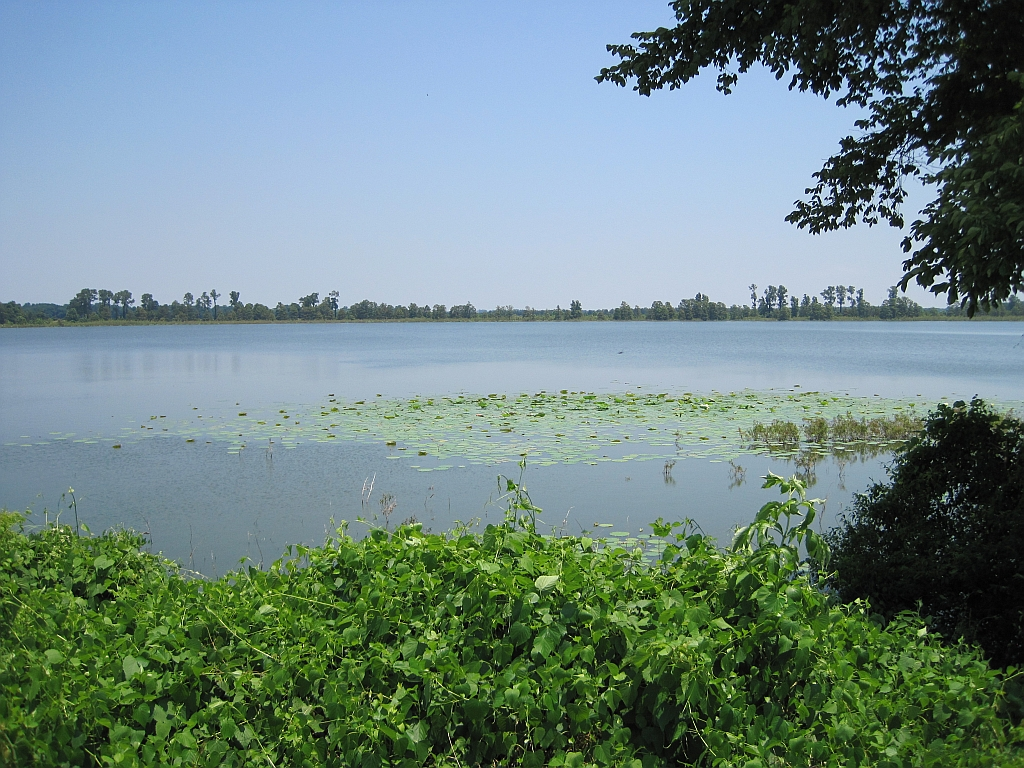
Horseshoe Lake is the namesake for the community Horseshoe Lake, Arkansas

- Beautiful Lake, 35°21′24″N 090°26′41″W, el. 203 feet (62 m)
- Benwood Lake, 35°17′41″N 090°18′27″W, el. 213 feet (65 m)
- Big Lake, 35°21′14″N 090°25′11″W, el. 203 feet (62 m)
- Blackfish Lake, 35°07′20″N 090°27′08″W, el. 184 feet (56 m)
- Blue Lake, 35°01′15″N 090°19′13″W, el. 194 feet (59 m)
- Brougham Lake, 35°18′07″N 090°24′31″W, el. 200 feet (61 m)
- Buck Lake, 35°11′56″N 090°25′21″W, el. 200 feet (61 m)
- Bushy Lake, 34°53′45″N 090°20′47″W, el. 194 feet (59 m)
- Cane Lake, 35°17′51″N 090°29′22″W, el. 203 feet (62 m)
- Copperas Lake, 35°03′56″N 090°17′06″W, el. 200 feet (61 m)
- Danner Lake, 35°18′40″N 090°08′58″W, el. 210 feet (64 m)
- Dead Timber Lake, 35°26′38″N 090°17′39″W, el. 217 feet (66 m)
- Fletcher Lake, 35°05′32″N 090°12′03″W, el. 203 feet (62 m)
- Goose Lake, 34°54′24″N 090°20′09″W, el. 190 feet (58 m)
- Grassy Lake, 35°04′02″N 090°12′33″W, el. 207 feet (63 m)
- Holden Lake, 35°14′20″N 090°25′38″W, el. 203 feet (62 m)
- Hood Lake, 35°20′53″N 090°27′05″W, el. 203 feet (62 m)
- Hopefield Chute, 35°10′03″N 090°05′39″W, el. 203 feet (62 m)
- Hopefield Lake, 35°08′24″N 090°04′45″W, el. 207 feet (63 m)
- Horseshoe Lake, 34°56′01″N 090°20′37″W, el. 190 feet (58 m)
- Island Forty Chute, 35°15′38″N 090°09′23″W, el. 207 feet (63 m)
- Lake David, 35°23′30″N 090°16′06″W, el. 223 feet (68 m)
- Lake Deloche, 34°55′19″N 090°17′22″W, el. 200 feet (61 m)
- Lewis Lake, 35°19′35″N 090°27′31″W, el. 210 feet (64 m)
- Little Grassy Lake, 35°21′06″N 090°25′52″W, el. 203 feet (62 m)
- Long Pond, 35°03′42″N 090°15′50″W, el. 200 feet (61 m)
- Marion Lake, 35°11′54″N 090°09′36″W, el. 207 feet (63 m)
- McCarter Lake, 35°12′21″N 090°08′11″W, el. 213 feet (65 m)
- Meneshea Lake, 35°25′40″N 090°12′23″W, el. 217 feet (66 m)
- Mound City Chute, 35°10′58″N 090°07′00″W, el. 207 feet (63 m)
- North Lake, 35°24′13″N 090°06′37″W, el. 213 feet (65 m)
- Old River Lake, 34°50′42″N 090°19′09″W, el. 190 feet (58 m)
- Porter Lake, 34°53′03″N 090°20′04″W, el. 190 feet (58 m)
- Shell Lake, 35°08′23″N 090°29′41″W, el. 197 feet (60 m)
- South Lake, 35°21′05″N 090°06′47″W, el. 213 feet (65 m)
- Stave Lake, 35°26′15″N 090°11′28″W, el. 217 feet (66 m)
- Stump Lake, 35°22′10″N 090°26′06″W, el. 207 feet (63 m)
- Swan Lake, 35°03′06″N 090°15′12″W, el. 203 feet (62 m)
- Wapanocca Lake, 35°20′43″N 090°14′03″W, el. 207 feet (63 m)

== Reservoirs ==
- Dead Timber Lake, 35°25′39″N 090°20′14″W, el. 217 feet (66 m)
- Luss Lake, 35°25′19″N 090°24′16″W, el. 210 feet (64 m)

== See also ==
- List of lakes in Arkansas
