= Bushey (disambiguation) =

Bushey is a town in England.

Bushey may also refer to:

- Bushey railway station, Hertfordshire, England
- Bushey Studios, a British film studio in the town
- Bushey Grammar School, a former school in the town
- Duane R. Bushey (born 1944), seventh Master Chief Petty Officer of the Navy
- Frank Bushey (1906–1972), American Major League Baseball pitcher
- Trent Bushey (born 1964), American actor
- J. Calvin Bushey, a pseudonym used by American composer and music publisher Will Lamartine Thompson (1847–1909)

== See also ==
- Bushey v. New York State Civil Service Commission, an American labor law case
- Bushi (disambiguation)
- Bushy (disambiguation)
