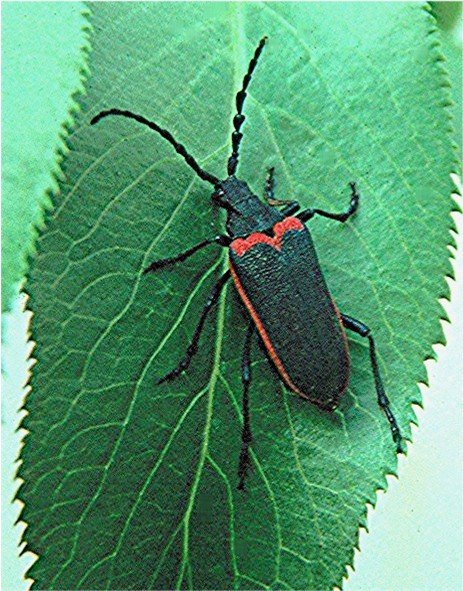

Conservation status
- Vulnerable (NatureServe)

Scientific classification
- Kingdom: Animalia
- Phylum: Arthropoda
- Clade: Pancrustacea
- Class: Insecta
- Order: Coleoptera
- Suborder: Polyphaga
- Infraorder: Cucujiformia
- Family: Cerambycidae
- Genus: Desmocerus
- Species: D. californicus

Binomial name
- Desmocerus californicus Horn, 1881

= Desmocerus californicus =

Species of beetle

Desmocerus californicus, the California elderberry borer, is a species of the Lepturinae subfamily in the family of long-horned beetles. This species is endemic to the United States. The adult beetle feeds on the pollen of Sambucus species.

== Subspecies ==
- Desmocerus californicus californicus Horn, 1881
- Desmocerus californicus dimorphus Fisher, 1921
