= Thomas Goldsworthy Dutton =

English marine lithographer (1820–1891)

Thomas Goldsworthy Dutton (1820–1891) was a 19th-century English marine lithographer, draftsman, watercolourist, painter, and etcher.

== Early life ==
Born in 1820 in London, Middlesex, England, and named after his father, an Ironmonger. Dutton married Martha Foster on 27 Apr 1843, at St John, Hackney, Middlesex. He lived thereafter mainly in Lambeth.

== Career ==
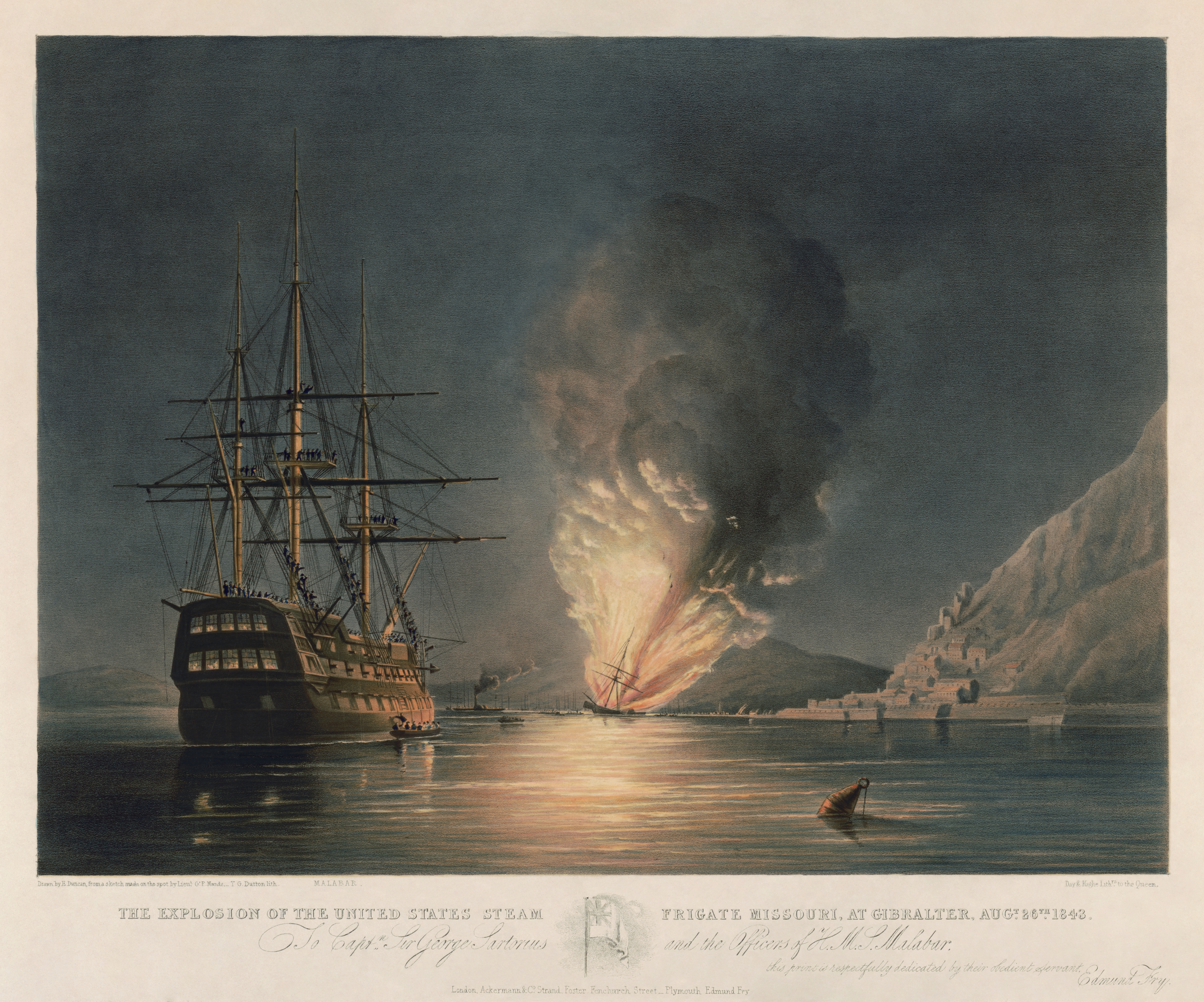
""The Explosion of the United States Steam Frigate Missouri": Lithograph by Dutton after a drawing by Edward Duncan based on a sketch George Pechell Mends

He has the reputation of being one of the finest lithographers of 19th-century nautical scenes and ship portraits. He was also a noted watercolorist, and oil painter. His marine paintings were generally created for his lithographs. These original works are quite rare in the marketplace.

He practised from premises in Fleet Street, London, and his work was often exhibited at the Suffolk Street Gallery between 1858 and 1879. Much of his work was for the lithographic printing company Day and Haghe.

The National Maritime Museum, Greenwich, holds almost a complete collection of his published lithographs.

He is often incorrectly named as Thomas Goldsworth Dutton on the web. He usually signed his work as "T. G. Dutton". Some water colours as "Thomas G Dutton" and there are oils signed "TGD", in one case at least on a buoy hidden within the painting. His work is known for its accuracy and attention to detail

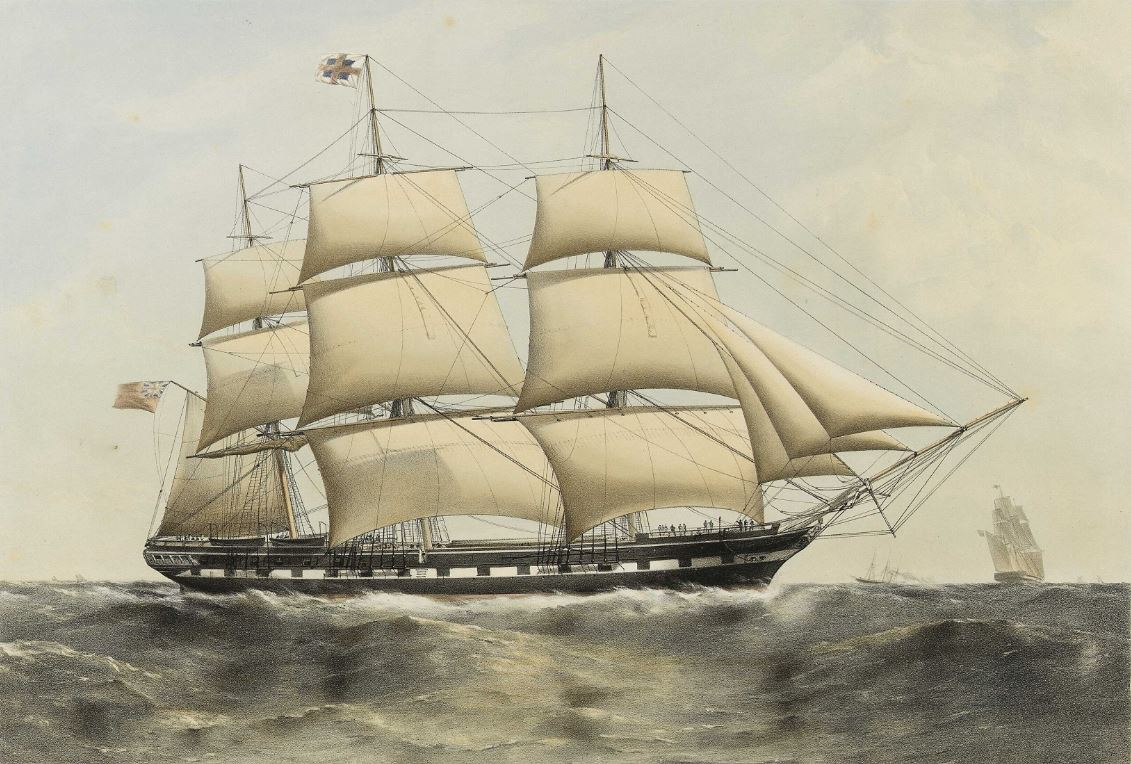
The clipper Newcastle in 1857

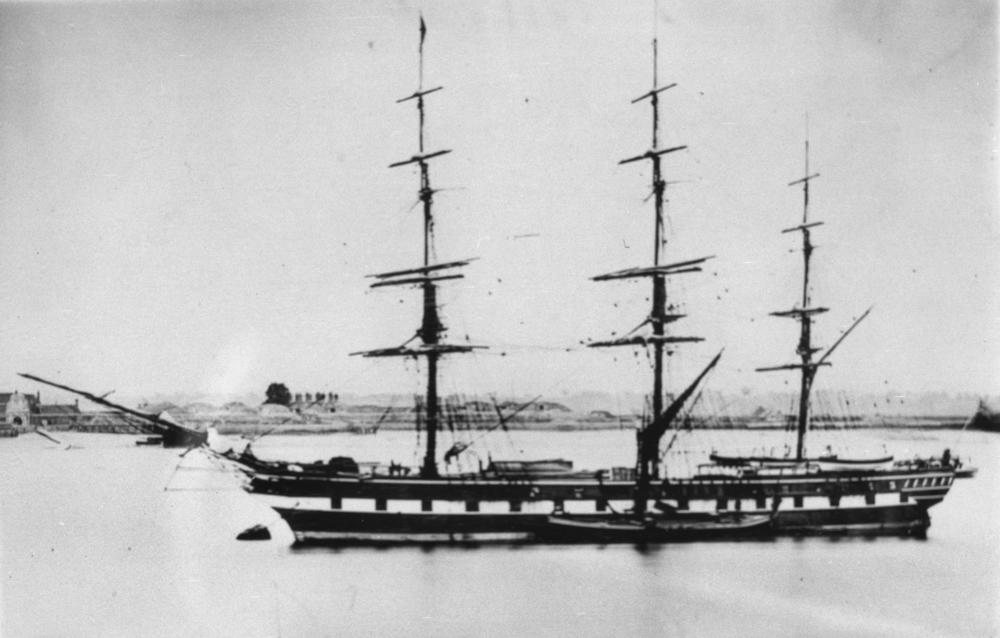
Newcastle in 1880

== Death ==
Dutton died, a widower, on 12 March 1891 at his home, in Lavender Gardens, Clapham Common in Wandsworth, London, England. He was buried on 17 March at the South Metropolitan cemetery, Norwood, South London.

== Collections ==
His works are in the following collections:

- The Royal Collection
- The National Maritime Museum, Greenwich
- Smithsonian National Museum of American History

== Gallery ==
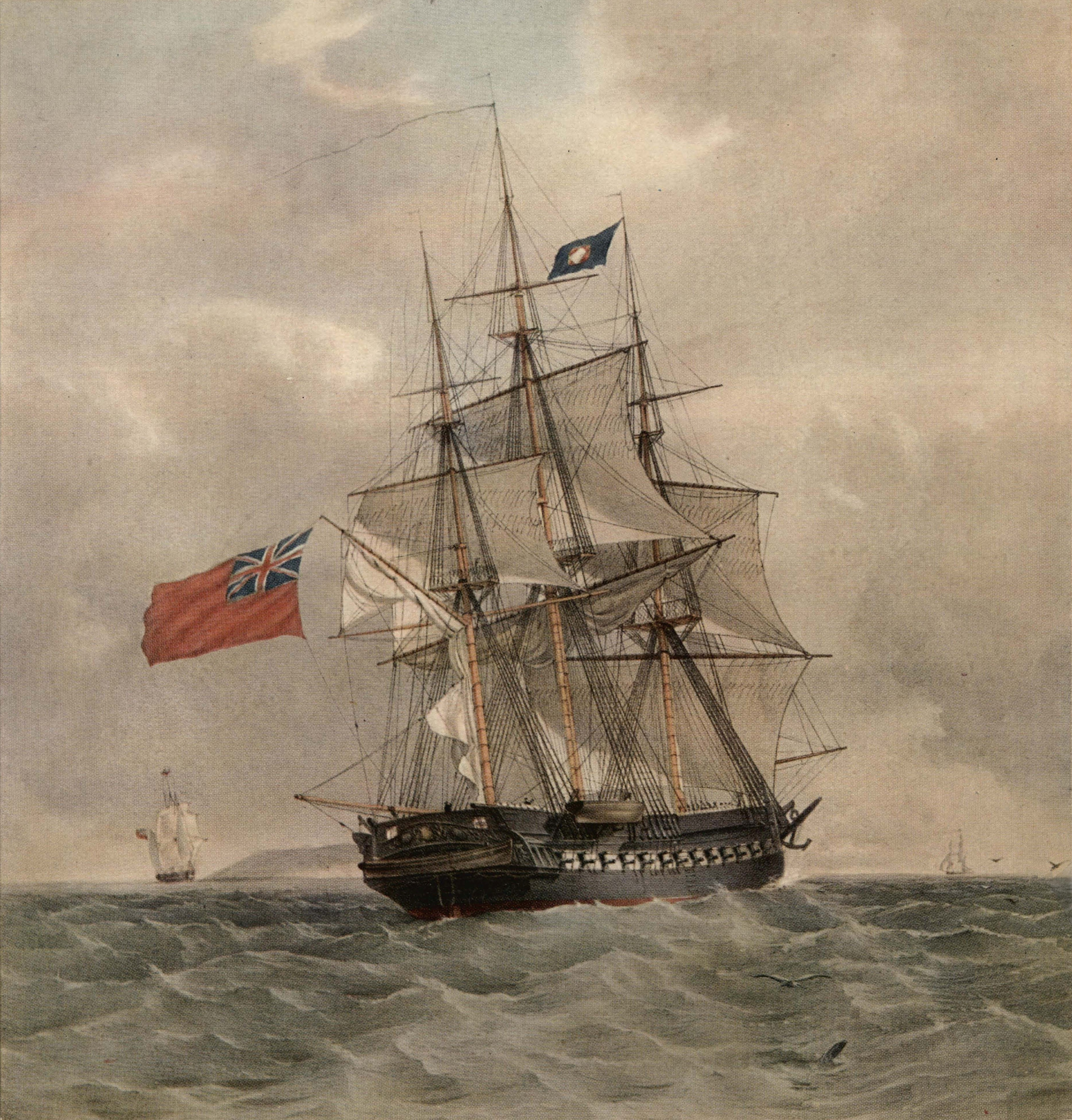
HMS Pomone

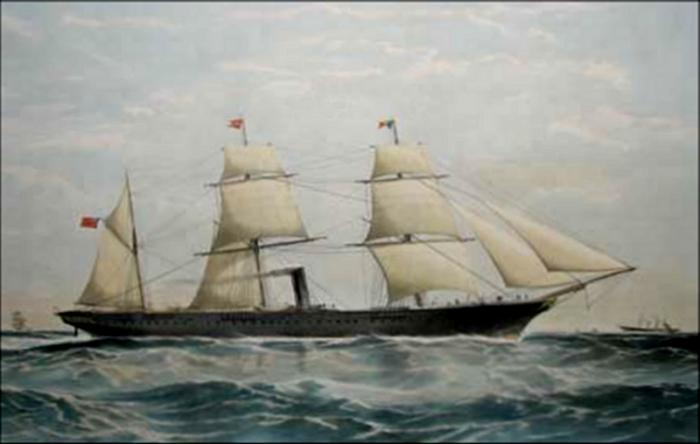
SS Mooltan

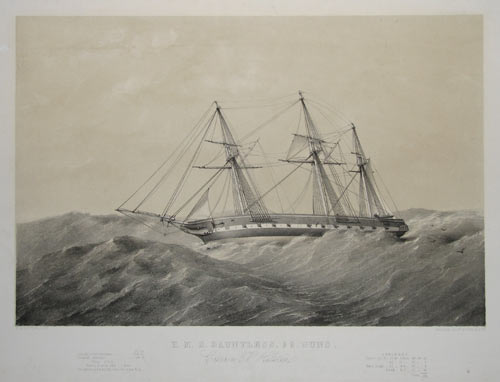
HMS Dauntless

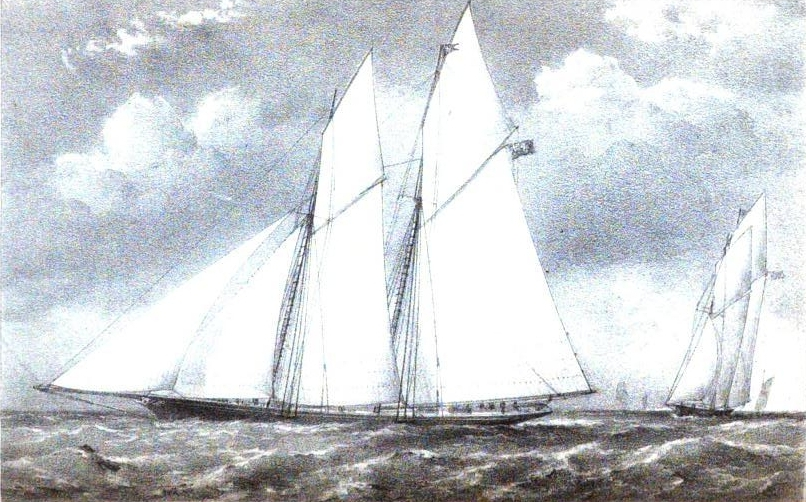
Livonia

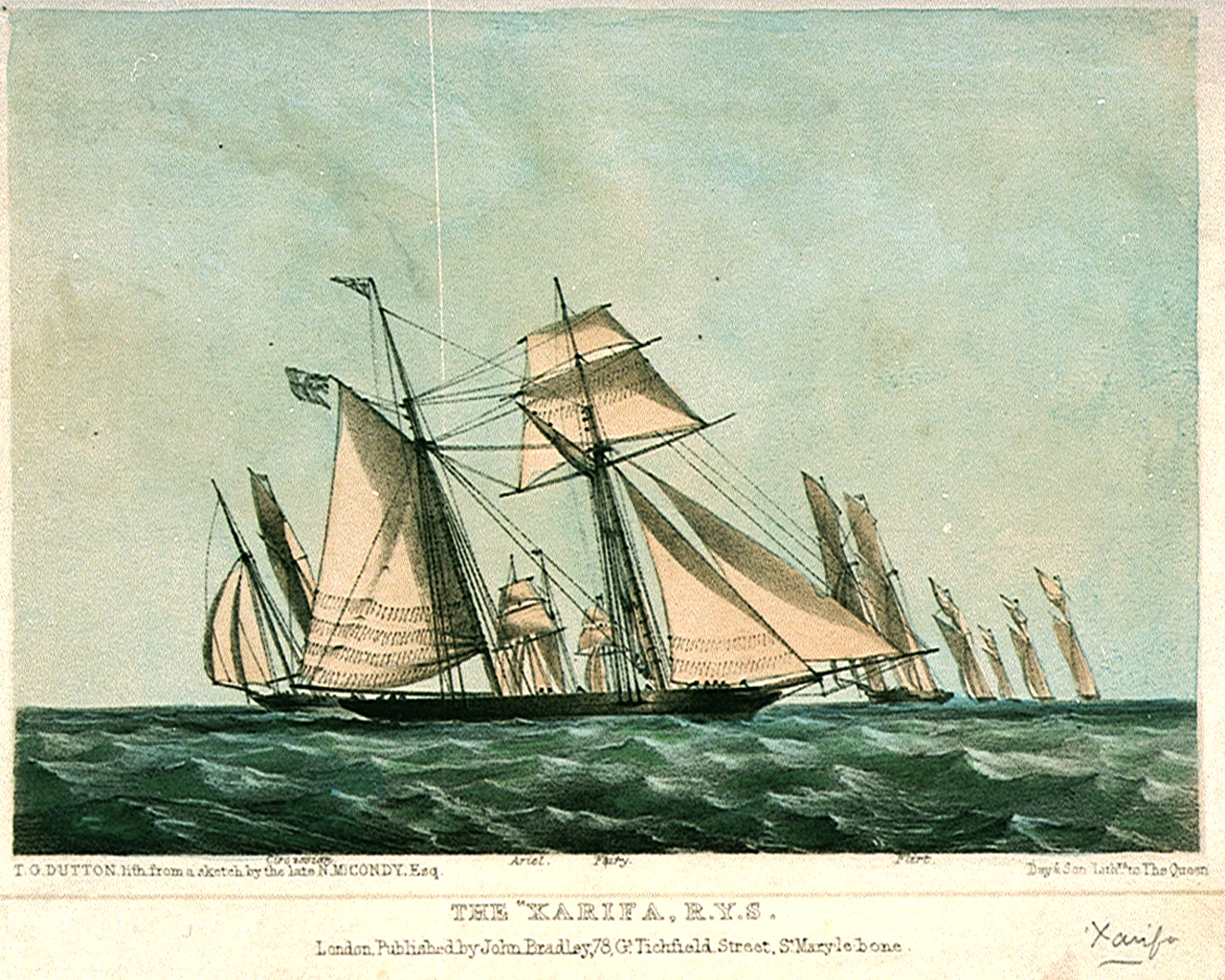
Yacht Xarifa

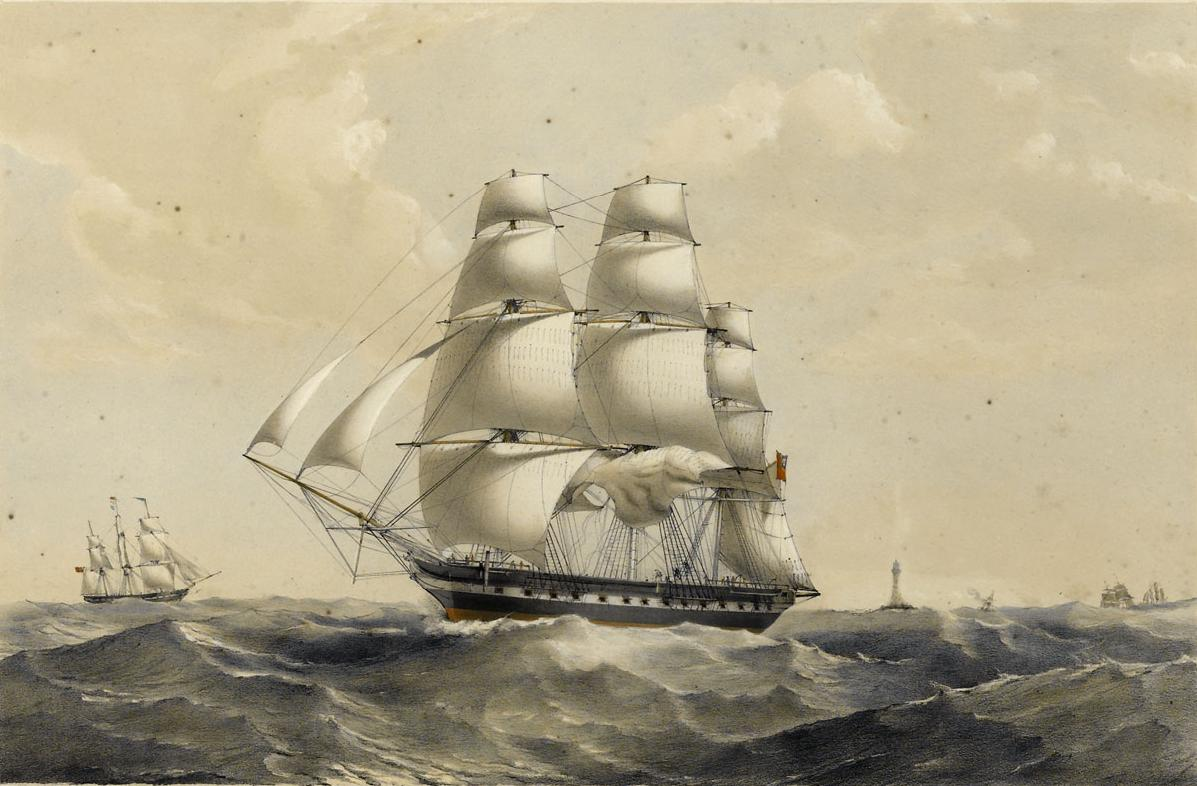
East Indiaman Madagascar

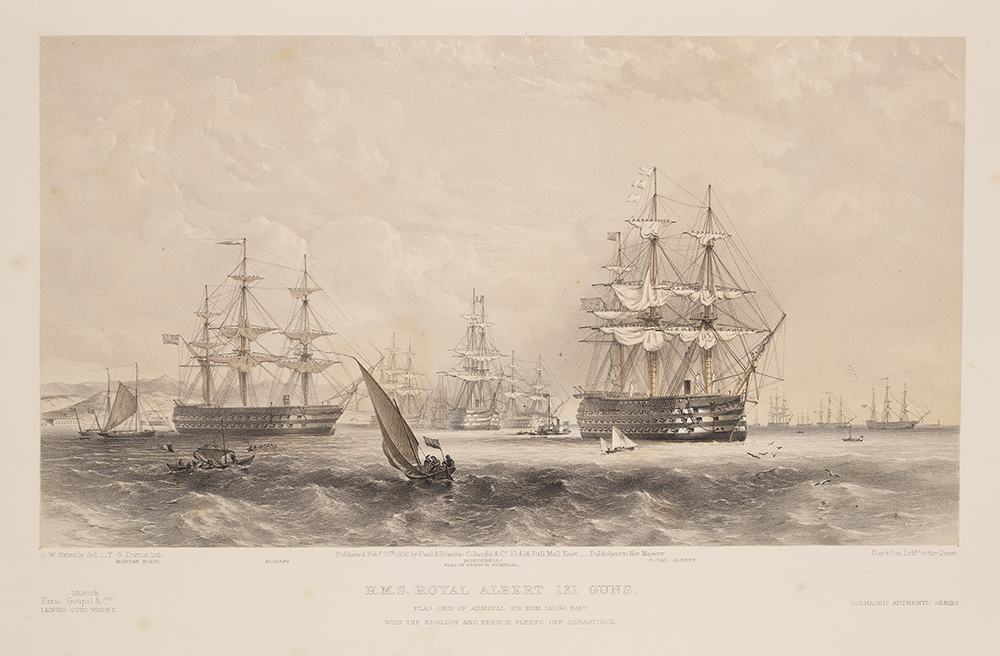
HMS Royal Albert

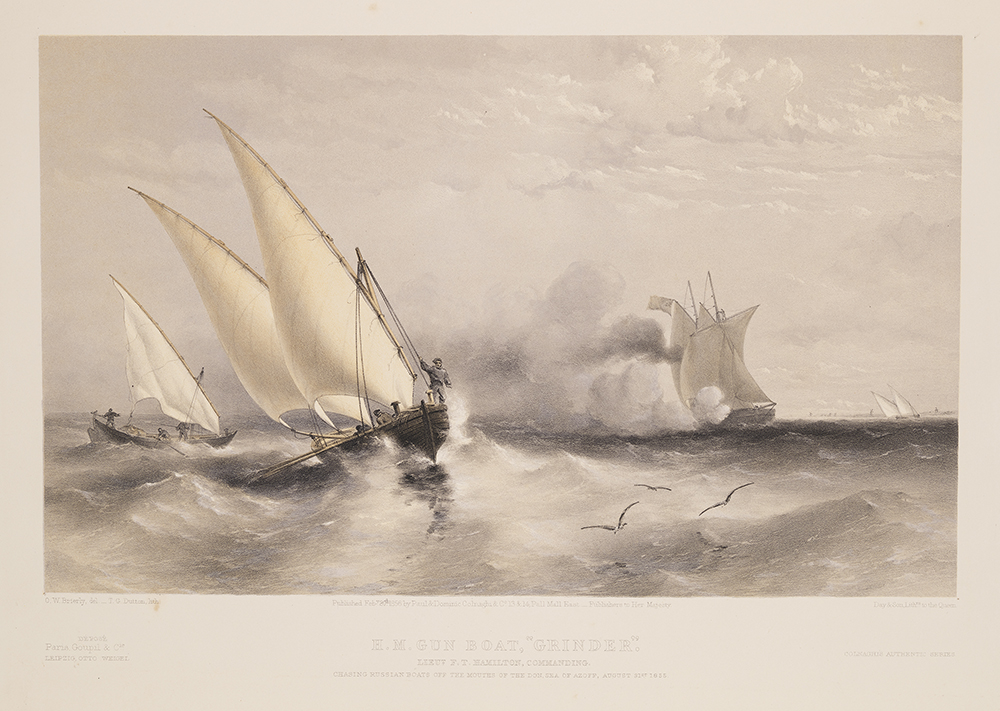
H.M. Gun Boat, 'Grinder'

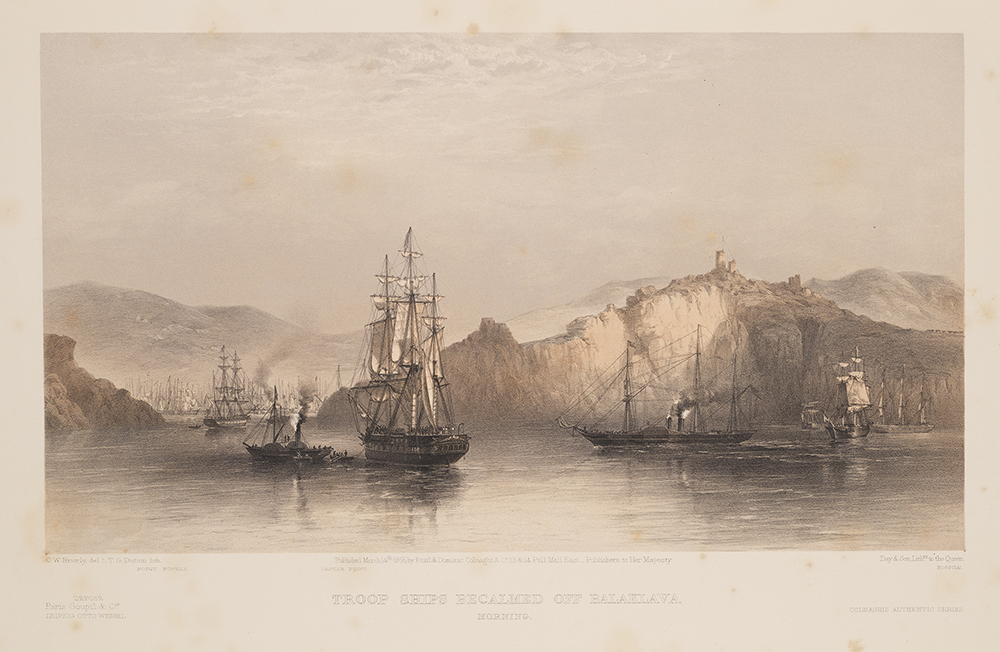
Troop Ships becalmed off Balaklava, Morning

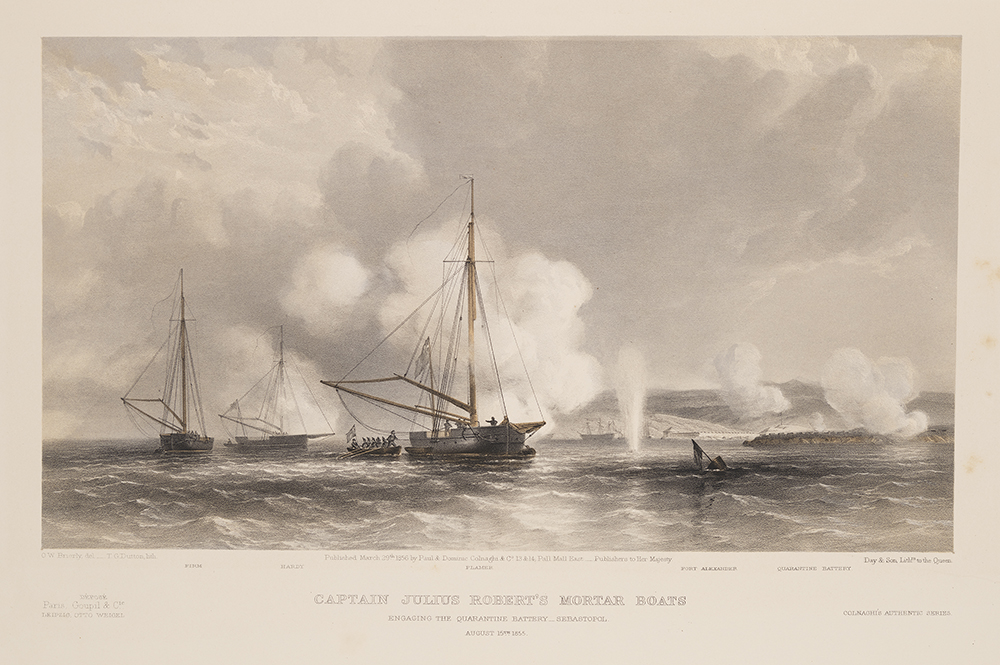
Captain Julius Robert's Mortar Boats

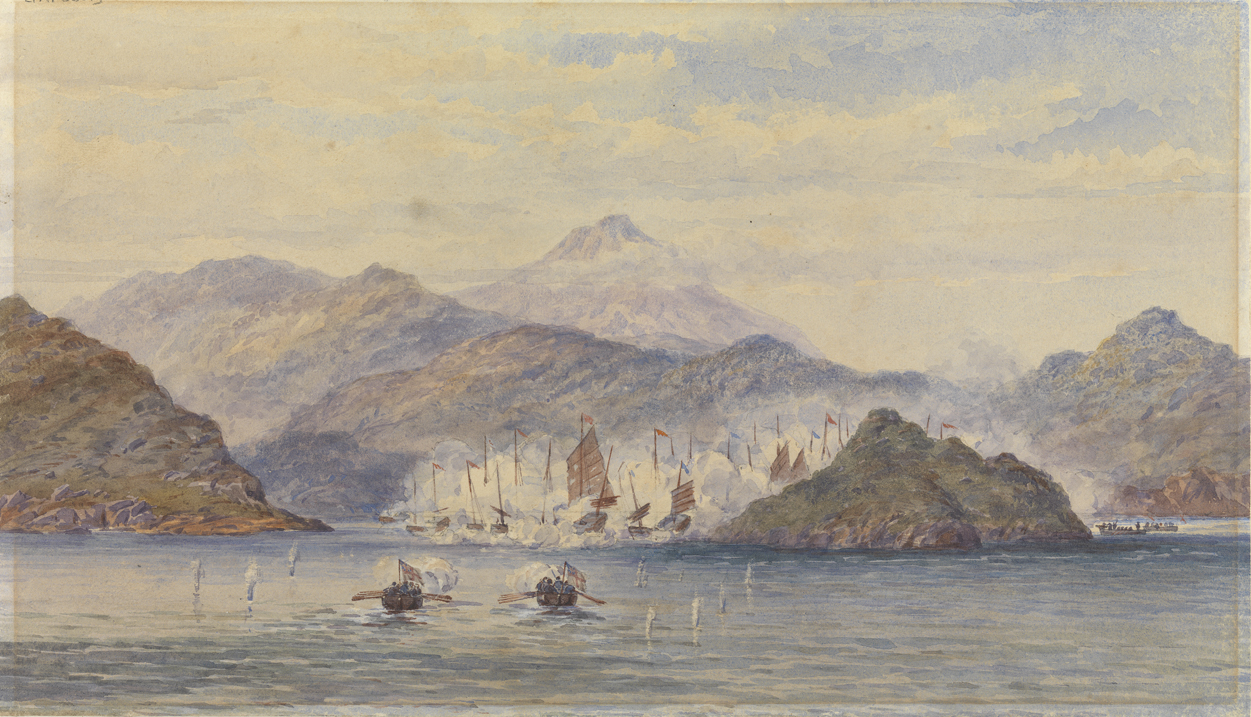
Boats approaching junks

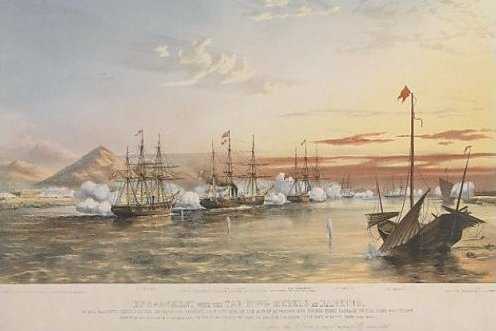
Engagement with the Tae-Ping rebels at Nanking

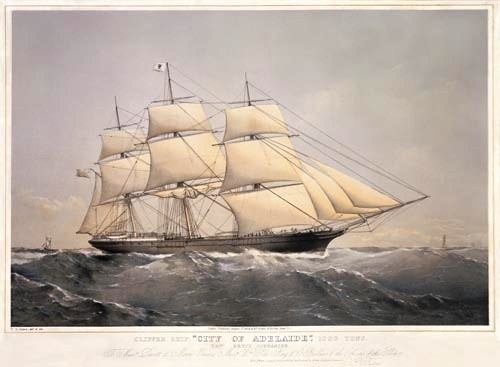
Clipper ship City of Adelaide

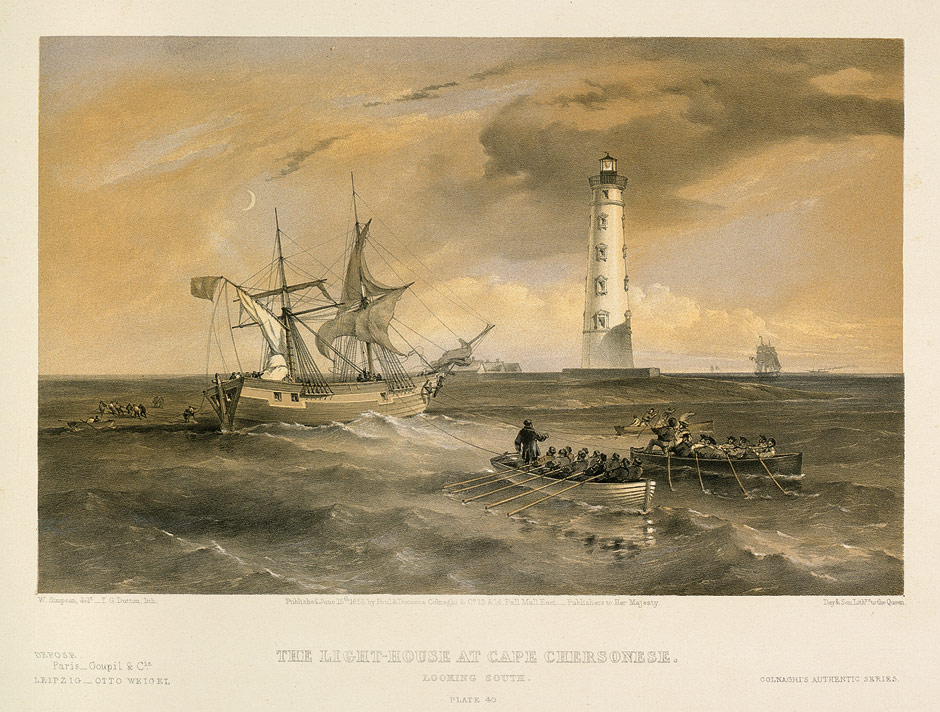
The light-house at Cape Chersonese looking South

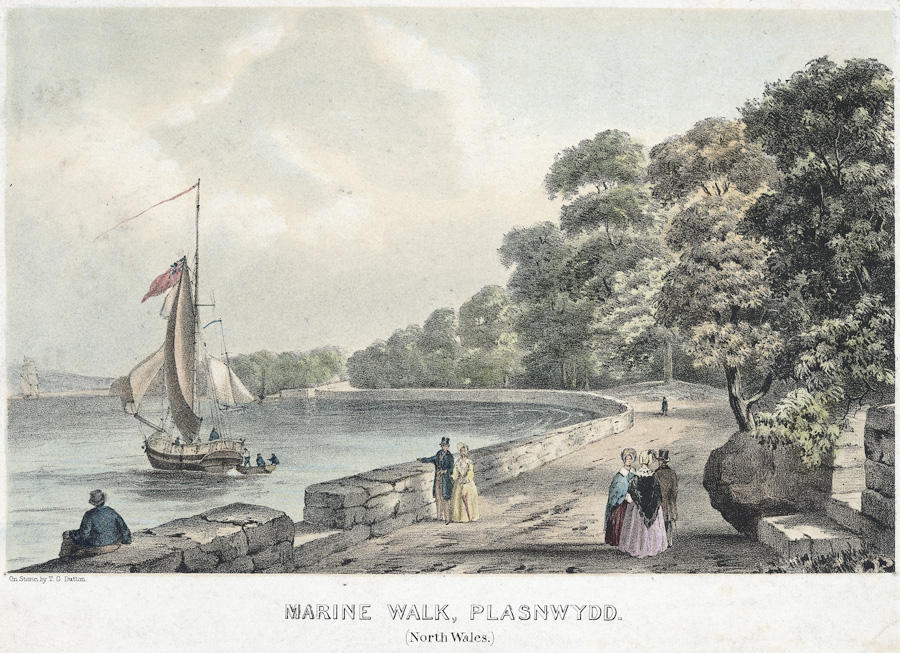
Marine walk, Plasnewydd (North Wales)

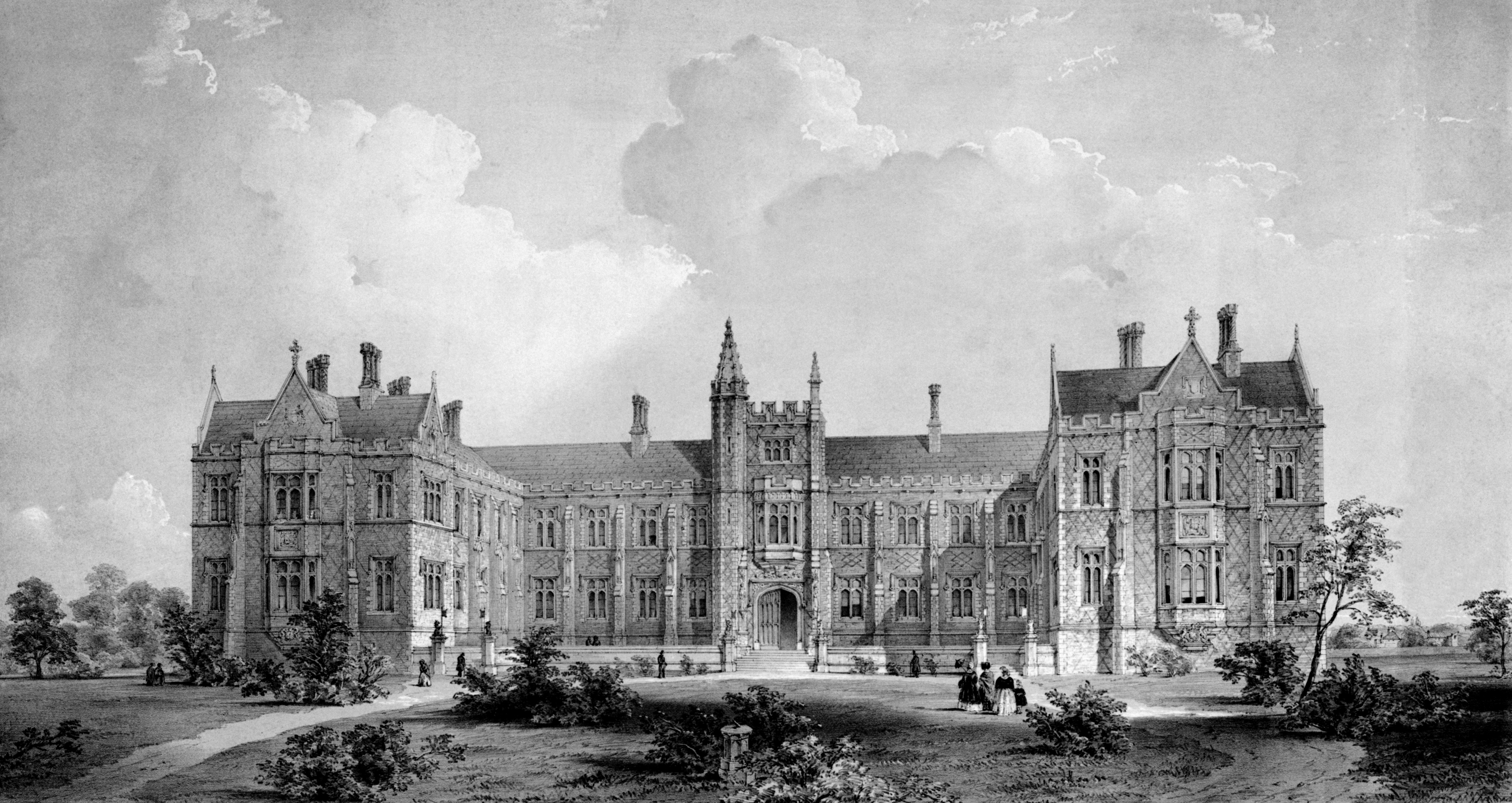
Brompton Hospital 1844
