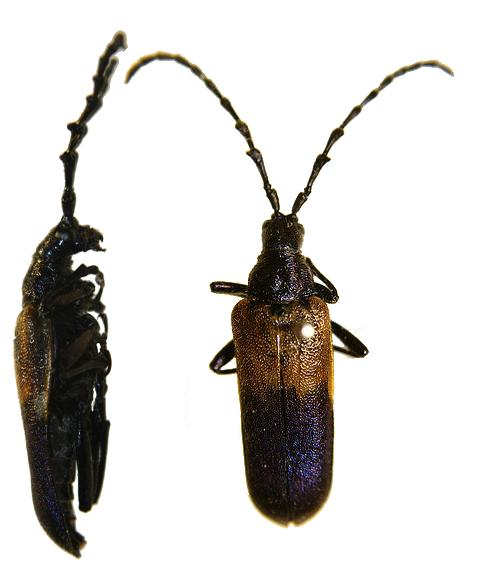

Scientific classification
- Kingdom: Animalia
- Phylum: Arthropoda
- Class: Insecta
- Order: Coleoptera
- Suborder: Polyphaga
- Infraorder: Cucujiformia
- Family: Cerambycidae
- Genus: Desmocerus
- Species: D. palliatus

Binomial name
- Desmocerus palliatus Forster (1771)

Synonyms
- Calopus blandus Fabricius, 1775; Cerambyx palliatus Forster, 1771; Desmocerus cyaneus (Fabricius) Audinet-Serville, 1834; Desmocerus elongatus Bland, 1862; Stenocorus cyaneus Fabricius, 1775

= Desmocerus palliatus =

Species of beetle

Desmocerus palliatus, the eastern elderberry borer, is a species of Cerambycidae that occurs in Eastern North America.

== Description ==
The adult is 17 to 26 mm, mostly a shimmering dark blue, and the bases of the elytra are yellow to yellow-red. It is likely a mimic of beetles in the family Lycidae, as is the moth Lycomorpha pholus found in the same area.

== Range and habitat ==
It ranges from Oklahoma, central North America, to parts of the southern Appalachian Mountains. They tend to be more abundant in the northern part of its range. They can be seen in swampy areas and near streams that support their host plant.

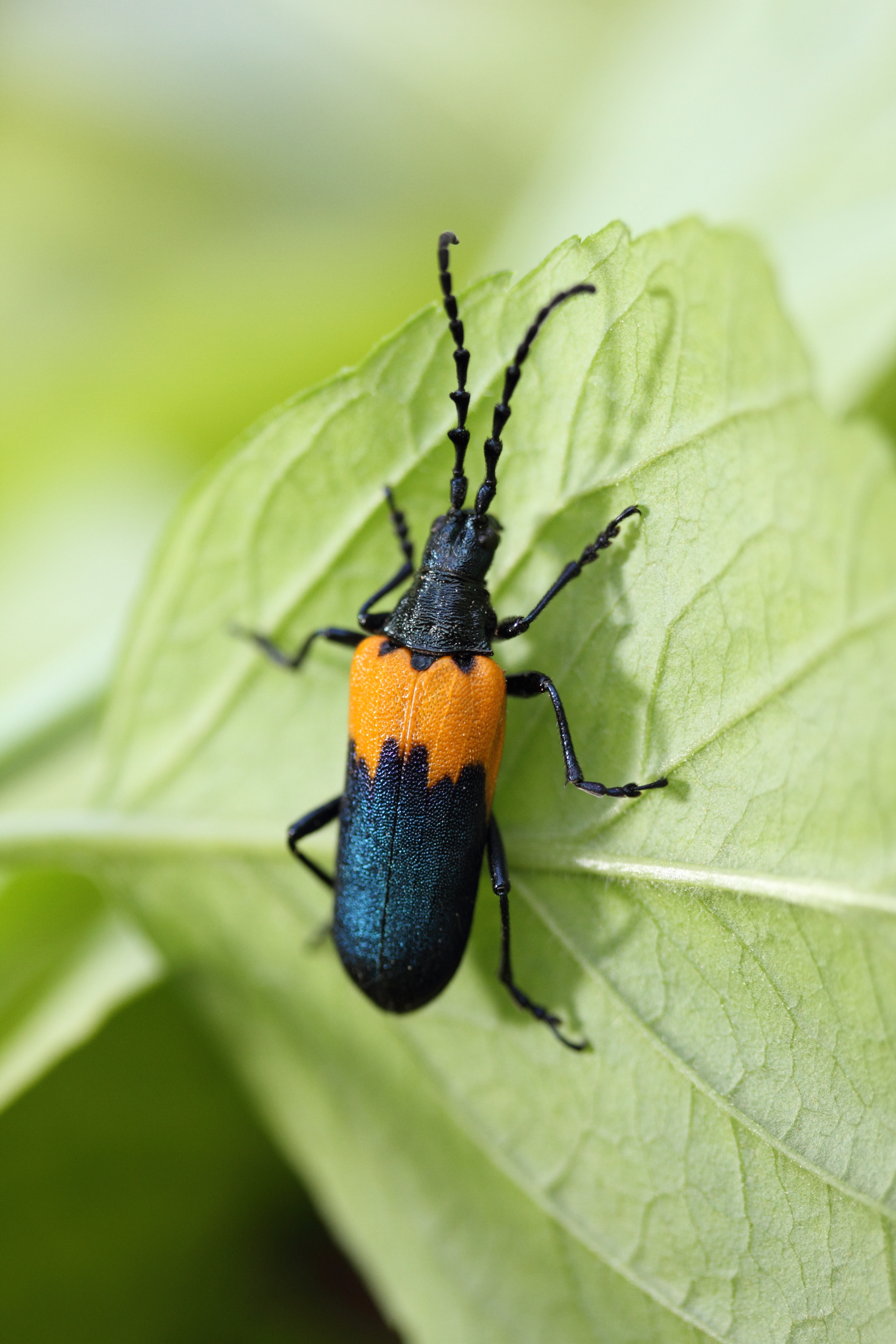
Live specimen of elderberry borer

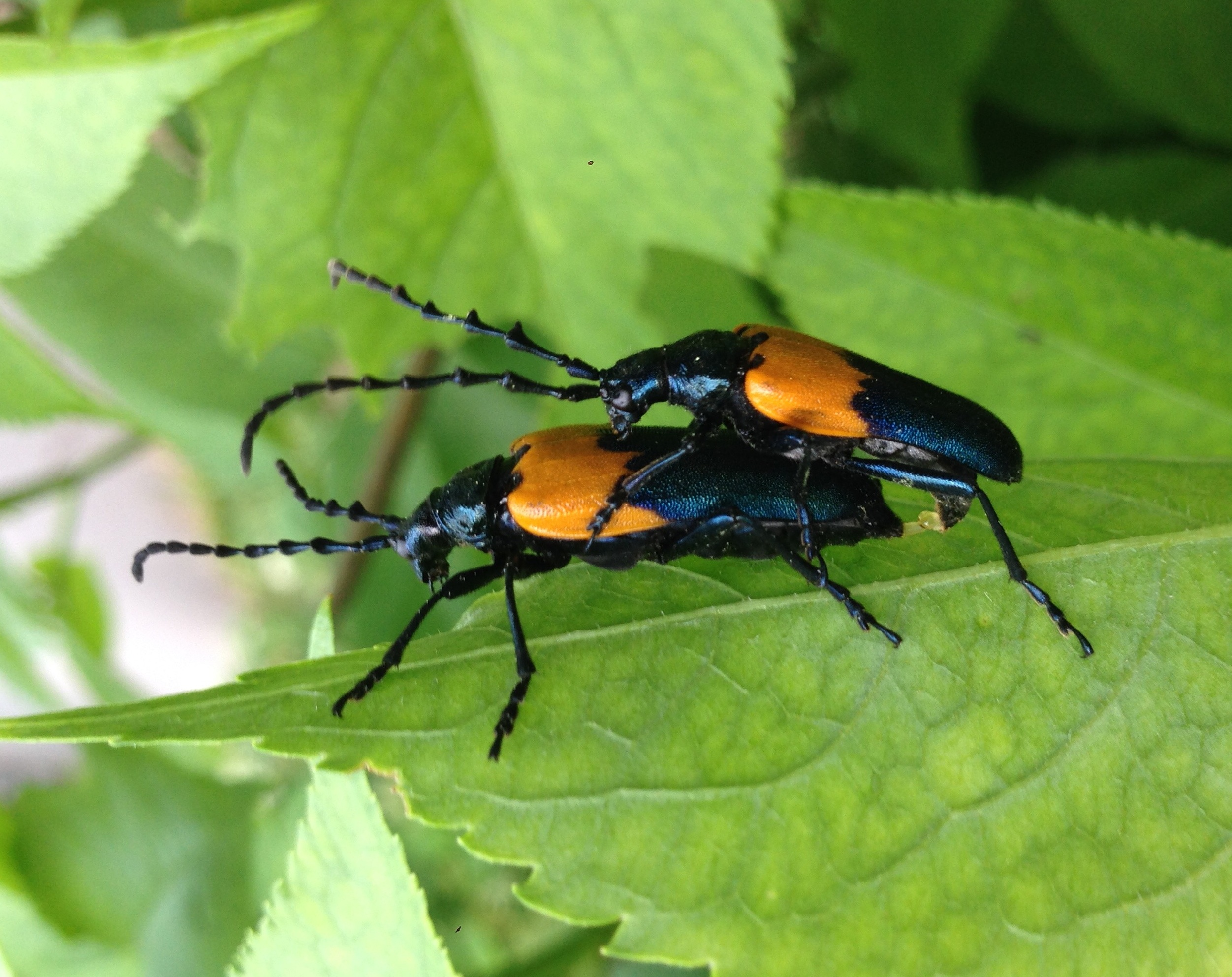
mating pair

== Life cycle ==
Eggs are laid near stems or at the base of the plant, the larvae then burrow their way into the stems and eat tunnels into the roots of the living plant. They can be seen between April and August.

Adult food

- Pollen

Sambucus
Larval food
Sambucus
