= Desmocerus aureipennis =

Scientific classification
- Kingdom: Animalia
- Phylum: Arthropoda
- Clade: Pancrustacea
- Class: Insecta
- Order: Coleoptera
- Suborder: Polyphaga
- Infraorder: Cucujiformia
- Family: Cerambycidae
- Genus: Desmocerus
- Species: D. aureipennis

Binomial name
- Desmocerus aureipennis Chevrolat, 1855

Species of beetle

Desmocerus aureipennis is a species of long-horned beetle in the subfamily Lepturinae. This species is distributed in United States and Canada.

== Subspecies ==
Four subspecies of Desmocerus aureipennis have been described:

- Desmocerus aureipennis aureipennis Chevrolat, 1855
- Desmocerus aureipennis cribripennis Horn, 1881
- Desmocerus aureipennis lacustris Linsley & Chemsak, 1972
- Desmocerus aureipennis piperi Webb, 1905
