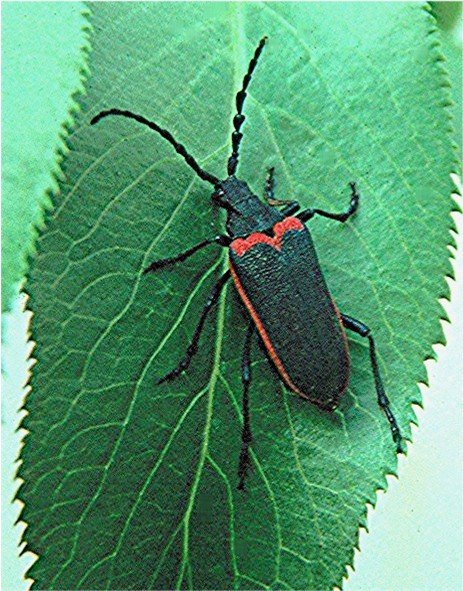
- Female valley elderberry longhorn beetle

Conservation status
- Imperiled (NatureServe)

- Threatened (ESA)

Scientific classification
- Kingdom: Animalia
- Phylum: Arthropoda
- Clade: Pancrustacea
- Class: Insecta
- Order: Coleoptera
- Suborder: Polyphaga
- Infraorder: Cucujiformia
- Family: Cerambycidae
- Genus: Desmocerus
- Species: D. californicus
- Subspecies: D. c. dimorphus

Trinomial name
- Desmocerus californicus dimorphus Fisher, 1921

= Valley elderberry longhorn beetle =

Subspecies of beetle

The valley elderberry longhorn beetle (Desmocerus californicus dimorphus) is a subspecies of the California elderberry borer and is longhorn beetle native to the riparian forests of the Central Valley of California from Redding to Bakersfield. It is listed as a federally threatened species; a proposal to delist the insect was withdrawn in 2014.

== Description ==
Valley elderberry longhorn beetles are stout-bodied. Males range in length from about 1.25–2.5 cm (½–1 in; measured from the front of the head to the end of the abdomen) with antennae about as long as their bodies. Females are slightly more robust than males, measuring about 1.9–2.5 cm (¾–1 in), with somewhat shorter antennae. The species is sexually dimorphic with adult males having red-orange elytra (wing covers) with four elongate spots and margins. The red-orange fades to yellow on some museum specimens. As for the adult females, they have a dark-colored metallic green to black elytra with reddish margins.

The four stages in the animal's life are: egg, larva, pupa, and adult. The species is nearly always found on or close to its host plant, elderberry (Sambucus species). Adults appear from the pith of elderberry at the start of the species' mating season in the spring, as the shrub begins to bloom. They feed on the leaf foliage, flowers, and nectar of the host plant before reproducing, and are active from March to June; this interval coincides with the blooming period of elderberry shrubs. In this period, the beetles mate and the females lay their eggs on the bark of living elderberry plants. The newly hatched larvae, or instar, burrow into the stems. The larval stage may last up to 1 to 2 years, in which they feed upon the pith as they grow. Before the pupal stage, the larvae bore exit holes through the surface, then sealing them with wood shavings. After which the larvae enter the pupal stage, returning to their chambers to undergo metamorphosis, later transforming into adults. These adult beetles have a short lifespan, typically ranging from a few days to a few weeks once they emerge from the shrub and rarely live past 3 months.

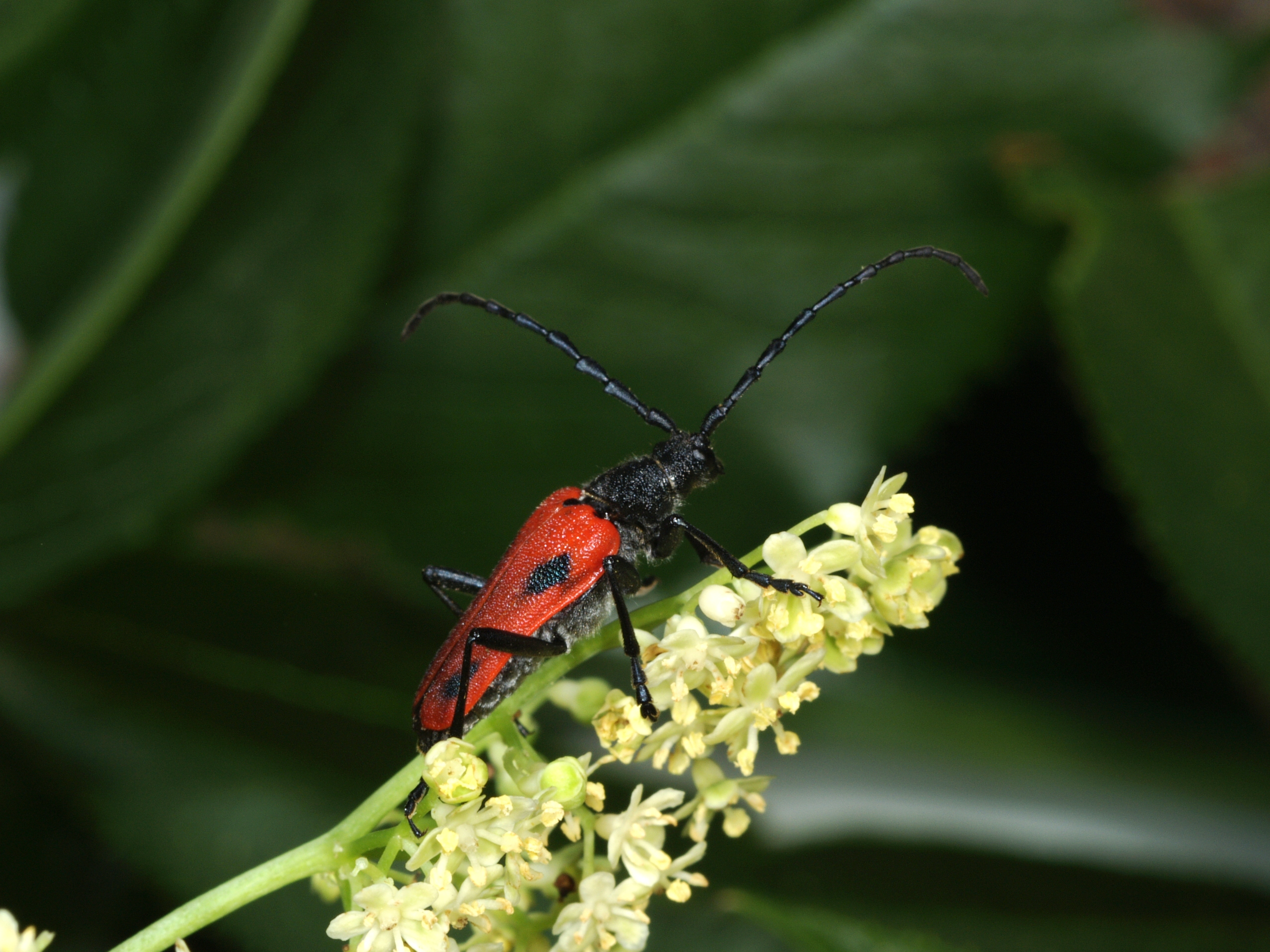
Male valley elderberry longhorn beetle

To serve as habitat, the shrubs apparently must have stems 2.5 cm (1 in) or greater in diameter at ground level. Use of the plants by the animal is rarely apparent. Frequently, the only exterior evidence of the shrub's use by the beetle is an exit hole created by the larva just before the pupal stage. Field work along the Cosumnes River and in the Folsom Lake area suggests that larval galleries can be found in elderberry stems with no evidence of exit holes. The larvae either succumb before constructing an exit hole or are not far enough along in the developmental process to construct one.

Males of the valley elderberry longhorn beetle are attracted to (R)-desmolactone, a chemical compound which functions as a sex pheromone or sex attractant for multiple species and subspecies in the cerambycid genus Desmocerus. The compound may be used as a lure for efficient monitoring of the valley elderberry longhorn beetle.

== Critical habitat ==
1. Sacramento Zone — An area in the city of Sacramento enclosed on the north by the Route 160 Freeway, on the west and southwest by the Western Pacific railroad tracks, and on the east by Commerce Circle and its extension southward to the railroad tracks
2. American River Parkway Zone — An area of the American River Parkway on the south bank of the American River, bounded on the north by latitude 38 37'30" N, and on the South and east by Ambassador Drive and its extension north to latitude 38 37'30" N, River Bend Park, and that portion of the American River Parkway northeast of River Bend Park, west of the Jedediah Smith Memorial Bicycle Trail, and north to a line extended eastward from Palm Drive
3. O'Connor Lakes Riparian restoration zone sponsored by California's Department of Fish and Game and the wildlife conservation board Location: Sutter and Yuba Counties - 10 miles south of Marysville and Yuba City on the Feather River. Access: Access gained from Star Bend fishing access on Feather River Blvd

== Special considerations ==
Extensive destruction of California's Central Valley riparian forests has occurred during the last 150 years due to agricultural and urban development. According to some estimates, riparian forest in the Central Valley has declined by as much as 89% during that time. The valley elderberry longhorn beetle, though wide-ranging, is in long-term decline due to human activities that have resulted in widespread alteration and fragmentation of riparian habitats, and to a lesser extent, upland habitats, which support the beetle.

The primary threats to survival of the beetle include:

- loss and alteration of habitat by agricultural conversion
- inappropriate grazing
- levee construction, stream and river channelization, removal of riparian vegetation and rip-rapping of shoreline
- predators such as lizards, birds, and nonnative insects like the European earwig and Argentine ant, in which these species feed on the beetle throughout various stages of its life cycle
- recreational, industrial and urban development

Insecticide and herbicide use in agricultural areas and along road rights-of-way may be factors limiting the beetle's distribution. The age and quality of individual elderberry shrubs/trees and stands as a food plant for beetle may also be a factor in its limited distribution.

== Management and conservation ==
Westervelt Ecological Services and the U.S. Fish and Wildlife Services would approve two conservation banks for the Valley Elderberry Longhorn Beetle on June 19, 2025. These would be located in Colusa County. Two additional previously approved conservation banks projects were located along the Sacramento River, being the Sacramento Valley Elderberry Longhorn Beetle in March, 2025 and Harmony Conservation Bank in May 2025. Restoration has consisted of planting shrubs along with other native plants that host the Valley Elderberry Longhorn Beetle. In 2017 the U.S Fish and Wildlife Services put in place regulations for elderberry shrubs with stems larger than 1 inch in diameter not being able to be removed, and trimming of stems smaller than 1 inch in diameter only being allowed between November and February. These regulations apply only to the Central Valley range where the Valley Elderberry Longhorn Beetle.
