= Bushy Islet =

- Location within Queensland
- Location: Queensland
- Coordinates: 11°15′S 142°52′E

Bushy Islet is a one-mile-long islet in Queensland, Australia about 9.5 miles (15.3 km) from Woody Island and 3.5 miles (5.6 km) from Quoin Island in the Great Barrier Reef Marine Park of Queensland, Australia. It is approximately 3 miles (5 km) west of Cairncross Island.

Bushy Islet is part of Macarthur Islands.

== See also ==
- List of islands of Australia
