= Bushy Lake =

Lake in Sacramento, California, United States

- Location within California
- Location: Sacramento, California
- Coordinates: 38°35′20″N 121°26′04″W

Bushy Lake is a small lake located in Sacramento, California along the American River Parkway. The area is part of an ongoing restoration project, it also provides habitat to wildlife and offers nearby recreation opportunities. The area is prone to drought, erosion, species invasion, fire, and groups of transient populations. In the American River Parkway Plan, the lake is designated as a Nature Study Area and further protected by the Bushy Lake Preservation Act.

== Location ==
Bushy Lake is a small lake located in the American River Parkway at 38.5889279°N, 121.4345277°W. It is behind the southeast corner of Cal Expo in the city and county of Sacramento, California, in the United States. The lake is located just off a trail, half a mile from the parking area near Gate 12 of Cal Expo and 700 meters from the American River.

== History ==
In the 1940s the State of California acquired the undeveloped land near Cal Expo that Bushy Lake is a part of, although the land now belongs to Cal Expo. A structure was built in the 1960s, followed by development for a golf course. To prepare for the golf course, the structure of the depression that forms Bushy Lake was changed and compacted, altering its shape and bathymetry. The development of the Golf Course was halted by efforts from the Save the American River Association and support of the Bushy Lake Preservation Act, with the intent of protecting the remaining riparian area. The work on the golf course stopped when the act was passed in 1976, today the land is currently owned by Cal Expo and managed by Sacramento County parks.

Historically the area surrounding Bushy Lake, which is in the floodplain of the American River, would accommodate the natural meandering of the river. Since the construction of Folsom Dam, flow into the lower American River has been controlled. Because of this controlled release, the river no longer reaches its historic floodplains. Today the water in Bushy Lake is supplied by groundwater pumped from Cal Expo, in accordance with the Bushy Lake Preservation Act.

California's Mediterranean climate, consisting of cool, wet winters and warm, dry summers is also connected to drought conditions, which cause many locations in California to be prone to fire. Bushy Lake is no different, In the summer of 2014, 160 acres of land surrounding Bushy Lake burned in a wildfire. There was another fire in the area in 2016. One of the main objectives of the current restoration project is to develop a fire resilient understory.

=== Bushy Lake Preservation Act and AB 889 ===
The Bushy Lake Preservation Act was enacted in 1976 and the primary intent of the act was to support the ecosystems in the area by supporting the habitat of flora and fauna. The Bushy Lake Preservation Act is a legislative act that requires the flood plains to be maintained and preserved for public use and enjoyment. Assembly Bill 889 makes amendments to the Bushy Lake Preservation Act by expanding on some of the requirements of the original act. The California Exposition and State Fair Board of Directors are required to maintain and preserve Bushy Lake and the Cal Expo floodplains in a way that is consistent with what a state park and natural preserve are. Assembly Bill 889 also requires that the preservation and management of Bushy Lake and the flood plains of Cal Expo conform to the standards and regulations of the American River Parkway Plan. The Bushy Lake Preservation Act also only allows that parking is to be permitted during the time of the State Fair and only on specified land, however, AB 889 requires one acre of land to be designated at all times for public use as long as cars are not parked there for more than 34 days. In addition, AB 889 requires that about 11 acres of land to be specifically for the use of parking near the flood plains so that more of the public can have access.

== The Bushy Lake Restoration Project ==
The Environmental Studies department at CSUS has an ongoing restoration project that aims to restore the riparian habitat of Bushy Lake . The Bushy Lake Restoration Project is a long-term collaborative education project between the CSUS Environmental Studies Department and the Sacramento County Parks Department. The project was initiated at the Ecological Society of America Conference in Sacramento by multiple organizations including Yale, University of California, Davis, Sacramento County Parks, and the American River Parkway Foundation in August 2014. The goals of the project are to restore fire resilient and drought resistant native plants to the area, to restore habitat for local native animals, as well as provide environmental educational opportunities for the public.

=== Plant survival research ===
One of the main objectives of the restoration project is to develop a fire resilient understory. To accomplish this, research must be done to determine best planting and propagation practices for the site. Research has been done on two fire resilient species- Santa Barbara sedge (Carex barbarae) and creeping wild rye (Leymus triticoides) regarding planting densities, which showed that the low-density plantings were more cost effective and that these plants survive better when planted separately. Ongoing research of understory vegetation working as an umbrella species and companion planting is underway.

=== Western pond turtle research ===
Western pond turtles and Red-eared sliders have both been identified as residing in Bushy Lake. In 2017 the number of Western pond turtles was greater than the number of red-eared sliders, which only accounted for 10% of recorded sightings. The red-eared slider is an invasive species that competes with the western pond turtle for basking sites and food resources. Counts from 2018 suggest that there are now more red-eared sliders in the lake than Western pond turtles. Further plans to remove and relocate the red-eared sliders to a sanctuary and tag the Western pond turtles are underway.

=== Bird sampling ===
Bird sampling at Bushy Lake is done using a point bird count method, consisting of being in designated areas for 15 minutes and recording and identifying what birds are seen or heard. Counts have been used to compile lists of avian species using the site for breeding purposes, foraging, or just passing by. The counts are on-going, in an effort to determine what species use the site year-round.

=== Valley elderberry longhorn beetle monitoring ===
The valley elderberry longhorn beetle is a threatened species known to be found in elderberry trees along the American River. Bushy Lake and the surrounding area contain several elderberry trees that have been marked and checked for the beetle's exit holes. When exit holes are found it indicates the presence of the beetle in that tree. The monitoring process has not resulted in any confirmed sightings or new exit holes from the valley elderberry longhorn beetles.

== Flora and fauna ==
Wildlife spotted at Bushy Lake include:the western pond turtle, North American River Otter, red tailed hawks, Valley Elderberry Longhorn Beetles, the Willow Flycatcher, and many other bird species.

Bushy Lake is a wetland riparian plant community. As a result of different stressors, such as fire and drought, there has been an increase in the biomass of invasive species in the area that prosper in drought-like conditions. A vegetation survey of the area revealed native and non-native species present at Bushy Lake, 52% are native to the area and include trees, bushes, and herbaceous understory including: beardless wild rye (Elymus triticoides) and Santa Barbara sedge (Carex barbarae), elderberry (Sambucus Mexicana), coyote brush (Baccharis pilularis), California blackberry (Rubus ursinus), California grape (Vitis californica), sandbar willow (Salix exigua), arroyo willow (Salix lasiolepis), Goodding's willow (Salix gooddingii), box elder (Acer negundo), and Fremont's cottonwood (Populus fremontii). 48% of the species found are non-native, of that 48%, 39% are invasive species such as: Himalayan blackberry (Rubus armeniacus), poison hemlock (Conium maculatum), and prickly lettuce (Lactuca serriola).

Invasive species crowd out the native plant species, making it harder for the natives to get the resources they need; this negatively effects the biodiversity of Bushy Lake.

== Recreation ==
Bushy Lake is located near the American River Bike Trail. There are also fishing opportunities both in the lake and in the nearby American River. People who fish are asked to submit reviews about the fish and wildlife that they encounter. This area is used for bird watching, bike riding, equestrian riding, hiking, and picnicking in addition to accessing the river. Bushy Lake also offers organized volunteer opportunities that include weeding and prepping sites for future research.
