= Bushy-crested =

Bushy-crested may refer to:

- Bushy-crested hornbill, a species of hornbill in the family Bucerotidae
- Bushy-crested jay, a species of bird in the family Corvidae
