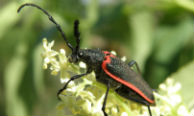
- Desmocerus californicus

Scientific classification
- Kingdom: Animalia
- Phylum: Arthropoda
- Class: Insecta
- Order: Coleoptera
- Suborder: Polyphaga
- Infraorder: Cucujiformia
- Family: Cerambycidae
- Subfamily: Lepturinae
- Tribe: Desmocerini; Blanchard, 1845
- Genus: Desmocerus; Dejean, 1821

= Desmocerus =

Genus of beetles

Desmocerus, the elderberry borers, is a genus of beetles in the family Cerambycidae, containing the following species:

- Desmocerus aureipennis Chevrolat, 1855
- Desmocerus californicus Horn, 1881
- Desmocerus palliatus (Forster, 1771)
