= Bushy Island =

- other
- Coordinates: 20°57′S 150°05′E
- Country: Australia
- State: Queensland

Bushy Island is a vegetated coral cay in Queensland, Australia in the Great Barrier Reef Marine Park Queensland, Australia. It is about 70 km east of Mackay. There are no other vegetated cays in the more than 600 km stretch between Bushy Island and Green Island. The coral species Acropora bushyensis, one of many species in the genus Acropora, is most heavily concentrated in Bushy Island lagoon, existing only rarely elsewhere in the eastern portion of the Great Barrier Reef and not at all in the western portion. The island is an accumulation of biogenic sediment similar to Heron Island, and it has been sufficiently stable to accumulate vegetation. A major component of the mobile sands of Bushy Island is Foraminifera, a type of amoeboid protist. Foraminiferan sands are more easily eroded off of the cay. Bushy Island is located inside the zero isobase on an elevated reef flat, onto which the cay often erodes.
