= Macarthur Islands (Queensland) =

Islands in Queensland, Australia

- Interactive map of Macarthur Islands

Geography
- Location: Northern Australia

Administration
- Australia
- State: Queensland

Macarthur Islands are small islands in Shelburne Bay in far north Queensland, Australia a few hundred met1.738. It is around 48 hectares or 0.48 square km in size.
