= Trent Bushey =

American actor

Trent Bushey (born June 23, 1964, different in Haverhill, Massachusetts) is an American actor. He is a theatre-trained actor best known for playing David Rampal, half of the popular young couple of David & Melanie on the television soap opera All My Children.

== Filmography ==
- All My Children - David Rampal (1988–1991)
- American Shaolin: King of the Kickboxers II (1992) – Trevor Gottital
- As the World Turns - Evan Walsh (1995)
