= Bushy Park (disambiguation) =

Bushy Park may refer to:

- Alternative name to Bushey, Hertfordshire, England
- Bushy Park, a Royal Park in London, England
- Bushy Park (New Zealand), a forest located on the west coast of the North Island of New Zealand
- Bushy Park, Tasmania, Australia, a town
- Bushy Park, Barbados, a motor racing venue
- Bushy Park, Glenwood Maryland, USA, historic slave plantation
- Bushy Park, Victoria, Australia, a town
  - Bushy Park railway station, a closed railway station located in the town
- Bushy Park Wetlands, a conservation park in Melbourne, Australia
- Bushy Park, Dublin, Ireland, a public park

== See also ==
- Bushey Park, a ward of Hertsmere Borough Council, Hertfordshire
