= Bushie =

A Bushie, or less commonly, Bushite or Bushy, is a term referring to a political supporter of George H. W. Bush or George W. Bush. More specifically, it is used to denote the inner circle of Bush advisors, appointees, and acolytes. The label carries much the same meaning as the terms "Reaganite", "Clintonista", and “Obamabot”, which are used to denote aides and followers of Presidents Ronald Reagan, Bill Clinton, and Barack Obama respectively.

== History ==
Although the term has a longer recorded usage, it first came to prominence with the John Podhoretz's 1993 book, Hell of a Ride, about his experiences working for the George H. W. Bush White House. According to reviewer Jonathan Yardley of The Washington Post,

A Bushie is defined by Podhoretz as "someone either directly beholden to [George Herbert Walker Bush] or someone to whom Bush was directly beholden," someone who could prove himself to interviewers in the Bush job- appointments team as having "Bush experience," meaning not "general Republican experience, perhaps working on a Senate race in Idaho or something, but ... Bush experience solely."

The term was also defined by David Brooks in a review of the 2001 book Reagan In His Own Hand: The Writings of Ronald Reagan That Reveal His Revolutionary Vision for America. Brooks differentiated Reaganites and Bushies as types of Republicans. While Reaganites were often Hayekian academics connected to think tanks, Bushies tended to be "boring" corporate careerists with "neat desks and thin briefcases because their reading comes in the form of memos", who saw themselves as "master managers" and politics as a "competition of interests" rather than ideas. Although Brooks acknowledged that both groups were skeptical of government, their skepticism took different forms, with the Reaganites viewing the Bushies as skilled at political or bureaucratic wrangling, but lacking principles. According to Brooks, the failure of the Bushies in the first two years of the elder Bush administration, which led to major losses in the 1992 Congressional elections, brought about the ascendancy of "ideologues" such as Newt Gingrich and Dick Armey, but their "uncompromising" approach once again returned the reins of the party to the Bushies by the 2000 election, in which George W. Bush was elected.

The term became prominent during the investigation of the controversial replacement of several U.S. Attorneys when it was revealed that Justice Department official Kyle Sampson suggested in an e-mail to then-Attorney General John Ashcroft that

we would like to replace 15-20 percent of the current U.S. Attorneys -- the underperforming ones . . . The vast majority of U.S. Attorneys, 80-85 percent, I would guess, are doing a great job, are loyal Bushies, etc., etc."

According to Senate Majority Leader Harry Reid, a Democrat,

The real question is whether being a "loyal Bushie" meant letting partisan considerations poison law enforcement decisions.... The actions of the Bush Administration call into question every decision by federal prosecutors in corruption cases across the country.
