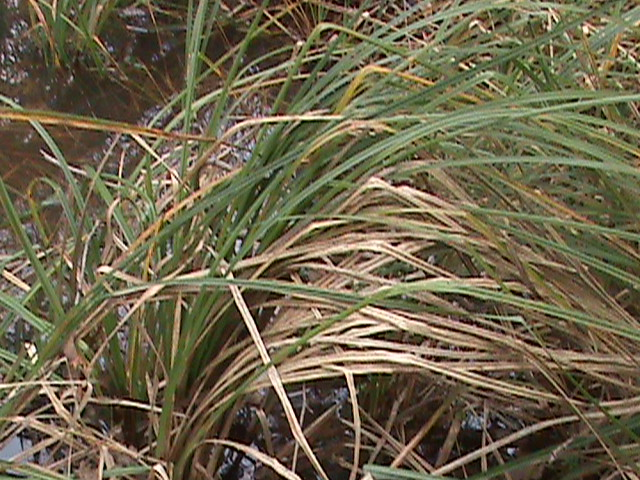

Scientific classification
- Kingdom: Plantae
- Clade: Tracheophytes
- Clade: Angiosperms
- Clade: Monocots
- Clade: Commelinids
- Order: Poales
- Family: Cyperaceae
- Genus: Carex
- Subgenus: Carex subg. Carex
- Section: Carex sect. Phacocystis
- Species: C. barbarae

Binomial name
- Carex barbarae Dewey

= Carex barbarae =

Species of grass-like plant

Carex barbarae is a species of sedge known as Santa Barbara sedge.

== Description ==
This sedge produces angled, hairless stems up to one meter tall or slightly taller, but not in clumps. The tough leaves are narrow with shredding, red-spotted or purple basal sheaths. The inflorescence produces erect and drooping spikes up to about 8 centimeters long with an associated long bract which exceeds the length of the spikes. The fruits are covered in a sac called a perigynium which is light to dark brown and sometimes red-spotted, leathery and tough, and sometimes with a toothed, hairy tip. The plant rarely matures into a fruiting stage, however, with most individuals remaining sterile.

== Distribution and habitat ==
Santa Barbara sedge is native to the western United States, in California and Oregon. It grows in wet and seasonally wet habitat, such as meadows and riverbanks.

== Uses ==
Parts of this sedge were used in basketry and as sewing fiber by California Native American groups such as the Maidu and Pomo.
